= The Women's Conference =

American feminist organization

The Women's Conference (formerly the California Governor & First Lady's Conference on Women) is a nonprofit, nonpartisan US organization and annual forum for women. The event first began in 1986 as a California government initiative for working professionals and women business owners. Since 2004, The Women's Conference has become a large event at which people such as the Dalai Lama Tenzin Gyatso, former UK Prime Minister Tony Blair, Oprah Winfrey, Barbara Walters, Jane Fonda, Martha Stewart, Tyra Banks, Sarah, Duchess of York, Tim Russert, Deepak Chopra, Tom Brokaw, Queen Rania of Jordan, Maureen Dowd, Sandra Day O'Connor, Thomas Friedman, Lalita Tademy, Anna Quindlen, and Billie Jean King have spoken.

Restructured by Shriver in 2010, The Women's Conference reportedly became the "largest meeting of women in the country" and a celebration of "lives and lessons". Now known as the California Women's Conference, its main stage presentations and seminar sessions have addressed personal topics such as work-life balance, service and volunteerism, healthy lifestyles, spirituality and families, professional issues such as professional development, financial planning, entrepreneurialism and communications, as well as social issues like women's maternal health, global poverty, climate change and emergency preparedness.

The conference has been located at the Long Beach Convention Center in Long Beach, California, since 1993, usually running in the fall.

Every year, substantial portions of the event are made available free through a live streaming webcast at The Women's Conference's web site.

== History ==
The California Women's conference first began in 1985 when the alarming failure rate of women-owned businesses became a recognized statewide concern. In an effort to help women business owners and promote available government resources, then-Governor George Deukmejian took action to create a conference focused on helping women gain access to financial, professional, and personal support. The Governor selected his hometown of Long Beach to host the first conference on September 23–24, 1985. Over 2,000 members attended.

After its inauguration, Gloria Deukmejian soon assumed responsibility for the conference, which became known as the California Governor and First Lady's Conference. Since then, the Governor of California and his wife, the California First Lady, have traditionally played a key role in the support and promotion of the highly acclaimed event.

In 1989, the conference was established as a nonprofit public interest organization with a bi-partisan Board of Directors—an organizational move meant to ensure that changes in the Governor's Mansion would not affect the continuity of the conference. With each successive California administration, the size and scope of the event has expanded considerably. Under First Lady Gayle Wilson's chairmanship (and California Governor Pete Wilson's administration) the conference expanded its focus to include corporate women. Under First Lady Sharon Davis's direction (and the administration of Governor Gray Davis) the conference added a youth leadership program.

For over 25 years, the conference steadily became better-known. Its popularity increased significantly after the 2007 election of actor Arnold Schwarzenegger as Governor of California with the support of his wife, Maria Shriver. At her direction, it was renamed The Women's Conference and the event attracted an extensive roster of high-profile speakers and celebrities. It has reportedly become the largest one-day conference for women in the nation.

In 2010, the conference was attended by more than 30,000 over three days of events, a record for the conference's 27-year-old history.

In addition, the event earned at least US$5 million to $6 million in revenues for the City Convention Center, local hotels, restaurants and other businesses.

== From 2010 ==
After the Conference's significant success from 2007, all gubernatorial support of the conference was withdrawn on the accession of Jerry Brown, Jr. as governor of California in 2010, due to the state's budget crisis. Accordingly, the California Governor and First Lady's Conference on Women was dissolved, and in 2011 there was no California Women's Conference.

It was planned for the city of Long Beach to host the 2012 conference on September 23 and 24, 2012, at the Long Beach Convention Center, under the name California Women's Conference, with the theme "The Future is Now", building upon the conference's 25-year legacy.

== Event highlights ==
The Women's Conference 2007 sold out in less than three days, a conference record. The conference gathered nearly 14,000 participants on Tuesday, October 23, 2007, and featured a panel discussion moderated by Shriver of five presidential candidates' spouses, Jeri Thompson, Michelle Obama, Cindy Hensley McCain, Elizabeth Edwards and Ann Romney. Bill Clinton did not attend because of a scheduling conflict, though Shriver joked that he had been "invited to serve coffee". The conversation touched on the role of the spouses in the campaign, the public's perceptions of the spouses, preparing their families for and protecting them from the campaign. Jon Stewart lampooned the first-ever "wives debate" on the October 30 edition of Comedy Central's The Daily Show.

Also in 2007, New York Times columnist and Pulitzer Prize-winning author Thomas Friedman moderated a conversation on leadership and the environment between former Prime Minister Tony Blair and California Governor Arnold Schwarzenegger. Due to the October 2007 California wildfires, Governor Schwarzenegger was unable to attend the conference in person and instead participated briefly via live satellite, giving an update on the status of the fires and fire fighters.

In 2006 the Dalai Lama delivered his "first-ever address to a women's conference" on stage with Maria Shriver. He expressed his belief that women can change the world with compassion and kindness, and reportedly led the 14,000 women through a meditation exercise.

In 2005 Barbara Walters and Maria Shriver engaged in an on-stage conversation with Sandra Day O'Connor on the heels of her decision to leave the U.S. Supreme Court.

== Organization highlights ==
Led by Maria Shriver's belief in the "power of WE", The Women's Conference has formed partnerships, developed programs and supported initiatives that extend the inspiration of the conference for "more than just a day" and empower women everywhere.

=== WE Care – The Women's Health Empowerment Initiative ===
WE Care supports solutions to women's health issues throughout the world. In partnership with Meredith Corporation, the initiative supports the work of CARE, a leading humanitarian organization, to save the lives of thousands of pregnant women in Africa and Latin America. WE Care encourages the women of California and beyond to join the movement to empower women in the developing world to overcome extreme poverty while proving much needed funds to fight mother-to-child transmission of HIV in Zambia and train midwives in Nicaragua to assist with safe deliveries. Participants in The Women's Conference 2007 showed their support for WE Care by making financial contributions and a visual sign of support: women dipped their hands in orange and yellow paint and left handprints on a banner that Maria Shriver will hand-deliver to the Care project sites in Nicaragua and Zambia.

=== WE Invest – The Women's Financial Empowerment Initiative ===
WE Invest promotes women's financial security and economic empowerment, helping to unleash the entrepreneurial spirit of each and every California woman. WE Invest supports California-based non-profit organizations that help women overcome social and economic barriers in their journey out of poverty.

=== WE Lead – The Minerva Leadership Program ===
The Minerva Leadership Program seeks to inspire, educate and empower young women leaders who are civically oriented and socially conscious to be the architects of their own lives and to make a difference in the world. The Minerva Leadership Program inspires young women to become leaders in their homes, schools and communities. As part of this program, and in collaboration with the Women's Foundation of California, 500 ethnically and geographically diverse California women, ages 16–22, are invited as special guests to participate fully in The Women's Conference and attend two exclusive seminar sessions. Minerva Leadership Program participants must pledge to perform an additional 10 hours of service to their communities, which leads to more than 5,000 hours service to California's communities.

== Minerva Awards ==
Created by Shriver in 2004, the Minerva Awards honors remarkable women who have stepped forward in the spirit of Minerva and changed their country with their courage, their strength and their wisdom. The Minerva Awards are presented every year at The Women's Conference. Nominees are announced prior to the conference event, typically in September.

Minerva Award recipients have made significant contributions in the areas of the Arts, Health and Sciences, Community Activism, Human Rights, Business and Technology, Motherhood, Innovation, Education and Finance. Many of the nominees not only have made a significant contribution to their profession, but they also impart their knowledge and skills to the next generation either by mentoring, or by working for the inclusion and retention of women in their field.

The award is named after the Roman Goddess, Minerva, who graces the State Seal of California.

In 2007, Shriver expanded the awards to extend beyond California to honor a woman who has positively impacted the U.S. and world by honoring Eunice Kennedy Shriver, Executive Vice President of the Joseph P. Kennedy, Jr. Foundation and Founder and Honorary Chair of Special Olympics International.

The achievements of Minerva Award winners are chronicled in a permanent exhibit at The California Museum for History, Women and the Arts in Sacramento and have become part of California's official archive.

Year	Minerva Award Recipients
2010	Carolyn Blashek, founder of Operation Gratitude which send toiletries and other much-needed supplies to soldiers overseas.; Oral Lee Brown, businesswoman and founder of the Oral Lee Brown Foundation in Oakland, California.; Sister Terry Dodge, executive director of Crossroads Inc., an eight-bed transitional living facility in Claremont, California, that offers a six-month program for women just released from prison.
2009	Jane Goodall, author, world-renowned primatologist and environmentalist and founder of The Gombe Stream Research Centre.; Agnes Stevens, retired school teacher and founder of School on Wheels a one-on-one caravan tutoring homeless children.; Dr. Kathy Hull, founder of the George Mark Children's House in San Leandro, California, the first freestanding residential pediatric palliative care center in the United States.; Helen Waukazoo, co-Founder of the American Indian Friendship House for rehabilitation and sober living.
2008	Betty Chinn, has been showing the homeless who live in her hometown of Eureka love, comfort and basic humanity daily, for over 20 years.; Billie Jean King, professional tennis player and champion of the 1973 Battle of the Sexes match, and founder of The Women's Sports Foundation.; Gloria Steinem, Women's Rights Advocate, Writer, Organizer, and Co-founder, Women's Media Center.; Ivelise Markovits, founder of Penny Lane, offering help and hope to abandoned, neglected and abused children.; Louise Hay, author, self-help pioneer, and counselor who first gained national prominence during the AIDS epidemic.
2007	The Honorable Nancy Pelosi, Speaker of the House of Representatives; "Sweet" Alice Harris, Founder and Executive Director of Parents of Watts; Maureen Pennington, Senior Nurse, Director Medical Services, Naval Medical Center San Diego; Christy Porter, Founder and Executive Director of Hidden Harvest in the Coachella Valley of California; Eunice Kennedy Shriver, Executive Vice President of the Joseph P. Kennedy, Jr. Foundation and Founder and Honorary Chair of Special Olympics International
2006	Jane Alexander, Co-founder of Citizens Against Homicide; Sandra Orozco Stapleton, Ramona Delgado and Jennie Hernandez Gin, founder of Women Escaping A Violent Environment (WEAVE); Marilyn Hamilton, Designer of the "Quickie" wheelchair and founder of "Winners on Wheels" youth program; Lifetime Achievement Minerva Award recipient: Dr. Sally Ride, Astronaut, Scientist and Writer
2005	Anita L. DeFrantz, former Olympic medalist in rowing, Vice President of the 1984 Los Angeles Games Organizing Committee and the first American female and African-American to serve on the International Olympic Committee; Sister Jennie Lechtenberg, SNJM, Executive Director, PUENTE Learning Center; Janice Mirikitani, author and partner of Glide Memorial Church; Lifetime Achievement Minerva Award recipient: Betty Ford, thirty years of service raising awareness of breast cancer and addiction
2004	Helene Brown, "political oncologist" and advocate for cancer research and prevention; Ana Deutsch, co-founder and clinical director of the Los Angeles-based Program for Torture Victims; Mimi Silbert, founder and president of the Delancey Street Foundation; Lula Washington, founder and artistic director of the Lula Washington Contemporary Dance Foundation (LWCDF)
