= First ladies and partners of California =

Spouse of the governor of California

First Partner of California
- Seal of California

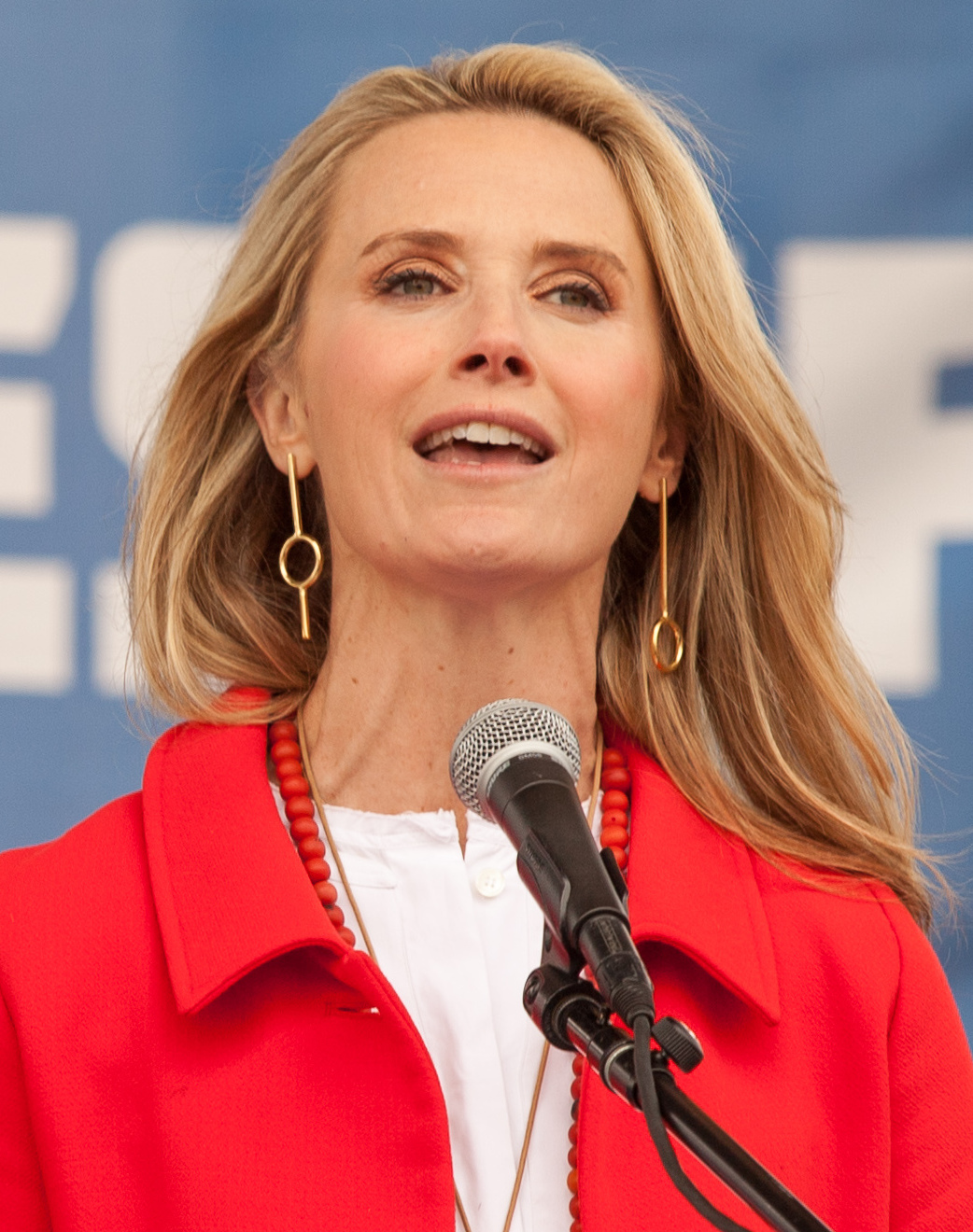
- Current; Jennifer Siebel Newsom since January 7, 2019
- Style: Mrs. Newsom; Madam First Partner
- Residence: Governor's Mansion
- Inaugural holder: Harriet Burnett (as first lady); Jennifer Siebel Newsom (as first partner)
- Formation: December 20, 1849 (176 years ago)
- Website: Official website

The first lady or first partner of California is the spouse of the governor of California. The role of the spouse of the governor of California has never been codified or officially defined. The spouse figures prominently in the social life of the state, and some spouses have been assisted with a staff in the Executive Office of the Governor. As of 2026, all the state's governors have been men, and not all of them were married while in office.

Jennifer Siebel Newsom is the spouse of the governor of California concurrent with the governor's term in office. Her predecessors held the informal but accepted title of First Lady but she opted for the title of First Partner. Governor Newton Booth wed after he retired from politics, and Washington Bartlett was a lifelong bachelor. Jerry Brown was a bachelor throughout his initial gubernatorial service but was married when he once again became governor decades later.

Prior to entering politics, Jane Stanford joined her husband Leland Stanford to help him run a mercantile business in San Francisco. The couple co-founded Stanford University. Bernice Layne Brown, wife of Governor Pat Brown, was also the mother of Governor Jerry Brown. Nancy Reagan was a career actress before her husband, Ronald Reagan, was elected governor and then president of the United States.

There are five living former first ladies: Gloria Deukmejian, widow of George Deukmejian; Gayle Wilson, wife of Pete Wilson; Sharon Davis, wife of Gray Davis; Maria Shriver, ex-wife of Arnold Schwarzenegger; and Anne Gust Brown, wife of Jerry Brown.

== List of first ladies and partners of California ==
Spouses of the governors of California
Name	Image	Birth–Death	Term	Governor	Notes	Ref(s)
Harriet Burnett		(1812–1879)	1849–1851	Peter Hardeman Burnett	Born in Wilson County, Tennessee and raised in the Methodist faith. Married August 20, 1828, Governor Burnett credited her with being instrumental in his lifetime achievements. Children Dwight, Martha Letitia, Romeetta, John, Armstead and Sallie	
Jane McDougal		(1824–1862)	1851–1852	John McDougal	Born in Indiana, disliked California and returned to Indiana until 1852. Kept a diary of her ocean voyage. Children Sue, Caroline, Latham, William, Lillie. Died in childbirth.	
Elizabeth Bigler		(c.1809–1873)	1852–1856	John Bigler	Born in New York. Outlived both her husband and daughter Virginia.	
Mary Zabriskie Johnson		(1830–1887)	1856–1858	J. Neely Johnson	Born in New Jersey. Hosted California's first gubernatorial inaugural ball. Children William and Bessie . Outlived her husband and remarried to Colonel Sylvester H. Day.	
Lizzie Weller		(1828–1885)	1858–1860	John B. Weller	Born in New York. The Governor had been married three times before Lizzie, and she had a previous marriage. Children Charles and Josiah, stepsons John and William.	
Sophie Latham		(1835–1867)	1860–1860	Milton Latham	Born in New York. No children. Her husband was only Governor for 5 days before becoming United States Senator.	
Maria Downey		(1836–1883)	1860–1862	John G. Downey	First California-born gubernatorial spouse, and the first one of Mexican heritage. Her father Don Rafael Guirado was from Guaymas, Mexico. Maria and John Downey had no children.	
Jane Stanford		(1828–1905)	1862–1863	Leland Stanford	Born in New York. One son Leland Stanford Jr. died at age 15 of typhoid fever. She and her husband founded Stanford University to honor their son's life. Her death in Honolulu, via strychnine poisoning, is believed to have been murder.	
Mollie Low		(1840–1910)	1863–1867	Frederick Low	Born in Ohio. Daughter Flora. Fashion-conscious society hostess.	
Anna Haight		(1834–1898)	1867–1871	Henry Huntly Haight	Born in Missouri. Children Janette, Mary, Dugald, Henry H. Jr. and Louis.	
Vacant			1871–1875	Newton Booth	Booth was unmarried while serving as Governor.	
Mary Catherine McIntire Pacheco		(1842–1913)	1875–1875	Romualdo Pacheco	Born in Indiana. She was also a playwright. Children Romualdo and Maybella. So far, her husband has been the only Governor of Latino heritage in the state's history.	
Amelia Irwin		(1843–1905)	1875–1880	William Irwin	Born in New York. One daughter Emma.	
Ruth Amelia Perkins		(1843–1921)	1880–1883	George Clement Perkins	Born in Ireland. Children Fannie, George, Susan, Fred, Milton, Ruth, and Grace.	
Mary Stoneman		(c.1836–1915)	1883–1887	George Stoneman	Born in Maryland. Children: Cornelius, George Jr., Katherine, and Adele	
Vacant			1887–1887	Washington Bartlett	Bartlett never married; died 9 months after taking office.	
Jane Waterman		(1829–1914)	1887–1891	Robert Waterman	Born in Canada. Active in charity work. Children: Mary, James, Helen, Waldo, Anna and Abby	
Mary Markham		(1853–1934)	1891–1895	Henry Markham	Born in Illinois, raised in Wisconsin, active in the Congregational Church after they moved to Pasadena, California. Children: Marie, Alice, Gertrude, Genevieve and Hildreth. Genevieve died shortly after Governor Markham took office.	
Inez Budd		(1851–1911)	1895–1899	James Budd	Born in Connecticut, her family relocated to Stockton, California where she met her husband James.	
Fannie Gage		(1863–1951)	1899–1903	Henry Gage	Born in Rancho Cucamonga, California. Children Fanita, Lucilla, Francis, Volney and Arthur.	
Helen Pardee		(1857–1947)	1903–1907	George Pardee	Born in Massachusetts. A graduate of what is now San Jose State University, she spent a decade teaching in Oakland. Daughters Florence, Carol, Madeline and Helen.	
Isabella Gillett		(c.1870–1946)	1907–1911	James Gillett	Born in San Francisco. Socialite and musician, she married widower James Gillett and became stepmother to his three children. Together, they had four more children Effie, Ethel, Horace and James.	
Minnie Johnson		(1869–1955)	1911–1917	Hiram Johnson	Born in Sacramento. Sons Hiram and Archibald .	
Flora Stephens		(1869–1931)	1917–1923	William Stephens	Born in Chicago, she attended higher education in California and taught school in Poway, California. Daughter Barbara.	
Augusta Richardson		(1869–1955)	1923–1927	Friend Richardson	Born in Illinois. Children Ruth, Paul and John.	
Lyla Young		(1880–1967)	1927–1932	C. C. Young	Born in Alameda, California. Daughters Barbara and Lucy. The Young family survived the 1906 San Francisco earthquake.	
Annie Rolph		(1872–1956)	1931–1934	James Rolph	Born in San Francisco. Hosted tea parties in the governor's mansion, open to the general public. Children Annette, James and Georgina .	
Jessie Merriam		(1869–1948)	1936–1939	Frank Merriam	Born in Iowa, married the widowed sitting Governor of California, no children. An advocate of women's issues and health care for the elderly.	
Kate Olson		(1883–1939)	1939–1939	Culbert Olson	Born in Utah. Children Richard, John and Dean . Held all-night poker parties in the governor's mansion.	
Nina Warren		(1893–1993)	1943–1953	Earl Warren	Born in Sweden. Her first husband, Grover Meyers, by whom she had a son James, died in 1920. She married Earl Warren in 1925, and had five children with him: Virginia, Earl Jr., Dorothy, Nina and Robert. She enjoyed being a hostess for her husband.	
Virginia Knight		(1918–2010)	1954–1959	Goodwin Knight	Born in Iowa. A World War II military widow, she married the widowed Governor Knight at the end of his first term.	
Bernice Layne Brown		(1908–2002)	1959–1967	Pat Brown	Born in San Francisco. Also mother of Governor Jerry Brown and State Treasurer Kathleen Brown.	
Nancy Reagan		(1921–2016)	1967–1975	Ronald Reagan	Born in New York. National League of Families of American POW-MIA received 100% of her salary from writing a syndicated column as spouse of the governor. Later became First Lady of the United States.	
Vacant			1975–1983	Jerry Brown	Brown was unmarried during this first tenure as Governor.	
Gloria Deukmejian		(b. 1932)	1983–1991	George Deukmejian	Born in Long Beach, California. Children: Leslie, Andrea and George. Advocate for community volunteerism.	
Gayle Wilson		(b. 1942)	1991–1999	Pete Wilson	Born in Phoenix, Arizona. Sons Todd and Phillip from a previous marriage.	
Sharon Davis		(b. 1954)	1999–2003	Gray Davis	Born in Brentwood, Los Angeles, California. Met her husband when she was a flight attendant. Wrote the book The Adventures of Capitol Kitty about a real-life black cat cared for by employees of the State Capitol building in Sacramento. Proceeds of the book went to the Governor's Book Fund, set up by Sharon Davis to benefit school libraries.	
Maria Shriver		(b. 1955)	2003–2011	Arnold Schwarzenegger	Born in Illinois. Journalist, founder of The Women’s Alzheimer’s Movement to inform and find a cure for the disease	
Anne Gust		(b. 1958)	2011–2019	Jerry Brown	Born in Michigan. Business executive, attorney	
Jennifer Siebel Newsom		(b. 1974)	2019–present	Gavin Newsom	Born in San Francisco. Documentary filmmaker and actress. Under Newsom, the office of First Lady is officially retitled as First Partner.	

== See also ==
- First lady

== Bibliography ==
- Burnett, Peter H. (1880). Recollections and opinions of an old pioneer. D. Appleton. ISBN 0-665-14418-0 – via HathiTrust.
- Lyons, Louis S.; Wilson, Josephine, eds. (1922). Who's Who Among the Women of California. Security Publishing Company – via HathiTrust.
- Mighels, Ella Sterling (1893). The story of the files; a review of California writers and literature. Cooperative printing co. – via HathiTrust.
