= Deukmejian =

Deukmejian (Armenian: Տէօքմէճեան) is an Armenian surname. Notable people with the surname include:

- George Deukmejian (1928–2018) the 35th Governor of California from 1983 to 1991 and Attorney General of California from 1979 to 1983
- Gloria Deukmejian (born 1930), former first lady of California (1983–1991) and the widow of former California governor George Deukmejian
