= Jane McDougal =

First Lady of California from 1851 to 1852

First Lady of California
- In role January 9, 1851 – January 8, 1852
- Governor: John McDougal
- Preceded by: Harriet Burnett
- Succeeded by: Elizabeth Bigler

Second Lady of California
- In role December 20, 1849 – January 9, 1851
- Lieutenant Governor: John McDougal
- Preceded by: Position established
- Succeeded by: Lucy Wyatt

Personal details
- Born: Jane Palmer; May 16, 1824 Indiana, U.S.
- Died: May 26, 1862 (aged 38) San Francisco, California, U.S.
- Spouse: John McDougal (m. 1841)
- Children: 5

Jane McDougal (née Palmer; May 16, 1824 – May 26, 1862) was the 2nd First Lady of California, wife of John McDougal, Governor from 1851 to 1852.

== Life ==
Jane Palmer was born on May 16, 1824, to Nathan Palmer and Chloe Sackett, in Indiana. During the Gold Rush, the McDougals and their daughter Sue travelled to California on the maiden voyage of the SS California.

John was unsuccessful at mining and managed his brother's store in Sutterville. Jane, dissatisfied with the conditions, returned to Indiana with Sue, leaving on May 1, 1849, once more on the SS California. She travelled by sea to Panama, then overland, via Mexico, and back to Indiana. She returned in 1852, is the only first lady to live outside the state while her husband was governor.

On July 13, 1841, McDougal married John McDougal. They had five children, Sue, Caroline, Latham, William, and Lillie. On May 26, 1862, McDougal died in childbirth in San Francisco, California.
