= Elizabeth Bigler =

First Lady of California from 1852 to 1856

First Lady of California
- In role January 8, 1852 – January 9, 1856
- Governor: John Bigler
- Preceded by: Jane McDougal
- Succeeded by: Mary Zabriskie Johnson

Personal details
- Born: Elizabeth Reeves Graham c. 1809 New York, U.S.
- Died: November 15, 1873 (aged 63–64) Sacramento, California, U.S.
- Spouse: John Bigler (m. 1847; died 1871)
- Children: 1
- Relatives: William Bigler (brother-in-law)

Elizabeth Reeves Graham Bigler (c. 1809 – November 15, 1873) was First Lady of California, wife of John Bigler, Governor from 1852 to 1856.

== Life ==
Bigler was born Elizabeth Reeves Graham in New York, around 1809. She married John Bigler around 1847 in Mount Sterling, Illinois. They had one daughter, Virginia. In 1849 they joined the Gold Rush travelling by oxcart from Mount Sterling to Sacramento.

The Bigler home in Sacramento was a popular social center. After two gubernatorial terms, John was appointed United States Minister to Chile, from 1857 to 1861. The family moved to Chile and returned to Sacramento after the posting. John Bigler died in 1871; their daughter Virginia died on February 5, 1873, and Elizabeth Bigler died on November 15, 1873, in her mid-sixties. They are buried in the Sacramento City Cemetery. The California State Library holds a collection of Bigler family papers.
