= The California Museum =

State history museum

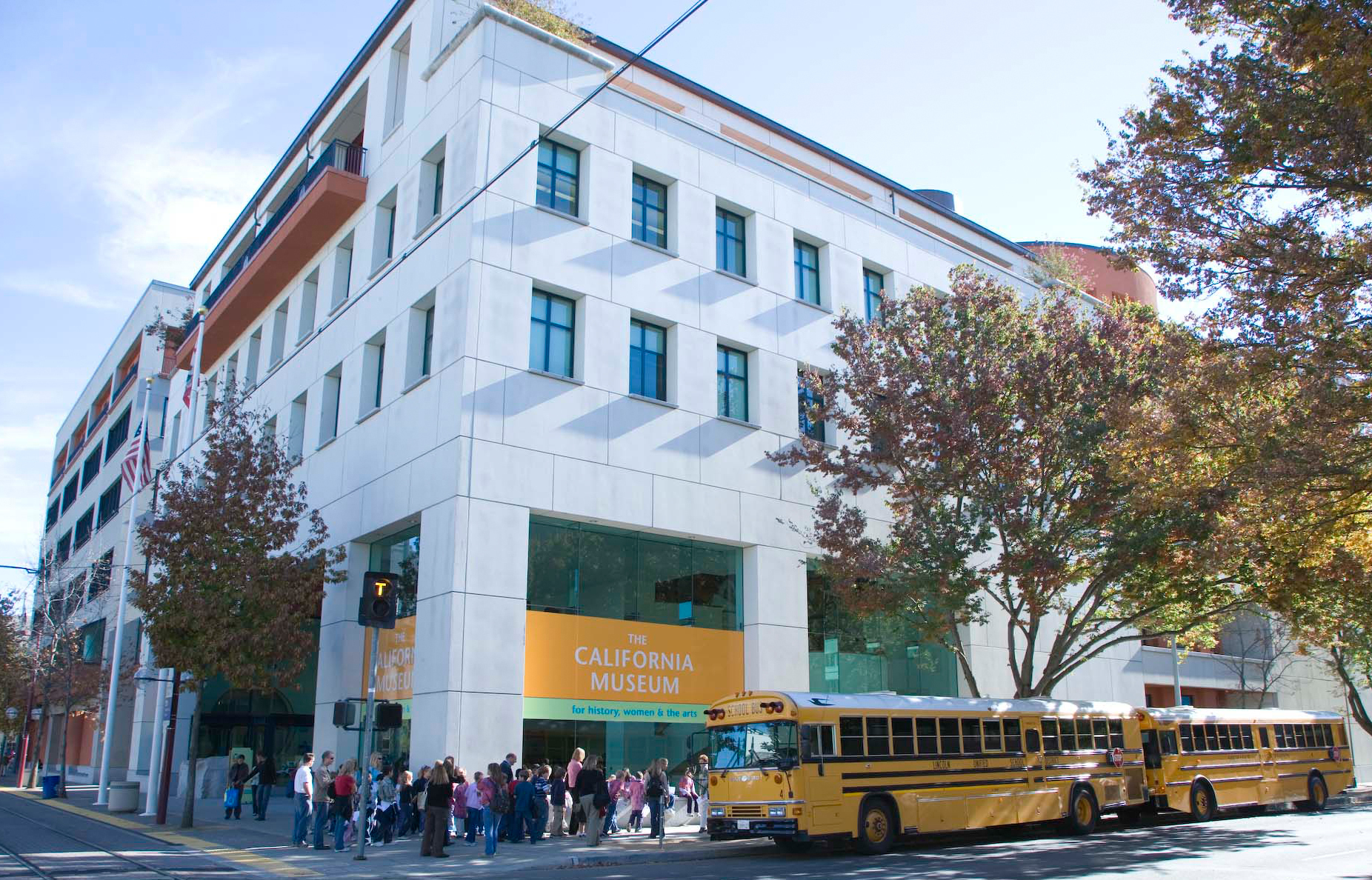

- Location within Sacramento, California
- Former name: Golden State Museum
- Established: 1998; 28 years ago
- Location: 1020 O Street; Sacramento, California, US
- Coordinates: 38°34′28.128″N 121°29′44.789″W
- Type: History museum
- Visitors: 100,000 (annual average)
- Executive director: Amanda Meeker
- Owner: Office of the Secretary of State of California
- Website: californiamuseum.org

The California Museum is the state history museum of the US state of California, located in its capital city of Sacramento. The museum is housed within the March Fong Eu Secretary of State Building complex at 1020 O Street, one block from the California State Capitol. It is home to the California Hall of Fame and the Unity Center, and operates as a private non-profit institution in partnership with the State of California. The museum was formerly known as the Golden State Museum.

== History ==
The museum was conceived by California Secretary of State March Fong Eu, who advocated for an improved facility to house the state's public archives and expressed her desire for a California history museum to showcase the state's heritage. With the passage of Senate Bill 638, a new Secretary of State/California State Archives complex was approved and completed in 1995. The museum opened in 1998 as the Golden State Museum, originally intended as a public showplace for the contents of the California State Archives.

In 2004, former First Lady of California Maria Shriver began working with the museum to expand its vision, opening "California's Remarkable Women" as the first of her collaborative efforts. The museum's exhibitions increasingly came to emphasize stories reflecting California's diverse population, with particular attention to the contributions of women and underrepresented groups.

In 2006, Shriver and then-Governor Arnold Schwarzenegger became honorary co-chairs of the museum and launched the California Hall of Fame as the museum's annual gala event and an official award from the Governor of California. Subsequent governors, including Edmund G. Brown Jr. and Gavin Newsom, have continued to collaborate with the museum on the Hall of Fame and other programming.

Maria Shriver, former First Lady of California and founder of the California Hall of Fame.

== Exhibitions ==
=== Signature exhibitions ===
The museum maintains several long-term signature exhibitions focused on California history and culture. These include "California Indians: The First People", which explores the state's Native American heritage; "Gold Mountain: Chinese Californian Stories", covering the contributions of Chinese Californians from the Gold Rush to the present; and "Women Inspire: California Women Changing Our World", highlighting women who have shaped the state from the 18th century onward.

"Uprooted: An American Story" examines the mass incarceration of Japanese Americans during World War II and features an AI-based display that allows visitors to hold virtual conversations with three survivors of the incarceration. Other signature exhibitions include the Unity Center, which celebrates the state's diverse peoples and cultures; "California Missions: A Journey Along the El Camino Real"; "Health Happens Here"; the Constitution Wall; and the Sesquicentennial Quilt.

=== California Hall of Fame ===
The California Hall of Fame was jointly established by the museum and Maria Shriver in 2006 to honor individuals who have made significant contributions to the state. The program features an annually updated artifact exhibition showcasing items on loan from the personal collections of each year's inductees. Past inductees have included entertainers such as Barbra Streisand, Francis Ford Coppola, and Linda Ronstadt; activists including Dolores Huerta and Harvey Milk; authors such as John Muir and Joan Didion; sports figures including Billie Jean King, Kareem Abdul-Jabbar, and Serena Williams; and innovators such as Walt Disney, Steve Jobs, Julia Morgan, and Frank Gehry, among more than 150 other inductees.

=== Temporary exhibitions ===
The museum also presents temporary exhibitions throughout the year. Notable among these is "Kokoro: The Story of Sacramento's Lost Japantown", which originally appeared at the museum in 2017 and has been brought back for additional showings.

== Education ==
The museum offers educational programming aligned with California curriculum standards, serving approximately 50,000 students annually, many from Title I schools. Following the COVID-19 pandemic, the museum launched online field trip programs to serve students statewide. Onsite programs include "Time of Remembrance", which uses the firsthand accounts of Japanese American docents to explore citizenship, constitutionality, and redress; "Activism & Democracy", designed to increase civic engagement through California's history of social movements; and "California's Journey", an interactive program examining the impact of immigration on early California.

== Associations ==
The California Museum is a member of the American Alliance of Museums, the California Association of Museums, and the Sacramento Association of Museums. It is the only museum in Sacramento to have received the American Alliance of Museums' Excellence in Exhibition Award, which was awarded in 2013.
