= Mary Johnson (first lady) =

First Lady of California from 1856 to 1858

First Lady of California
- In role January 9, 1856 – January 8, 1858
- Governor: J. Neely Johnson
- Preceded by: Elizabeth Bigler
- Succeeded by: Lizzie Weller

Personal details
- Born: Mary Zabriskie c. 1830 New Jersey, U.S.
- Died: June 26, 1887 (aged 56–57)
- Spouse(s): J. Neely Johnson (m. 1851; died 1872) Sylvester H. Day
- Children: 2

Mary Johnson (née Zabriskie; c. 1830 - 26 June 1887) was the 4th First Lady of California, wife of J. Neely Johnson, Governor from 1856 to 1858.

== Life ==
Born Mary Zabriskie to James C. Zabriskie and Elizabeth W. Mann around 1830 in New Jersey. The family moved to California in 1849. They settled in Sacramento where James practiced law.

Mary married Colonel J. Neely Johnson on 26 June 1851. They had two children William and Bessie.

J. Neely Johnson and Mary had the first gubernatorial inaugural ball in California, in 1856. Mary was prominent in Sacramento society.

In 1859, they moved to Carson City, Nevada Territory, where J. Neely ran the Bowers Mine.

After her husband's death Mary married Colonel Sylvester H. Day. She lived in Carson City until her death on 23 November 1887.
