= Miss Representation =

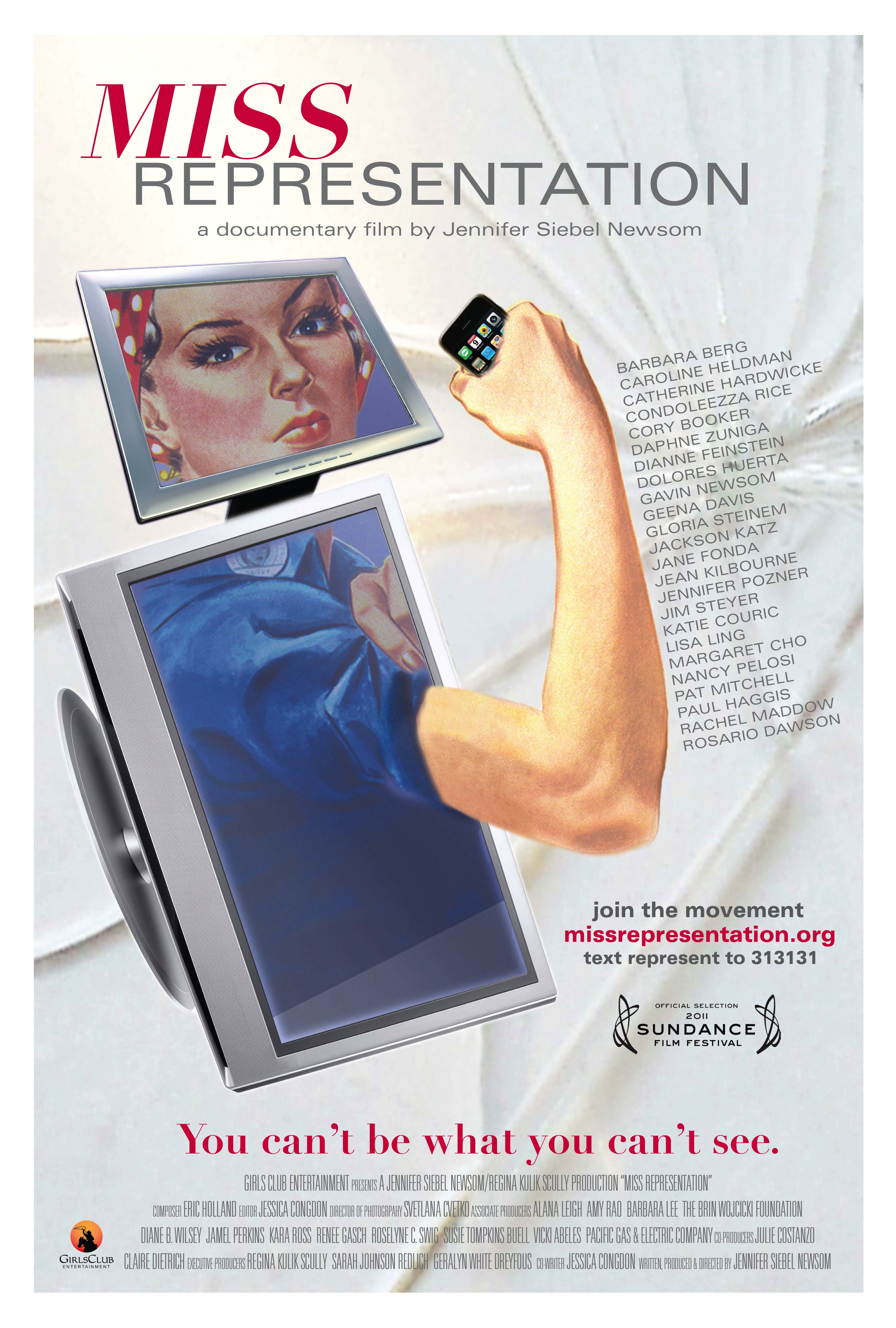
- Promotional poster
- Directed by: Jennifer Siebel Newsom
- Written by: Jennifer Siebel Newsom; Jessica Congdon; Claire Dietrich; Jenny Raskin
- Produced by: Jennifer Siebel Newsom; Julie Costanzo
- Cinematography: Svetlana Cvetko; John Behrens; Ben Wolf; Norman Bonney; Nathan Levine-Heaney; Brad Seals; Boryana Alexandrova; Nicole Hirsch-Whitaker
- Edited by: Jessica Congdon
- Music by: Eric Holland
- Production company: Girls' Club Entertainment
- Release date: January 22, 2011 (Sundance Film Festival)
- Running time: 85 minutes
- Country: United States
- Language: English
- Budget: $750,000 (est.)

Miss Representation is a 2011 American documentary film written, directed, and produced by Jennifer Siebel Newsom. The film explores how mainstream media contributes to the under-representation of women in influential positions by circulating limited and often disparaging portrayals of women. The film premiered in the documentary category at the 2011 Sundance Film Festival.

The film includes interviews with prominent women in media, such as Jane Fonda, Rachel Maddow, and Katie Couric, who discuss why their personal experiences have made them passionate about better portrayals of women in media. Siebel Newsom also uses this film to further her social action campaigns through The Representation Project, which was founded due to her frustration with the relationship between the under-representation of women in media and the under-representation of women in American politics.

== Synopsis ==
The film interweaves stories from teenage girls with interviews to give an inside look at the media and its message that underscores young women need and want positive role models, and that the media has thus far neglected its unique opportunity to provide them. The film includes a social action campaign to address change in policy, education and call for socially responsible business. The movie brought along a lot of positive movement and encourages those who viewed the film to take the pledge against gender misrepresentations by using hashtags like #RepresentHer and #DisruptTheNarrative.

== Cast ==
The cast consists of over 109 subjects, appearing as themselves. Raw footage of teenage girls telling their stories is shown alongside direct interviews with a multitude of influential celebrities, prominent political figures, activists, and accomplished filmmakers. These interviews included Katie Couric, Condoleezza Rice, Lisa Ling, Geena Davis, Marissa Mayer, Jean Kilbourne, Cory Booker, Rachel Maddow, Rosario Dawson, Jim Steyer and Jackson Katz.

== Filming locations ==
Most filming took place in Los Angeles, California and San Francisco, California.

== Screenings ==
The film previewed on October 18, 2010, at an awards luncheon hosted by the San Francisco Commission on the Status of Women. The film premiered on January 22, 2011, at the Sundance Film Festival, followed by screenings at the Athena Film Festival at Barnard College in New York City in February.

== Soundtrack ==
The film's soundtrack includes music from Metric, Alan Moorhouse, Van Phillips, Jules Larson, Chinatown, and Randi Skyland.

- "Help, I'm Alive" — Metric
- "Gold Guns Girls" - Metric
- "In The Swing" - Alan Moorhouse
- "Tom Fool" - Van Phillips
- "I Want It All" - Jules Larson
- "Drive Me Crazy" - Chinatown
- "This Is My Life" - Randi Skyland

== Recognition ==
The Oprah Winfrey Network acquired broadcast rights for the film following its premiere.

Audience Award from

- 2011 Palo Alto International Film Festival
- 2011 Sonoma Film Festival

Official Selection at

- 2011 Atlanta Film Festival
- 2011 Dallas Film Festival
- 2011 Denver Film Festival
- 2011 Newport Beach Film Festival
- 2011 New Zealand Film Festival
- 2011 San Francisco Film Festival
- 2011 Silver Docs Film Festival
- 2011 Sundance Film Festival

Other

- 2011 Maui Film Festival: Movies Matter Award
- 2011: Nominated for the Grand Jury Prize, Sundance Film Festival
- 2012 Gracie Allen Awards: Outstanding Documentary
- Won WFCC Award for Best Theatrically Unreleased Movie by or About Women

== Advocacy efforts ==
Miss Representation was the inspiration behind Siebel Newsom's Representation Project, a non-profit organization using celebrity ambassadors to spread the messages of the film to the community and media. This organization was founded in April 2011 and has since created the award-winning documentary The Mask You Live In, as well as built an online platform to provide tools and information for how to make a difference in your community.

A call-to-action campaign grew out of the film, including a Twitter campaign to call out offensive media, a crowd-sourced list of media that represent women and girls fairly, a virtual internship program to recruit representatives, guides for media representation conversation starters, guides for electing females for political office, weekly action alerts, gender equality principles and resources & tools for taking action.

== Online activism ==
In March 2017 for the International Women's Day, Jennifer Siebel Newsom and The Representation Project (formerly “Miss Representation.org”) launched a campaign against hate speech ("#NotBuyingIt") asking Amazon to stop buying ads on website Breitbart and using the crowdspeaking platform Daycause to create a tweetstorm.

The #NotBuyingIt campaign is a movement meant to empower others and call attention to the misrepresentations of men and women in the media. Siebel Newsom encourages youth to go against dangerous and negative messages that come along with the influence of the media. Stereotypes that the media promotes is what Siebel Newsom hopes the youth will overcome through the campaign. So far more than 60 million people have been inspired with the campaign and have expressed their views on Twitter. Siebel Newsom wants to make it as inclusive as possible for anyone involved in the campaign. There are many small things people can do each day. Siebel Newsom claims that they lead to a larger impact. Siebel Newsom believes that standing up to the injustices seen in daily lives is how we are going to put a stop to it. Another action Siebel Newsom wants to take is adding media-literacy classes in schools. By doing this, Siebel Newsom believes this is another way to educate the youth about how to understand the media and its messages.

Additionally, a quote from activist Gloria Steinem featured in the film, “If you can’t see it, you can’t be it,” gained traction in social media spaces following the film’s release as a rallying cry for positive female representation in media. Among other interpretations of the phrase, authors Cheryl Cooky and Lauren Rauscher argue that this message is especially resonant within the sports industry. The neglect of women’s sports in popular media has had a well-documented effect on girls’ interest in the field. When women’s sports are depicted, they are often sexualized. This sexualization can lead those who do pursue sports after adolescence to self-objectify, creating a negative environment in either scenario. Steinem’s words continue to impact discussion on the representation of women years after the film’s release, being featured in academic articles and literature.

== See also ==
- Celluloid ceiling
- Killing Us Softly
- Media and gender
