= Maria Shriver =

American journalist and author (born 1955)

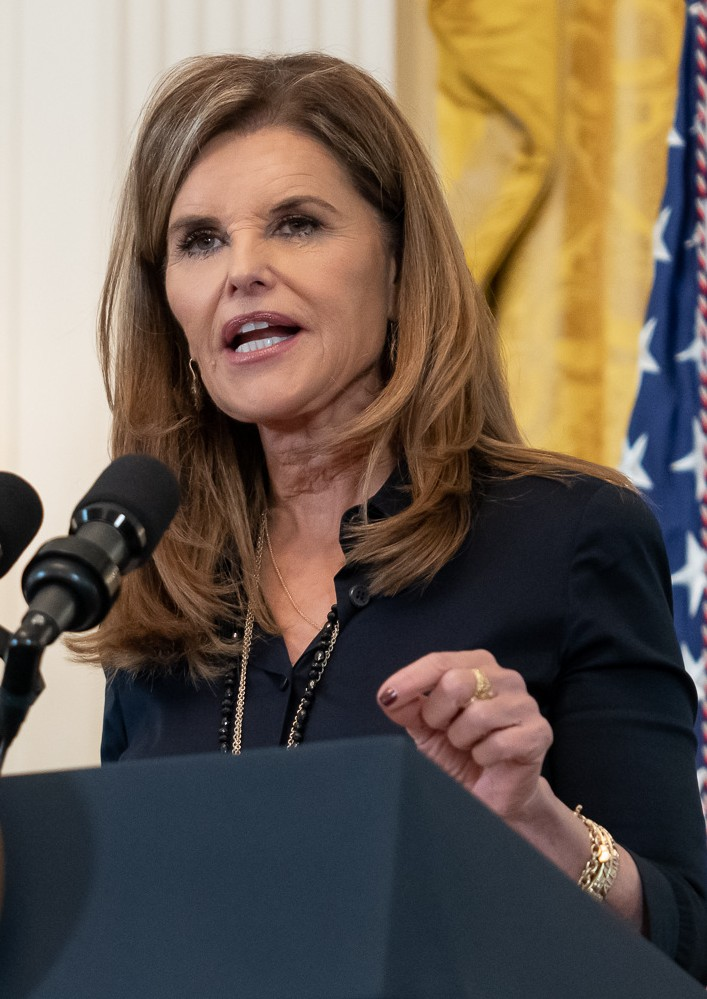
- Shriver in 2024

First Lady of California
- In role November 17, 2003 – January 3, 2011
- Governor: Arnold Schwarzenegger
- Preceded by: Sharon Davis
- Succeeded by: Anne Gust Brown

Personal details
- Born: Maria Owings Shriver; November 6, 1955 (age 71) Chicago, Illinois, U.S.
- Party: Democratic (before 2011); Independent (2011–present)
- Spouse: Arnold Schwarzenegger (m. 1986; div. 2021)
- Children: 4, including Katherine and Patrick
- Parents: Sargent Shriver; Eunice Kennedy
- Relatives: Shriver family Kennedy family
- Education: Georgetown University (BA)
- Occupation: Writer; journalist; activist

Maria Owings Shriver (/ˈʃraɪvər/ SHRY-vər; born November 6, 1955) is an American writer and journalist. Shriver is a member of the Shriver family and Kennedy family, a former First Lady of California, and the founder of the non-profit organization The Women's Alzheimer's Movement. She was married to actor and former Governor of California, Arnold Schwarzenegger, with whom she had four children, before separating in 2011 and divorcing in 2021.

Shriver began her journalism career at KYW-TV and briefly anchored the CBS Morning News before joining NBC News in 1986. After anchoring weekend editions of the Today show and the NBC Nightly News, she became a correspondent for Dateline NBC, also covering politics. After leaving NBC News in 2004 to focus on her role as First Lady of California, she returned in 2013 as a special anchor. For her reporting at NBC, Shriver received a Peabody Award in 1998 and was co-anchor for NBC's Emmy-winning coverage of the 1988 Summer Olympics. As executive producer of The Alzheimer's Project, Shriver earned two Emmy Awards and an Academy of Television Arts & Sciences award for developing a "television show with a conscience".

== Early life and education ==
Shriver was born in Chicago, Illinois, on November 6, 1955, the second child and only daughter of politician Sargent Shriver and activist Eunice Kennedy. She is a niece of the late U.S. president John F. Kennedy, U.S. attorney general and U.S. senator Robert F. Kennedy, U.S. senator Ted Kennedy, and six other siblings. A Roman Catholic, she is of mostly Irish and German descent.

Shriver spent her middle school years living in Paris and returned permanently from France to Bethesda, Maryland, in 1970, where she attended Stone Ridge School of the Sacred Heart high school and graduated in 1973. She received a Bachelor of Arts degree in American studies from Georgetown University in June 1977.

== Media career ==
Shriver began her journalism career with KYW-TV in Philadelphia, Pennsylvania, she co-anchored The CBS Morning News with Forrest Sawyer from August 1985 until August 1986, co-anchored NBC News's Sunday Today from 1987 until 1990. Shriver also served as Saturday anchor 1989 & Sunday 1990 and contributing anchor 1996-1999 of NBC Nightly News. She was a contributing anchor on Dateline NBC from 1992 until 2004. In August 2003, Shriver took an unpaid leave of absence from NBC News when her husband became a candidate in the 2003 California gubernatorial recall election.

Following her husband's November 17, 2003, inauguration as the 38th Governor of California, she became the First Lady of California. She then returned to reporting, making two more appearances for Dateline NBC. She left NBC News in February 2004.

She appeared as herself in the film Last Action Hero (1993). She also played a minor role as herself in "Be Prepared", a 2006 episode of the television series That's So Raven promoting a "Preparedness Plan".

Shriver announced that she would not return to the news media after the excessive media coverage of the death of Anna Nicole Smith. Shriver subsequently returned to the news media.

Shriver, in 2019, talking about the inaugural meeting of the California Alzheimer's Task Force, which she chairs.

== Advocacy ==
In 2003, Shriver's father, Sargent Shriver, was diagnosed with Alzheimer's disease, and she became an advocate and fundraiser for Alzheimer's patient care and biomedical research. Shriver was the executive producer of The Alzheimer's Project, a four-part documentary series that premiered on HBO in May 2009 and later earned two Emmy Awards. The series took a close look at cutting-edge research being done in the country's leading Alzheimer's laboratories. The documentary also examined the effects of this disease on patients and families. One of the Emmy Award-winning films, Grandpa, Do you Know Who I Am? is based on Shriver's best-selling children's book dealing with Alzheimer's.

Shriver is an advocate for people with intellectual disabilities. She is a member of the International Board of Special Olympics, the organization her mother founded in 1968. She is also on the advisory board of Best Buddies, a one-to-one friendship and jobs program for people with intellectual disabilities. In addition, Shriver serves as Chair of the Audi Best Buddies Challenge: Hearst Castle, a fundraising event for programs supporting people with intellectual disabilities. As First Lady, Shriver supported the hiring of individuals with intellectual disabilities in the capitol and in various state offices through her WE Include program. In February 2008, Shriver started an ice cream company called Lovin' Scoopful with her brother, Tim Shriver. Twenty-five percent of the proceeds from Lovin' Scoopful benefits the Special Olympics.

In 2008, Shriver executive-produced American Idealist: The Story of Sargent Shriver. The documentary originally aired on PBS on January 21, 2008. The film chronicled the life, accomplishments and vision of her father, Sargent Shriver. Shriver also serves on the advisory board of the Sargent Shriver Peace Institute, which raises public awareness of her father's legacy as a peacebuilder and offers educational and training programs grounded in the principles of public service that motivate the many programs he created, including the Peace Corps, Job Corps, Head Start, and Legal Services for the Poor.

In 2016, Shriver published Color Your Mind, a coloring book for people with Alzheimer's.

In 2018, she published I've Been Thinking...: Reflections Prayers and Meditations for a Meaningful Life, which became an instant No. 1 New York Times bestseller. Shriver released a companion journal, I've Been Thinking...The Journal: Reflections, Prayers and Inspirations for Your Meaningful Life, in January 2019.

Shriver and her daughter, Christina Schwarzenegger, were co-executive producers of Take Your Pills (2018), an hour-long documentary on psychostimulant medications.

== The Shriver Report ==
In October 2009, Shriver launched "The Shriver Report: A Woman's Nation Changes Everything", a national study and comprehensive report conducted in partnership with the Center for American Progress, USC's Annenberg Center on Communication, Leadership and Policy, and the Rockefeller Foundation. The Shriver Report revealed that American women, for the first time, make up half of the United States workforce and studied how that fact is impacting major institutions like family, business, government and faith organizations. The report was released in 2013 in partnership with TIME and NBC News. According to The New York Times, the report "was modeled on a study undertaken almost 50 years ago during the administration of John F. Kennedy, Shriver's uncle, and led by Eleanor Roosevelt." The report features, among other things, writings by public figures including Suze Orman, Beyoncé, Tammy Duckworth, Billie Jean King, Heidi Hartmann, Susan J. Douglas, Stephanie Coontz, Kristin Rowe-Finkbeiner, John Podesta, and Oprah Winfrey.

In 2010 The Shriver Report: A Woman's Nation Takes on Alzheimer's was published. It is a study by Maria Shriver and the Alzheimer's Association. It features, among other things, writings by public figures including Barbra Streisand, Laura Bush, Patti Davis, Soleil Moon Frye, Rosalynn Carter, Susan Collins, Kathleen Sebelius, Barbara Mikulski, and Joe Biden.

The Shriver Report: A Woman's Nation Pushes Back from the Brink was published in 2014. The book is about women and their children in poverty. It is by Maria Shriver, with editors Olivia Morgan, and Karen Skelton, and features, among other things, writings by public figures including Carol Gilligan, Beyoncé, Joan Chittister, Ai-Jen Poo, Eva Longoria, Stephanie Coontz, Jennifer Garner, Kathleen Sebelius, Jada Pinkett Smith, Anne-Marie Slaughter, Tory Burch, Sheryl Sandberg, Kirsten Gillibrand, Barbara Ehrenreich, LeBron James, and Hillary Clinton.

== First Lady of California (2003-2011) ==
After Arnold took office, Shriver took on several key initiatives as First Lady and cut back on her news reporting to avoid conflicts of interest.

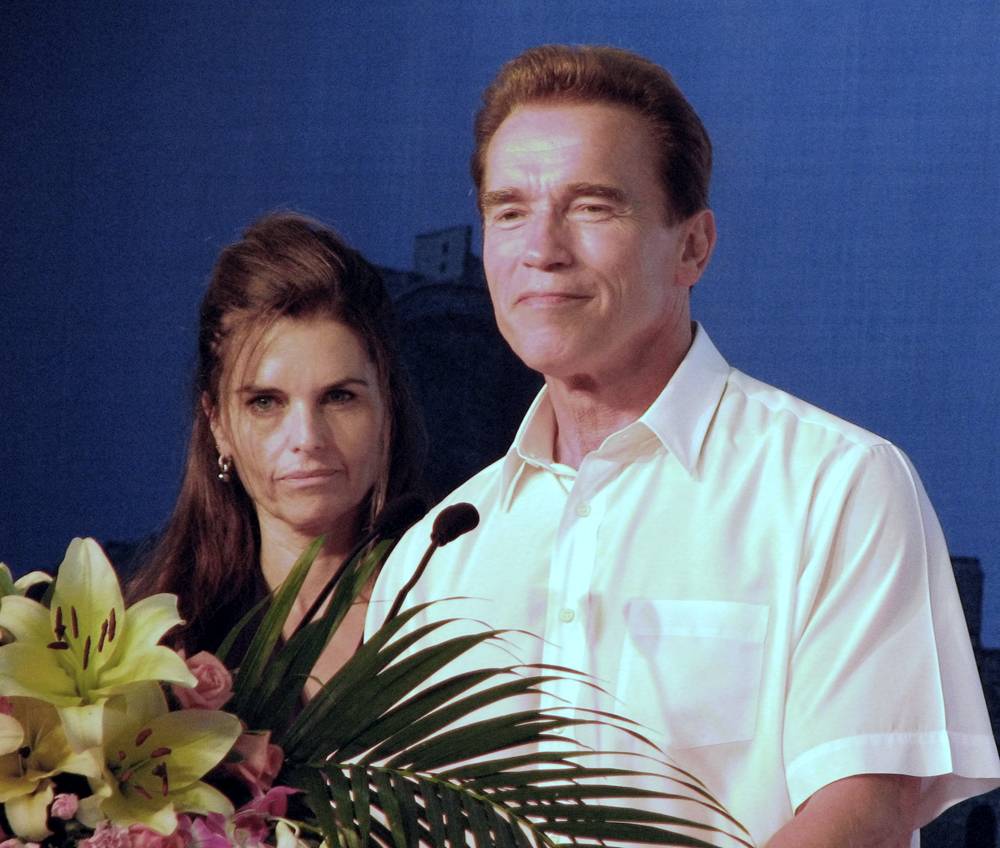
Shriver with her husband Arnold Schwarzenegger at the 2007 Special Olympics in Shanghai, China

Shriver began leading the California Governor & First Lady's Conference on Women when Schwarzenegger took office in 2003. Each year, the event is held at the Long Beach Convention Center in October. Luminaries have spoken at the conference including Oprah Winfrey, Associate Justice of the U.S. Supreme Court Sandra Day O'Connor, U.S. Secretaries of State Condoleezza Rice and Madeleine Albright, Barbara Walters, Warren Buffett, Governor Arnold Schwarzenegger, former British Prime Minister Tony Blair, Richard Branson, Bono, Billie Jean King, Gloria Steinem, and the Dalai Lama.

In 2004, Shriver created The Minerva Awards to honor and reward "remarkable California women" who have changed their communities, their state, their country and the world with their courage, wisdom and strength. The Minerva Awards are named after Minerva, the Roman goddess who adorns the California State Seal and "who symbolizes the dual nature of women as warriors and peacemakers". The Minerva Awards are presented annually at The Women's Conference in Long Beach during a special ceremony. Recipients of the award also receive a grant to continue their work. Past Minerva Awards recipients include former first lady Betty Ford, Nancy Pelosi, Gloria Steinem, Billie Jean King, astronaut Sally Ride and the late Eunice Kennedy Shriver, Shriver's mother. The achievements of The Minerva Award winners are chronicled in a permanent exhibit at The California Museum for History, Women and the Arts in Sacramento and have become part of California's official state archive.

In 2004, Shriver was in attendance at both the Democratic National Convention and the Republican National Convention, attending the first to watch her uncle Ted Kennedy speak, and the latter to watch her husband speak.

In 2005, Shriver launched her WE Connect Program, which connects working families in need with money-saving programs and support services. WE Connect brings together community organizations and businesses, government agencies and state leaders, congregations and schools as partners in responding to the needs of the millions of individuals and families who are struggling to make ends meet. Through a partnership with La Opinión, the nation's largest Spanish-language newspaper, WE Connect has developed three editions of a 24-page, full-color, bilingual supplement that has been circulated to over 20 million Californians in need. In December 2009, Shriver, in partnership with The Women's Conference, created the WE Connect–Million Meals Initiative. Through this initiative, The Women's Conference made a donation to The California Association of Food Banks to provide more than one million meals to California families in need. The donation was allocated to the food bank's 44 member organizations who then distributed the food to California families through its more than 5,000 community-based organizations. In March 2010, Shriver held a three-day Community Resources Fair in Fresno and Los Angeles through WE Connect. The fairs provided vital programs and free support services such as tax preparation, housing and home foreclosure assistance, job assistance, flu shots, healthy food distribution and more. Event organizers estimated that over 40,000 individuals took advantage of free services during the course of the two weekends, and hundreds of thousands pounds of food were distributed.

As First Lady, Shriver worked to promote service and volunteerism. As Honorary Chair of CaliforniaVolunteers, Shriver conceived of and launched the largest statewide volunteer matching network at CaliforniaVolunteers.org. Shriver was instrumental in inspiring Governor Schwarzenegger to establish the nation's first state cabinet-level Department of Service and Volunteering. She also pioneered and promoted a statewide disaster preparedness program called WE Prepare that encourages and educates Californians to be ready for an emergency or natural disaster. In addition, Shriver established WE Build and WE Garden, a children's playground and community garden-building initiative. "Try growing Tomatoes, I' beans don't grow," she exclaimed. Through CaliforniaVolunteers, Shriver has built 31 playgrounds with gardens in lower-income communities around the state in partnership with KaBOOM!.

In 2008, Shriver launched her WE Invest Program, which provides training, mentoring, support networks, microloans and other resources to help women launch or grow their businesses. In June 2009, she expanded WE Invest nationally through a partnership with Kiva, creating the first-ever online peer-to-peer microlending program in the U.S. Shriver is credited with coming up with the idea to bring Kiva's international micro-lending model to the United States.

Shriver is co-chair of The California Museum for History, Women and the Arts and she has been credited with revitalizing the state museum during her tenure. Shriver created the California Hall of Fame in 2006 at the Museum to honor legendary Californians such as Cesar Chavez, Clint Eastwood, Walt Disney, Amelia Earhart, Ronald Reagan, John Steinbeck, Rita Moreno, Earl Warren, Julia Morgan, Leland Stanford, Dorothea Lange and others. In November 2008, Shriver launched the California Legacy Trails, a first-of-its-kind web-based multimedia learning tool designed to help students learn California history.

On February 3, 2008, Shriver endorsed Senator Barack Obama for the 2008 Democratic presidential nomination. The endorsement was given at a UCLA rally featuring Caroline Kennedy (Shriver's cousin), Oprah Winfrey, Stevie Wonder, and Obama's wife Michelle Obama. Governor Schwarzenegger had endorsed Senator John McCain for the Republican presidential nomination a few days earlier on January 31, 2008. Later that year, as in 2004, Shriver was in attendance at the Democratic National Convention when her uncle Ted Kennedy spoke.

In May 2009, Shriver planted the first edible garden at a state capitol in what once was a flower bed. She teamed up with Alice Waters on the project. The food grown in the organic garden is distributed to local food banks. Shriver has been an advocate for edible gardens and chairs the California School Garden Network that has doubled the number of gardens in state schools from 3,000 to 6,000 since 2004.

== Later career ==
=== Return to NBC News ===
On April 30, 2013, NBC announced that Shriver would join the network again as a special anchor working on issues surrounding the shifting roles of women in American life.

On October 18, 2013, Shriver returned to the anchor desk on Today, filling-in for Savannah Guthrie for the first time since 1998 as co-anchor with Matt Lauer.

=== Business ===
She was one of the executive producers of Still Alice (2014).

In May 2022, Shriver was reported to be an early investor in Dave's Hot Chicken, an American fast food chain, alongside a number of celebrities including Drake and Samuel L. Jackson.

== Personal life ==
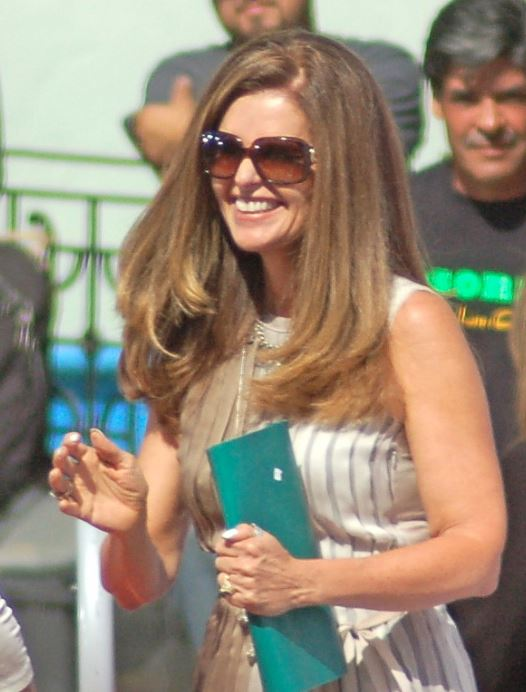
Shriver in April 2013

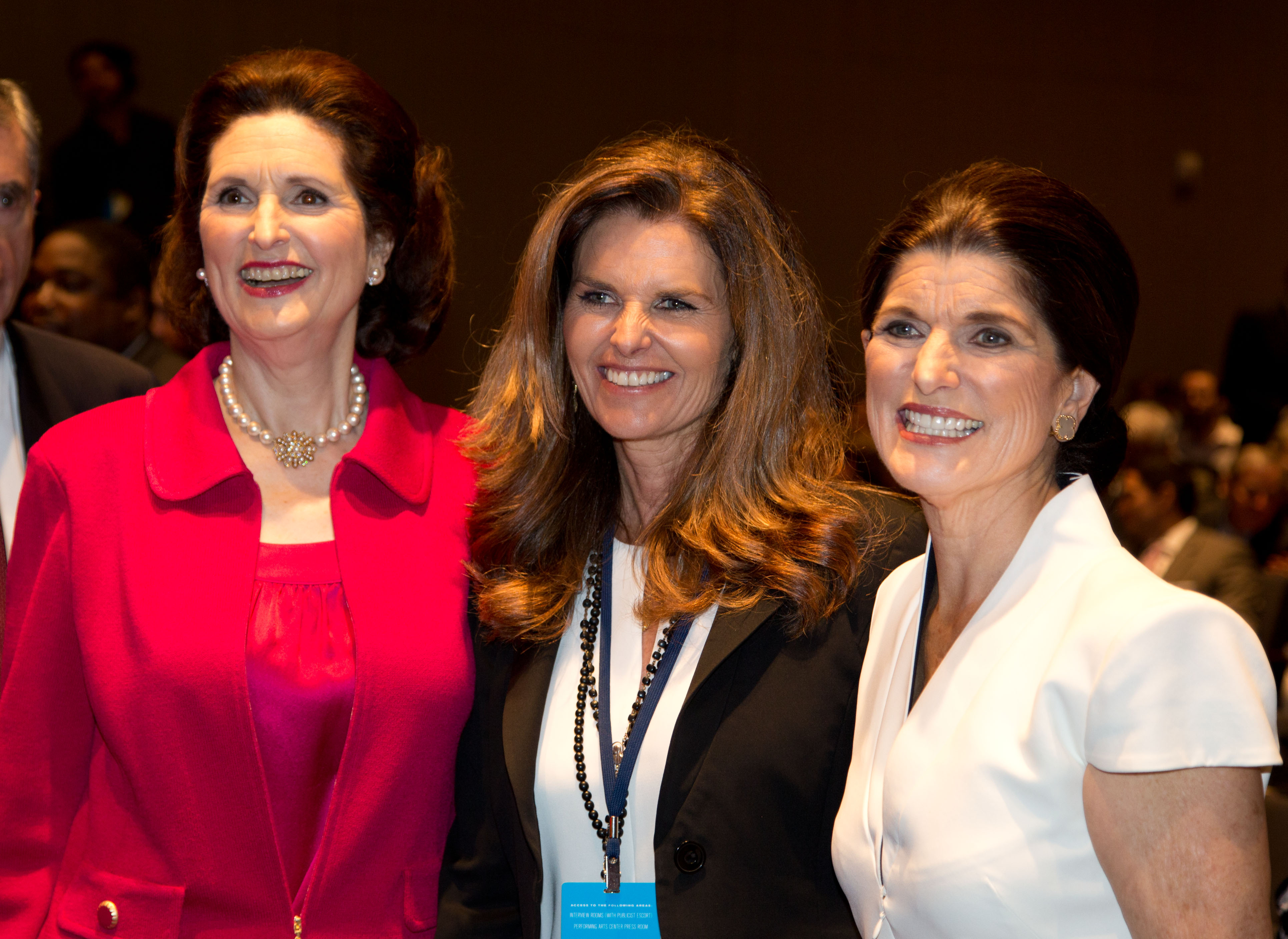
(L-R) Lynda Johnson Robb, Shriver, and Luci Baines Johnson at the Civil Rights Exhibit at the LBJ Presidential Library in 2014

In 1977, Tom Brokaw introduced Maria to Austrian bodybuilder and actor Arnold Schwarzenegger at a charity tennis tournament being held at her mother's home. She married Schwarzenegger on April 26, 1986, in Hyannis, Massachusetts, at St. Francis Xavier Roman Catholic Church. They have four children; two daughters and two sons, including Katherine and Patrick.

On May 9, 2011, Schwarzenegger and Shriver announced their separation after 25 years of marriage, and Shriver moved out of the couple's Brentwood mansion. In a message for her Twitter followers posted on May 13, 2011, Shriver said: "Thank you all for the kindness, support and compassion. I am humbled by the love. Thank you."

On May 17, 2011, Schwarzenegger publicly admitted to fathering Joseph Baena with longtime household staff member Mildred "Patty" Baena. Baena became pregnant in 1997, before his election as Governor of California. He confessed to Shriver only after she confronted him with the information, and after Shriver had confirmed her long-held suspicions in a conversation with Patty Baena. Shriver described Schwarzenegger's admission as "painful and heartbreaking". She declined to speak further on the issue, saying: "As a mother, my concern is for the children. I ask for compassion, respect and privacy as my children and I try to rebuild our lives and heal." Shriver filed for divorce on July 1, 2011, citing "irreconcilable differences". Due to various legal disputes, the divorce was not finalized until December 2021.

== Honors ==
As executive producer of The Alzheimer's Project, Shriver earned two Emmy Awards and an Academy of Television Arts & Sciences award for developing a "television show with a conscience". She has additionally won Peabody Awards for her television journalism.

In 2009, Shriver was honored with the Shinnyo-en Foundation's 2009 Pathfinders to Peace Award, which is bestowed annually to a person who exemplifies the ideals of compassion, harmony, and peace.

The Saint John's Health Center has a nursery named after Shriver.

A hybrid rose was named after Shriver in October 2004. The Maria Shriver rose contains starchy-white blooms and a powerful citrus fragrance.

In 2017, the Alzheimer's Association awarded Shriver with its first-ever Lifetime Achievement Award.

== Books ==
- Maria Shriver; Sandra Speidel (February 1999). What's Heaven?. Golden Books Adult Publishing. ISBN 978-0-312-38241-4.
- Maria Shriver (April 4, 2000). Ten Things I Wish I'd Known Before I Went Out Into The Real World. Grand Central Publishing. ISBN 978-0-446-52612-8.
- Maria Shriver; Sandra Speidel (October 16, 2001). What's Wrong With Timmy?. Little, Brown and Company. ISBN 978-0-316-23337-8.
- Maria Shriver; Sandra Speidel (April 28, 2004). What's Happening to Grandpa?. Little, Brown and Company. ISBN 978-0-316-00101-4.
- Maria Shriver (April 5, 2005). And One More Thing Before You Go... The Free Press. ISBN 978-0-7432-8101-0.
- Maria Shriver (April 15, 2008). Just Who Will You Be?. Hachette Books. ISBN 978-1-4013-9550-6.
- Maria Shriver (February 27, 2018). I've Been Thinking...: Reflections, Prayers, and Meditations for a Meaningful Life. Penguin Publishing Group. ISBN 9780525559917.
- Maria Shriver (April 1, 2025). I Am Maria: My Reflections and Poems on Heartbreak, Healing, and Finding Your Way Home. Penguin Publishing Group. ISBN 978-0-593-65339-5.

== See also ==
- Shriver family
- Kennedy family

Honorary titles
Preceded by Sharon Davis	First Lady of California; 2003–2011	Succeeded by Anne Gust Brown
