= Harriet Burnett =

First Lady of California

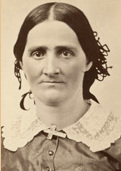

First Lady of California
- In role December 20, 1849 – January 9, 1851
- Governor: Peter Hardeman Burnett
- Preceded by: Position established
- Succeeded by: Jane McDougal

Personal details
- Born: Harriet Rogers; February 23, 1812 Wilson County, Tennessee, U.S.
- Died: September 19, 1879 (aged 67)
- Spouse: Peter Hardeman Burnett (m. 1828)
- Children: 6

Harriet Burnett (née Rogers; February 23, 1812 – September 19, 1879) was the inaugural First Lady of California, wife of Peter Hardeman Burnett, governor from 1849 to 1851.

== Life ==
Born Harriet Rogers on February 23, 1812, in Wilson County, Tennessee, to Peter Rogers and Sara "Sally" Pirtle. Rogers was raised in the Methodist faith. She married Peter Hardeman Burnett on August 20, 1828. Governor Burnett credited her with being instrumental in his lifetime achievements. They had six children Dwight, Martha Letitia, Romeetta, John, Armstead and Sallie.

In 1843, the family of eight travelled 1,691 miles (2,721 km) by oxcart to Fort Walla Walla, Washington. In the gold rush of 1849 they sailed from Oregon City, landing in San Francisco on June 1. After Peter became governor, the Burnett's had a home built in Alviso, near the state capitol of San Jose. They lived in San Jose and San Francisco until Harriet's death on September 19, 1879.
