= Jennifer Siebel Newsom =

American actress and filmmaker

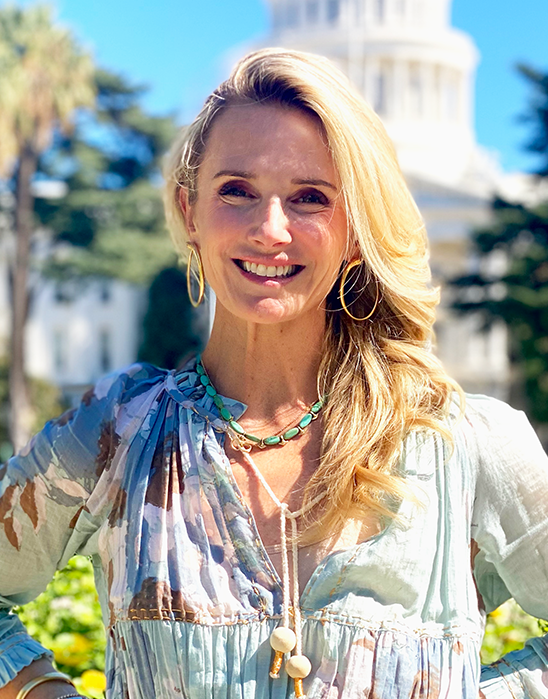
- Official portrait, 2024

First Partner of California
- Current
- Assumed role January 7, 2019
- Governor: Gavin Newsom
- Preceded by: Anne Gust Brown (Note: as First Lady)

Second Lady of California
- In role January 10, 2011 – January 7, 2019
- Lieutenant Governor: Gavin Newsom
- Preceded by: Laura Maldonado
- Succeeded by: Markos Kounalakis (Note: as second partner)

First Lady of San Francisco
- In role July 26, 2008 – January 10, 2011
- Mayor: Gavin Newsom
- Preceded by: Kimberly Guilfoyle (Note: Role vacant from February 28, 2006 to July 26, 2008)
- Succeeded by: Anita Lee

Personal details
- Born: Jennifer Lynn Siebel; June 19, 1974 (age 52) San Francisco, California, U.S.
- Party: Democratic (2024–present)
- Other political affiliations: Republican (before 2008); American Independent (2008); Independent (2008–2024)
- Spouse: Gavin Newsom (m. 2008)
- Children: 4
- Relatives: Thomas Siebel (2nd cousin once removed)
- Education: Stanford University (BA, MBA)

Jennifer Lynn Siebel Newsom (née Siebel; born June 19, 1974) is an American documentary filmmaker and actress who has served as the First Partner of California since 2019, as the wife of Governor Gavin Newsom.

In 2019 her role was renamed from "First Lady" to "First Partner" in order to be more gender inclusive. She had previously served as Second Lady of California from 2011 to 2019 and First Lady of San Francisco from 2008 to 2011, in accordance with her husband's earlier posts.

She wrote, directed, and produced the film Miss Representation (2011), which premiered in the documentary competition at the Sundance Film Festival. The film examines how the media have underrepresented women in positions of power.

The Mask You Live In (2015), the second film she wrote, directed, and produced, scrutinizes American society's definition of masculinity.

== Early life and education ==
Jennifer Lynn Siebel was born in San Francisco, California on June 19, 1974 and grew up in the suburb of Ross, California. She is the second cousin once removed to Thomas Siebel.

Jennifer is the second oldest of five girls and attended Ross Grammar School and The Branson School. At six years old, she accidentally ran over her older sister, Stacey, with a golf cart, killing her. Siebel Newsom has stated that she still feels survivor's guilt over her sister's death. During high school, she played varsity basketball, soccer, and tennis. She later graduated with honors from Stanford University, where she earned a Bachelor of Arts degree in Latin American studies in 1996 and Master of Business Administration in 2001.

At Stanford, she was recruited to play on the women's soccer team. While pursuing her MBA, Siebel Newsom also studied at the American Conservatory Theater, where she completed a certificate program. After completing her education, Siebel Newsom traveled to Africa, Latin America, and Europe on assignments with Conservation International, a global environmental coalition.

== Career ==
Siebel Newsom and Governor Newsom presenting the 2019 inductees in the California Hall of Fame.

In 2002, Siebel Newsom moved to Hollywood, where she concentrated on building her acting career. Siebel Newsom earned many roles in television, film, and theater. She has appeared on such television shows as Life, Mad Men, Strong Medicine, and Numb3rs.

Miss Representation premiered at the 2011 Sundance Film Festival to mostly positive reviews. The film went on to screen at numerous other festivals, including the San Francisco International Film Festival, Athena Film Festival and won the Audience Award at the Palo Alto International Film Festival. The film interweaves stories from teenage girls with interviews with, among others, Condoleezza Rice, Lisa Ling, Nancy Pelosi, Katie Couric, Rosario Dawson, and Gloria Steinem discussing the media and its message regarding women. On February 10, 2011, Oprah Winfrey announced that she had acquired the film for the OWN Documentary Film Club. Funding for the film included contributions from corporations like Pacific Gas and Electric Company (PG&E), which donated to The Representation Project, the nonprofit behind Siebel Newsom's filmmaking efforts.

Siebel Newsom raised $101,111 on Kickstarter to fund the production of her second film The Mask You Live In, which premiered at the 2015 Sundance Film Festival. Her third film was The Great American Lie. She directed the documentary film Fair Play in 2022. Several of her films, including Miss Representation and others produced through The Representation Project, received financial support from PG&E, a major California utility company with interests regulated by the state government.

Siebel Newsom co-founded The Representation Project, an organization which works to end gender stereotypes. The Representation Project's board members include Jan Yanehiro, Nathan Ballard, Susie McCormick, and Maureen Pelton. In 2021, The Sacramento Bee revealed that from 2011 to 2018, Siebel Newsom earned $2.3 million from her film work through her nonprofit organization, which had received $800,000 in donations from companies with business before California's government as her husband Gavin Newsom's political career ascended, and continued to draw her salary after he became governor. While the practice is allowed by California law, outside ethics experts expressed concerns about conflicts of interest; a spokesperson for The Representation Project said Siebel Newsom had not overseen fundraising since 2015.

== Personal life ==
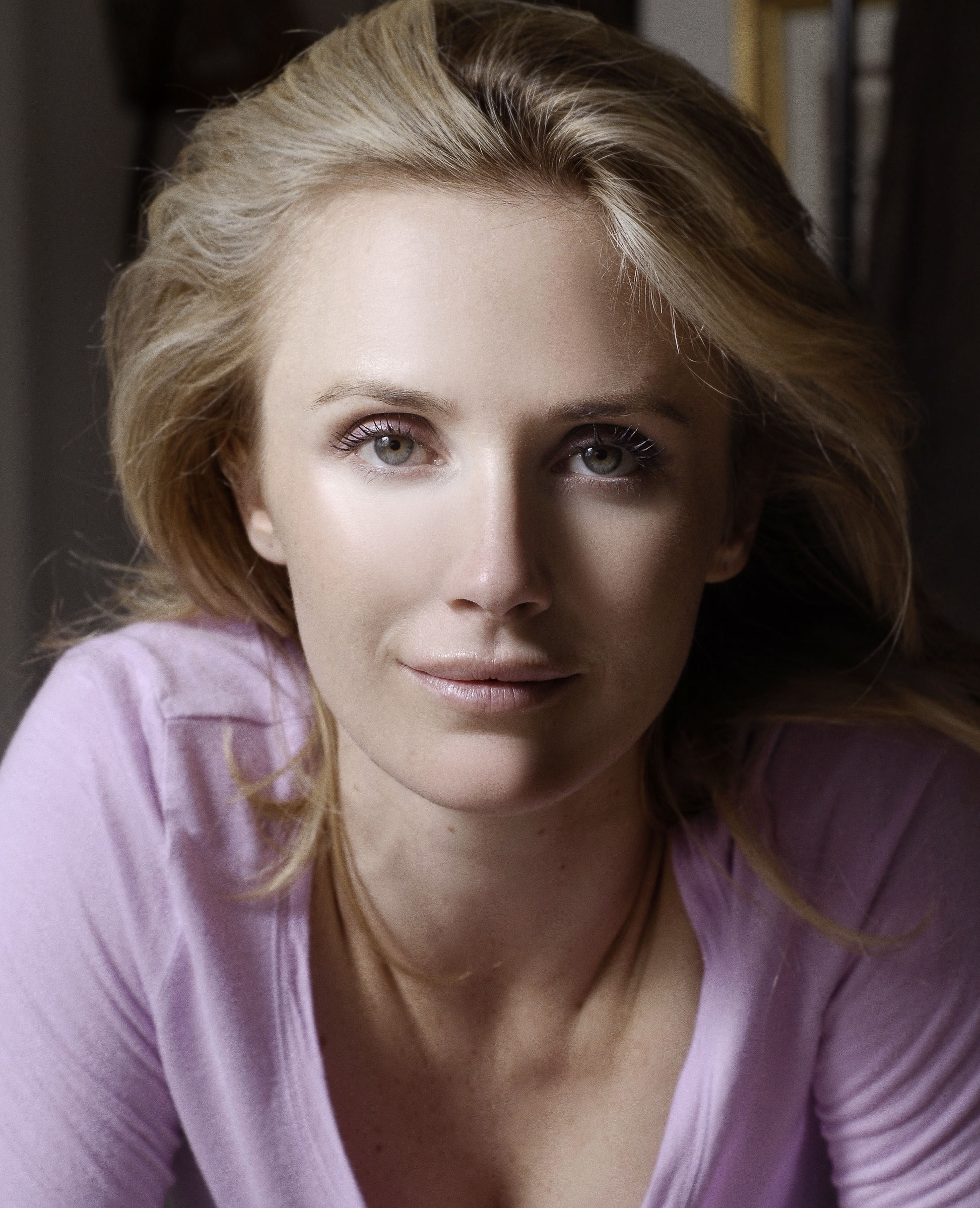
Siebel Newsom in 2006

In the early 2000s, Siebel Newsom dated actor George Clooney.

She met Gavin Newsom on a blind date set up by a mutual friend at the Yerba Buena Center for the Arts in October 2006. The couple announced their engagement in January 2008. They wed in July of the same year at her parents' ranch in Stevensville, Montana, and have four children.

In 2011, Siebel Newsom and her family moved from San Francisco to Kentfield, where she had grown up. In 2019, Siebel Newsom and her family moved to Fair Oaks, California.

Her sister Melissa Siebel is married to Joshua Irwing Schiller, son of Boies Schiller Flexner LLP co-founder Jonathan Schiller.

Siebel Newsom was registered as a Republican until 2008, before re-registering as No Party Preference. Prior to registering as an independent voter, she accidentally registered with the far-right American Independent Party, before correcting her party to "decline to state".

Siebel Newsom was one of several accusers against Harvey Weinstein in his 2022 Los Angeles criminal rape and sexual assault trial. In November 2022, Siebel Newsom testified in court that, in 2005, Weinstein had raped her in a hotel room, having lured her there under the pretenses of holding a professional discussion about film projects. Weinstein's attorney claimed what took place was "consensual, transactional sex". The jury was unable to reach a verdict on Siebel Newsom's accusation. However, the jury found Weinstein guilty on three counts pertaining to another accuser. Weinstein, who was already two years into a 23-year sentence for a rape and sexual assault conviction in New York, was sentenced to 16 years in prison for the Los Angeles verdict. In 2021, Rose McGowan claimed Siebel Newsom tried to bribe McGowan in 2017 to stay quiet on Weinstein.

== Filmography ==
=== Film ===
Year	Title	Role	Notes
2003	Hades Night	Klara	
2003	Something's Gotta Give	Younger Woman in Market	
2004	Dinocroc	Gereco Receptionist	
2004	Zen Noir	Nora	
2004	American Daylight	Zelda	
2005	Raw Footage	Monica	
2005	Rent	Receptionist	
2006	Late Night Girls	Julie	
2007	Fall Guy: The John Stewart Story	Sharon Stone	
2007	The Trouble with Romance	Jill	
2007	Bone Dry	Wife	
2007	In the Valley of Elah	Jodie	
2008	April Fool's Day	Barbie	Direct-to-DVD
2008	The Butler's in Love	Eleanor (as Jennifer Siebel)	3-D Short Film
2009	Aliens on Crack	Pooty	
2009	Down for Life	Ms. Hardwicke	
2009	The Magnificent Cooly-T	Sammy	
2010	Tales of an Ancient Empire	Queen Ma'at	
2017	She's Out of His Mind	Judy	
TBA	Sleeping with the Lion	Coral	

=== Television ===
Year	Title	Role	Notes
2002	She Spies	Woman #2	Episode: "First Episode"
2002	Presidio Med	Cyndy Lloyd	4 episodes
2003	Strong Medicine	Nancy Donahue	Episode: "Misdiagnosis Murder"
2003	The Proud Family	The Counselor	Episode: "The Camp, the Counselor, the Mole and the Rock"
2004	Cracking Up	Trish	Episode: "Grudge Match"
2005	Numbers	Diane Rausch	Episode: "Bettor or Worse"
2007–2008	Life	Jennifer Conover	9 episodes
2008	Mad Men	Juanita Carson	Episode: "For Those Who Think Young"
2008	The Nanny Express	Pam	Television film
2009	Trauma	Stephanie	Episode: "Pilot"
2010	The Glades	Stephanie Chapman	2 episodes

== Notes ==
Honorary titles
Preceded by Laura Maldonado	Second Lady of California; 2011-2019	Succeeded by Markos Kounalakis as Second Partner
Preceded by Anne Gust Brown as First Lady	First Partner of California; 2019-present	Current holder
Vacant Title last held by Kimberly Guilfoyle	First Lady of San Francisco; 2008–2011	Succeeded by Anita Lee
