= The Mask You Live In =

- Film poster
- Directed by: Jennifer Siebel Newsom
- Written by: Jennifer Siebel Newsom
- Produced by: Jennifer Siebel Newsom
- Release date: January 5, 2015 (Sundance Film Festival)
- Country: United States
- Language: English

The Mask You Live In is a 2015 documentary film written, directed, and produced by Jennifer Siebel Newsom. It premiered at the 2015 Sundance Film Festival. The film explores what Newsom perceives to be harmful notions about masculinity in mainstream American culture. The film addresses similar themes on identity as her 2011 documentary Miss Representation, such as the impact of gender socialization and gender representation.

== Background ==
Newsom's inspiration for making the film came from becoming pregnant with her son. In an interview she said, "It was really important to me that I could nurture a son who could be true to his authentic self, who wouldn't always feel like he had to prove his masculinity. There's so much loneliness, pain, and suffering when one is pretending to be someone that they're not." Newsom raised $101,111 on Kickstarter towards making the film.

== Reception ==
The film received mixed reviews and currently holds a 67% on Rotten Tomatoes. Collider's Matt Goldberg recommended that the film be required viewing in classrooms, yet had an overall negative reaction to the movie and its evidence.

== See also ==
- Miss Representation, a 2011 documentary film by Newsom about the impact of media portrayals of women and stereotypes of femininity
