= Anne Gust Brown =

American business executive

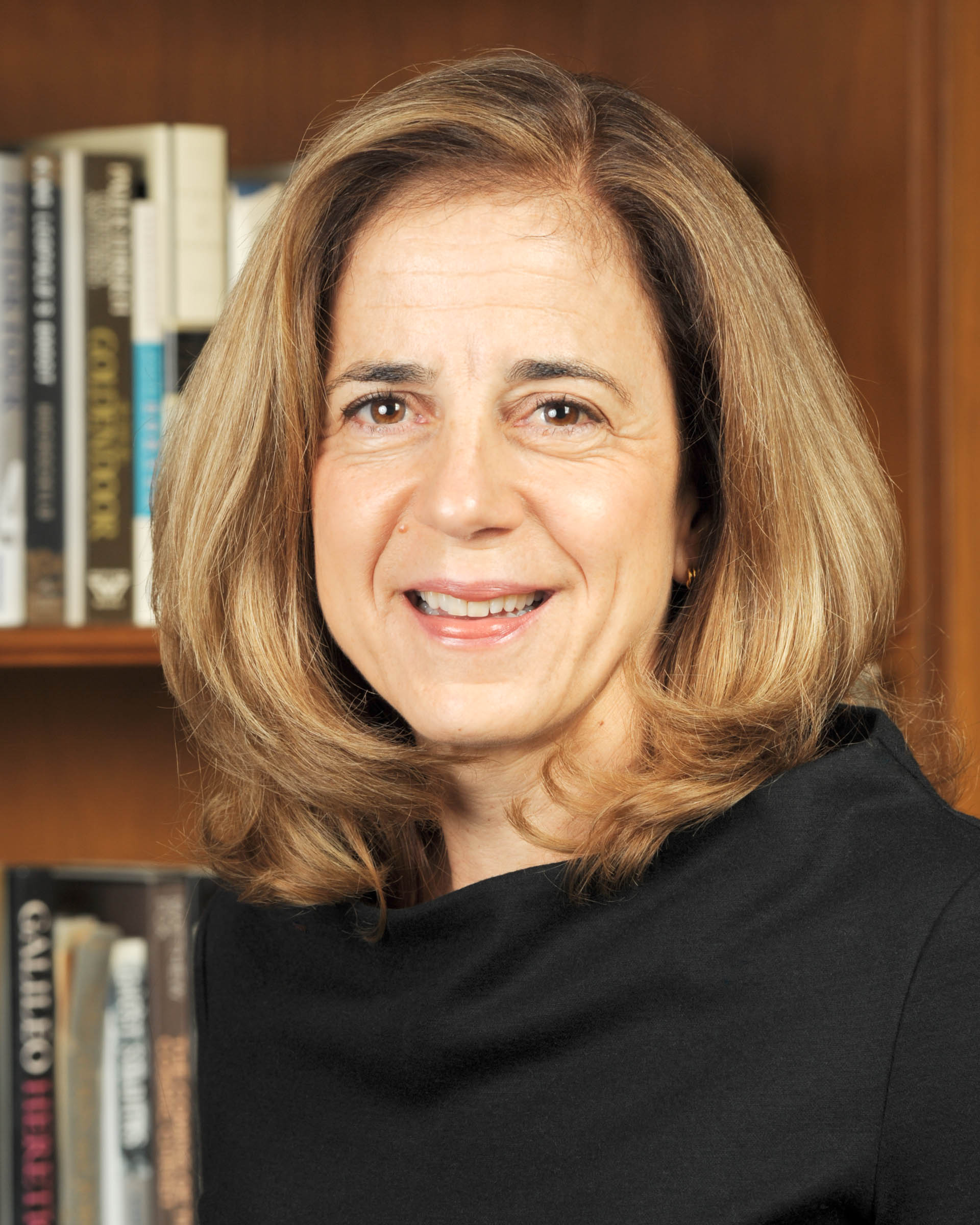
- Official portrait c.2007

First Lady of California
- In role January 3, 2011 – January 7, 2019
- Governor: Jerry Brown
- Preceded by: Maria Shriver
- Succeeded by: Jennifer Siebel Newsom (as first partner)

First Lady of Oakland
- In role June 18, 2005 – January 8, 2007
- Preceded by: Shelia Harris
- Succeeded by: Cynthia Dellums

Personal details
- Born: Anne Baldwin Gust; March 15, 1958 (age 68) Bloomfield Hills, Michigan, U.S.
- Party: Democratic
- Spouse: Jerry Brown (m. 2005)
- Education: Stanford University (BA); University of Michigan (JD)

Anne Baldwin Gust Brown (born March 15, 1958) is an American business executive who served as the first lady of California from 2011 to 2019 as the wife of Governor Jerry Brown.

Her career positions include executive vice president for the clothing retailer The Gap and a director of the fast food chain, Jack in the Box, Inc.

== Early life and education ==
Gust was born on March 15, 1958, in Bloomfield Hills, Michigan, to Rockwell T. "Rocky" Gust, Jr. and Anne Baldwin Gust. She graduated at the top of her class in high school, and attended Stanford University, where she graduated with a degree in political science. After graduation, she returned to Michigan to attend the University of Michigan Law School.

== Career ==
After becoming a lawyer, Gust joined clothing retailer Gap Inc. in 1991. She was senior vice president and general counsel from 1994 to 1998, executive vice president of human resources, legal and corporate administration from 1998 to 1999, executive vice president of human resources, legal, global compliance and corporate administration of Gap Inc. from 1999 to 2000, chief compliance officer from 1998 to May 13, 2005, and chief administrative officer and executive vice president from March 2000 to May 13, 2005.

Gust served as a director of Jack in the Box Inc. from January 1, 2003, to February 10, 2010.

== Personal life ==
Gust met Jerry Brown in 1990 at a party, while he was serving as the chairman of the California Democratic Party. She married him in 2005. Gust has been noted for her political influence on the Governor during his time in office.

Honorary titles
Preceded by Maria Shriver	First Lady of California; January 3, 2011 – January 7, 2019	Succeeded by Jennifer Siebel Newsom
