= Peter Hardeman Burnett =

American judge, governor of California

- Burnett, c. 1849

1st Governor of California
- In office December 20, 1849 – January 9, 1851
- Lieutenant: John McDougal
- Preceded by: Bennet C. Riley (as military governor)
- Succeeded by: John McDougal

Associate Justice of the California Supreme Court
- In office January 13, 1857 – October 12, 1857
- Appointed by: Governor J. Neely Johnson
- Preceded by: Solomon Heydenfeldt
- Succeeded by: Stephen J. Field

5th Supreme Judge of the Provisional Government of Oregon
- In office September 6, 1845 – December 29, 1846
- Preceded by: James Nesmith
- Succeeded by: Jesse Quinn Thornton

Personal details
- Born: November 15, 1807 Nashville, Tennessee, U.S.
- Died: May 17, 1895 (aged 87) San Francisco, California, U.S.
- Resting place: Santa Clara Mission Cemetery
- Party: Democratic
- Spouse: Harriet Rogers (m. 1828; died 1879)
- Children: 6
- Relatives: Caius T. Ryland (son-in-law)

Peter Hardeman Burnett (November 15, 1807 – May 17, 1895) was an American politician, the first elected governor of California from December 20, 1849, to January 9, 1851. Burnett was elected Governor almost one year before California's admission to the Union as the 31st state on September 9, 1850. (Note: California was never a US territory; it was occupied territory under military authority. A new representative government began when California ratified its constitution in 1849, and Burnett took office following the election in November as the 33rd governor in the continuous sequence since Portolá.)

Raised in a slave-owning family in Missouri, Burnett moved westward after his business career left him heavily in debt. Initially residing in Oregon Country, he became Supreme Judge of the Provisional Government of Oregon. While in Oregon politics, he pushed for the total exclusion of African Americans from the territory. He authored the "Burnett's lash law" that authorized the flogging of any free blacks who refused to leave Oregon; the law was deemed "unduly harsh" and went unenforced before voters rescinded it in 1845.

In 1848, Burnett moved to California during the height of the California gold rush. He re-established his political career and was elected governor in 1849. Though Burnett himself had previously been a slave-owner in Tennessee, Burnett opposed calls to make California a slave state, instead pushing for the total exclusion of African Americans in California. Burnett signed into law the Act for the Government and Protection of Indians, which enabled the enslavement of Native Californians and contributed to their genocide. He declared in an 1851 speech, "[t]hat a war of extermination will continue to be waged between the races until the Indian race becomes extinct must be expected. While we cannot anticipate the result with but painful regret, the inevitable destiny of the race is beyond the power and wisdom of man to avert." Efforts by federal negotiators to preserve some Native land rights were fought by the administration of Burnett, who favored the elimination of California's indigenous peoples. Furthermore, Burnett is noted for being an early proponent of the exclusion of Chinese immigrant laborers from California, and following his governorship would advocate for the federal Chinese Exclusion Act.

He was appointed to serve on the Supreme Court of California in 1857. In this capacity, Burnett unsuccessfully ordered the extradition of Archy Lee, a formerly enslaved man living in Sacramento, back to Mississippi.

== Early life and career ==
Burnett was born on November 15, 1807, in Nashville, Tennessee. He was the eldest son of George and Dorothy Hardeman Burnet. (Note: Peter Burnet added a second "t" to his surname in his teens.) His sisters were Constantia, Elizabeth Ann, and Mary, while his brothers were Glen Owen, George William, James White, and Thomas Smith. Three other sisters died before the age of 5.

Burnett's paternal great-grandfather, James Burnet, was an Irish immigrant and farmer who died in Virginia. Peter's father, George Burnet, was born in Pittsylvania County, Virginia in 1770, and worked as a farmer and carpenter who built several early buildings in Nashville. His mother, Dorothy Hardeman, was the daughter of Thomas Hardeman, who accumulated 5,000 acres in Nashville and was elected to the 1796 Tennessee constitutional convention along with his friend and neighbor Andrew Jackson, the future president. Hardeman also owned several slaves. Burnett later enslaved two people himself. He later insisted that he opposed slavery and did not mention his slaves in his autobiography, however, his ownership of two slaves was corroborated by the 1840 census. Their ultimate fate is uncertain, but he likely took one or both with him to Oregon, with one drowning en route.

He was raised in rural Missouri. In 1828, he married Harriet Rogers. Besides elementary school, Burnett never received a formal education but educated himself in law and government. After owning a general store, he turned to his law career.

== Political career in Oregon ==
In 1843, having failed as a merchant and heavily in debt, Burnett became part of the departure of Easterners moving westward, moving his family from Barry, Missouri to Oregon Country (now modern-day Oregon) to take up farming to solve growing debts in Missouri, an agricultural endeavor that failed. While in Oregon Country, Burnett began his forays into politics, getting elected to the provisional legislature between 1844 and 1848. In 1844, he completed the construction of Germantown Road between the Tualatin Valley and what became Portland. It was during his time in Oregon that Burnett, a traditional Southern Protestant, began to question the practices of his faith, his religious views drifting more to Catholicism. By 1846, Burnett and his family completely transitioned from Protestant to Catholic.

While in the Legislature, and later as Provisional Supreme Judge, Burnett signed Oregon's first exclusion laws. Under an 1844 law passed by the provisional government—just after the same government abolished slavery—slave owners could continue to own slaves for up to three years, after which all African Americans, free or enslaved, had to leave Oregon Country or face flogging.

== Move to California ==
Upon news of the discovery of gold in California in 1848, Burnett and his family moved south to participate in the rush. He arrived at Long's Bar on the Yuba River on November 5 of that year. After modest success in getting gold, Burnett envisioned a career in law in San Francisco, a rapidly growing boomtown thanks largely to the gold rush. On the way to the Bay Area, Burnett met John Augustus Sutter Jr., son of German-born Swiss pioneer John Sutter. Selling his father's deeded lands in the near vicinity of Sutter's Fort, the younger Sutter offered Burnett a job selling land plots for the new town of Sacramento. Over the next year, Burnett made nearly US$50,000 in land sales in Sacramento, a city ideally suited due to its closeness to the Sierra Nevada and the neighboring Sacramento River's navigability for large ships.

In 1848, Burnett was among those who founded the city of Oregon City in Butte County, California.

== Governorship of California ==
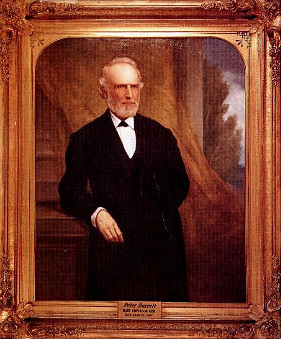
Portrait of Burnett by William F. Cogswell (1879).

In 1849, Burnett announced his intentions to return to politics. 1849 saw the first California Constitutional Convention in Monterey, where territorial politicians drafted documents suitable to admit California as a state in the United States. During the 1849 referendum to adopt the California Constitution, Burnett, now with name recognition in Sacramento and San Francisco and a resume that included the Oregon Provisional Legislature, decided to run for the new territory's first civilian governor, replacing the string of military governors and bureaucracy from the US military. Burnett easily won the election over four other candidates, including John Sutter, and was sworn in as California's first elected civilian governor on December 20, 1849, in San Jose in front of what would soon (after statehood in 1850) become the California State Legislature.

=== Burnett administration ===
In the first days of the Burnett administration, the governor and the California Legislature set out to create the organs of a state government, creating state cabinet posts, archives, executive posts and departments, subdividing the state into 27 counties and appointing John C. Fremont and William M. Gwin as California's senators to the federal US Senate. Despite home proclamations and bureaucratic reorganizations that recognized California now as a US state, the US Congress and President Zachary Taylor had not signed authorization of statehood for California. Part of this miscommunication was due to California's relative remoteness to the rest of the US during the time and to over-enthusiastic attitudes by politicians and the public alike to get California into the Union as quickly as possible. Following long contentious debates in the US Senate, California was admitted as a (non-slave) state on September 9, 1850, as part of the Compromise of 1850. Californians did not learn of their official statehood until one month later, when on October 18, the steamer Oregon entered San Francisco Bay with a banner strapped to her rigging reading "California Is a State".

During those advancements into statehood, Burnett's popularity among the legislature, the press, and the public plummeted. Relations between the legislature and Burnett began to sour in early 1850, when bills pressing for the incorporation of Sacramento and Los Angeles as city municipalities, with Los Angeles being a special incorporation due to its earlier pueblo status during the previous Spanish and Mexican rule, passed the State Assembly and Senate. Burnett vetoed both bills, citing special incorporation bills as unconstitutional and that reviews for municipal incorporation were best left to county courts. The legislature failed to override Burnett's veto of the Los Angeles bill but succeeded in overriding the Sacramento bill, making it California's first incorporated city.

For California's legal system, Burnett recommended to the first session of the state legislature that California should implement a hybrid legal system mixing significant elements of both civil law and common law. He advocated for enacting California versions of the Louisiana Civil Code and the Louisiana Code of Practice (Louisiana's name for what Americans would call a code of civil procedure) and adopting American common law for crimes, evidence, and commercial law. This touched off an uproar among the American lawyers who had flocked to California, with the majority pushing for common law and a minority (led by John W. Dwinelle) advocating the adoption of civil law. The Senate Judiciary Committee, chaired by Elisha Oscar Crosby, published a report in February 1850 recommending the adoption of the common law through the enactment of a reception statute; Burnett signed the resulting bill into law on April 13, 1850.

Characterized as an aloof politician with little support from the Legislature by the San Francisco, Sacramento, and Los Angeles press, Burnett grew frustrated as his agenda ground to a halt, and his governance style was increasingly criticized. He became a regular fixture of ridicule in the state's newspapers and on the floor of the Legislature. With little over a year in office, Burnett, the state's first governor, became the first to resign, announcing his resignation in January 1851. Burnett cited personal matters for his departure. Lieutenant Governor John McDougal replaced Burnett as the Governor of California on January 9.

=== Burnett's policies ===
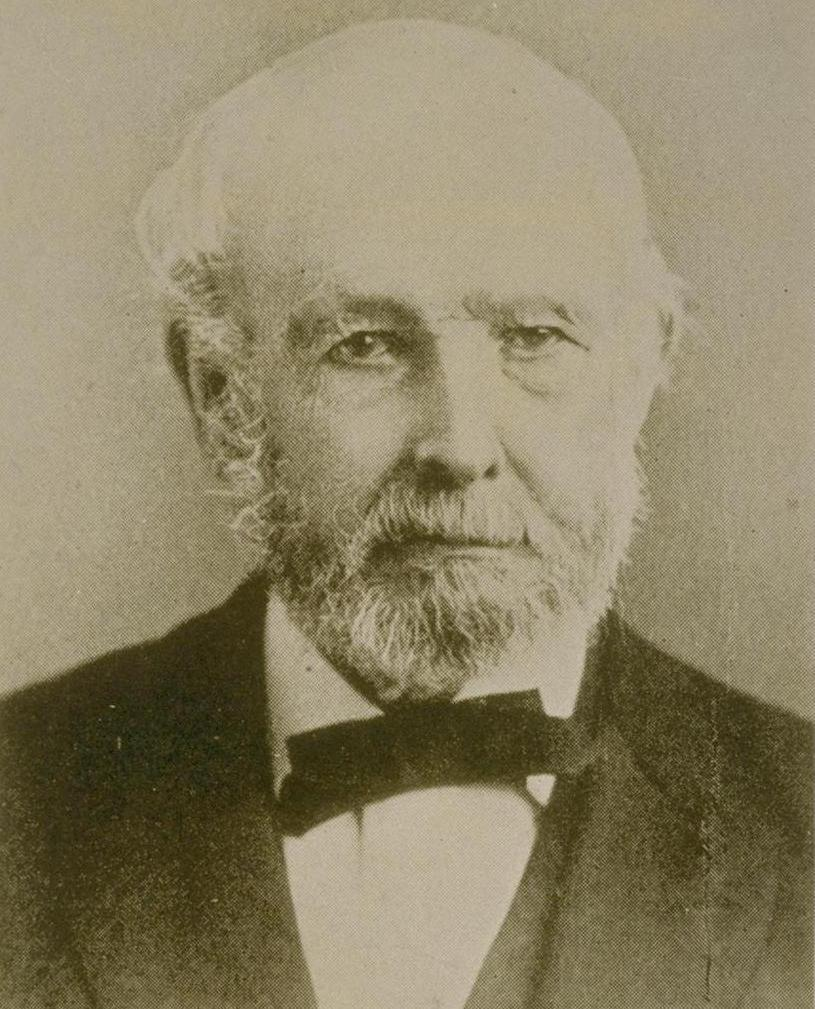
Burnett photographed when he served as president of Pacific Bank.

As Governor, Burnett pushed for the exclusion of African Americans from California, raising the ire of pro-slavery supporters who wanted to import the Southern slave system to the West Coast, but his proposals were defeated in the Legislature. From Burnett's First Annual Message to the Legislature, December 21, 1849:

For some years past I have given this subject [African-American settlement in California] my most serious and candid attention; and I most cheerfully lay before you the result of my own reflections. There is, in my opinion, but one of two consistent courses to take in reference to this class of population; either to admit them to the full and free enjoyment of all the privileges guaranteed by the Constitution to others, or exclude them from the State. If we permit them to settle in our State, under existing circumstances, we consign them, by our own institutions, and the usages of our own society, to a subordinate and degraded position, which is in itself but a species of slavery. They would be placed in a situation where they would have no efficient motives for moral or intellectual improvement, but must remain in our midst, sensible of their degradation, unhappy themselves, enemies to the institutions and the society whose usages have placed them there, and for ever fit teachers in all the schools of ignorance, vice, and idleness. We have certainly the right to prevent any class of population from settling in our State, that we may deem injurious to our own society. Had they been born here, and had acquired rights in consequence, I should not recommend any measures to expel. They are not now here, except a few in comparison with the numbers that would be here; and the object is to keep them out.

Similarly, Burnett also pushed for heavy taxation on foreign immigrants. The 1850 Foreign Miners Tax Act, signed into law by Burnett, required every miner of non-American origin to pay US$20 (~$600.00 in 2025). Burnett also argued heavily for increased taxation and the expansion of capital punishment to include larceny. Burnett also attempted to remove Native Americans, as well as foreign miners. In 1851, federal commissioners negotiated treaties with Native American tribes in California, which the governor then blocked for being too generous in reserving land for the tribes. Instead, the greed for gold wealth led to a second option, with Burnett declaring "[t]hat a war of extermination will continue to be waged between the races until the Indian race becomes extinct must be expected. While we cannot anticipate the result with but painful regret, the inevitable destiny of the race is beyond the power and wisdom of man to avert."

== Post-governorship ==
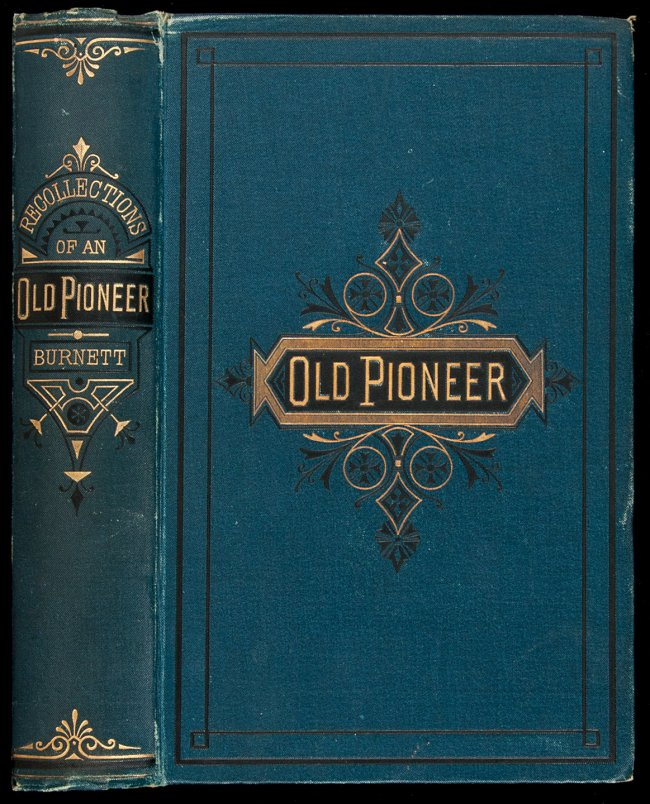
Recollections and opinions of an old pioneer (1880), authored by Burnett.

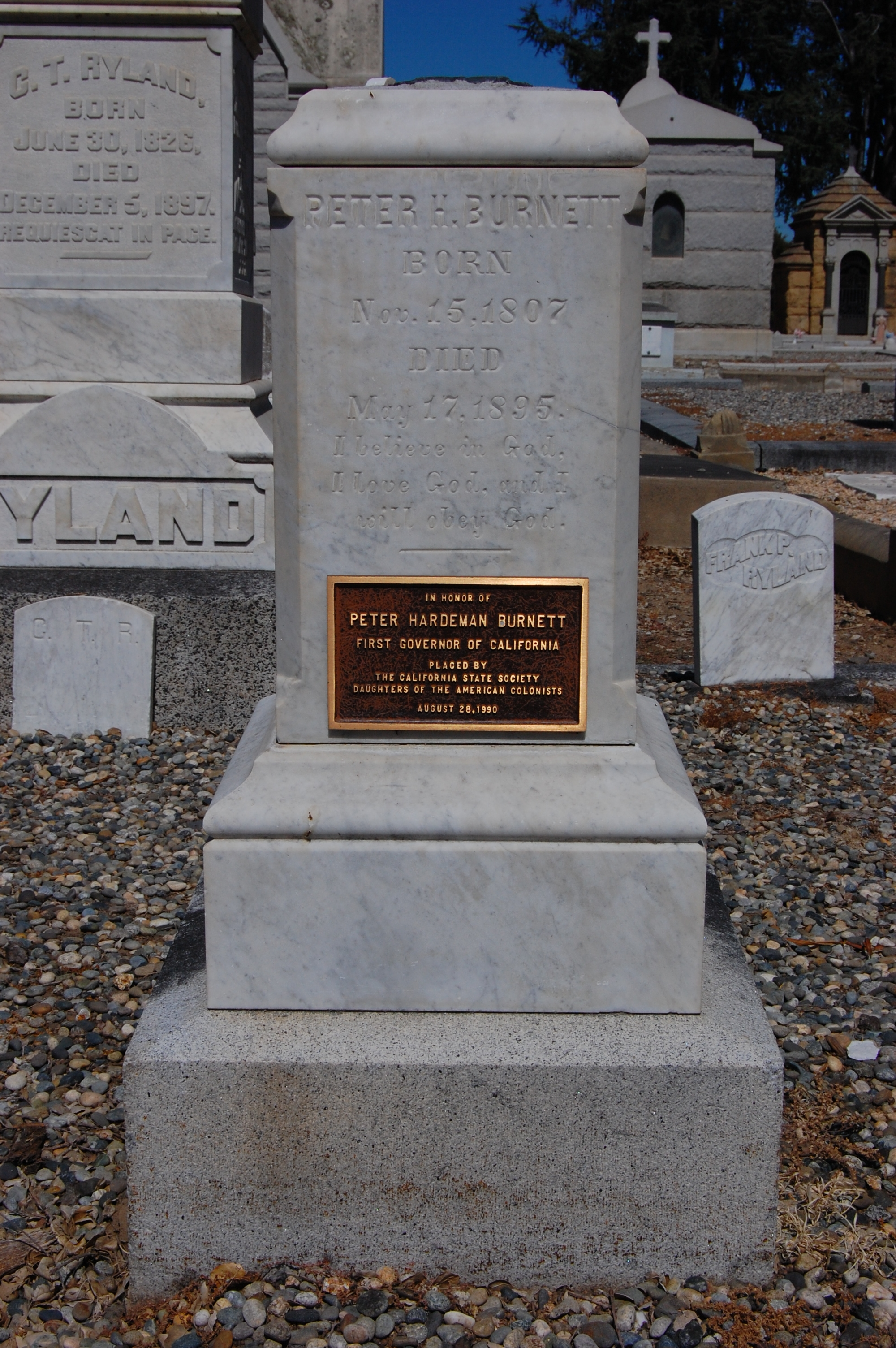
Burnett's grave in Santa Clara Mission Cemetery

One year after leaving the governorship, Burnett could finally repay the heavy debts he had incurred in Missouri nearly two decades before. He entered several careers, serving briefly as a justice in the California Supreme Court between 1857 and 1858, the Sacramento City Council, as well as becoming a San Jose-based lawyer, a noted proponent of Catholicism during the Victorian period, and then the president of the Pacific Bank of San Francisco. Although never venturing into politics much after the 1860s, Burnett actively supported the federal Chinese Exclusion Act of 1882. In 1880, he published an autobiography, Recollections and Opinions of an Old Pioneer. He died May 17, 1895, at 87, in San Francisco and is buried in the Santa Clara Mission Cemetery in Santa Clara, California.

== Legacy ==
Burnett's legacy is racist and exclusionary. While regarded as one of the fathers of modern California in the state's early days, his racist attitudes toward African Americans, Chinese Americans, and Native Americans have tarnished his name today. Burnett's period in the Oregon Provisional Legislature helped facilitate the exclusion of black people from the state until 1926. In 1844, one of his Oregon proposals was to force free black people to leave the state and to institute floggings of any who continued to remain. Referred to as "Burnett's lash law", it was deemed "unduly harsh", and it was never enforced, with voters rescinding it in 1845. Also, his open hostility to foreign laborers influenced some federal and state California legislators to push future xenophobic legislation, such as the Chinese Exclusion Act, 30 years after he departed from the governorship. Burnett was also an open advocate of exterminating local California Indian tribes. This policy continued with successive state governmental administrations for several decades, which offered US$10 to US$25 for evidence of dead Natives. From Burnett's Second Annual Message to the Legislature, January 7, 1851:

That a war of extermination will continue to be waged between the two races until the Indian race becomes extinct, must be expected.

San Francisco's Burnett Avenue near Twin Peaks is named after him. The Burnett Child Development Center, a predominantly black San Francisco neighborhood preschool, had been named for Burnett. However, when his racist positions were rediscovered, the school was renamed in 2011 as Leola M. Havard Early Education School, in honor of San Francisco's first African American principal. Similarly, Peter H. Burnett Elementary School in Long Beach was renamed in 2014 due to Burnett's views. It is now named after Bobbi Smith, the first African American member of the Long Beach Unified School District's board. In 2019, Peter Burnett Middle School in San Jose was renamed Muwekma Ohlone Middle School in honor of the original inhabitants of that area. In July 2020, Peter Burnett Elementary School in Hawthorne was renamed 138th Street Elementary School. In June 2023, Peter Burnett Elementary School in Sacramento was renamed Suy:u (SOO-yoo) Elementary School.

By the 21st century, Burnett was considered an obscure figure in California history. Journalist Ailsa Chang described him as a "footnote" in the state's history. According to Burnett's biographer R. Gregory Nokes, little in-depth material has been written about Burnett, and he notes that Burnett is the only source available for much of his early and later life.

== Notes ==
Political offices
Preceded by Military Governor of California; Bennett C. Riley	Governor of California; 1849–1851	Succeeded by John McDougall
Preceded by Solomon Heydenfeldt	Associate Justice of the California Supreme Court; January 13, 1857–October 12, 1857	Succeeded by Stephen J. Field
