= Lovin' Scoopful =

American ice cream company

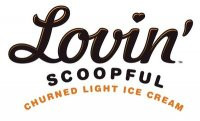
- Founded: Seattle, Washington (2008)
- Industry: Ice Cream
- Products: Lovin' Scoopful
- Website: www.lovinscoopful.com

Lovin' Scoopful is a private company categorized under Ice Cream and Frozen Desserts-Distributors, located in Seattle, Washington. Founded in February, 2008, Lovin' Scoopful donates 25% of its profits to the Special Olympics International. This churned light ice cream focuses in an all-natural base product that comes from the milk and cream of cows not treated with the cow growth hormone, rBST.

== Overview ==
Lovin' Scoopful is a socio-friendly company founded by Daniel H. Samson, Angelo Moratti, Maria Shriver and Timothy P. Shriver, and they are the four principal architects of Lovin' Scoopful LLC.

== Product and flavors ==
Lovin' Scoopful is a churned light premium ice cream composed of half the fat of full fat premium ice cream This brand has a line up of thirteen flavors that include:

- Caramel Chocolate Crispy Treat: Uses creamy vanilla with chocolate covered crispy rice pieces, and then swirl in a thick caramel ribbon.
- Oh My Blueberry Pie: Uses swirled blueberry ribbon into churned light blueberry ice cream and then mixed in sugar coated pie crust pieces.
- Super Duper Peanut Butter Cup: Uses churned light peanut butter ice cream loaded with mini peanut butter cups and slathered in a thick fudge ribbon.
- Mintalicious: Uses green mint flavor by mixing in mint filled milk chocolate hearts along with the chocolate chips.
- Cozy Vanilla: Made with all natural bourbon vanilla extract.
- Out of this World Chocolate: Uses exotic rich chocolate.
- So Good Cookies and Cream: Uses milk chocolate and cookies & cream churned light ice cream.
- Caramel Chocolate Heaven: Churned light caramel ice cream is packed with caramel filled chocolate cups and slathered in a thick fudge ribbon.
- Yummy Cake & Cookie Dough: Uses cake batter mixed in chunks of chocolate and heaps of chocolate chip cookie dough.
- What the Fudge!: Made exotically rich 'Out of This World' chocolate smothered with fudge.
- Baba's Butter Pecan Brittle: Uses butter pecan brittle bits.
- Mad About Mud Pie: Made with coffee, cookies and cream, almonds and fudge.
- Rockin' Raspberry Cheesecake: Made with raspberries and cheesecake bits.

== Distribution ==
Lovin' Scoopful launched its product on February 11, 2008 in Seattle, Washington. This brand began as a regional ice cream servicing Northern California and the Canada–US border on the northern edge of the state of Washington, and it can now be found in most western states and has expanded eastward, available now in thirteen different flavors.
