= Gayle Wilson =

33rd First Lady of California

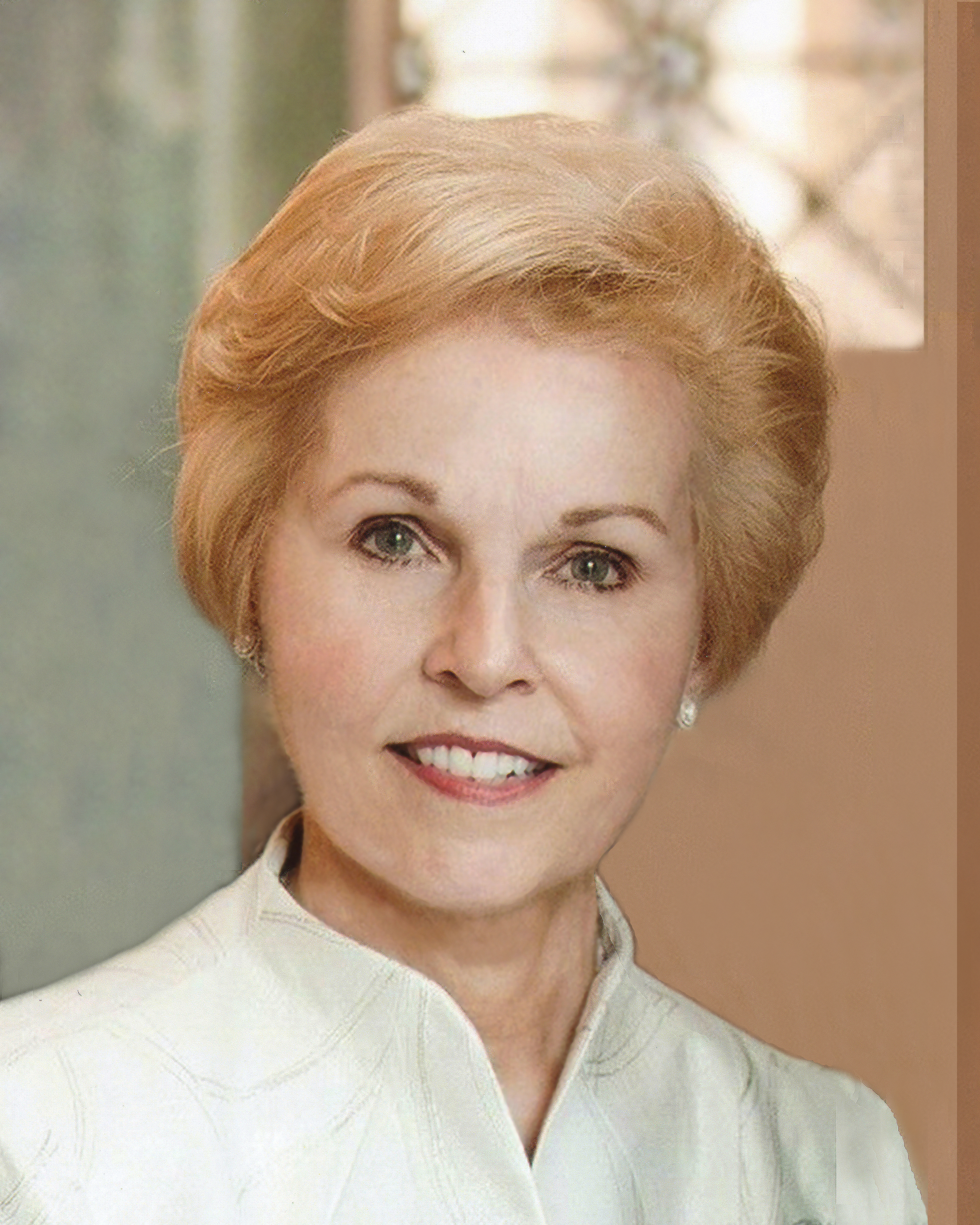
- Official portrait, 1991

First Lady of California
- In role January 7, 1991 – January 4, 1999
- Governor: Pete Wilson
- Preceded by: Gloria Saatjian
- Succeeded by: Sharon Davis

Personal details
- Born: Gayle Ann Edlund; November 24, 1942 (age 83) Phoenix, Arizona, U.S.
- Party: Republican
- Spouse: Pete Wilson (m. 1983)
- Children: 2
- Education: Stanford University (BS)

Gayle Edlund Wilson (born November 24, 1942) is an American business professional, community activist, and the former first lady of California (1991–1999). She is married to former California governor and senator Pete Wilson, with whom she has two sons.

As an activist, Wilson has concentrated her efforts on improving early childhood health and encouraging children in the areas of math and science.

== Early life and education ==
Wilson was born in Phoenix, Arizona. As a teenager in February 1956, she acted in a professional production of A Room Full of Roses opposite Linda Darnell at the Sombrero Playhouse. Wilson competed in the 1960 National Science Talent Search. Wilson attended Stanford University, where she earned a degree in biology and a Phi Beta Kappa key.

== Career ==
=== First lady of California ===
As California's first lady, Wilson worked to further her husband's goals of promoting early childhood education. She also helped establish a merit-based California state summer school for math and science, now known as COSMOS. Each summer this four-week residential program located on four University of California campuses serves over 600 high school aged students.

=== Later career ===
Wilson is a member of the board of directors of Gilead Sciences and the Ralph M. Parsons Foundation. She is a member of the Board of Trustees of California Institute of Technology and Sanford Burnham Prebys Medical Discovery Institute, and she is the chairperson of the Advisory Board and primary fundraiser for COSMOS. She is a former member of the board of ARCO as well as of the Center for Excellence in Education.

Wilson is a past president of the Junior League of San Diego as well as a founding member of the San Diego chapter of ARCS (Achievement Rewards for College Scientists).

Since 2011, Wilson has been on the selection committee for the GE Reagan Scholarships.

== Personal life ==
Wilson has two sons and one grandchild.

Honorary titles
Preceded by Gloria Saatjian	First Lady of California; January 7, 1991 – January 4, 1999	Succeeded by Sharon Davis
