= John McDougal =

American politician (1818–1866)

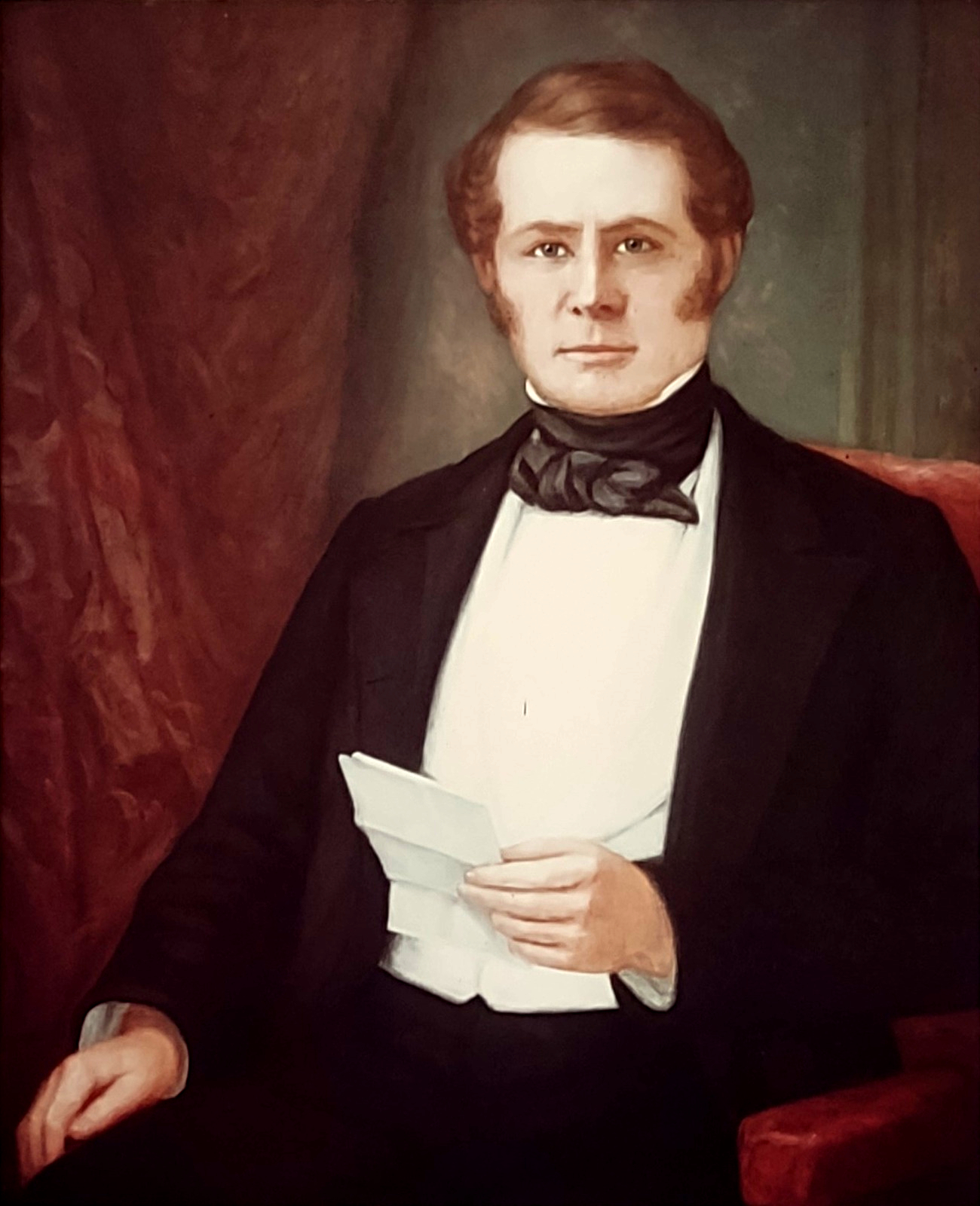

2nd Governor of California
- In office January 9, 1851 – January 8, 1852
- Lieutenant: David C. Broderick (acting)
- Preceded by: Peter H. Burnett
- Succeeded by: John Bigler

1st Lieutenant Governor of California
- In office December 20, 1849 – January 9, 1851
- Governor: Peter H. Burnett
- Preceded by: Position established
- Succeeded by: David C. Broderick

Personal details
- Born: c. 1818 Union, Ohio, U.S.
- Died: March 30, 1866 (aged 47–48) San Francisco, California, U.S.
- Party: Independent Democrat
- Spouse: Jane McDougal
- Children: 5

John McDougal (c. 1818 – March 30, 1866) was an American politician who served as the second governor of California from January 9, 1851, until January 8, 1852. Prior to this, he served from 1849 to 1851 as the first lieutenant governor of California.

Born to a political family in Ohio, McDougal would immigrate to California in 1849 aboard the S.S. California after serving in the Mexican–American War. After participating in the California Gold Rush, McDougal would enter early California politics a year later as an attendee of the 1849 constitutional convention in Monterey. Entering the lieutenant governorship in 1849, he would succeed to the governorship following the early resignation of Peter Hardeman Burnett.

As Governor, McDougal presided over the creation of the Mariposa Battalion, a state militia unit that killed over 40 Indigenous Californians during the California Indian Wars. McDougal signed legislation to move the state capital from San Jose to Vallejo in modern-day Solano County. After failing to secure the nomination of the California Democratic Party in the 1852 election, McDougal left office and never served in a political capacity for the rest of his life.

== Biography ==
McDougal was born in Union, Ohio ca. 1818 to John McDougall, an Ohio state representative from 1813 to 1815, and Margaret Stockton. The family produced four other sons: William Creighton McDougall, married to abolitionist Frances Harriet Whipple Green McDougall; Dr. Charles McDougall, also known as Charles Dougall, surgeon in the U.S. Army; Admiral David McDougal, commander of USS Wyoming during the Battle of Shimonoseki; and George P. McDougal, California and Colorado pioneer. The family later moved to Indianapolis.

In 1846 McDougal joined the Indiana Volunteer Infantry as a lieutenant in the 1st Indiana Volunteer Infantry Regiment and served in the Mexican–American War. He was soon elected as captain of Company H. He later re-enlisted in the 5th Indiana Volunteer Infantry Regiment.

In 1848, after the Mexican–American War, McDougal moved to California, arriving in 1849 aboard S.S. California with his wife Jane and their daughter Sue. He worked as a miner and then a merchant during the gold rush. Shortly after his arrival, he entered into the new territory's politics, attending the first constitutional convention in Monterey in 1849. McDougal was one of the original signers of the Constitution of California. During the convention, McDougal was nominated for lieutenant governor, whereupon he remarked, "I reckon I'll take that. I don't believe anyone else will have it." After defeating five other contenders for the office, McDougal was sworn in as the state's first lieutenant governor in December 1849, along with Peter Burnett as the state's first governor.

== Governorship ==
Due to widespread discontent with his administration by the California State Legislature and press, Burnett resigned from the governorship in early January 1851. McDougal assumed the post on January 9. He was relatively inexperienced with any political office. In one of his first acts, McDougal signed legislation sponsored by state senator and former Mexican general Mariano Vallejo on February 4 to remove the capitol from its cramped quarters in San Jose forty miles north to Vallejo.

In the first weeks of his governorship, McDougal was pressured by miners and residents in Mariposa County to intervene in a growing conflict later known as the Mariposa War, with the local Miwok, Chowchilla, and Yokuts tribes opposing encroachment on their land. In late January, he authorized the creation of the 200-man Mariposa Battalion, a state militia unit, to tackle natives he believed were in open rebellion against the state government. In the ensuing conflict, which left over forty dead, the Mariposa Battalion became the first Whites to see Yosemite, while the local tribes ceased violent reprisals on the miner and trader population.

While McDougal continued with the earlier policies of the Burnett administration in taking violent action against California Native Americans and supporting exclusion laws prohibiting African Americans from entering California, he favored Chinese immigration to meet the state's labor shortage and settle undeveloped lands, declaring in his address to the State Legislature on January 7, 1852, that the Chinese "were one of the most worthy classes of our newly adopted citizens, to whom the climate and the character of California were peculiarly suited."

McDougal's popularity peaked in the early days of his administration. Known for his earthy personality, McDougal's demeanor connected well with Sierra Nevada miners and Mexican–American War veterans. However, recurring drinking, gambling with assembly and senate members, and frequent quarrels over minor bureaucratic matters hurt his political career. McDougal's political mannerisms were also a source of popular amusement. McDougal issued so many proclamations beginning, "I, John McDougal," that the Governor was soon known throughout the state as "I John".

Towards the end of 1851, McDougal quarreled with the growing vigilante movement in San Francisco. In a gubernatorial proclamation, he openly condemned the movement's lynching of two criminals that year, citing its complete disregard of the city's municipal authorities. State law enforcement was still in its infancy, however, and his proclamation was ignored. Bureaucratic frustration with San Francisco's vigilante movement would return again during the administration of Governor J. Neely Johnson five years later.

During the 1851 state general elections, the Democratic Party refused to renominate McDougal as the party's choice for governor. Instead, state Democrats nominated Assembly Speaker John Bigler as their party's nominee.

== Post-political career ==
McDougal left office on January 8, 1852, after completing the single two-year term left vacant by previous Governor Burnett. At the time, California governors served two-year terms, a limit that would not change until the governorship of Leland Stanford in the early 1860s. Just four days after leaving the state's highest office, McDougal was involved in a pistol duel with A.C. Russell, editor of The San Francisco Picayune. Russell's hand was injured in the duel. After attempting to start yet another duel with another individual who had insulted the ex-governor, McDougal was arrested by the San Francisco police. As governor, McDougal had opposed state legislation that would have outlawed dueling, remarking duelers were not fit to live and would eventually kill each other off.

Never taken as a serious political candidate again, McDougal fell out of public view after 1852. The former governor increasingly turned to alcohol as he sank into deep depression. According to some accounts, McDougal attempted suicide on several occasions. McDougal died in San Francisco on March 30, 1866, at the age of 48. Along with J. Neely Johnson, McDougal is one of the youngest governors to die after leaving office. He was buried in Laurel Hill Cemetery in San Francisco, sharing a plot with his brother David McDougal. When this cemetery was removed from San Francisco, his remains were moved to the Laurel Hill Mound of Cypress Lawn Memorial Park in Colma, California.

John Eldredge was cast as Governor McDougal in "The Blonde King," a 1959 episode of the syndicated anthology series Death Valley Days, hosted by Stanley Andrews. In the storyline, James D. Savage (Lane Bradford) has made many friends among Indians of the Yosemite region. When John Trask (Brad Johnson) threatens to disrupt the peace, Savage must stop him. Robert Brubaker played Major Warren.

Political offices
Preceded by Position established	Lieutenant Governor of California; 1849–1851	Succeeded by David C. Broderick
Preceded by Peter Hardeman Burnett	Governor of California; 1851–1852	Succeeded by John Bigler
