= Sharon Davis =

First Lady of California from 1999 to 2003

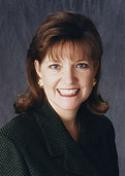

First Lady of California
- In role January 4, 1999 – November 17, 2003
- Governor: Gray Davis
- Preceded by: Gayle Wilson
- Succeeded by: Maria Shriver

Second Lady of California
- In role January 2, 1995 – January 4, 1999
- Governor: Gray Davis
- Preceded by: Jacqueline McCarthy
- Succeeded by: Arcelia Bustamante

Personal details
- Born: Sharon Ryer; May 6, 1954 (age 72) Brentwood, Los Angeles, U.S.
- Party: Democratic
- Spouse: Gray Davis (m. 1980)
- Profession: Writer, activist

Sharon Ryer Davis (born May 6, 1954) is an American author who served as first lady of California from 1999 to 2003. She is the wife of former California governor Gray Davis. She previously served as second lady of California from 1995 to 1999. Davis is also a former Miss Santee and the author of the children's book, The Adventures of Capitol Kitty.

== Early life ==
Davis attended Santana High School in Santee, California. While there, she entered the Miss Santee contest and won. Shortly after high school she began working at Pacific Southwest Airlines as a flight attendant.

== Marriage ==
Sharon met Gray Davis in 1979 while he was Chief of Staff for then California Governor Jerry Brown.

== First Lady of California ==
As First Lady, Davis was active in children's health and education, especially literacy, creating the Governor's Book Fund, which provided funds for school libraries. She wrote a children's book titled The Adventures of Capitol Kitty to help pay for the fund. She eventually helped raise 750,000 dollars. During the 2000 United States presidential election, her husband was rumored to be a potential vice presidential running mate for Al Gore, but Davis turned it down, with the position eventually going to Joe Lieberman. Davis was also rumored to be a potential presidential candidate in 2004. She left the office of First Lady in November 2003, after her husband's recall.

Honorary titles
Preceded by Gayle Edlund Wilson	First Lady of California; 1999–2003	Succeeded by Maria Shriver
