= Gloria Deukmejian =

First Lady of California (born 1932)

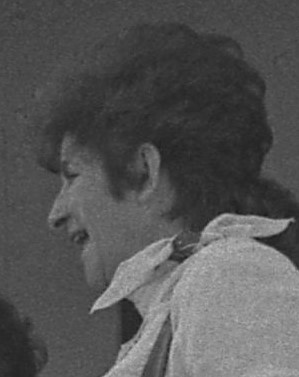
- Deukmejian in 1984

First Lady of California
- In role January 3, 1983 – January 7, 1991
- Governor: George Deukmejian
- Preceded by: Nancy Reagan (1975)
- Succeeded by: Gayle Wilson

Personal details
- Born: Gloria May Saatjian; November 1, 1932 (age 93) Long Beach, California, U.S.
- Party: Republican
- Spouse: George Deukmejian (m. 1957; died 2018)
- Children: Leslie; Andrea; George

Gloria May Deukmejian (née Saatjian; born November 1, 1932) is a former First Lady of California from 1983 to 1991 and the widow of former California Governor George Deukmejian.

Saatjian, the daughter of Armenian immigrants, was introduced to Deukmejian by his sister. They married on February 16, 1957, and had two daughters and one son.

Honorary titles
Preceded by Nancy Reagan	First Lady of California; 1983 – 1991	Succeeded by Gayle Wilson
