= Fort Wood =

Fort Wood may refer to:

- Fort Wood, former fort now serving as the base of the Statue of Liberty
- Fort Wood, 1863 Union fortification in Chattanooga, Tennessee, namesake of Fort Wood Historic District
- Fort Wood, New Orleans, later renamed Fort Macomb

== See also ==
- Fort Leonard Wood, military base in Missouri
