= 1920 Democratic National Convention =

- 1920 presidential election
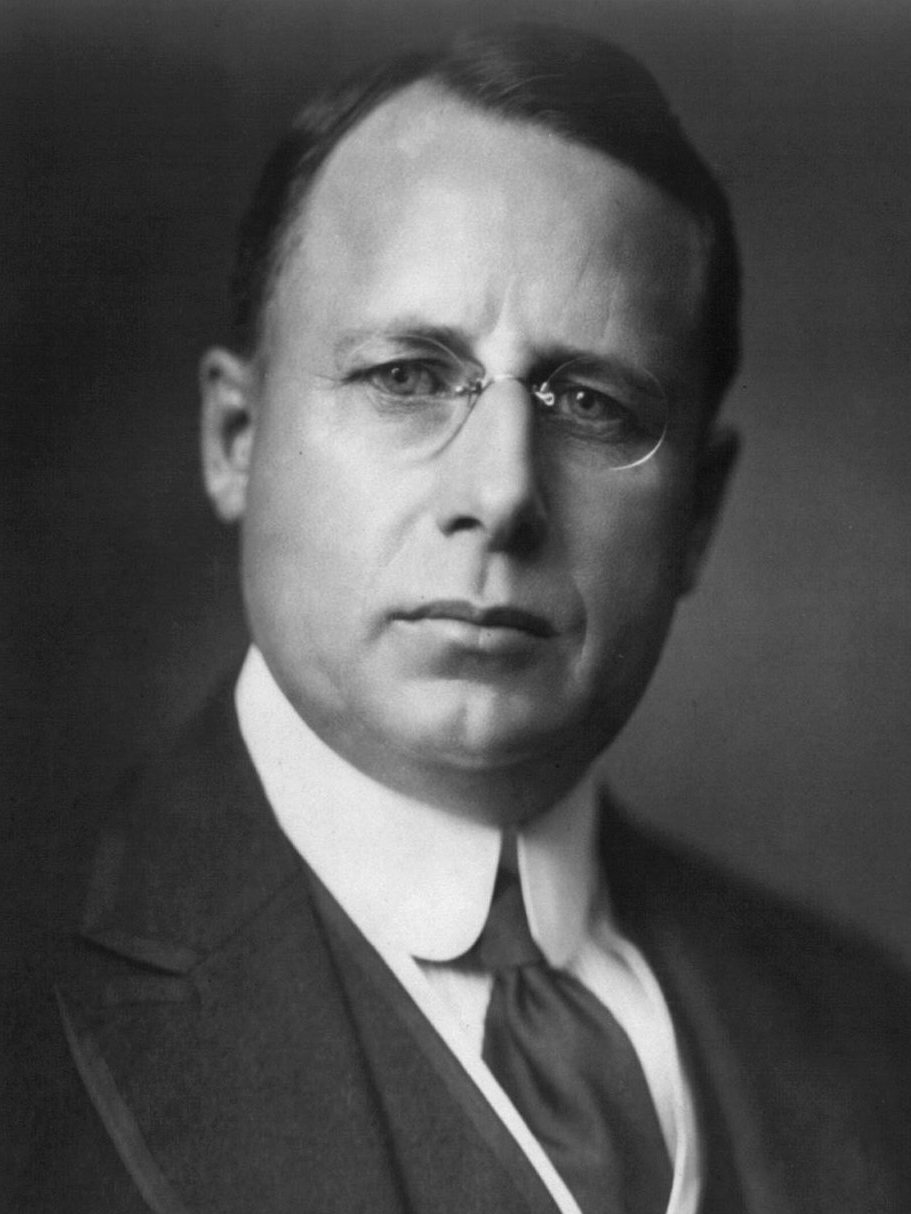
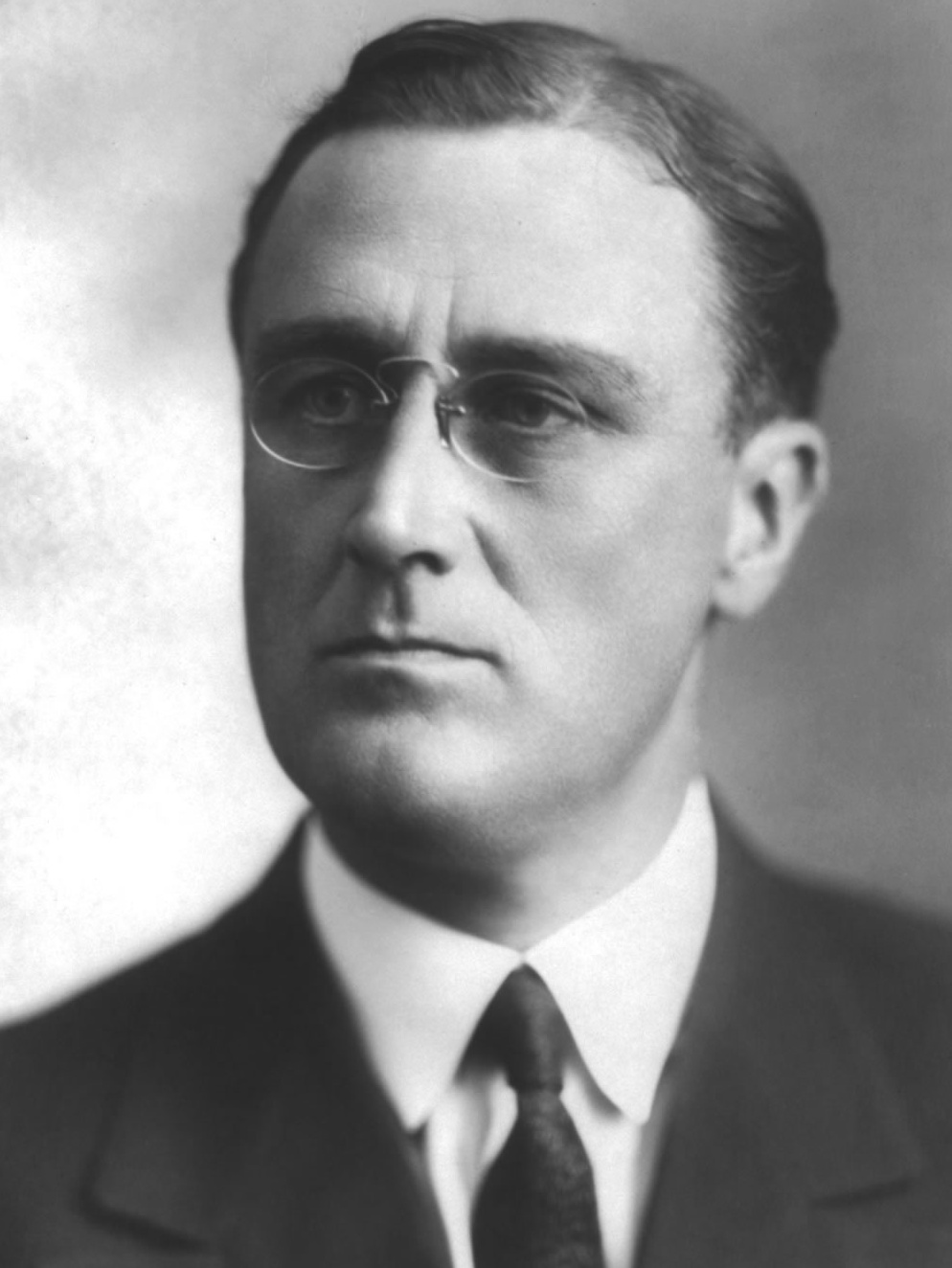
- Nominees; Cox and Roosevelt

Convention
- Dates: June 28 – July 6, 1920
- City: San Francisco, California
- Venue: Civic Auditorium

Candidates
- Presidential nominee: James M. Cox of Ohio
- Vice-presidential nominee: Franklin D. Roosevelt of New York

The 1920 Democratic National Convention was held at the Civic Auditorium in San Francisco, California from June 28 to July 6, 1920. It resulted in the nomination of Governor James M. Cox of Ohio for president and Assistant Secretary of the Navy Franklin D. Roosevelt from New York for vice president. The 1920 Democratic National Convention marked the first time any party had held its nominating convention in a West Coast city.

Neither President Woodrow Wilson, in spite of his failing health, nor former United States Secretary of State and three-time presidential candidate William Jennings Bryan had entirely given up hope that their party would turn to them, but neither was, in the event, formally nominated. In addition to the eventual nominee, Cox, the other high-scoring candidates as the voting proceeded were: Secretary of the Treasury William McAdoo and Attorney General Mitchell Palmer. On the forty-fourth ballot, Governor James M. Cox of Ohio was nominated for the presidency. Cora Wilson Stewart of Kentucky, head of the National Education Association's new illiteracy commission, was chosen to second the nomination for Governor Cox. Mrs. Stewart was selected to replace Kentucky Representative J. Campbell Cantrill, highlighting the candidate's support for what would become the 19th Amendment.

During the drafting of the Democratic Party platform, labor planks were drafted that were described as highly progressive,” with a stance against child labor and an argument made (as noted by one journal) ‘to recognize the right of labor to be represented in collective bargaining by “representatives of their own choosing.”’ The program of a separate woman’s party, which focused on measures such as maternity benefits, insurance and old age pensions was “met favorably,” according to one journal.

The platform adopted by the convention supported the League of Nations, albeit with qualifications, women's suffrage, and measures aimed at helping workers and farmers.

== Presidential candidates ==
Governor
James M. Cox
of Ohio

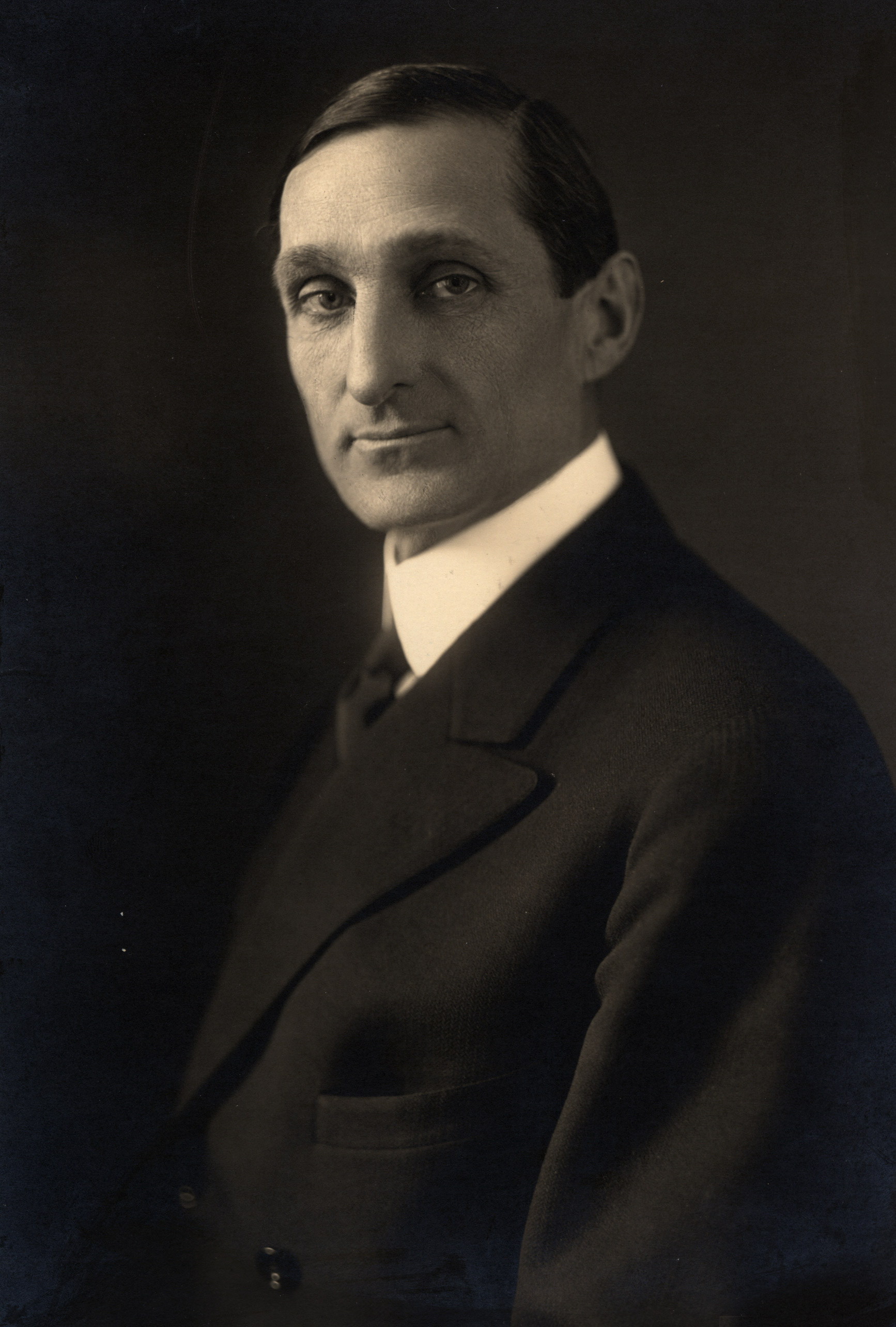
Former Treasury Secretary
William Gibbs McAdoo
of California

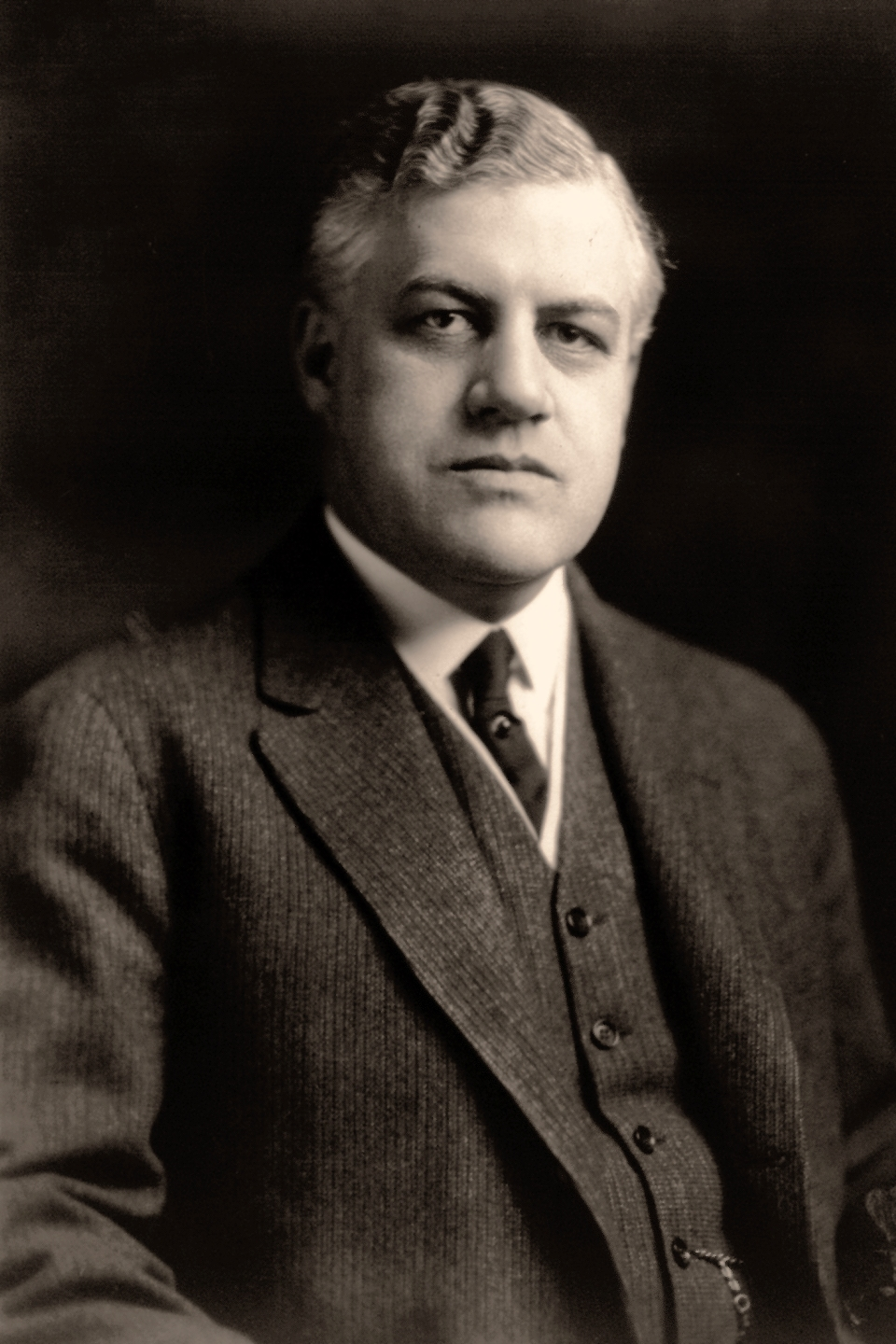
Attorney General
A. Mitchell Palmer
of Pennsylvania

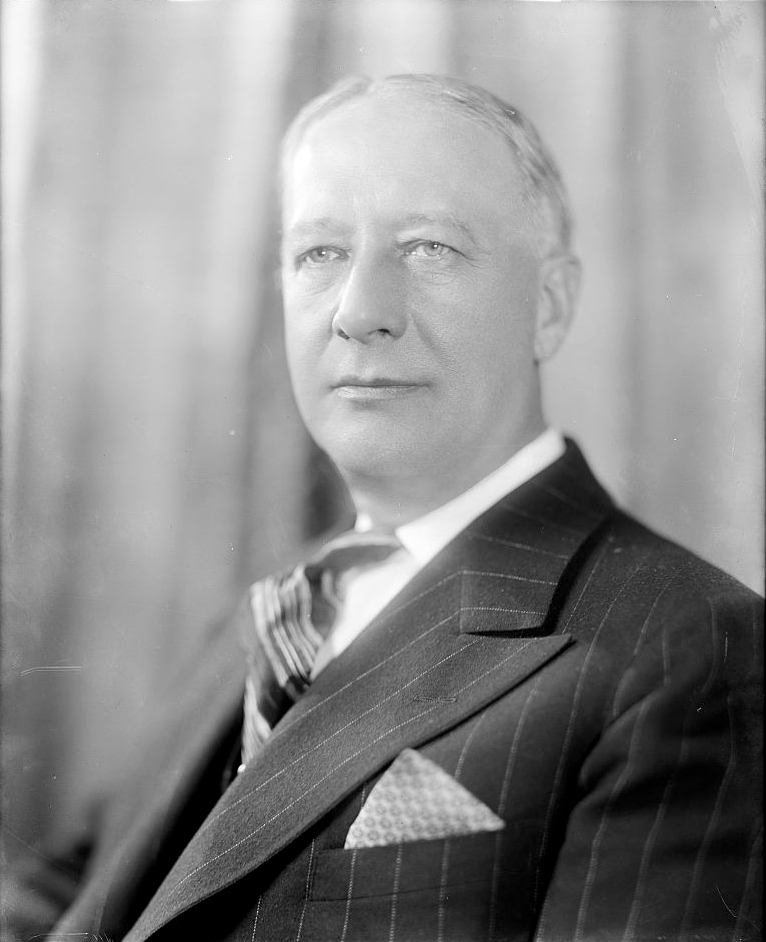
Governor
Al Smith
of New York

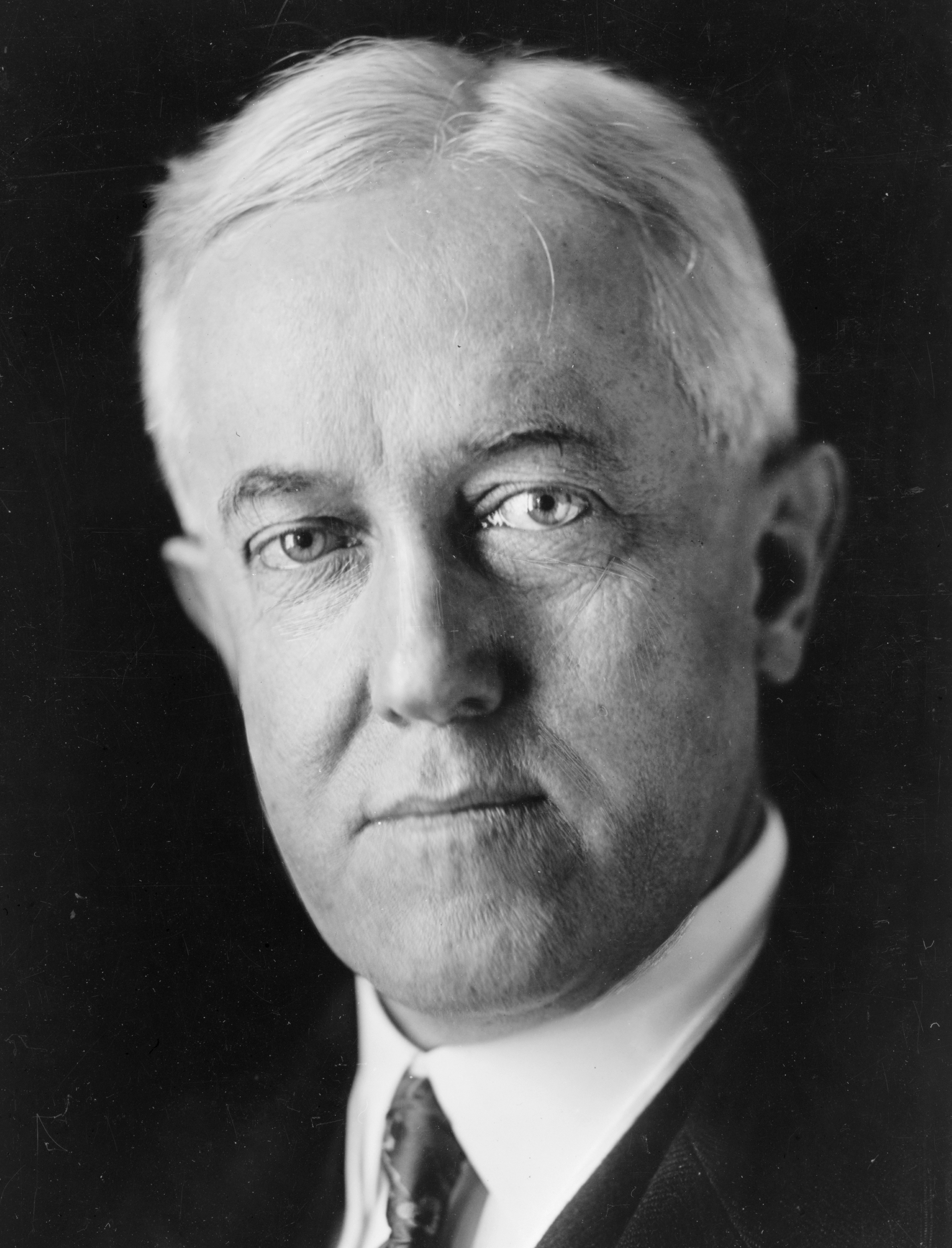
Ambassador
John W. Davis
of West Virginia

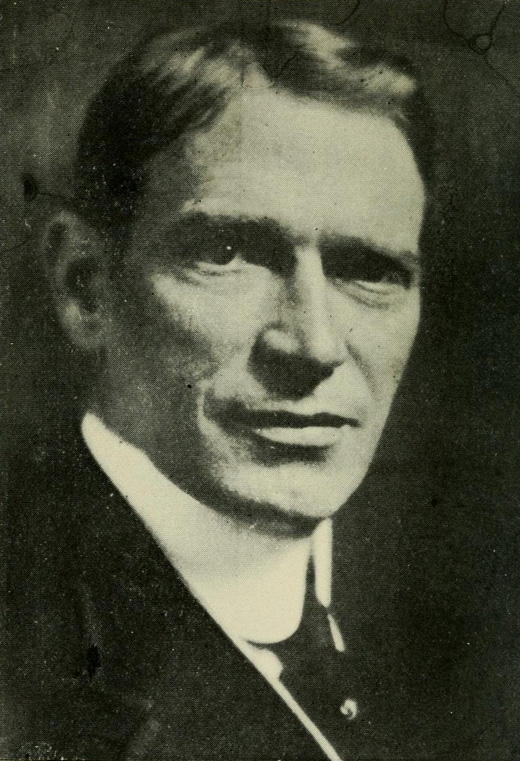
Governor
Edward I. Edwards
of New Jersey

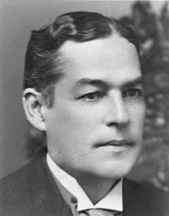
Senator
Robert Latham Owen
of Oklahoma

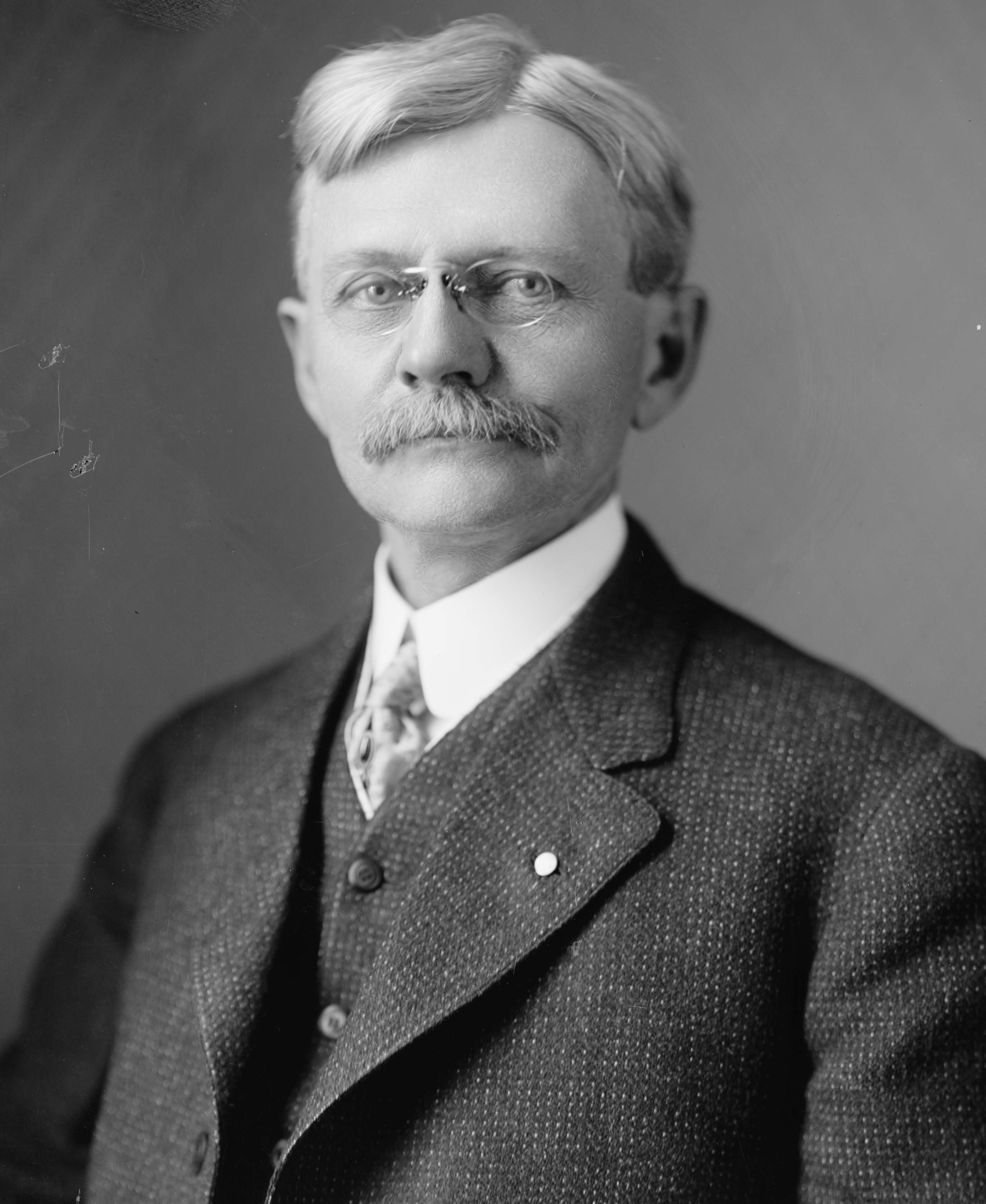
Vice President
Thomas R. Marshall
(Not Formally Nominated)

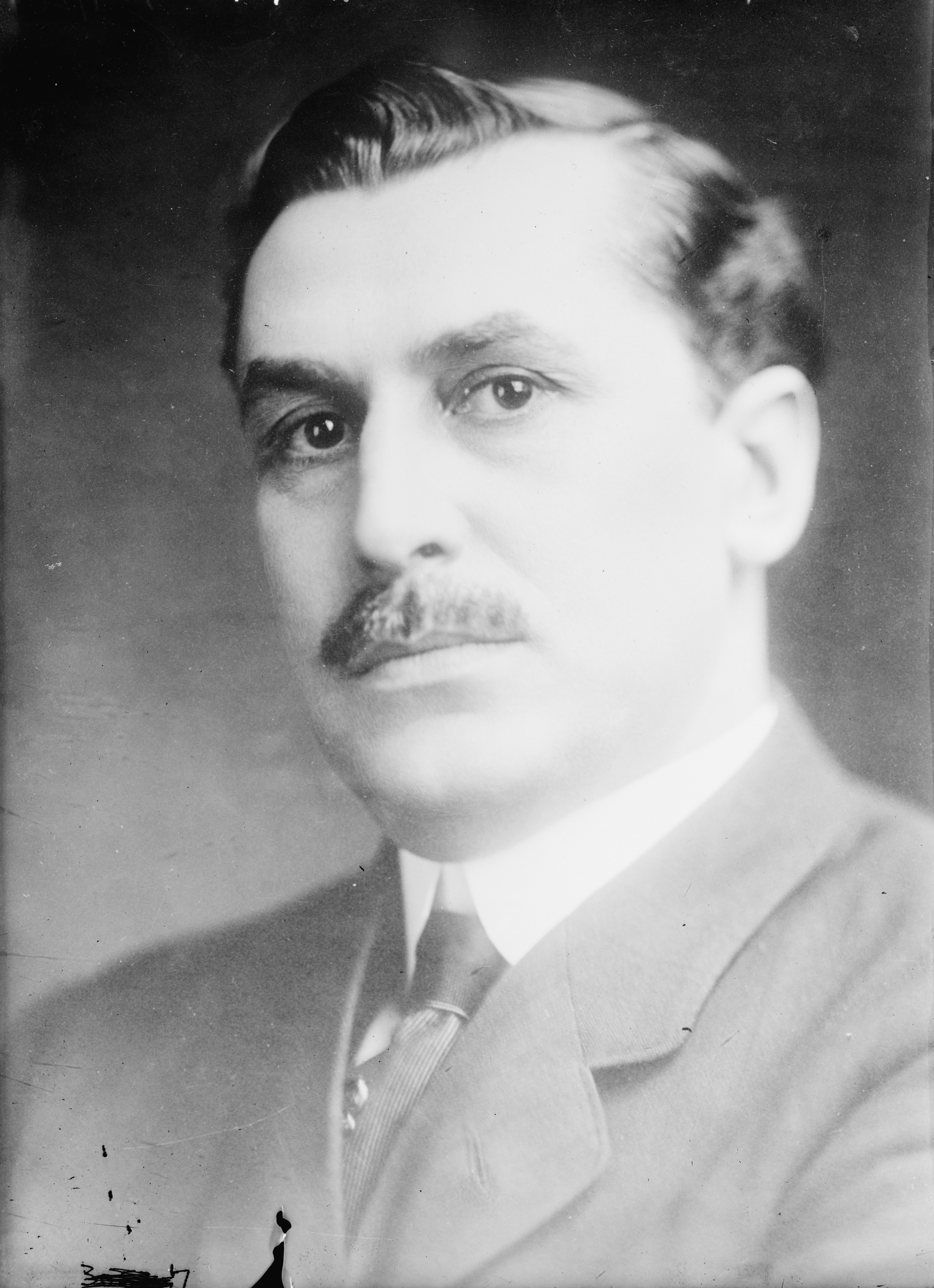
Secretary of Agriculture
Edwin T. Meredith
of Iowa

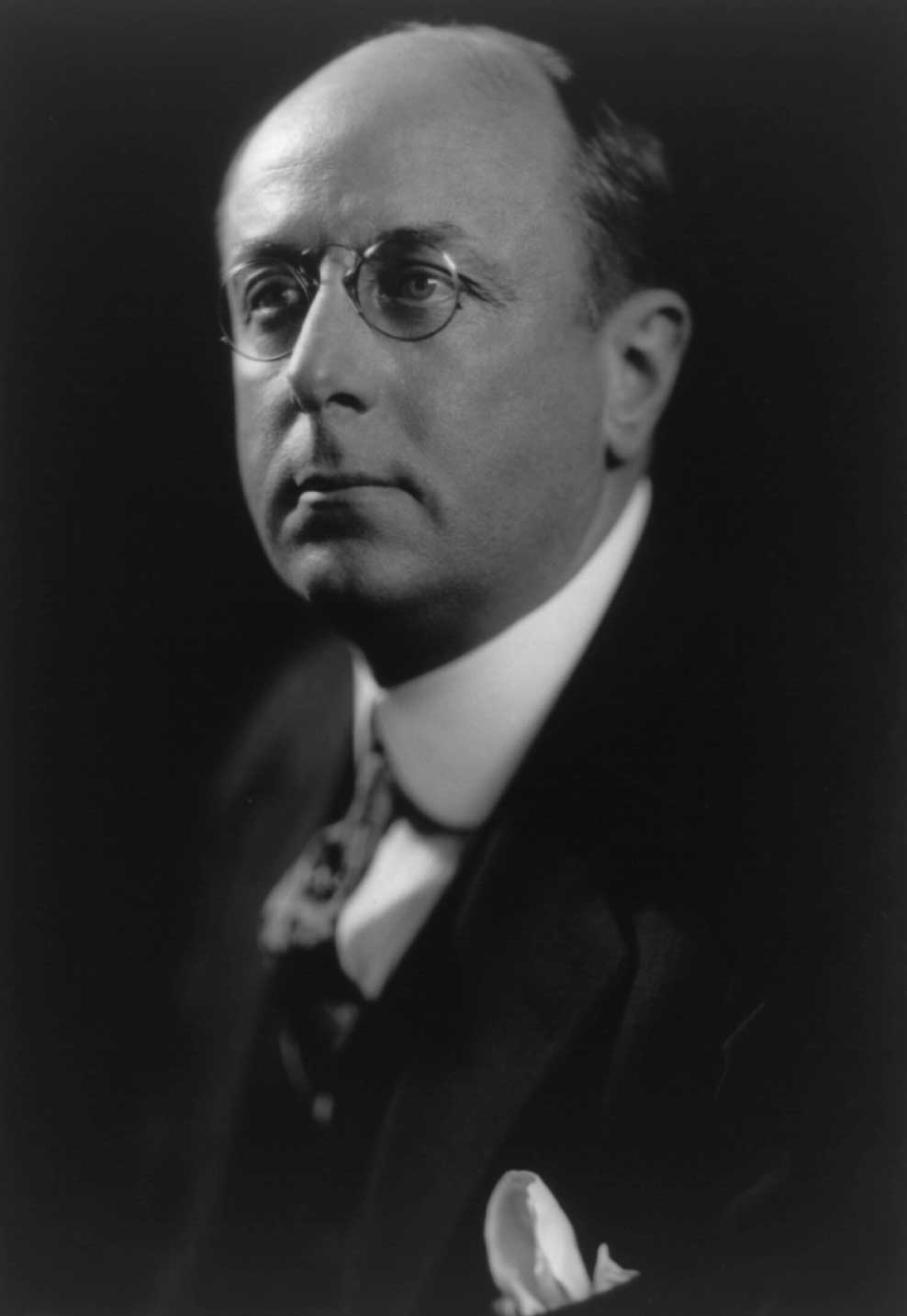
DNC Chairman
Homer S. Cummings
of Connecticut

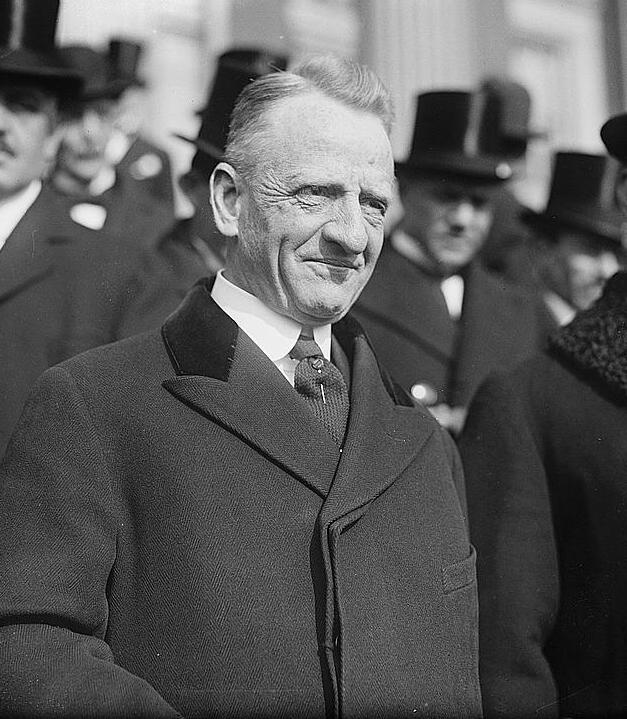
Senator
Carter Glass
of Virginia

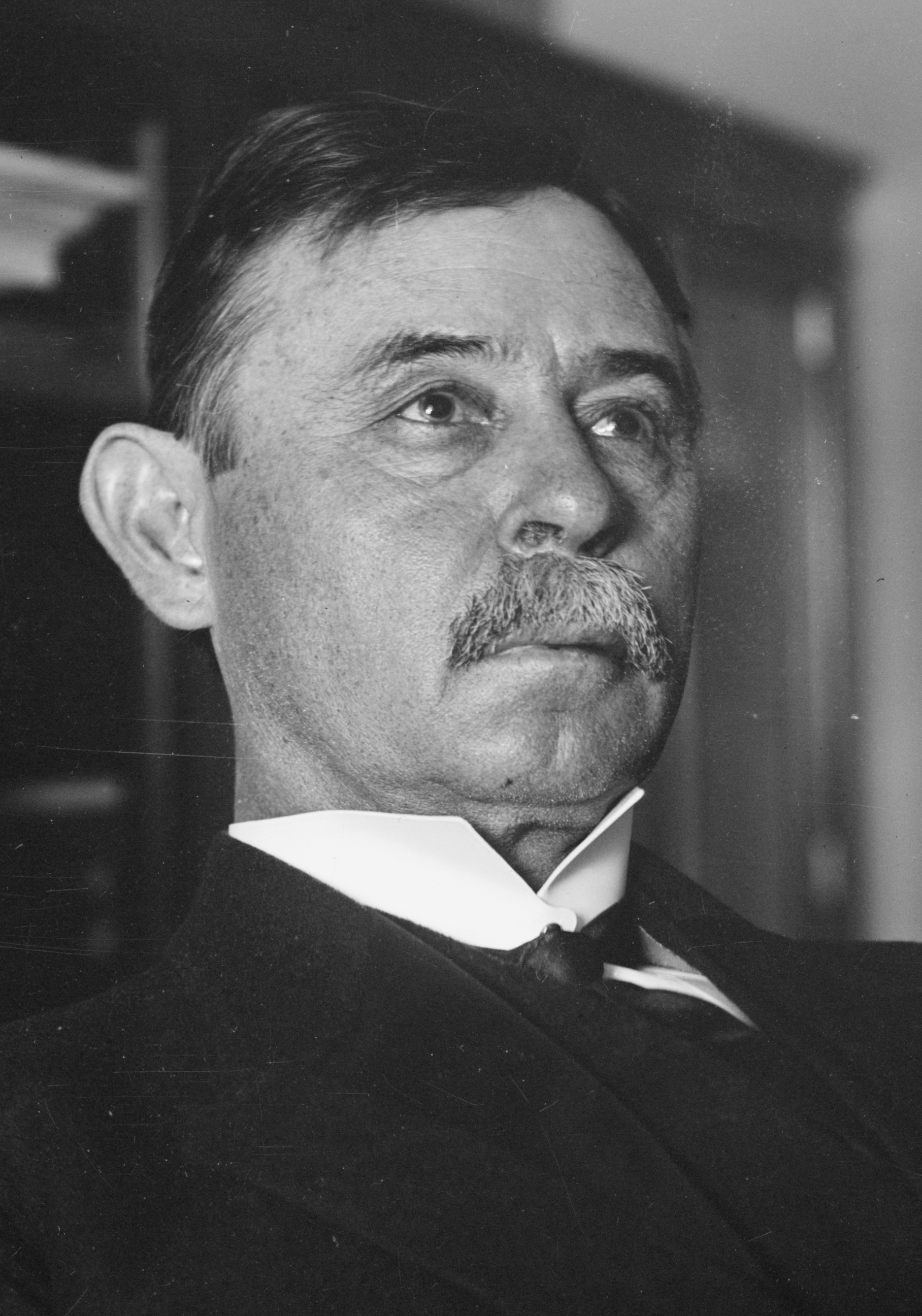
Senator
Furnifold M. Simmons
of North Carolina

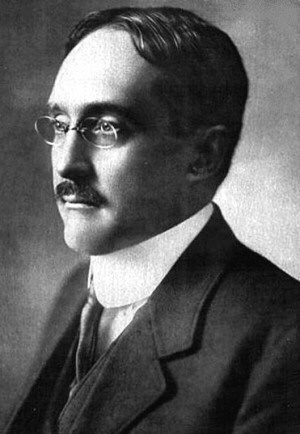
Former Ambassador
James W. Gerard
of New York

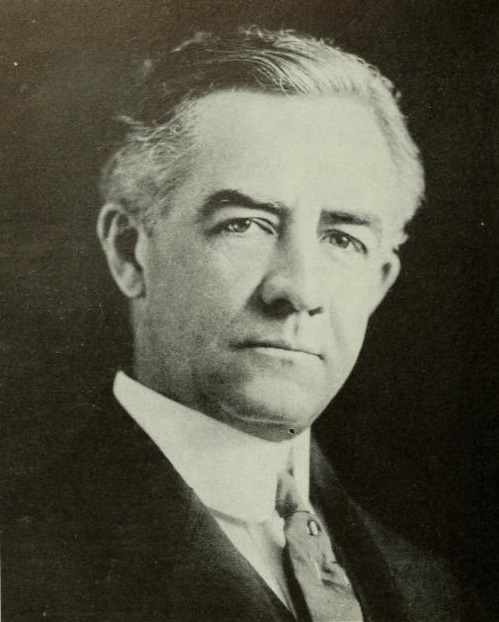
Senator
Gilbert Hitchcock
of Nebraska

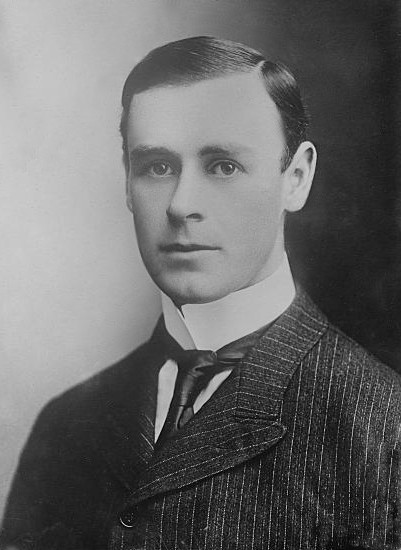
Governor-General
Francis Burton Harrison
of the Philippines

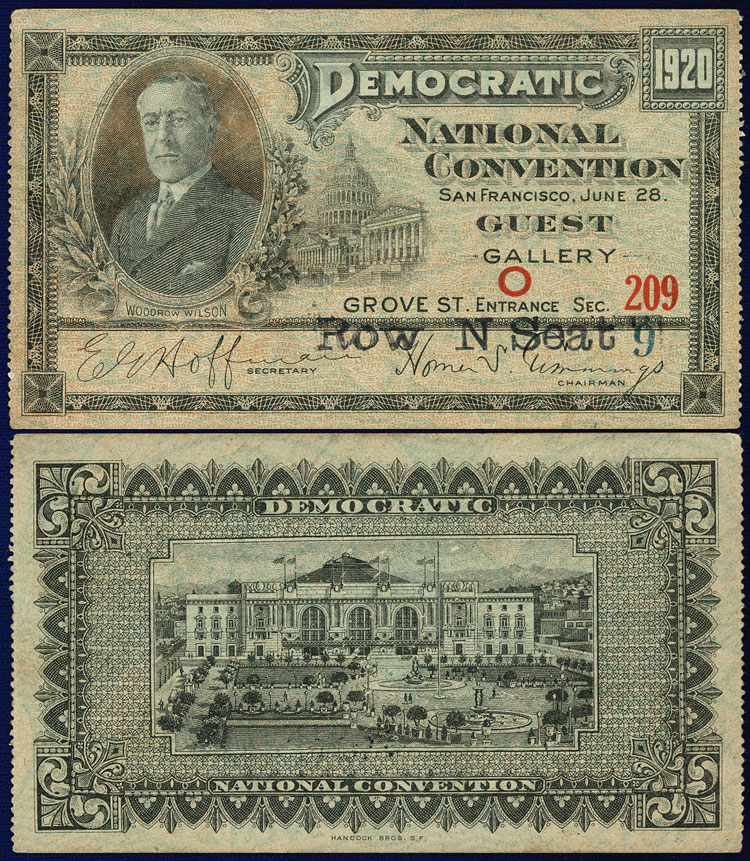
A guest ticket purchased for June 28 of the Democratic National Convention in San Francisco.

Although William Gibbs McAdoo (Wilson's son-in-law and former Treasury Secretary) was the strongest candidate, Wilson blocked his nomination in hopes a deadlocked convention would demand that he run for a third term, even though he was seriously ill, physically immobile, and in seclusion at the time. The Democrats instead nominated Ohio Governor James M. Cox as their presidential candidate and 38-year-old Assistant Secretary of the Navy Franklin D. Roosevelt, a fifth cousin of the late president Theodore Roosevelt, for vice-president.

Fourteen names were placed in nomination. Early favorites for the nomination had included McAdoo and Attorney General Alexander Mitchell Palmer. Others placed in nomination included New York Governor Al Smith, United Kingdom Ambassador John W. Davis, New Jersey Governor Edward I. Edwards, and Oklahoma Senator Robert Latham Owen.

History was made at the convention when Laura Clay, a delegate from Kentucky and co-founder of the Kentucky Equal Rights Association and the Democratic Women's Club of Kentucky, became the first woman to have her name placed into nomination for president at the convention of a major political party. She was also the first woman to receive a convention delegation's vote for the presidency.

== Balloting ==
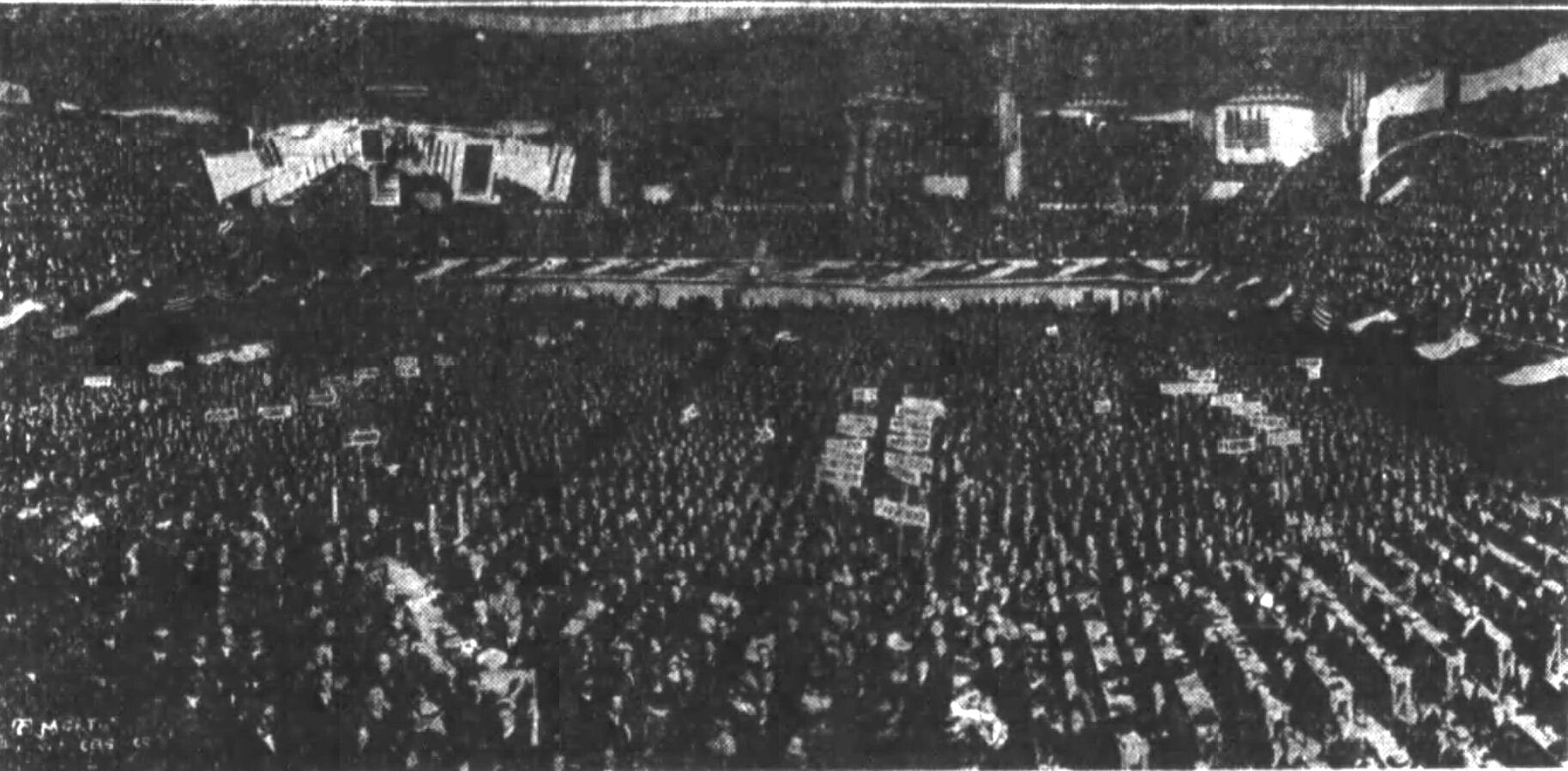
Convention hall during the convention

(1–22)	Presidential Ballot																					
	1st	2nd	3rd	4th	5th	6th	7th	8th	9th	10th	11th	12th	13th	14th	15th	16th	17th	18th	19th	20th	21st	22nd
Cox	134	159	177	178	181	195	295.5	315	321.5	321	332	404	428.5	443.5	468.5	454.5	442	458	468	456.5	426.5	430
McAdoo	266	289	323.5	335	357	368.5	384	380	386	385	380	375.5	363.5	355.5	344.5	337	332	330.5	327.5	340.5	395.5	372.5
Palmer	256	264	251.5	254	244	265	267	262	257	257	255	201	193.5	181	167	164.5	176	174.5	179.5	178	144	166.5
Al Smith	109	101	92	96	95	98	4	2	1	0	0	0	0	0	0	0	0	0	0	0	0	0
E. Edwards	42	34	32.5	31	31	30	2	0	0	0	0	0	0	0	0	0	0	0	0	0	0	0
T. Marshall	37	36	36	34	29	13	14	12	7	7	7	7	7	7	0	0	0	0	0	0	0	0
Owen	33	29	22	32	34	36	35	36	37	37	35	34	32	34	31	34	36	38	37	41	36	35
J.W. Davis	32	31.5	28.5	31	29	29	33	32	32	34	33	31.5	29.5	33	32	52	57	42	31	36	54	52
Meredith	27	26	26	28	27	0	0	0	0	0	0	0	0	0	0	0	0	0	0	0	0	0
Glass	26.5	25.5	27	27	27	27	27	27	25	25	25	25	25	25	25	25	27	26	26	26	26	25
Cummings	25	27	26	24	21	20	19	18	18	19	19	8	7	7	19	20	19	19	19	10	7	6
Simmons	24	25	0	0	0	0	0	0	0	0	0	0	0	0	0	0	0	0	0	0	0	0
Gerard	21	12	11	2	0	0	0	1	1	2	1	1	0	0	0	0	0	0	1	1	0	0
J. Williams	20	0	0	0	0	0	0	0	0	0	0	0	0	0	0	0	0	0	0	0	0	0
Hitchcock	18	16	16	5	5	0	0	0	0	0	0	0	0	0	0	0	0	0	0	0	0	0
Clark	9	6	7	8	9	7	8	6	5	4	4	4	4	4	4	4	2	2	2	2	2	2
Harrison	6	6	6	0	0	0	0	0	0	0	0	0	0	0	0	0	0	0	0	0	0	0
Wood	4	0	0	0	0	0	0	0	0	0	0	0	0	0	0	0	0	0	0	0	0	0
W.J. Bryan	1	1	0	1	0	0	0	0	0	0	0	0	0	0	0	0	0	0	0	0	0	0
Colby	1	0	0	0	2	1	0	0	0	0	0	0	0	0	0	0	0	0	0	0	0	0
Daniels	1	1	1	0	0	0	0	0	0	0	0	0	0	0	0	0	0	0	0	0	0	0
W.R. Hearst	1	0	0	0	0	0	0	0	0	0	0	0	0	0	0	0	0	0	0	0	0	0
Underwood	0.5	0	0	0	0	0	0	0	0	0	0	0	0	0	0	0	0	0	0	0	0	0
Wilson	0	0	0	0	0	0	0	0	0	0	0	0	0	0	0	0	0	0	0	0	0	2

(23–44)	Presidential Ballot																					
	23rd	24th	25th	26th	27th	28th	29th	30th	31st	32nd	33rd	34th	35th	36th	37th	38th	39th	40th	41st	42nd	43rd	44th
Cox	425	429	424	424.5	423.5	423	404.5	400.5	391.5	391	380.5	379.5	376.5	377	386	383.5	468.5	490	497.5	540.5	568	699.5
McAdoo	364.5	364.5	364.5	371	371.5	368.5	394.5	403.5	415.5	421	421	420.5	409	399	405	405.5	440	467	460	427	412	270
Palmer	181.5	177	169	167	166.5	165.5	166	165	174	176	180	184	222	241	202.5	211	74	19	12	8	7	1
J.W. Davis	50.5	54.5	58.5	55.5	60.5	62.5	63	58	57.5	55.5	56	54	33	28	50.5	50	71.5	76	55.5	49.5	57.5	52
Owen	34	33	34	33	34	35.5	33	33	34	34	34	37	38.5	36	33	33	32	33	35	34	34	34
Glass	25	25	25	25	25	24	24	24	12.5	9.5	13	7.5	5	4	1	1	0	0	24	24	5.5	1.5
Cummings	5	5	4	3	3	4	4	4	3	3	3	3	3	3	3	4	2	2	2	3	2	0
Clark	2	2	2	3	2	2	2	2	2	2	2.5	2.5	2	2	2	3	2	2	2	2	2	0
Adams	0	0	0	0	0	0	0	0	0	0	0	0	0	0	1	0	0	0	0	0	0	0
Bonniwell	0	0	0	1	0	0	0	0	0	0	0	0	0	0	1	0	0	0	0	0	0	0
W.J. Bryan	0	0	0	1	0	0	0	0	0	0	0	0	0	0	0	0	0	0	0	0	0	0
Clay	0	0	0	0	0	0	0	0	0	0	1	0	0	0	0	0	0	0	0	0	0	0
Cobb	1.5	0	0	0	0	0	0	0	0	0	0	0	0	0	0	0	0	0	0	0	0	0
Colby	0	0	0	0	0	0	0	0	0	0	0	0	0	0	0	0	1	1	1	1	1	1
Daniels	0	0	0	0	0	0	0	0	1	0	0	0	0	0	0	0	0	0	0	0	0	0
Hines	0	0	0	0	0	1	0	0	0	0	0	0	0	0	0	0	0	0	0	0	0	0
A. Jones	0	0	0	1	0	0	0	0	0	0	0	0	0	0	0	0	0	0	0	0	0	0
Lardner	0.5	0	0	0	0	0	0	0	0	0	0	0	0	0	0	0	0	0	0	0	0	0
Lewis	0	0	0	1	0	0	0	0	0	0	0	0	0	0	6	0	0	0	0	0	0	0
T. Marshall	0	0	0	0	1	0	0	0	1	0	0	0	0	0	0	0	0	0	0	0	0	0
Pershing	0	0	1	0	0	0	0	0	0	0	0	0	0	0	0	0	0	0	0	0	0	0
Robinson	0	0	0	0	1	0	0	0	0	0	0	0	0	0	0	0	0	0	0	0	0	0
Stewart	0	0	0	0	0	0	0	0	0	0	0	0	0	1	0	0	0	0	0	0	0	0
Underwood	0	1	9	9	4	6	1	2	0	0	0	0	0	0	0	0	0	0	0	0	0	0

== Vice Presidential nomination ==
Cox asked the delegates to support former Assistant Navy Secretary Franklin D. Roosevelt, because, as some thought, he had a "magic name." FDR was nominated by voice vote and received the nomination by acclamation. After it became clear that Roosevelt was the choice of party leaders, former Ambassador David R. Francis of Missouri, Major General Lawrence Tyson of Tennessee, Governor Sam V. Stewart of Montana, former Governor James H. Hawley of Idaho, former FTC Chairman Joseph E. Davies of Wisconsin, William T. Vaughan of Oregon, and oil tycoon Edward L. Doheny of California all withdrew their candidacies.

== See also ==
- History of the United States Democratic Party
- Democratic Party presidential primaries, 1920
- List of Democratic National Conventions
- U.S. presidential nomination convention
- 1920 Republican National Convention
- 1920 United States presidential election

Preceded by 1916; St. Louis, Missouri	Democratic National Conventions	Succeeded by 1924; New York, New York
