= Davis v. Alexander =

- Supreme Court of the United States

Argued October 12, 1925 Decided November 16, 1925
- Full case name: Davis v. Alexander
- Citations: 269 U.S. 114 (more) 46 S. Ct. 34; 70 L. Ed. 186; 1925 U.S. LEXIS 781

Case history
- Prior: 93 Okla. 159, 220 P. 358 (1923); cert. granted, 265 U.S. 577 (1924).

Court membership
- Chief Justice William H. Taft Associate Justices Oliver W. Holmes Jr. · Willis Van Devanter; James C. McReynolds · Louis Brandeis; George Sutherland · Pierce Butler; Edward T. Sanford · Harlan F. Stone

Case opinion
- Majority: Brandeis, joined by unanimous

Davis v Alexander, 269 U.S. 114 (1925), is a US corporate law case, concerning the duties of parent corporations for actions of subsidiaries.

== Facts ==
The case arose from a suit seeking damages for cattle negligently injured while being transported from New Mexico to Oklahoma City over the Chicago, Rock Island and Pacific Railroad. Because the claim arose while the railroad was under federal control as a result of World War I, plaintiffs were required by the Esch-Cummins Act to bring suit against a presidentially-appointed agent, James C. Davis.

While the plaintiffs brought their suit in Oklahoma state court, the injuries occurred across multiple states, and over lines operated by different railroad subsidiaries. Defendants argued that because Davis was sued in his capacity as agent for the Chicago, Rock Island and Pacific, he should not be liable for claims against the railroad's Texas subsidiary, the Chicago, Rock Island and Gulf.

Ruling in favor of the plaintiff's, the Oklahoma Supreme Court held that, because the railroads were under operation by the federal government as a single national system, Davis could be sued as agent for the entire nationalized system, not merely as agent for the railroad's Pacific lines.

== Judgment ==
In a unanimous decision, the Court affirmed the Oklahoma Supreme Court's ruling in favor of the plaintiffs, despite finding the lower court's reasoning "unsound" in light of the Court's ruling in Davis v. Donovan, 265 U. S. 257. In Donovan, the Court held that the federal Director General of Railroads operated each system under federal control as a separate entity; when named in court for claims against one system, the Director or their agent could not answer for claims against another system.

Here, however, the Court found the plaintiffs had appropriately named Davis as a defendant, since the Chicago, Rock Island and Pacific was responsible for its subsidiary Chicago, Rock Island and Gulf. Writing for the court, Justice Brandeis stated that:

Where one railroad company actually controls another and operates both as a single system, the dominant company will be liable for injuries due to the negligence of the subsidiary company.

== See also ==
- US corporate law
