= United States Railroad Administration =

WWI-era temporary railroad nationalization program

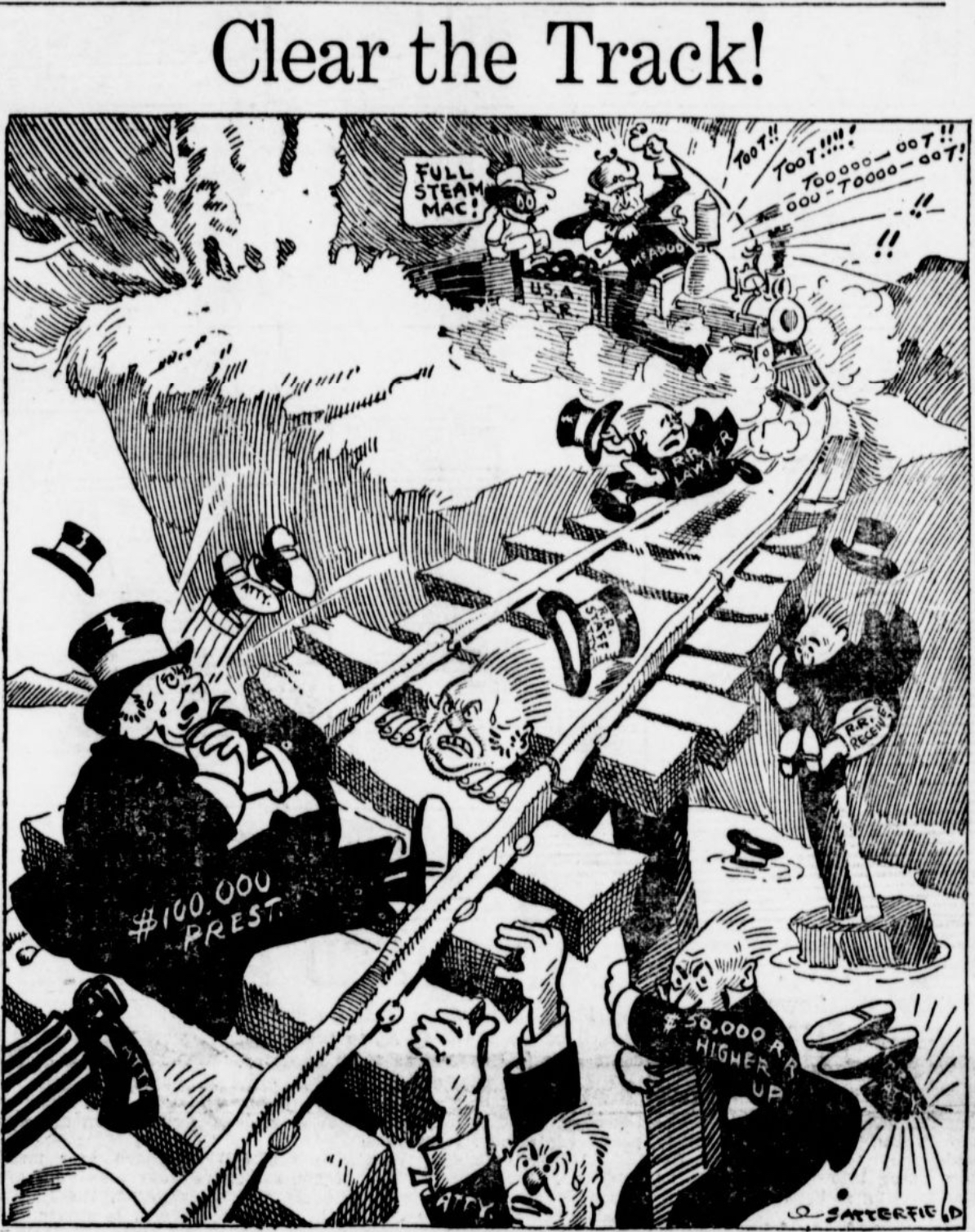
Political cartoon characterizing the startup of the USRA in 1918

The United States Railroad Administration (USRA) was the name of the nationalized railroad system of the United States between December 28, 1917, and March 1, 1920. It was the largest American experiment with nationalization, and was undertaken against a background of war emergency following American entry into World War I. During its brief existence, the USRA made major investments in the United States railroad system, and introduced standardized locomotive and railroad car classes, known as USRA standard. After the end of World War I, while some in the United States advocated for continuing nationalization, ultimately the railroads were returned to their previous owners in early 1920.

== Background ==
Although the carriers had made massive investments in the first years of the 20th century, there remained inadequacies in terminals, trackage, and rolling stock. Inflation struck the American economy, and when in 1906 Congress empowered the Interstate Commerce Commission (ICC) to set maximum shipping rates, the rail firms had difficulty securing revenue sufficient to keep pace with rising costs. The ICC did allow some increases in rates, however. Ownership of the 260,000-mile (420,000 km) United States rail network was divided among 441 distinct corporations. Investors had overexpanded the nation's trackage, so by late 1915 fully one-sixth of the railroad trackage in the country belonged to roads in receivership (bankruptcy). The national railway investment of $17.5 billion, of which more than half was funded by debt, had an estimated worth of $16 billion.

European nations engaged in World War I ordered $3 billion of munitions from United States factories; and most of this production was routed through a few Atlantic port cities. Terminal facilities in these cities were not designed to handle the resulting volume of export tonnage, though German destruction of Allied cargo ships was ultimately a bigger problem. Thousands of loaded railroad cars were delayed awaiting transfer of their contents to ships; they were essentially used as warehouses. This resulted in a shortage of railroad cars to move normal freight traffic. The United States' declaration of war on April 6, 1917, increased rail congestion by requiring movement of soldiers from induction points through training facilities to embarkation points.

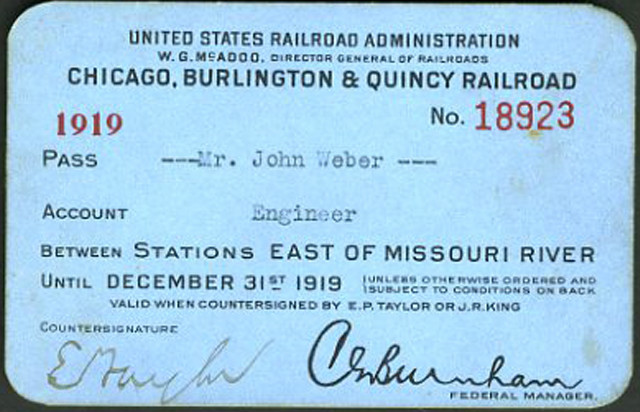
Chicago, Burlington and Quincy Railroad employee's pass issued by USRA

The railroad unions (commonly called "brotherhoods"), desiring shorter working days and better pay, threatened strike action in the second half of 1916. To avert a strike, President Woodrow Wilson secured Congressional passage of the Adamson Act, which set the eight-hour work day as the industry standard. When the Supreme Court ruled the law constitutional, the carriers had no choice but to comply.

The railroads attempted to coordinate their efforts to support the war by creating the Railroads' War Board, but private action ran into anti-trust and other regulatory barriers. Observers noted, for example, that sometimes competitive practices prevailed that were not in the best interests of efficient mobilization. Also, government departments sought priority for shipment made on their behalf, and congestion in freight yards, terminals, and port facilities became staggering.

Finally, in December 1917 the ICC recommended federal control of the railroad industry to ensure efficient operation. The takeover measures were to go beyond simply easing the congestion and expediting the flow of goods; they were to bring all parties—management, labor, investors, and shippers—together in a harmonious whole working on behalf of the national interest. President Wilson issued an order for nationalization on December 26, 1917. This action had been authorized by the Army Appropriations Act of 1916. Federal control extended over the steam and electric railroads with their owned or controlled systems of coastwise and inland water transportation, terminals, terminal companies, terminal associations, sleeping and parlor cars, private cars, private car lines, elevators, warehouses, and telephone and telegraph lines.

== Changes and new equipment ==
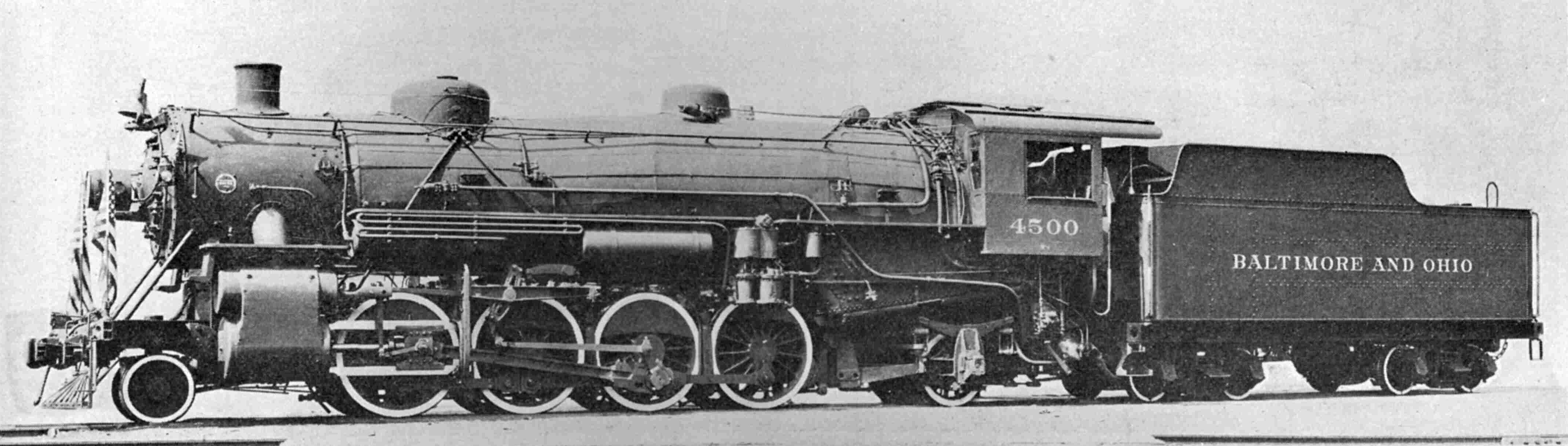
The Light Mikado was the standard light freight locomotive and the most widely built type of the USRA standard designs.

Change happened swiftly. The railroads were organized into three divisions: East, West, and South. Uniform passenger ticketing was instituted, and competing services on different former railroads were cut back. Duplicate passenger services were reduced by eliminating more than 250 trains from eastern railroad schedules to allow increased numbers of freight trains to use crowded lines. Costly and employee-heavy sleeping car services were reduced and extra fares applied to discourage their use. Giving priority to coal trains reduced shortages of locomotive fuel. Ordering all empty box cars to be sent to wheat-producing areas improved the flow of food to European allies. USRA pooled all rolling stock, terminals, port facilities, and shops to reduce congestion in Chicago and New York City. All railroad companies serving those metropolitan areas were given trackage rights over all lines entering the area and equal access to terminal facilities. Available railroad rolling stock inventory of 61,000 locomotives, 2,250,000 freight cars, and 58,000 passenger cars were augmented by new production. Over 100,000 railroad cars and 1,930 steam locomotives were ordered at a cost of $380 million, all of new USRA standard designs. The new rolling stock consisted of up-to-date and standardized types, designed to be the best that could be produced to replace outdated equipment.

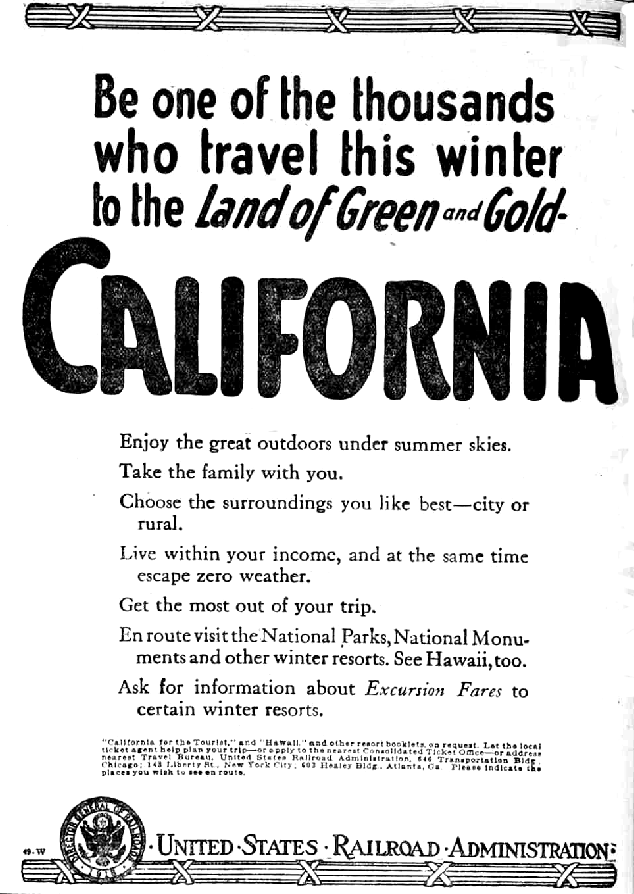
USRA ad promoting travel to California

Before the new USRA standard locomotive types were built and released, locomotives that builders had on hand were issued to various railroads. 2-8-0 "Consolidation" locomotives built by the Baldwin Locomotive Works for transport and use in France were made available. Then 2-10-0 "Decapod" locomotives built for Imperial Russia by both ALCO and Baldwin, but stranded in the US by the Russian Revolution of 1917, were also made available to the railroads. The USRA leased these locomotives.

== Progression ==
On March 21, 1918, the Railway Administration Act became law, and Wilson's 1917 nationalization order was affirmed. Wilson appointed his son-in-law, Secretary of the Treasury William Gibbs McAdoo, as Director General of the newly formed USRA.

The law guaranteed the return of the railroads to their former owners within 21 months of a peace treaty, and guaranteed that their properties would be handed back in at least as good a condition as when they were taken over. It also guaranteed compensation for the use of their assets at the average operational income of the railroads in the three years previous to nationalization. The act laid down in concrete terms that the nationalization would be only a temporary measure; before, it was not defined as necessarily so.

Both wages and rates for both passenger and freight traffic were raised by the USRA during 1918, wages being increased disproportionately for the lower-paid employees, which proved unpopular among more senior ones.

With the Armistice in November 1918, McAdoo resigned from his post, leaving Walker Hines as the Director General.

== Winding down ==
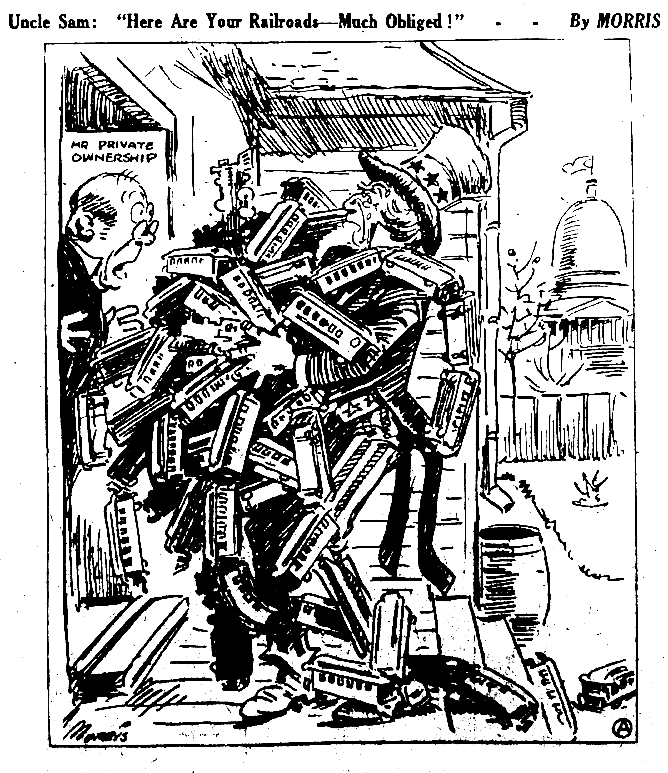
Cartoon characterizing the return of the railroads to private ownership

There was support among labor unions for continuing the nationalization of the railroads after the war. However, this position was not supported by Wilson nor the public generally. Because the United States was not a party to the Treaty of Versailles ending the war in 1919, which would have been the legal basis for returning the railroads to private ownership under the Railway Administration Act, legislation was drafted to effect the return.

Congress passed the Esch-Cummins Act (Railroad Transportation Act) in February 1920, which substantially increased the ICC's powers over the railroads, and the USRA's authority ended on March 1, 1920. The ICC was given powers to approve or reject railroad mergers, to set rates, to approve or reject abandonments of service, and additional oversight responsibilities. The government also made financial guarantees to the railroads after control was handed back to them, to ensure their financial survival after the restoration of control.

== Aftermath ==
The Esch-Cummins Act maintained and expanded a complete railroad regulatory system after the war. During the 1920s the railroads, with rates and routes set by the ICC, were facing increasing competition from other modes of transportation: trucking and airplanes. These competing modes were basically unregulated at the time, and received extensive financial assistance from the federal government. This competition contributed to the railroads' decline in the 1920s and beyond, and which was amplified in the 1930s during the Great Depression.

== Notable personnel ==
- Charles Keller, a U.S. Army Colonel, served as secretary of the USRA Committee on Inland Waterways in 1918. (He was later promoted to Brigadier General and served in World War II.)
- Charles A. Prouty, previously Chairman of the ICC, was the USRA Director of Public Service and Accounting.
- Edward Chambers, formerly Vice President of the Atchison, Topeka and Santa Fe Railway, was USRA Director of the Division of Traffic.

== See also ==
- History of rail transport in the United States
- Federal Railroad Administration - Established in 1966
- Amtrak - Quasi-public corporation established in 1971 for inter-city passenger rail service
- Conrail - Government corporation operating a freight rail service (1976-1987)
