= Walker Hines =

Walker Hines may refer to:

- Walker Hines (railroad executive)
- Walker Hines (politician)
