= List of United States Supreme Court cases, volume 269 =

Supreme Court of the United States
- Interactive map of Supreme Court of the United States
- 38°53′26″N 77°00′16″W
- Established: March 4, 1789; 236 years ago
- Location: Washington, D.C.
- Coordinates: 38°53′26″N 77°00′16″W
- Composition method: Presidential nomination with Senate confirmation
- Authorised by: Constitution of the United States, Art. III, § 1
- Judge term length: life tenure, subject to impeachment and removal
- Number of positions: 9 (by statute)
- Website: supremecourt.gov

This is a list of cases reported in volume 269 of United States Reports, decided by the Supreme Court of the United States in 1925 and 1926.

== Justices of the Supreme Court at the time of volume 269 U.S. ==
The Supreme Court is established by Article III, Section 1 of the Constitution of the United States, which says: "The judicial Power of the United States, shall be vested in one supreme Court . . .". The size of the Court is not specified; the Constitution leaves it to Congress to set the number of justices. Under the Judiciary Act of 1789 Congress originally fixed the number of justices at six (one chief justice and five associate justices). Since 1789 Congress has varied the size of the Court from six to seven, nine, ten, and back to nine justices (always including one chief justice).

When the cases in volume 269 were decided the Court comprised the following nine members:

Portrait	Justice	Office	Home State	Succeeded	Date confirmed by the Senate (Vote)	Tenure on Supreme Court
	William Howard Taft	Chief Justice	Connecticut	Edward Douglass White	June 30, 1921 (Acclamation)	July 11, 1921 – February 3, 1930 (Retired)
	Oliver Wendell Holmes Jr.	Associate Justice	Massachusetts	Horace Gray	December 4, 1902 (Acclamation)	December 8, 1902 – January 12, 1932 (Retired)
	Willis Van Devanter	Associate Justice	Wyoming	Edward Douglass White (as Associate Justice)	December 15, 1910 (Acclamation)	January 3, 1911 – June 2, 1937 (Retired)
	James Clark McReynolds	Associate Justice	Tennessee	Horace Harmon Lurton	August 29, 1914 (44–6)	October 12, 1914 – January 31, 1941 (Retired)
	Louis Brandeis	Associate Justice	Massachusetts	Joseph Rucker Lamar	June 1, 1916 (47–22)	June 5, 1916 – February 13, 1939 (Retired)
	George Sutherland	Associate Justice	Utah	John Hessin Clarke	September 5, 1922 (Acclamation)	October 2, 1922 – January 17, 1938 (Retired)
	Pierce Butler	Associate Justice	Minnesota	William R. Day	December 21, 1922 (61–8)	January 2, 1923 – November 16, 1939 (Died)
	Edward Terry Sanford	Associate Justice	Tennessee	Mahlon Pitney	January 29, 1923 (Acclamation)	February 19, 1923 – March 8, 1930 (Died)
	Harlan F. Stone	Associate Justice	New York	Joseph McKenna	February 5, 1925 (71–6)	March 2, 1925 – July 2, 1941 (Continued as chief justice)

== Citation style ==
Under the Judiciary Act of 1789 the federal court structure at the time comprised District Courts, which had general trial jurisdiction; Circuit Courts, which had mixed trial and appellate (from the US District Courts) jurisdiction; and the United States Supreme Court, which had appellate jurisdiction over the federal District and Circuit courts—and for certain issues over state courts. The Supreme Court also had limited original jurisdiction (i.e., in which cases could be filed directly with the Supreme Court without first having been heard by a lower federal or state court). There were one or more federal District Courts and/or Circuit Courts in each state, territory, or other geographical region.

The Judiciary Act of 1891 created the United States Courts of Appeals and reassigned the jurisdiction of most routine appeals from the district and circuit courts to these appellate courts. The Act created nine new courts that were originally known as the "United States Circuit Courts of Appeals." The new courts had jurisdiction over most appeals of lower court decisions. The Supreme Court could review either legal issues that a court of appeals certified or decisions of court of appeals by writ of certiorari. On January 1, 1912, the effective date of the Judicial Code of 1911, the old Circuit Courts were abolished, with their remaining trial court jurisdiction transferred to the U.S. District Courts.

Bluebook citation style is used for case names, citations, and jurisdictions.

- "# Cir." = United States Court of Appeals
  - e.g., "3d Cir." = United States Court of Appeals for the Third Circuit
- "D." = United States District Court for the District of . . .
  - e.g.,"D. Mass." = United States District Court for the District of Massachusetts
- "E." = Eastern; "M." = Middle; "N." = Northern; "S." = Southern; "W." = Western
  - e.g.,"M.D. Ala." = United States District Court for the Middle District of Alabama
- "Ct. Cl." = United States Court of Claims
- The abbreviation of a state's name alone indicates the highest appellate court in that state's judiciary at the time.
  - e.g.,"Pa." = Supreme Court of Pennsylvania
  - e.g.,"Me." = Supreme Judicial Court of Maine

== List of cases in volume 269 U.S. ==
Case Name	Page and year	Opinion of the Court	Concurring opinion(s)	Dissenting opinion(s)	Lower Court	Disposition
Patterson v. Louisville and Nashville Railroad Company	1 (1925)	Brandeis	none	none	5th Cir.	affirmed
United States ex rel. Kennedy v. Tyler	13 (1925)	Sutherland	none	none	W.D.N.Y.	affirmed
Agnello v. United States	20 (1925)	Butler	none	none	2d Cir.	multiple
Druggan v. Anderson	36 (1925)	Holmes	none	none	N.D. Ill.	affirmed
American Railway Express Company v. Daniel	40 (1925)	Holmes	none	none	Ga.	reversed
Buckeye Coal and Railway Company v. Hocking Valley Railway Company	42 (1925)	Taft	none	none	S.D. Ohio	affirmed
Donegan v. Dyson	49 (1925)	Taft	none	none	S.D. Fla.	affirmed
Old Dominion Land Company v. United States	55 (1925)	Holmes	none	none	4th Cir.	affirmed
Western Union Telegraph Company v. Georgia	67 (1925)	Holmes	none	none	Ga.	dismissed
Hicks v. Guinness	71 (1925)	Holmes	none	none	2d Cir.	multiple
Enrique del Pozo y Marcos v. Wilson Cypress Company	82 (1925)	VanDevanter	none	none	5th Cir.	affirmed
Lipshitz and Cohen v. United States	90 (1925)	McReynolds	none	none	N.D. Ga.	affirmed
Margolin v. United States	93 (1925)	McReynolds	none	none	2d Cir.	affirmed
Woerishoffer v. United States	102 (1925)	Brandeis	none	none	Ct. Cl.	affirmed
Burk-Waggoner Oil Association v. Hopkins	110 (1925)	Brandeis	none	none	N.D. Tex.	affirmed
Davis v. Alexander	114 (1925)	Brandeis	none	none	Okla.	affirmed
Hicks v. Poe	118 (1925)	Brandeis	none	none	4th Cir.	affirmed
Freshman v. Atkins	121 (1925)	Sutherland	none	none	5th Cir.	affirmed
Gulf Refining Company v. United States	125 (1925)	Sutherland	none	none	5th Cir.	multiple
Anderson v. Clune	140 (1925)	Sutherland	none	none	9th Cir.	certification
Stilz v. United States	144 (1925)	Butler	none	none	Ct. Cl.	affirmed
Kansas City Structural Steel Company v. Arkansas ex rel. Ashley County	148 (1925)	Butler	none	none	Ark.	affirmed
Arkansas v. Tennessee	152 (1925)	Butler	none	none	original	boundary set
Davis v. John L. Roper Lumber Company	158 (1925)	Butler	none	none	Va.	reversed
Stephenson v. Kirtley	163 (1925)	Sanford	none	none	S.D.W. Va.	affirmed
Beazell v. Ohio	167 (1925)	Stone	none	none	Ohio	affirmed
Arkansas ex rel. Utley v. St. Louis–San Francisco Railway Company	172 (1925)	Stone	none	none	Ark.	dismissed
Concrete Appliances Company v. Gomery	177 (1925)	Stone	none	none	3d Cir.	affirmed
Southern Electric Company v. Stoddard	186 (1925)	Taft	none	none	N.Y. Sup. Ct.	dismissed
Central Union Telephone Company v. City of Edwardsville	190 (1925)	Taft	none	none	Ill.	dismissed
United States v. Boston Insurance Company	197 (1925)	McReynolds	none	none	Ct. Cl.	reversed
Edwards v. Douglas	204 (1925)	Brandeis	none	none	2d Cir.	reversed
Louisville and Nashville Railroad Company v. Sloss-Sheffield Steel and Iron Company	217 (1925)	Brandeis	none	McReynolds; Stone	5th Cir.	affirmed
New York ex rel. Woodhaven Gas Light Company v. Public Service Commission of New York	244 (1925)	Butler	none	none	N.Y. Sup. Ct.	affirmed
Work v. Louisiana	250 (1925)	Sanford	none	none	D.C. Cir.	affirmed
Matthews v. Huwe	262 (1925)	Taft	none	none	Ohio Dist. Ct. App.	dismissed
Atchison, Topeka and Santa Fe Railway Company v. United States	266 (1925)	Holmes	none	none	7th Cir.	reversed
Pacific American Fisheries v. Alaska	269 (1925)	Holmes	none	none	9th Cir.	affirmed
Henderson Water Company v. Corporation Commission of North Carolina	278 (1925)	Taft	none	none	E.D.N.C.	affirmed
White v. Mechanics Securities Corporation	283 (1925)	Holmes	none	none	multiple	affirmed
Ex parte Gruber	302 (1925)	Sutherland	none	none	original	mandamus denied
United States v. New York and Cuba Mail Steamship Company	304 (1925)	Sanford	none	none	2d Cir.	reversed
United States v. Robbins	315 (1926)	Holmes	none	none	N.D. Cal.	reversed
New Jersey v. Sargent	328 (1926)	VanDevanter	none	none	original	dismissed
First National Bank of Guthrie Center v. Anderson	341 (1926)	VanDevanter	none	none	Iowa	reversed
Live Oak Water Users' Association v. Railroad Commission of California	354 (1926)	McReynolds	none	none	Cal.	dismissed
United States v. Daugherty	360 (1926)	McReynolds	none	none	8th Cir.	reversed
O'Hara v. Luckenbach Steamship Company	364 (1926)	Sutherland	none	none	9th Cir.	reversed
American Steel Foundries v. Robertson	372 (1926)	Sutherland	none	none	7th Cir.	certification
Connally v. General Construction Company	385 (1926)	Sutherland	none	none	W.D. Okla.	affirmed
Browning v. Hooper	396 (1926)	Butler	none	none	N.D. Tex.	reversed
Minneapolis, St. Paul and Sault Ste. Marie Railroad Company v. Goneau	406 (1926)	Sanford	none	none	Minn.	affirmed
United States v. River Rouge Improvement Company	411 (1926)	Sanford	none	none	6th Cir.	reversed
United States v. Anderson	422 (1926)	Stone	none	none	Ct. Cl.	reversed
Provost v. United States	443 (1926)	Stone	none	none	Ct. Cl.	affirmed
Independent Wireless Telegraph Company v. Radio Corporation of America	459 (1926)	Taft	none	none	2d Cir.	affirmed
Trusler v. Crooks	475 (1926)	McReynolds	none	none	W.D. Mo.	reversed
Bramwell v. United States Fidelity and Guaranty Company	483 (1926)	Butler	none	none	9th Cir.	affirmed
Price v. United States	492 (1926)	Butler	none	none	2d Cir.	affirmed
Stripe v. United States	503 (1926)	Butler	none	none	2d Cir.	affirmed
United States v. Butterworth-Judson Corporation	504 (1926)	Butler	none	none	2d Cir.	reversed
Metcalf and Eddy v. Mitchell	514 (1926)	Stone	none	none	D. Mass.	multiple
