= William Gibbs McAdoo =

American lawyer and statesman (1863–1941)

William McAdoo
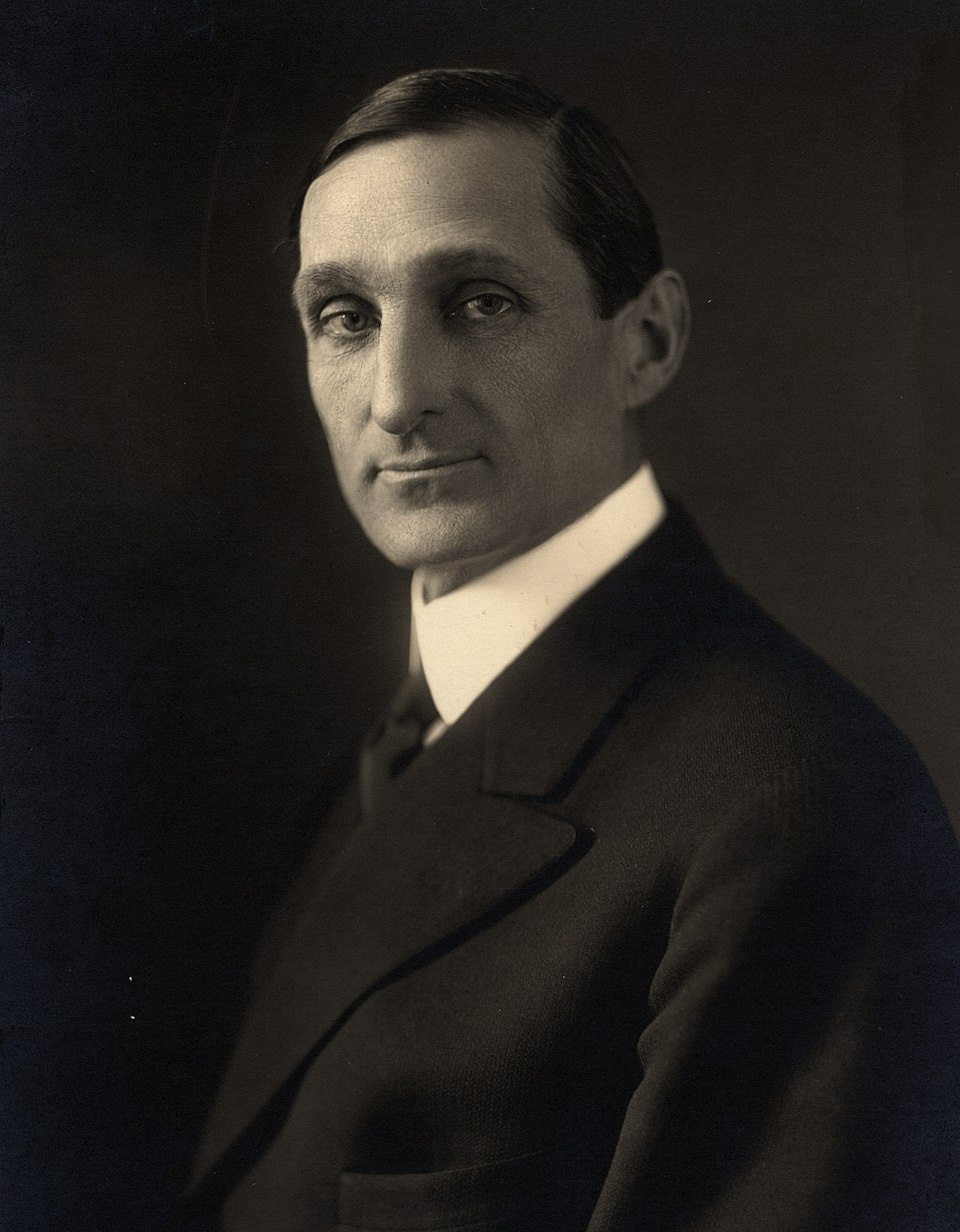
- Portrait by Harris & Ewing, 1914

United States Senator from California
- In office March 4, 1933 – November 8, 1938
- Preceded by: Samuel M. Shortridge
- Succeeded by: Thomas M. Storke

46th United States Secretary of the Treasury
- In office March 6, 1913 – December 15, 1918
- President: Woodrow Wilson
- Preceded by: Franklin MacVeagh
- Succeeded by: Carter Glass

Director General of Railroads
- In office December 28, 1917 – November 18, 1918
- President: Woodrow Wilson
- Preceded by: Position established
- Succeeded by: Walker Hines

Personal details
- Born: William Gibbs McAdoo Jr. October 31, 1863 Marietta, Georgia, Confederate States
- Died: February 1, 1941 (aged 77) Washington, D.C., U.S.
- Resting place: Arlington National Cemetery
- Party: Democratic
- Spouses: Sarah Hazelhurst Fleming (m. 1885; died 1912); Eleanor Randolph Wilson (m. 1914; div. 1935); Doris Cross (m. 1935)
- Children: 9
- Education: University of Tennessee, Knoxville (BA)
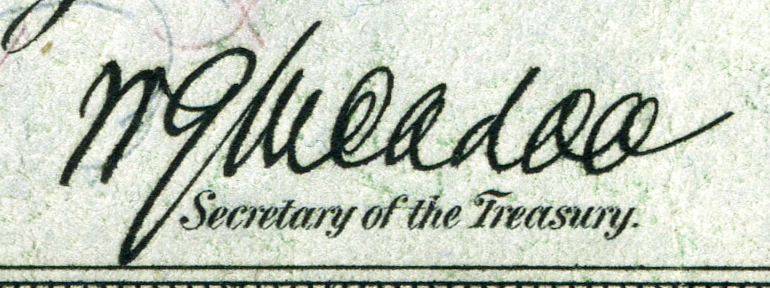
- Signature
- McAdoo's voice Gibbs describing government plans to reduce taxes following World War I. Recorded December 1, 1919

William Gibbs McAdoo Jr. /ˈmækəˌduː/ (October 31, 1863 – February 1, 1941) was an American lawyer and statesman. McAdoo was a leader of the Progressive movement and played a major role in the administration of his father-in-law, President Woodrow Wilson. A member of the Democratic Party, he also represented California in the United States Senate.

Born in Marietta, Georgia, McAdoo moved to Knoxville, Tennessee, in his youth and graduated from the University of Tennessee. He established a legal practice in Chattanooga, Tennessee, before moving to New York City in 1892. He gained fame as the president of the Hudson and Manhattan Railroad Company and served as the vice chairman of the Democratic National Committee. McAdoo worked on Wilson's successful 1912 presidential campaign and served as the United States Secretary of the Treasury from 1913 to 1918. He married Wilson's daughter, Eleanor, in 1914. McAdoo presided over the establishment of the Federal Reserve System and helped prevent an economic crisis after the outbreak of World War I. After the U.S. entered the war, McAdoo also served as the Director General of Railroads. McAdoo left Wilson's Cabinet in 1919, co-founding the law firm of McAdoo, Cotton & Franklin.

McAdoo sought the Democratic presidential nomination at the 1920 Democratic National Convention but was opposed by his father-in-law, President Woodrow Wilson, who hoped to be nominated for a third term. In 1922, McAdoo left his law firm and moved to California. He sought the Democratic presidential nomination again in 1924, but the 1924 Democratic National Convention nominated John W. Davis. He was elected to the Senate in 1932 but was defeated in his bid for a second term. McAdoo died of a heart attack in 1941 while traveling from the third inauguration of Franklin D. Roosevelt.

Throughout the course of his political career, McAdoo supported numerous progressive causes such as decent living wage standards for workers, aid to farmers, and social insurance.

== Early life and career ==
McAdoo was born during the middle of the Civil War in the historic William Gibbs McAdoo House in Marietta, Georgia. He was the son of author Mary Faith Floyd (1832–1913) and attorney William Gibbs McAdoo (1820–1894). His uncle, John David McAdoo, was a Confederate general and a justice of the Texas Supreme Court. McAdoo attended rural schools until his family moved to Knoxville, Tennessee, in 1877, when his father became a professor at the University of Tennessee.

He graduated from the University of Tennessee and was a member of the Lambda chapter of Kappa Sigma fraternity. He was appointed deputy clerk of the United States District Court for the Eastern District of Tennessee in 1882. He married his first wife, Sarah Hazelhurst Fleming, on November 18, 1885. They had seven children: Harriet Floyd McAdoo, Francis Huger McAdoo, Julia Hazelhurst McAdoo, Nona Hazelhurst McAdoo, William Gibbs McAdoo III, Robert Hazelhurst McAdoo, and Sarah Fleming McAdoo.

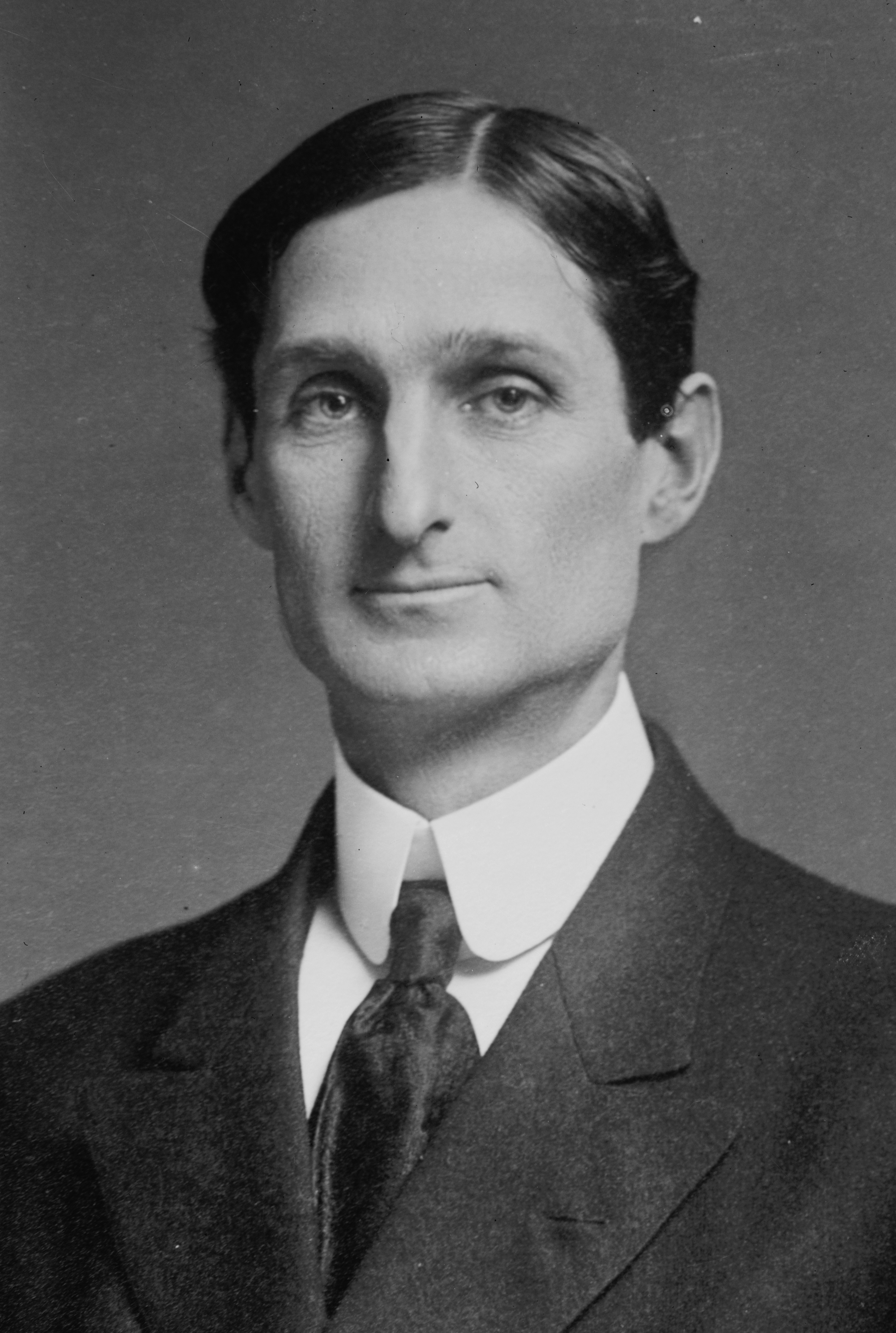
McAdoo in his youth

He was admitted to the bar in Tennessee in 1885 and set up a practice in Chattanooga, Tennessee. In the early 1890s, he lost most of his money trying to electrify the Knoxville Street Railroad system. In 1892 he moved to New York City, where he met Francis R. Pemberton, son of the Confederate General John C. Pemberton. They formed a firm, Pemberton and McAdoo, to sell investment securities.

In 1895, McAdoo returned to Knoxville and regained control of part of his bankrupt streetcar company, which had been auctioned off. In subsequent months, he engaged in a struggle with Ohio businessman C.C. Howell over control of the city's streetcar system, culminating in a bizarre incident known as the Battle of Depot Street. Litigation in the aftermath of this incident favored Howell, and McAdoo abandoned his streetcar endeavors in 1897 and returned to New York.

Around 1900, McAdoo took on the leadership of a project to build the Uptown Hudson Tubes, a pair of railroad tunnels under the Hudson River connecting Manhattan with New Jersey. A tunnel had been partially constructed during the 1880s by Dewitt Clinton Haskin. With McAdoo as president of the Hudson and Manhattan Railroad Company, two passenger tubes were completed and opened in 1908. The popular McAdoo told the press that his motto was "Let the Public be Pleased." The tunnels are now part of the PATH train system. As part of publicizing the tunnels, McAdoo gave tours to political leaders and foreign dignitaries. He met Woodrow Wilson in 1910, near the end of Wilson's tenure as the president of Princeton University. McAdoo campaigned for Wilson when Wilson ran for governor of New Jersey later that year. He went on to serve as vice chair of the Democratic National Committee and co-chair of Wilson's successful 1912 presidential campaign. McAdoo's wife died in February 1912.

== Secretary of the Treasury ==
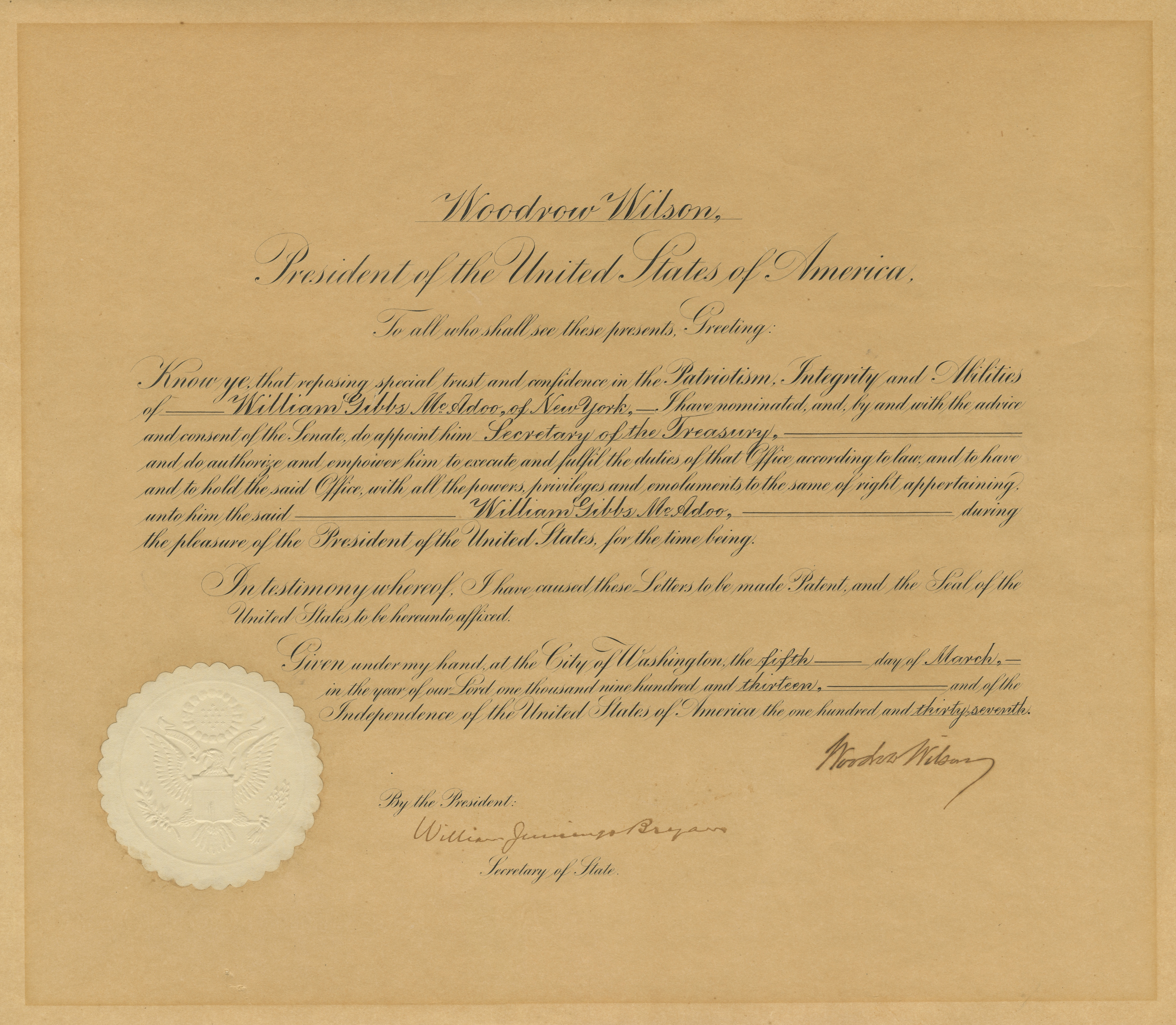
President Woodrow Wilson's commission of Treasury Secretary McAdoo, March 1913

After taking office as president, Wilson appointed McAdoo secretary of the Treasury, a post McAdoo held from 1913 to 1918.

He married the president's daughter Eleanor Randolph Wilson at the White House on May 7, 1914. They had two daughters, Ellen Wilson McAdoo (1915–1946) and Mary Faith McAdoo (1920–1988). Ellen married twice and had two children. Mary married three times, but had no children. McAdoo's second marriage ended in divorce in July 1935, and he married a third time at nearly 72, to 26 year old nurse Doris Isabel Cross (1909–2005), in September 1935.

McAdoo offered to resign after his wedding, but President Wilson urged him to complete his work of turning the Federal Reserve System into an operational central bank. The legislation establishing the System had been passed by Congress in December 1913.

As head of the Department of the Treasury, McAdoo confronted a major financial crisis on the eve and at the outbreak of World War I, in July and August 1914. At the time, the United States was still a net debtor nation (i.e., Americans' aggregate debt to foreigners was greater than foreigners' aggregate debt to Americans). The nations of Europe and their financial institutions held far more in debt of the United States, of many of the states of the Union, and of American private institutions of all kinds; than investors in the United States held in the debt of Europe's nations and institutions in all forms, both public and private. During the last week of July 1914, British and French investors began to liquidate their American securities holdings into U.S. currency. Many of these foreign investors then converted their dollars into gold, as was common practice in international monetary transactions at the time, in order to repatriate their holdings back to Europe. If continued, these actions would have depleted the gold backing for the dollar, possibly inducing a depression in American financial markets and in the American economy as a whole. Investors might then have been able to buy American goods and raw materials (for their war effort) at greatly depressed prices, which Americans would have had to accept in order to restart the economy from a consciously (albeit inadvertently) caused depression.

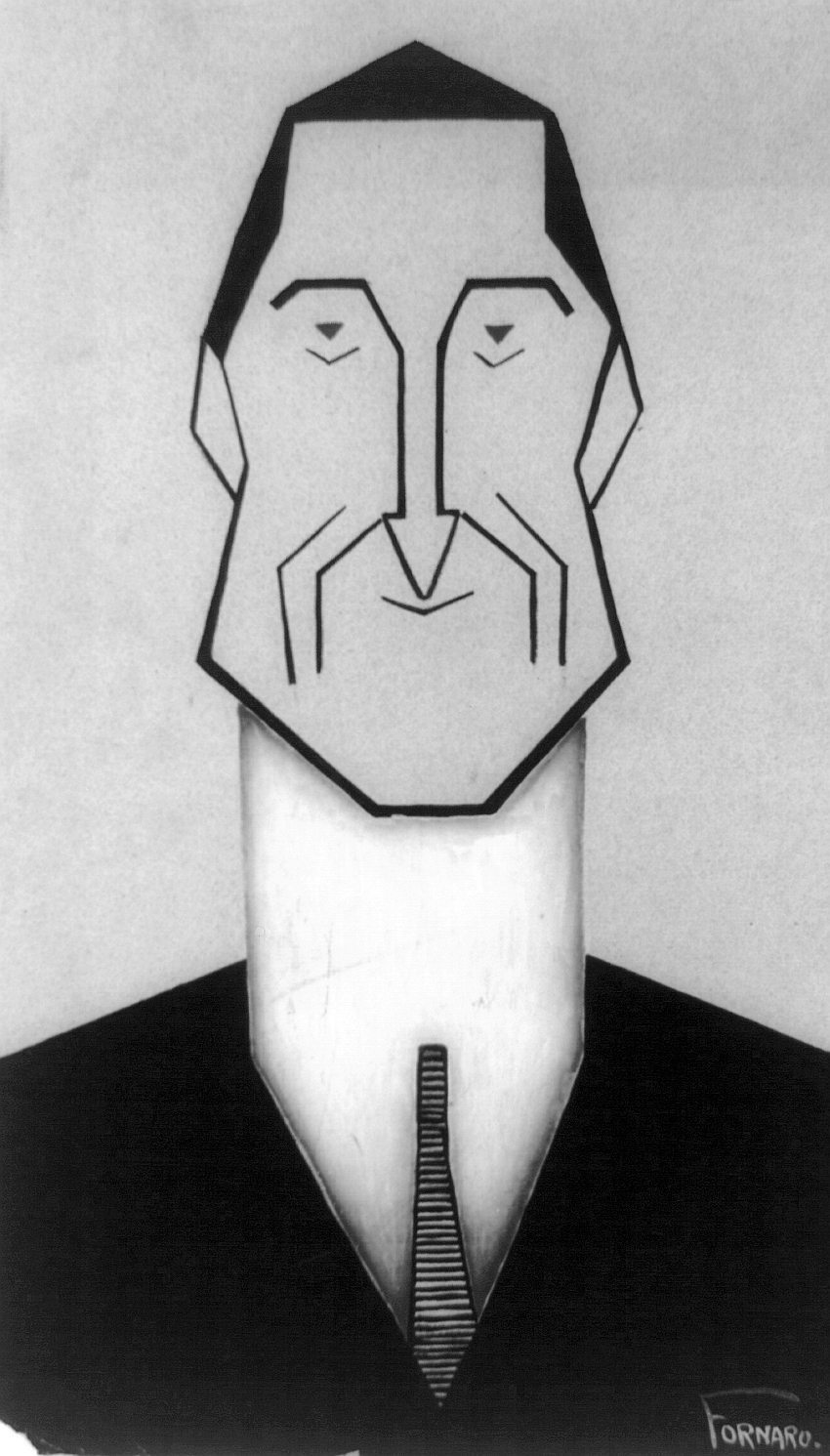
"A long man with a long head". Puck cartoon, 25 April 1914.

McAdoo's actions, then, were both bold and outrageous: keeping the U.S. currency on the gold standard, he arranged the closing of the New York Stock Exchange for an unprecedented four months to prevent Europeans from selling American securities and exchanging the proceeds for dollars and gold.

Investors in the warring countries thus had no access to their holdings of U.S. financial assets at the outset of the war. As a result, the treasuries of those countries more quickly exhausted all of their net foreign exchange holdings (those that were on hand and in their possession before McAdoo closed the markets), currency, and gold reserves. Some of them then issued sovereign bonded indebtedness (IOUs) to pay for the war materials they were buying on the American and other markets.

Economist William L. Silber wrote that the wisdom and historical impact of this action cannot be overemphasized. McAdoo's bold stroke, Silber writes, averted an immediate panic and collapse of the American financial and stock markets. It also laid the groundwork for a historic and decisive shift in the global balance of economic power, from Europe to the United States; a shift which occurred exactly at that time. More than this, McAdoo's actions both saved the American economy and its future allies from economic defeat in the early stages of the war.

Silber wrote that the intact and undamaged American financial system and its markets managed the flow and operation of this financing more easily than they would have without McAdoo's measures, and that U.S. industry swiftly built up to the scale needed to meet the allied war needs. The managed liquidation of foreign holdings of U.S. assets moved the United States to a net creditor position internationally and with Europe from the net debtor position it had held prior to 1915.

In order to prevent a replay of the bank suspensions that plagued America during the Panic of 1907, McAdoo also invoked the emergency-currency provisions of the 1908 Aldrich–Vreeland Act. Silber credits his actions for having turned America into a world financial power, in his book When Washington Shut Down Wall Street.

Like President Wilson, McAdoo was a segregationist. During his tenure as Secretary, he broke with long-standing policy and ordered implementation of Jim Crow in all Treasury facilities, even in the north where they had previously not existed. McAdoo told reporter Oswald Garrison Villard that racial segregation was needed in the Treasury to prevent friction.

== Later political career ==
After the United States entered World War I in April 1917, the United States Railroad Administration was formed to run America's transportation system during the war. McAdoo was appointed Director General of Railroads, a position he held until the armistice in November 1918.

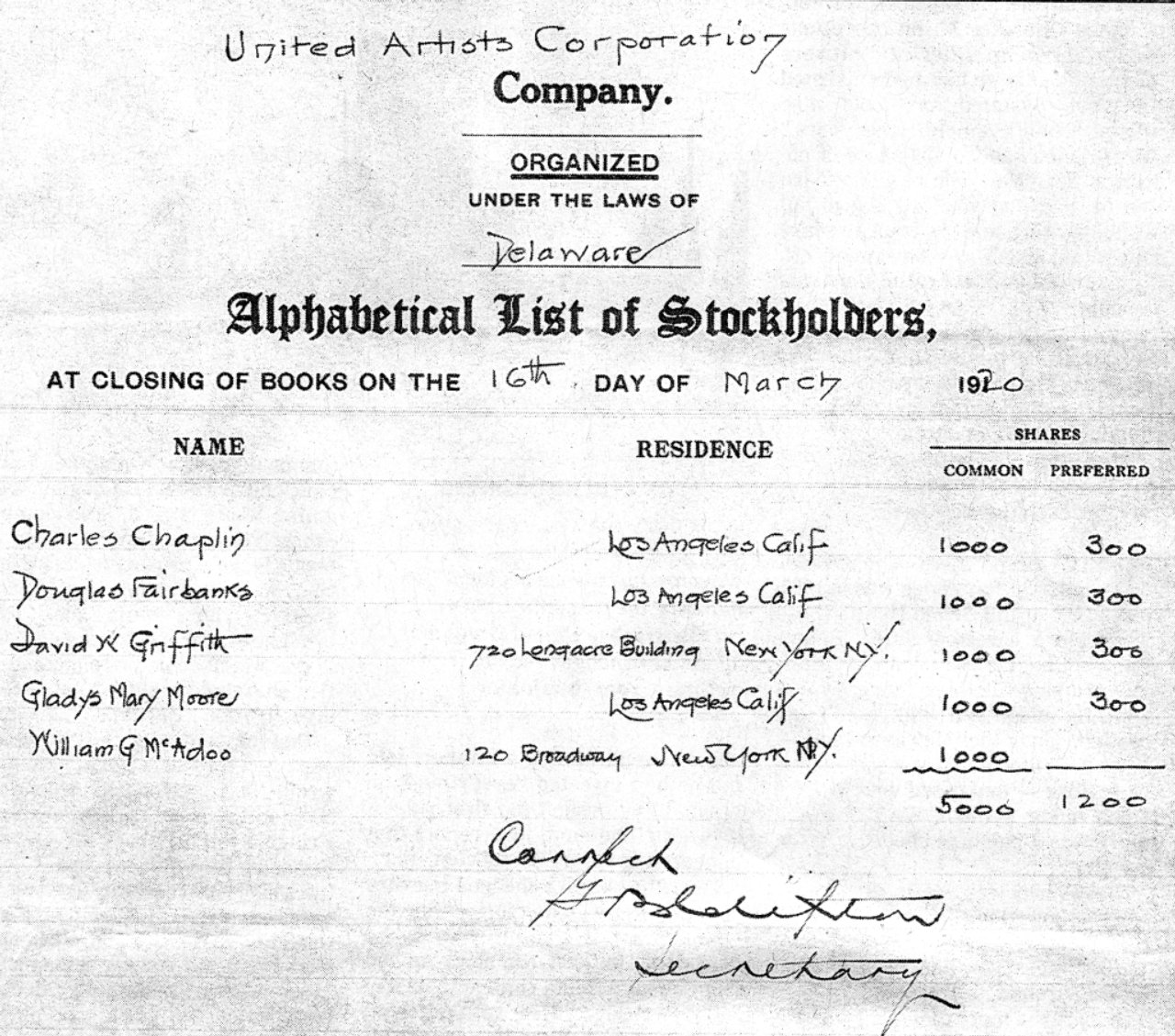
List of UA stockholders in 1920

In March 1919, after leaving the Wilson cabinet, McAdoo co-founded the law firm McAdoo, Cotton & Franklin, now known as white shoe firm Cahill Gordon & Reindel. His law firm served as general counsel for the founders of United Artists, with McAdoo taking a 20 percent stake in the common shares of the joint venture, while founders Mary Pickford, Charlie Chaplin, Douglas Fairbanks and D. W. Griffith each held a 25 percent stake in the preferred shares and a 20 percent stake of the common shares. He left the firm in 1922 and moved to California to concentrate on his political career.

=== 1920 and 1924 campaigns for President ===
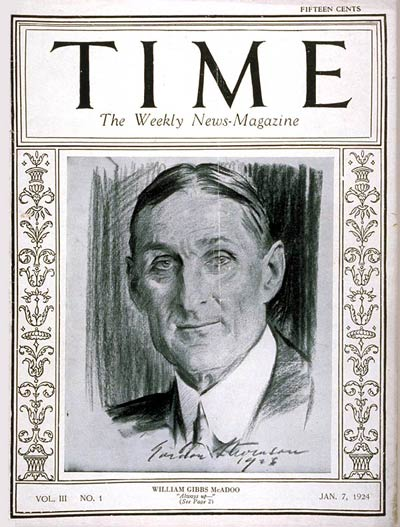
Time cover, January 7, 1924

McAdoo ran twice for the Democratic nomination for president, losing to James M. Cox in 1920, and to John W. Davis in 1924, even though in both years he led on the first ballot. While campaigning in the run-up to the 1920 presidential election, McAdoo voiced his support for such measures as injury compensation, unemployment insurance, and the eight-hour workday, while also expressing his support for the idea of permanent federal legislation in the labor sphere, especially concerning unemployment compensation and a minimum wage.

A committed Prohibition supporter, McAdoo's first presidential bid was scuttled by the New York state delegation and other Northern opponents of the banning of alcohol at the 1920 Democratic National Convention. After defeating his chief rival for the nomination, Attorney General A. Mitchell Palmer, McAdoo finally lost the party nomination to dark horse candidate Governor James M. Cox of Ohio when the delegates decided in his favor on the 44th ballot.

McAdoo was again a candidate for the Democratic presidential nomination in 1924. Widely regarded as the front-runner in 1923, McAdoo's candidacy was badly hurt by the revelation that he had previously accepted a $25,000 contribution from Edward L. Doheny, an oil tycoon implicated in 1922 in the Teapot Dome scandal. McAdoo had returned the normal-course contribution once he learned of Doheny's possible bribes to Secretary of the Interior Albert Fall to get oil leases. At the 1924 Democratic National Convention, McAdoo received the support of the friends of the Ku Klux Klan. He refused to repudiate the KKK causing the Catholic vote to turn against him. McAdoo defeated Oscar Underwood, who was an opponent of the Ku Klux Klan and Prohibition, in the Georgia primary and split the Alabama delegation. McAdoo led after the first ballot of the convention, with his greatest challenger being New York Governor Al Smith. After dozens of ballots, and numerous brawls between McAdoo's and Smith's supporters, compromise candidate John W. Davis won the nomination on the 103rd ballot.

=== 1923 Los Angeles Bus System Proposal ===
In February 1923, McAdoo and a consortium of eastern investors attempted to establish the first city bus service in Los Angeles. The Peoples' Motor Bus Company was to cover 60 miles of Los Angeles streets with double-decker buses. The scheme was defeated by a public referendum in favor of a competing proposal by the Pacific Electric Railway and Los Angeles Railway.

=== Senator from California: 1933–1938 ===
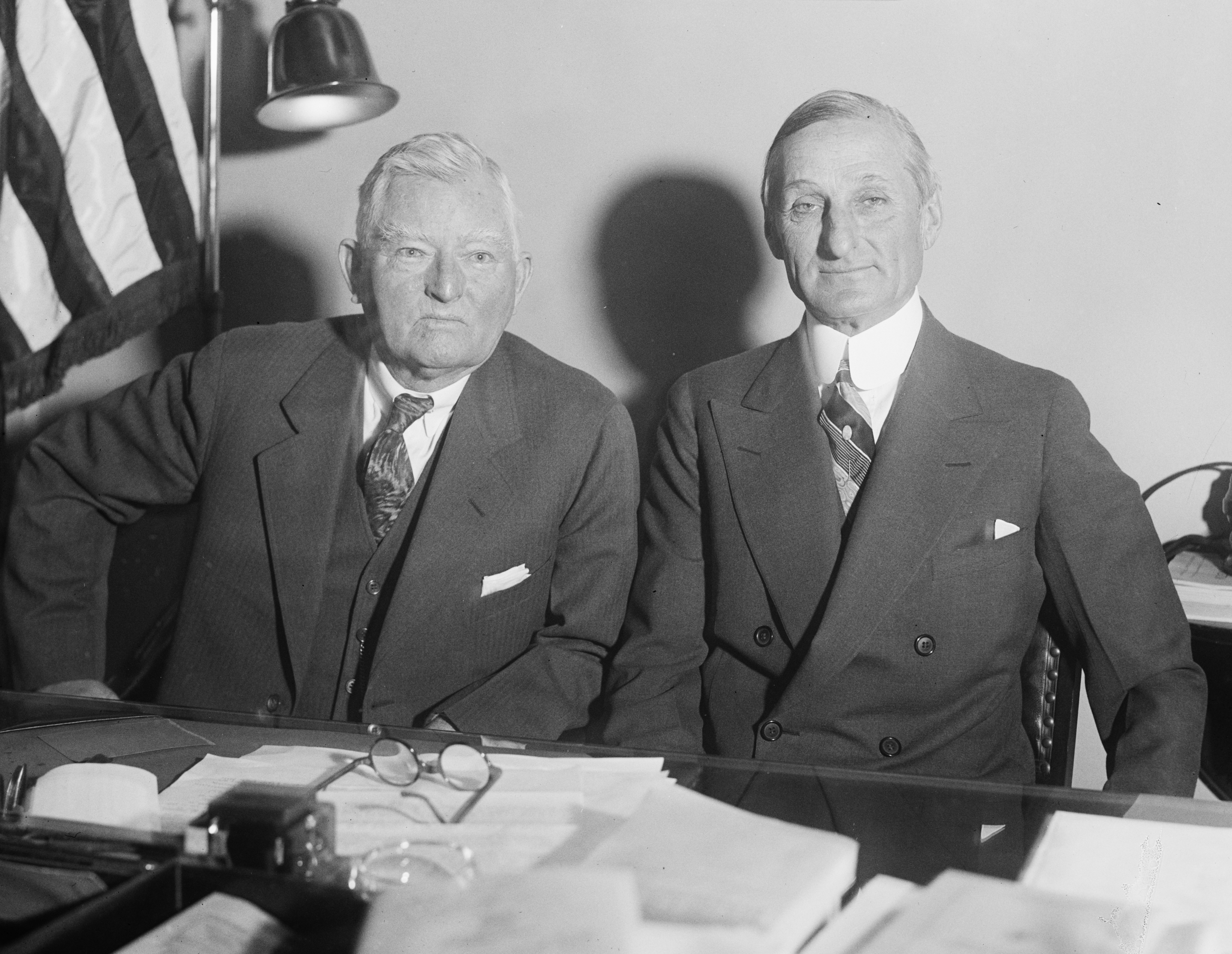
McAdoo with John Nance Garner, 1932

From 1932 to 1940, McAdoo served as a member of the Democratic National Committee. At the 1932 Democratic National Convention, he played an important role in switching California's support from presidential candidate John Nance Garner to Franklin D. Roosevelt, which aided Roosevelt in obtaining the nomination. In 1932, he was the successful Democratic nominee for a seat in the United States Senate. He won the Senate seat in a three-way race with 43% of the vote; Republican Tallant Tubbs won 31%, and Prohibitionist "Fighting Bob" Shuler won 26%. He served from 1933 until November 1938; after losing renomination to Sheridan Downey, he resigned a few weeks before the completion of his term. In the Senate, McAdoo was one of the authors of the 1933 Banking Act. He also served as chairman of the Committee on Patents from 1934 to 1938. He voted to invoke cloture on the Anti-Lynching Bill of 1937, but the bill failed to receive enough votes for cloture to override a filibuster by Southern Democrats. In 1937, McAdoo introduced a successful bill that enabled the federal government to purchase a large timber holding from the Yosemite Lumber Company and bring it within the boundaries of Yosemite National Park.

McAdoo's wife filed for divorce in 1934. Two months after their decree was finalized in July 1935, the 71-year-old McAdoo married Doris Isabel Cross, a 26-year-old nurse.

== Death ==
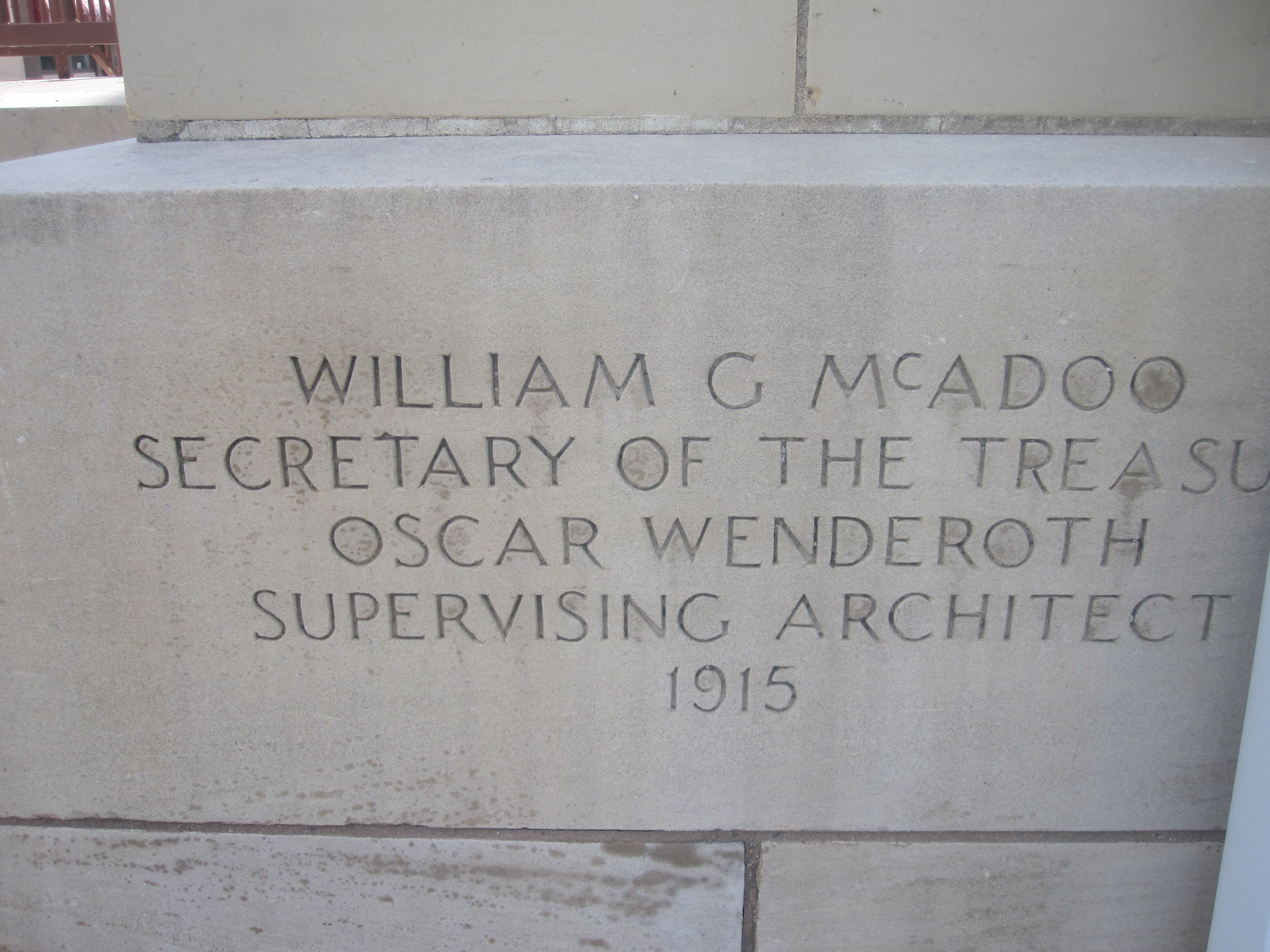
As treasury secretary, McAdoo's name is on the cornerstone of the U.S. Post Office (built 1919) in La Junta, Colorado.

McAdoo died on February 1, 1941, of a heart attack while traveling in Washington, D.C., after the third inauguration of Franklin D. Roosevelt, and was buried in Arlington National Cemetery in Virginia.

== Legacy ==
He excelled first as a maverick promoter and businessman who supported antitrust measures that were favored by the progressive movement. The World War enormously enlarged his scope of Treasury Department activities, giving him a strong voice in all major foreign and domestic policies, with major impact on the entire economy.

In the 1920s, as his Democratic Party polarized, he took the side of rural America, especially the South, as opposed to Al Smith's big cities. He never supported the Ku Klux Klan, but on the other hand refused to denounce it when so many loyal Democrats belonged. McAdoo and Smith stalemated each other in the fierce competition for the 1924 presidential nomination.

In 1932, he helped stop Al Smith and instead promoted Franklin Roosevelt for the nomination. He supported the New Deal, but he was no longer comfortable with the growing radicalism in California in the mid-1930s, and was defeated for reelection in 1938.

McAdoo was played by Vincent Price in the 1944 biopic Wilson. He is a significant character in the Glen David Gold novel Sunnyside, encouraging Charlie Chaplin to help with efforts to raise funds for World War I before advising him on the formation of United Artists. McAdoo's former home in Chattanooga's Fort Wood neighborhood has been restored and is now a private residence.

The town of McAdoo in Dickens County, Texas, is named for him. McAdoo's Seafood Company, a restaurant in New Braunfels, Texas, also bears his name.

McAdoo is quoted as having said, "It is impossible to defeat an ignorant man in an argument." And in reference to Warren Harding, McAdoo said his public utterances were "an army of pompous phrases moving over the landscape in search of an idea."

== Selected works ==
- The Challenge: Liquor and Lawlessness Versus Constitutional Government. New York: Century. 1928. LCCN 28011726.
- Crowded Years: The Reminiscences of William G. McAdoo. Boston: Houghton Mifflin. 1931. LCCN 31032318.

== See also ==
- List of railroad executives

== Footnotes ==
Political offices
Preceded by Franklin MacVeagh	United States Secretary of the Treasury; 1913–1918	Succeeded by Carter Glass
Awards and achievements
Preceded by Anthony Fokker	Cover of Time; 7 January 1924	Succeeded by William Lawrence
Party political offices
Preceded by John Elliott	Democratic nominee for U.S. Senator from California (Class 3); 1932	Succeeded by Sheridan Downey
U.S. Senate
Preceded by Samuel M. Shortridge	U.S. Senator (Class 3) from California; 1933–1938; Served alongside: Hiram Johnson	Succeeded by Thomas M. Storke
