= Fort Wood Historic District =

Historic district in Tennessee, United States

- U.S. National Register of Historic Places
- U.S. Historic district
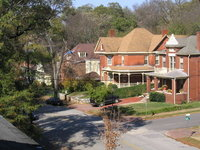
- Fort Wood District looking down Oak Street

- Location within Tennessee Location within the United States
- Location: Roughly bounded by Palmetto, McCallie, E. 4th and O'Neal Streets; Chattanooga, Tennessee
- Coordinates: 35.0448°N 85.2920°W
- NRHP reference No.: 79002437
- Added to NRHP: April 18, 1979

Fort Wood Historic District is a historic neighborhood in Chattanooga, Tennessee. It is bounded roughly by Palmetto Street, McCallie Avenue, East 4th Street, and O'Neal Street, just east of the campus of the University of Tennessee at Chattanooga.

== History ==
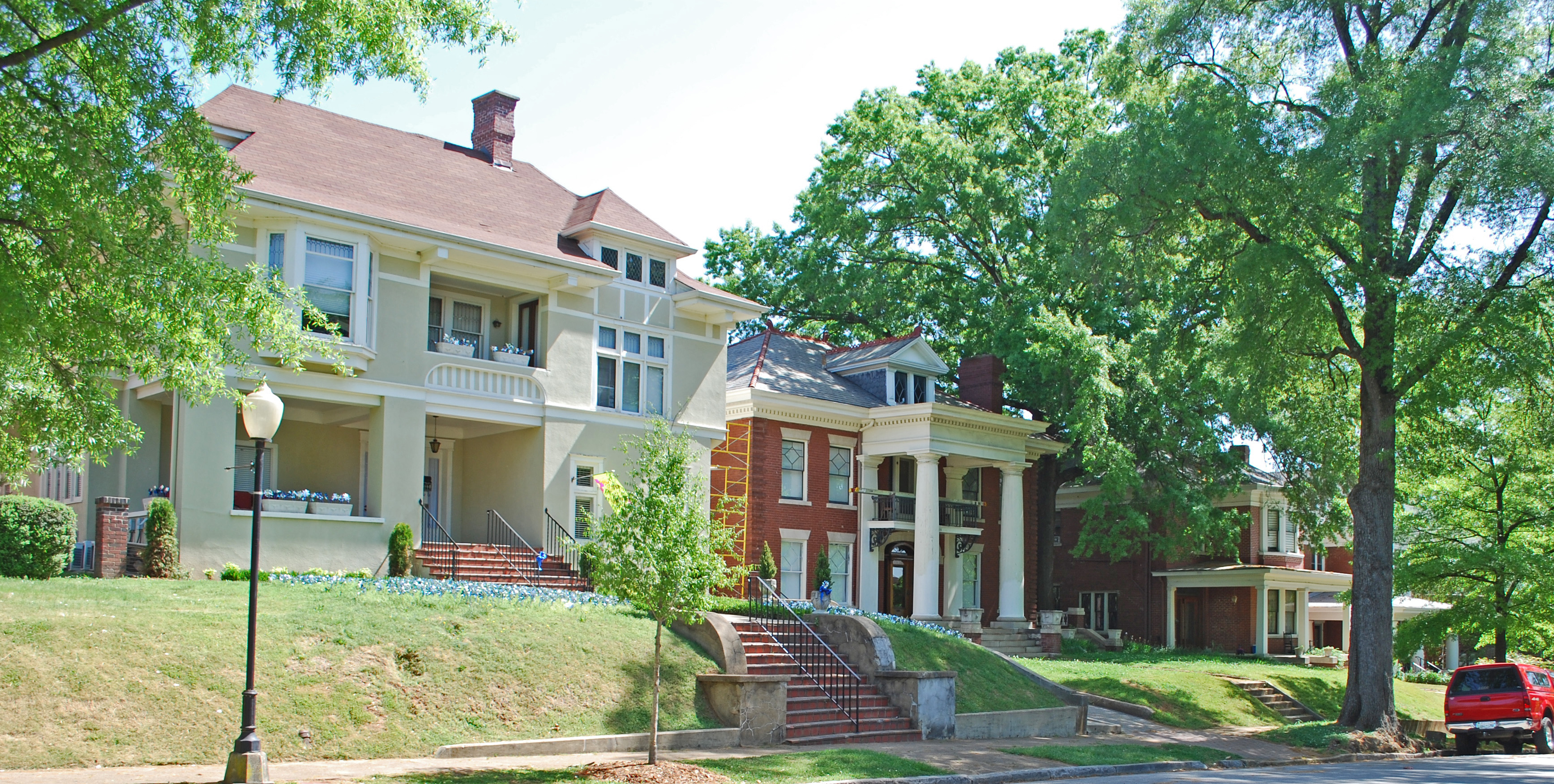
Houses on Vine Street

A fortification during the Civil War, Fort Wood was constructed by the Union Army in 1863. The National Park Service has placed several war-era cannons in the neighborhood. In the 1880s, the fort and surrounding land was auctioned off. In time, Fort Wood became one of Chattanooga's finest residential neighborhoods. Large, fashionable homes soon appeared in the Queen Anne, Tudor Revival, and Romanesque Revival styles.

Fort Wood's revitalization began with the Warner House at the corner of Vine and Palmetto Streets. Also, the City Council gave the Fort Wood area statutory zoning protection and many more houses were under renovation. Today, many of the homes in Fort Wood have been converted into apartments. Indeed, student apartments in this area are highly sought after by UTC students who wish to live off, but close to, the campus.

On April 17, 1979, Fort Wood Historic District was added to the National Register of Historic Places.

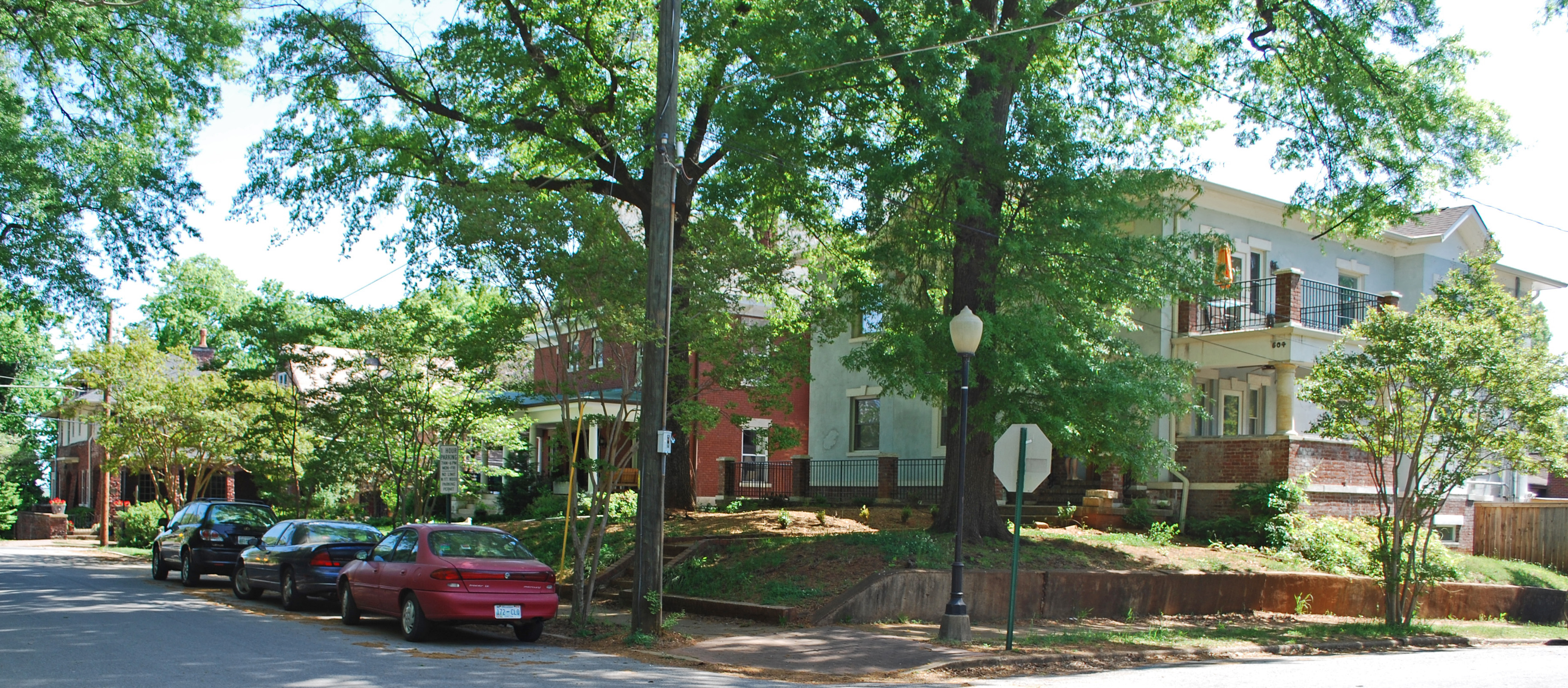
Houses on Fort Wood Street

== Notable structures ==
- Warner House (1891)
- William Gibbs McAdoo house (1888)
- Fort Wood Apartments (1904)
- Sigma Chi Fraternity house was located at 901 Oak St. before it burned down in 1998
- Kappa Sigma Fraternity House (1903)
- Mizpah Congregation synagogue (c. 1928)
- 926 Oak Street Lambda Chi Alpha Fraternity House (1909)
- Z.C. Patten House (1892), known to most UTC students as "Patten House", home of the Alumni Affairs Department. Also notable are the two Civil War-era cannon on the front lawn.
- 900 Oak Street, once a fraternity house, it now houses a Twelve Tribes Community
- Mayor Edmund Watkins House, 801 Vine Street. Built in 1889, now operated as the Mayor's Mansion Inn Bed and Breakfast.
