= Director General of Railroads =

Director General of Railroads was a United States federal government position in the United States Railroad Administration (USRA), whose organization was announced on February 9, 1918. It consisted of the Director General of Railroads and eight major divisions and seven regional offices.

== History ==
President Woodrow Wilson issued an order for nationalization of the railroads on December 26, 1917, and appointed the first Director General, William Gibbs McAdoo, on December 28, 1917. Walker D. Hines was appointed assistant.

The Esch-Cummins Act (Railroad Transportation Act) of 1920 ended USRA control over the railroads on March 1 of that year. The subsequent USRA functions dealt with liquidation and final settlement of accounts.

After January 1, 1926, the position was held by the Secretary of the Treasury, to whom all residual functions were transferred upon the termination of USRA, July 1, 1939.

== Litigation ==
- Bailey v. Hines, Director General of Railroads, 131 Va. 421, 109 S.E. 470.
- Director General Of Railroads v. Kastenbaum, 263 U.S. 25 (1923).
- Hines, Director General of Railroads v. Gravins, 136 Va. 313, 112 S.E. 869, June 15, 1922.

== See also ==
- History of rail transport in the United States
