= Walker Hines (railroad executive) =

American railroad executive

Walker Downer Hines
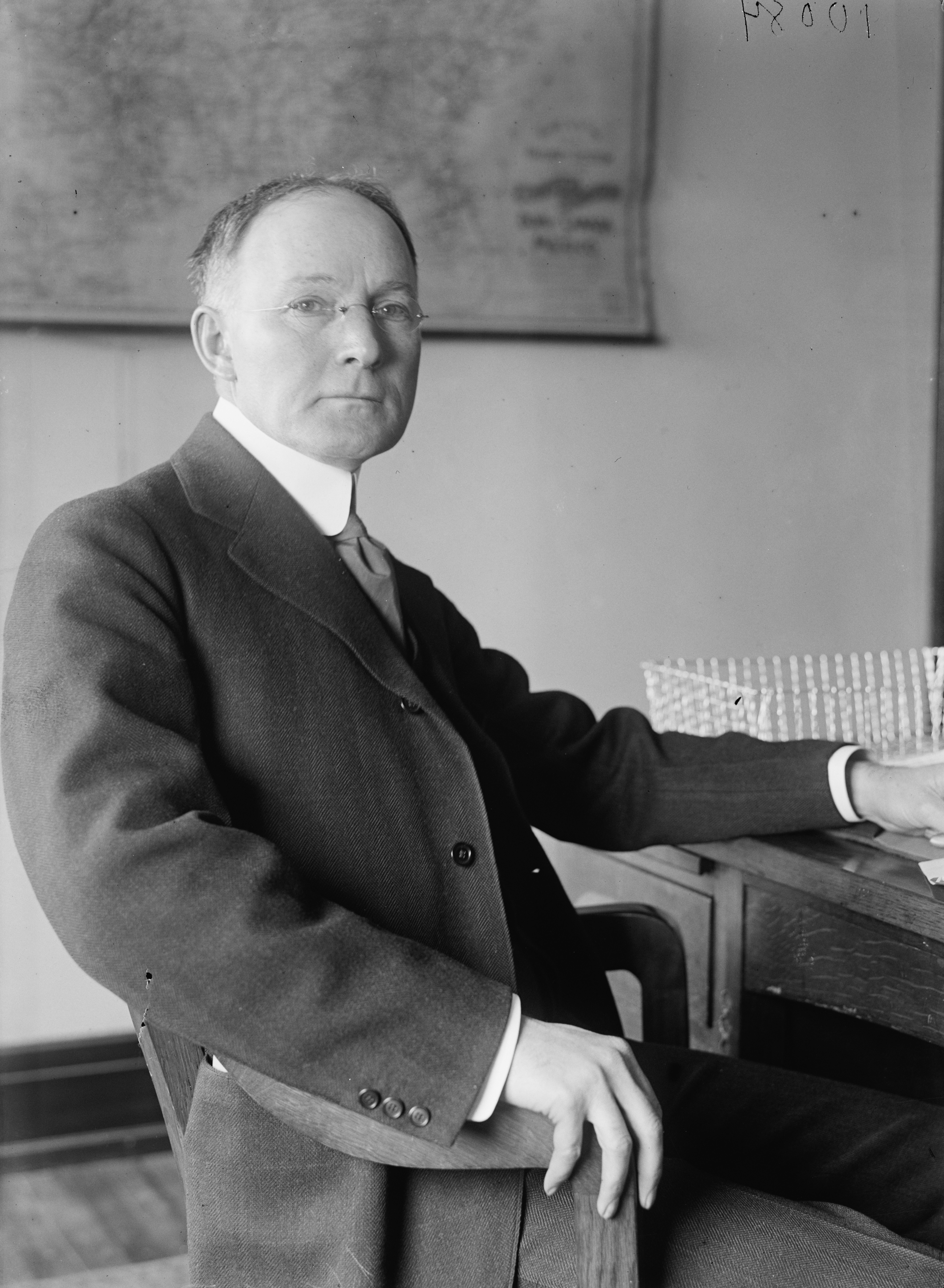
- Hines circa 1918

Director General of Railroads
- In office December 1, 1918 – May 15, 1920
- Appointed by: Woodrow Wilson
- Preceded by: William Gibbs McAdoo
- Succeeded by: Position abolished

Personal details
- Born: February 2, 1870 Russellville, Kentucky
- Died: January 14, 1934 (aged 63) Merano, Italy
- Spouse: Alice Clymer Macfarlane (m. 1900)

Walker Downer Hines (February 2, 1870 – January 14, 1934) was an American railroad executive and second Director General of the United States Railroad Administration.

== Biography ==
Hines was born February 2, 1870, in Russellville, Kentucky, the son of James Madison Hines and Mary Walker Downer.

He graduated from Ogden College in 1888 and the University of Virginia in 1891.

In 1886, aged sixteen, Hines became stenographer for the Circuit Court of Warren County. In 1890 he became secretary to the assistant chief attorney of the Louisville and Nashville Railroad at Louisville, Kentucky. He was appointed assistant attorney after graduating law school, and assistant chief attorney in 1897.

Hines married Alice Clymer Macfarlane in 1900; they had one child.

He was promoted to vice-president of the Louisville and Nashville Railroad in 1901. Hines spent nearly ten years fighting railroad regulation in state and federal courts.

In 1906 he joined Cravath, Henderson and de Gersdoff in New York City, becoming a partner in 1907. He was with the firm for seven more years.

Hines joined the Atchison, Topeka and Santa Fe Railway as general counsel, was made chair of the executive committee in 1908 and chairman of the board in 1916.

In December 1917, President Woodrow Wilson nationalized most U.S. railroads under the United States Railroad Administration. William Gibbs McAdoo was made director general, and Hines agreed to become assistant director general. McAdoo resigned following the November 11 Armistice, and Hines stepped in as director general for the remainder of nationalization under the Railroad Administration, which ended on March 1, 1920. He resigned as director general of the railroads in the United States 24 April, 1920, effective 15 May, 1920. Following the end of World War I, Hines worked and traveled extensively in Europe.

In the latter half of the 1920s, Hines was a director of the Chicago, Burlington and Quincy Railroad, a director of its subsidiary, the Colorado and Southern Railway, general counsel of one of its parent companies, the Great Northern Railway, and a partner in Hines, Rearick, Dorr, Travis and Marshall, which specialized in railroad law.

Hines died of a stroke in Merano, Italy, on January 14, 1934.

== Other service ==
Hines was vice-president of the New York City Bar Association and League of Nations.

== Publications ==
- Hines, Walker D. Report on Danube Navigation for the League of Nations. 1925.
- Hines, Walker D. War History of the American Railroads. 1928.

== See also ==
- List of railroad executives
