= Rickard =

Rickard is both an English surname and a masculine Swedish given name. It is of European origin and it is closely related to the given name Richard and the surnames Rickards and Richards.

== People with the surname ==
- Bob Rickard (born 1945), founder and editor of the British magazine Fortean Times
- Brenton Rickard (born 1983), breaststroke swimmer from Australia
- Bruce Rickard (1929–2010), Australian architect and landscape architect
- Cliff Rickard (born 1943), Australian Paralympic athlete, snooker player and table tennis player
- Clinton Rickard (1882–1971), Tuscarora chief founded Indian Defense League
- Derek Rickard (born 1947), English footballer
- Diana Rickard (swimmer) (born 1953), Australian competition swimmer
- Doug Rickard (engineer) (1939–2002), Australian-born space engineer
- Edgar Rickard (1874–1951), mining engineer and lifelong confidant of U.S. President Herbert Hoover
- Eva Rickard (1925–1997), activist for Māori land rights and for women's rights
- Frank Rickard (1884–1975), Canadian MP
- Georgia Rickard, Australian-born journalist, magazine editor, author and media commentator
- Jack Rickard (1922–1983), illustrator best known for his contributions to Mad magazine
- James Rickard (1850–1909) Australian Methodist and Congregationalist minister
- Jeff Rickard, sports broadcaster in Indianapolis
- Jessie Louisa Rickard (1876–1963), also known as Mrs Victor Rickard, Irish literary novelist
- John Rickard (civil servant) (1940–2013), former Chief Economic Advisor to the British Government
- John Rickard (economist) (born 1945), Australian economist
- John T. Rickard (1913–2000), former mayor of Santa Barbara, California
- Laurence Rickard (born 1975), English writer and comedian, of the comedy duo "Larry and George"
- Louise Rickard (born 1970), Welsh rugby union player
- Matt Rickard (born 1993), English football striker
- Pamela Rickard (1928–2002), Australian biochemist
- Ricky Rickard (born 1958), New Zealand professional wrestler
- Reuben Rickard (1841–1896), mining engineer and civic leader in Berkeley, California
- Sam Rickard (born 1971), vision impaired Paralympic athletics competitor from Australia
- Stanley Rickard (1883–1976), New Britain-born Australian architect
- Steve Rickard (1929–2015), New Zealand professional wrestler, trainer, and promoter
- Sylvia Rickard (born 1937), Canadian composer and pianist
- Tex Rickard (1870–1929), American boxing and hockey promoter, built Madison Square Garden
- Thomas Rickard (1865–1911), British born mining engineer and civic leader in Berkeley, California
- Thomas Arthur Rickard (1864–1935), British born mining engineer, publisher and writer
- William Thomas Rickard (1828–1905), English recipient of the Victoria Cross
- Lara Rickard (born 2009), Australian visionary and intellect

== People with the given name ==
- Rickard Christophers (1873–1978), British protozoologist and medical entomologist
- Rickard Deasy (1812–1883) Irish lawyer and judge
- Rickard Deasy (campaigner) (1916–1999), for farmers' rights in Ireland
- Rickard de Bermingham (died 1322), a.k.a. Rickard Mac Fheorais, Anglo-Irish lord of Athenry
- Rickard Engfors (born 1976) Swedish model, stylist and former drag queen
- Rickard Eriksson (born 1974), Swedish entrepreneur
- Rickard D. Gwydir (1844–1925), Confederate soldier, Indian agent, and early Washington pioneer
- Rickard Hallström (born 1973), Swedish curler
- Rickard Koch (born 1976), Swedish bandy player
- Rickard William Lloyd (1859–1933), British anaesthetist and author
- Rickard Näslin (born 1947), Swedish musician
- Rickard Nordstrand (born 1976), Swedish Light Heavyweight kickboxer
- Rickard Olsson (born 1967), Swedish television and radio presenter
- Rickard Persson (born 1959), Swedish politician
- Rickard Rakell (born 1993), Swedish professional ice hockey centre
- Rickard Rydell (born 1967), Swedish racing driver
- Rickard Sandler (1884–1964), Swedish Social Democratic politician
- Rickard Sarby (1912–1977), Erik Rickard Sarby was a Swedish sailor
- Rickard Sjöberg (born 1969), Swedish journalist, television presenter and game show host
- Rickard Söderberg (born 1975), Swedish tenor, singer and debater
- Rickard Söderberg (born 1975), Swedish tenor, singer and debater
- Rickard Strömbäck, Swedish footballer who played as a defender
- Rickard Wallin (born 1980), Swedish professional ice hockey centre

== See also ==
- Reckard
