= 1920 United States presidential election in Illinois =

- November 2, 1920

All 29 Illinois votes to the Electoral College
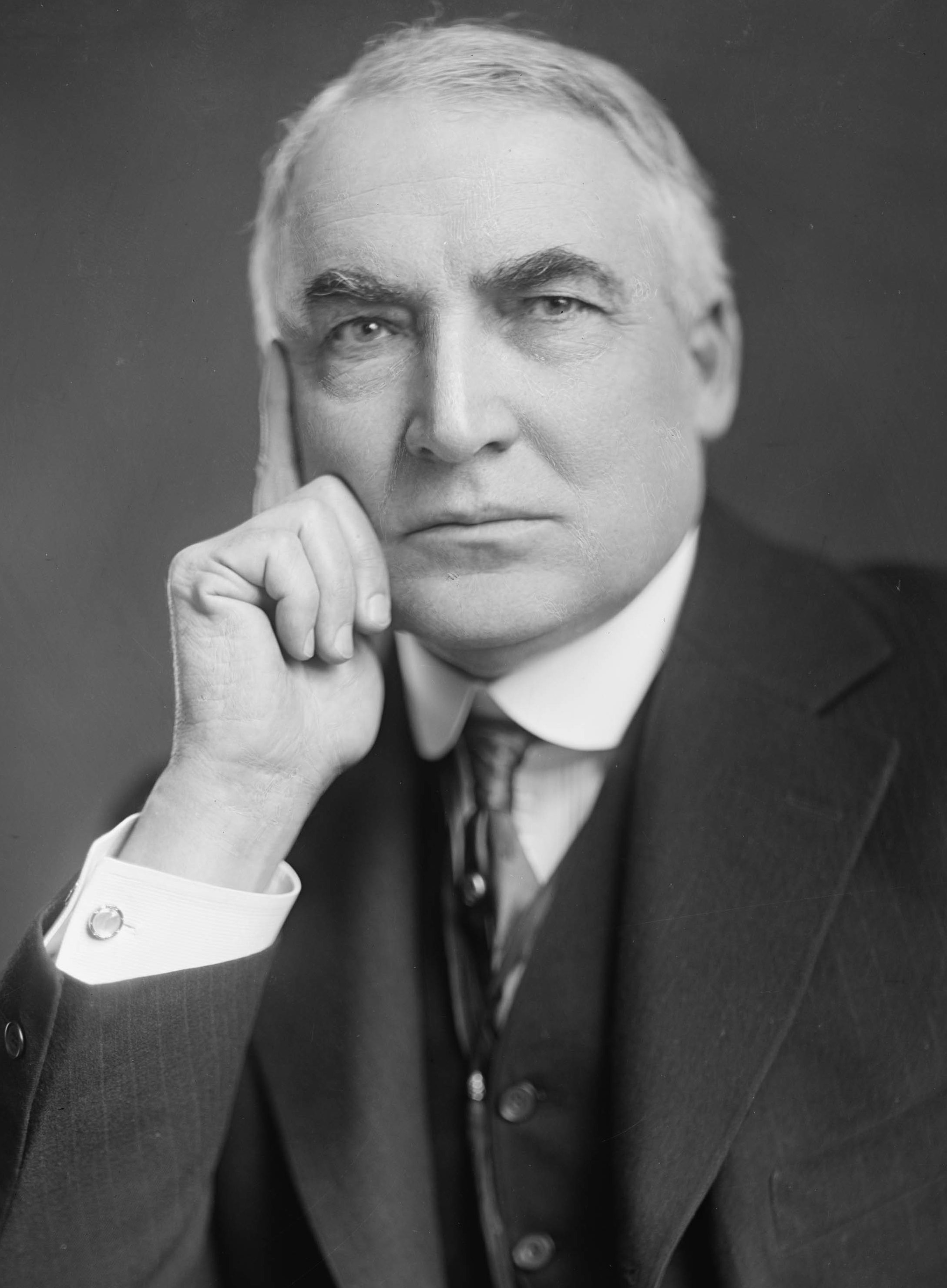

| Nominee | Warren G. Harding | James M. Cox |
| Party | Republican | Democratic |
| Home state | Ohio | Ohio |
| Running mate | Calvin Coolidge | Franklin D. Roosevelt |
| Electoral vote | 29 | 0 |
| Popular vote | 1,420,480 | 534,395 |
| Percentage | 67.81% | 25.51% |
County results
Harding
40–50%
50–60%
60–70%
70–80%
80–90%
Cox
40–50%
50–60%
President before election
Woodrow Wilson
Democratic
Elected President
Warren G. Harding
Republican

The 1920 United States presidential election in Illinois took place on November 2, 1920, as part of the 1920 United States presidential election. State voters chose 29 representatives, or electors, to the Electoral College, who voted for president and vice president.

A strongly Democratic state during the Second Party System, Illinois became Republican-leaning after the American Civil War due to a combination of strong Free Soil Party heritage amongst its Yankee northern counties with the wartime conversion of some Virginian-settled rock-ribbed Democratic Southern Illinois counties to Unionist Republicanism à la Appalachia. Between the Civil War and World War I, partisanship in Illinois – like in the Border States – largely re-fought the war, with the result that although the Democratic Party gained at least 43 percent of the statewide vote via Southern and German Catholic support in every election up to 1900, they never gained an absolute majority and carried the state's electoral votes only in 1892.

Due to the Democratic Party's growing Populist and prohibitionist leanings, a decline in Democratic support after 1900 in its German Central Illinois strongholds transformed Illinois into a powerfully Republican state at all levels. Even Woodrow Wilson in 1912 when the GOP was mortally divided carried the state by only a very narrow margin. Harding's managers were always confident he would carry Illinois as all but three GOP nominees had since that party was formed. However, actual polls in Illinois vacillated, with a straw ballot in The Farm Journal even placing Cox at 45 percent in this strong Republican state. As election day neared, estimates of a Republican plurality of “at least 264,000” were made via a national survey of newspaper editors.

As it turned out, the editorial estimate was shown extremely conservative by the very earliest reports on polling day, which showed Harding winning by three-to-one. Ultimately, Harding did not finish with so large a margin as this, but nonetheless he carried Illinois by 42.30 percentage points. This constitutes the biggest margin by which Illinois has been carried in the state's presidential election history, the best performance by any Republican candidate, and the third-best vote percentage overall behind Andrew Jackson’s two efforts in 1828 and 1832. Harding carried all but three counties, and was the first-ever Republican victor in the following counties: Calhoun, Cass, Clinton, Effingham, Gallatin, Hamilton, Jasper, Jersey, Mason, Pike, Schuyler, Wabash and White.

== Primaries ==
The general election coincided with the general election for other federal offices (Senate and House), as well as those for state offices.

=== Turnout ===
The total vote in the state-run primary elections (Democratic, Republican, Socialist) was 408,586.

The total vote in the general election was 2,094,714. Both major parties, as well as the Socialist Party, held non-binding state-run preferential primaries on April 13.

=== Democratic ===
1920 Illinois Democratic presidential primary
- April 13, 1920
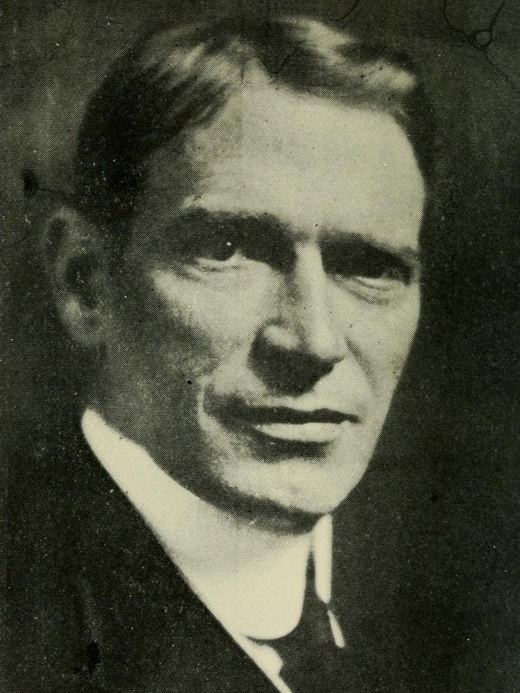

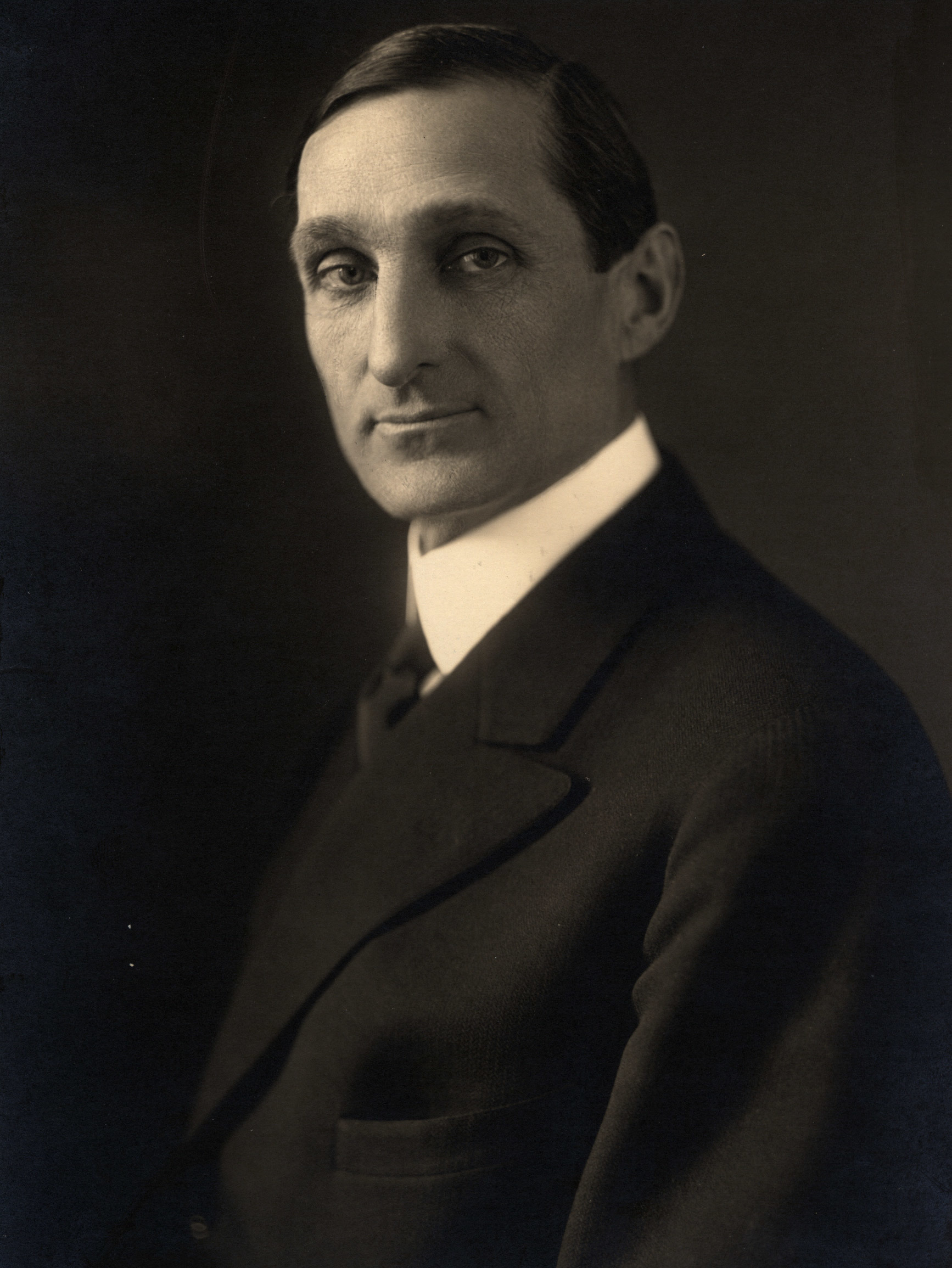

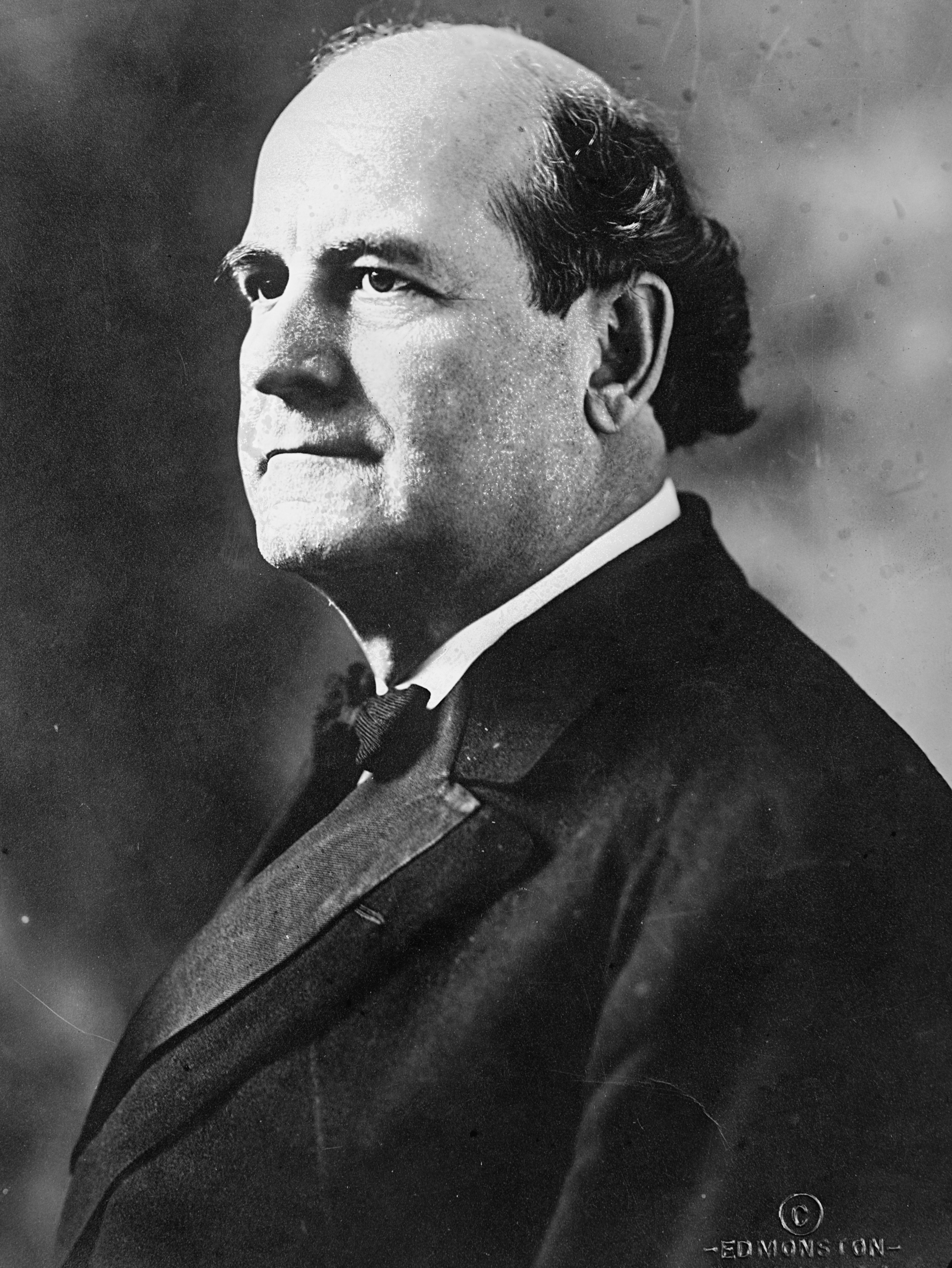
| Candidate | Edward I. Edwards | William G. McAdoo | William Jennings Bryan |
| Home state | New Jersey | California | Nebraska |
| Popular vote | 6,117 | 3,401 | 1,879 |
| Percentage | 33.04% | 18.37% | 10.15% |

The 1920 Illinois Democratic presidential primary was held on April 13, 1920 in the U.S. state of Illinois as one of the Democratic Party's state primaries ahead of the 1920 presidential election.

The popular vote was a non-binding "beauty contest". Delegates were instead elected by direct votes by congressional district on delegate candidates. Delegate candidates either were listed on the ballot with their preference on for a particular presidential candidate, or were listed as expressing no preference. However, these delegates officially were uninstructed. 50 of the sate's 58 convention delegates were elected by this means, with eight further uninstructed delegates later being selected May 10 at the state party convention.

1920 Illinois Democratic presidential primary
| Candidate | Votes | % |
|---|---|---|
| Edward I. Edwards (write-in) | 6,117 | 33.04 |
| William G. McAdoo (write-in) | 3,401 | 18.37 |
| William J. Bryan (write-in) | 1,879 | 10.15 |
| Woodrow Wilson (incumbent) (write-in) | 879 | 4.75 |
| Champ Clark (write-in) | 536 | 2.90 |
| James M. Cox (write-in) | 259 | 1.40 |
| James Hamilton Lewis (write-in) | 38 | 0.21 |
| Scattering | 5,405 | 29.19 |
| Total votes | 18,514 | 100 |

=== Republican ===
1920 Illinois Republican presidential primary
- April 13, 1920
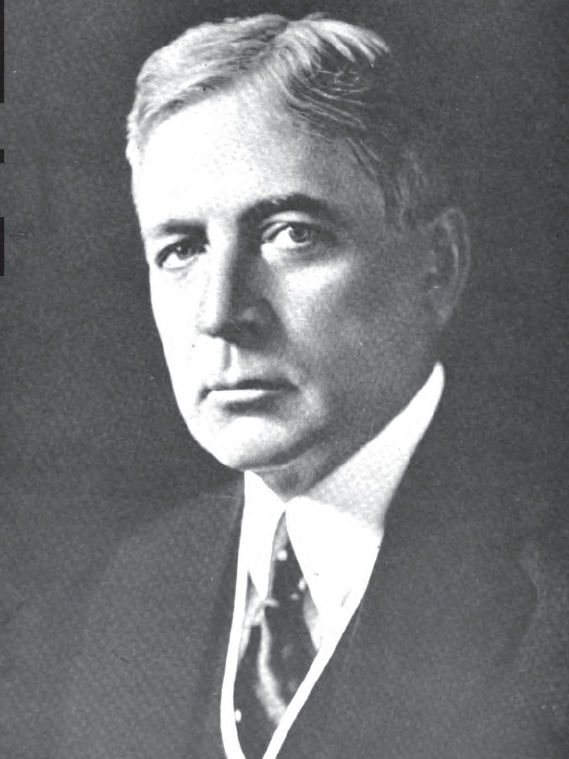

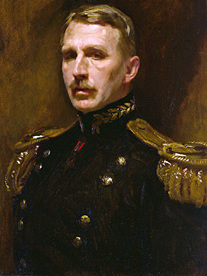

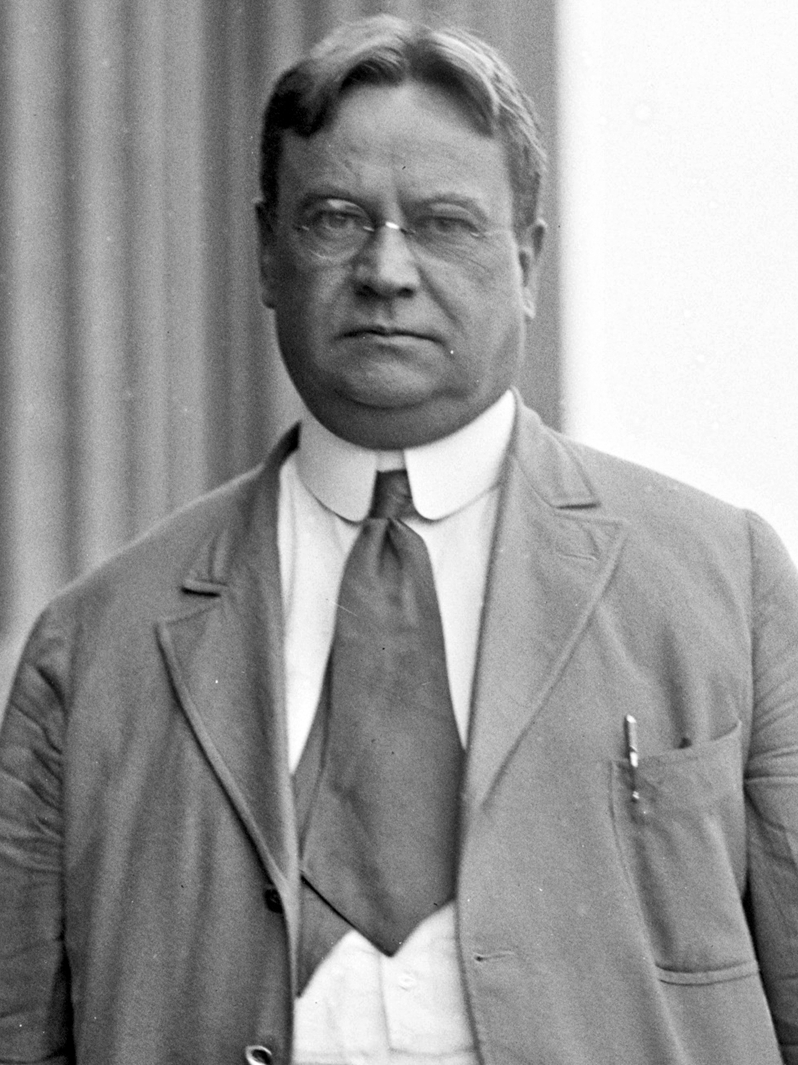
| Candidate | Frank Orren Lowden | Leonard Wood | Hiram Johnson |
| Home state | Illinois | New Hampshire | California |
| Popular vote | 197,073 | 132,522 | 56,242 |
| Percentage | 50.54% | 33.98% | 14.42% |

The 1920 Illinois Republican presidential primary was held on April 13, 1920, in the U.S. state of Illinois as one of the Republican Party's state primaries ahead of the 1920 presidential election.

The preference vote was a "beauty contest". Delegates were instead selected by direct vote in each congressional district on delegate candidates. Delegate candidates either were listed on the ballot with their preference on for a particular presidential candidate, or were listed as expressing no preference.

1920 Illinois Republican presidential primary
| Candidate | Votes | % |
|---|---|---|
| Frank O. Lowden | 197,073 | 50.54 |
| Leonard Wood | 132,522 | 33.98 |
| Hiram W. Johnson (write-in) | 56,242 | 14.42 |
| Herbert Hoover (write-in) | 2,274 | 0.58 |
| William Hale Thompson (write-in) | 686 | 0.18 |
| Scattering | 1,169 | 0.30 |
| Total votes | 389,966 | 100 |

=== Socialist ===
1920 Illinois Socialist presidential primary
- April 13, 1920
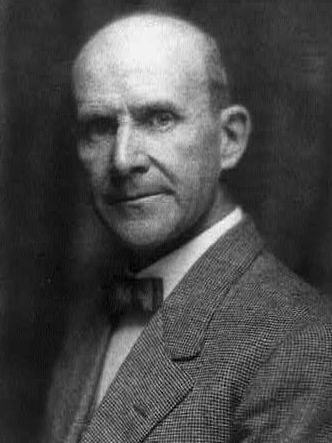
| Candidate | Eugene V. Debs |
| Home state | Indiana |
| Popular vote | 102 |
| Percentage | 96.23% |

The 1920 Illinois Socialist presidential primary was held on April 13, 1920, in the U.S. state of Illinois as one of the Socialist Party's state primaries ahead of the 1920 presidential election.

1920 Illinois Socialist presidential primary
| Candidate | Votes | % |
|---|---|---|
| Eugene V. Debs | 102 | 96.23 |
| Scattering | 4 | 3.77 |
| Total votes | 106 | 100 |

== Results ==
| Presidential Candidate | Running Mate | Party | Electoral Vote (EV) | Popular Vote (PV) | |
|---|---|---|---|---|---|
| Warren G. Harding of Ohio | Calvin Coolidge | Republican | 29 | 1,420,480 | 67.81% |
| James M. Cox | Franklin D. Roosevelt | Democratic | 0 | 534,395 | 25.51% |
| Eugene V. Debs | Seymour Stedman | Socialist | 0 | 74,747 | 3.57% |
| Parley P. Christensen | Max S. Hayes | Farmer-Labor | 0 | 49,630 | 2.37% |
| Aaron S. Watkins | Leigh Colvin | Prohibition | 0 | 11,216 | 0.54% |
| William Wesley Cox | August Gillhaus | Socialist Labor | 0 | 3,471 | 0.17% |
| Robert Macauley | Richard Barnum | Single Tax | 0 | 775 | 0.04% |

=== Results by county ===
| County | Warren Gamaliel Harding Republican | | James Middleton Cox Democratic | | Eugene Victor Debs Socialist | | Parley Parker Christensen Farmer-Labor | | Various candidates Other parties | | Margin | | Total votes cast |
| County | # | % | # | % | # | % | # | % | # | % | # | % | Total votes cast |
|---|---|---|---|---|---|---|---|---|---|---|---|---|---|
| Adams | 12,852 | 57.07% | 7,222 | 32.07% | 373 | 1.66% | 1,877 | 8.33% | 197 | 0.87% | 5,630 | 25.00% | 22,521 |
| Alexander | 5,287 | 61.92% | 3,167 | 37.09% | 58 | 0.68% | 5 | 0.06% | 22 | 0.26% | 2,120 | 24.83% | 8,539 |
| Bond | 3,662 | 64.67% | 1,533 | 27.07% | 45 | 0.79% | 191 | 3.37% | 232 | 4.10% | 2,129 | 37.59% | 5,663 |
| Boone | 5,386 | 89.39% | 496 | 8.23% | 104 | 1.73% | 10 | 0.17% | 29 | 0.48% | 4,890 | 81.16% | 6,025 |
| Brown | 1,590 | 45.08% | 1,866 | 52.91% | 7 | 0.20% | 5 | 0.14% | 59 | 1.67% | -276 | -7.83% | 3,527 |
| Bureau | 9,968 | 74.94% | 2,354 | 17.70% | 607 | 4.56% | 186 | 1.40% | 187 | 1.41% | 7,614 | 57.24% | 13,302 |
| Calhoun | 1,367 | 64.82% | 703 | 33.33% | 14 | 0.66% | 4 | 0.19% | 21 | 1.00% | 664 | 31.48% | 2,109 |
| Carroll | 5,194 | 86.65% | 606 | 10.11% | 87 | 1.45% | 65 | 1.08% | 42 | 0.70% | 4,588 | 76.54% | 5,994 |
| Cass | 3,956 | 54.06% | 2,861 | 39.10% | 53 | 0.72% | 374 | 5.11% | 74 | 1.01% | 1,095 | 14.96% | 7,318 |
| Champaign | 15,573 | 71.83% | 5,247 | 24.20% | 159 | 0.73% | 409 | 1.89% | 293 | 1.35% | 10,326 | 47.63% | 21,681 |
| Christian | 7,535 | 52.75% | 5,398 | 37.79% | 347 | 2.43% | 741 | 5.19% | 264 | 1.85% | 2,137 | 14.96% | 14,285 |
| Clark | 5,312 | 55.35% | 4,181 | 43.57% | 33 | 0.34% | 7 | 0.07% | 64 | 0.67% | 1,131 | 11.78% | 9,597 |
| Clay | 3,683 | 59.90% | 2,358 | 38.35% | 75 | 1.22% | 9 | 0.15% | 24 | 0.39% | 1,325 | 21.55% | 6,149 |
| Clinton | 4,564 | 63.71% | 1,661 | 23.19% | 241 | 3.36% | 630 | 8.79% | 68 | 0.95% | 2,903 | 40.52% | 7,164 |
| Coles | 8,563 | 58.76% | 5,811 | 39.87% | 86 | 0.59% | 9 | 0.06% | 105 | 0.72% | 2,752 | 18.88% | 14,574 |
| Cook | 635,197 | 71.12% | 197,499 | 22.11% | 52,475 | 5.88% | 4,966 | 0.56% | 3,000 | 0.34% | 437,698 | 49.01% | 893,137 |
| Crawford | 5,188 | 55.02% | 4,092 | 43.39% | 52 | 0.55% | 2 | 0.02% | 96 | 1.02% | 1,096 | 11.62% | 9,430 |
| Cumberland | 3,095 | 58.18% | 2,162 | 40.64% | 11 | 0.21% | 3 | 0.06% | 49 | 0.92% | 933 | 17.54% | 5,320 |
| DeKalb | 10,374 | 83.93% | 1,700 | 13.75% | 163 | 1.32% | 43 | 0.35% | 81 | 0.66% | 8,674 | 70.17% | 12,361 |
| DeWitt | 5,001 | 60.68% | 3,079 | 37.36% | 52 | 0.63% | 39 | 0.47% | 71 | 0.86% | 1,922 | 23.32% | 8,242 |
| Douglas | 4,885 | 65.21% | 2,308 | 30.81% | 51 | 0.68% | 148 | 1.98% | 99 | 1.32% | 2,577 | 34.40% | 7,491 |
| DuPage | 12,280 | 82.00% | 2,084 | 13.92% | 349 | 2.33% | 121 | 0.81% | 142 | 0.95% | 10,196 | 68.08% | 14,976 |
| Edgar | 6,750 | 53.29% | 5,694 | 44.95% | 136 | 1.07% | 6 | 0.05% | 81 | 0.64% | 1,056 | 8.34% | 12,667 |
| Edwards | 3,002 | 79.21% | 742 | 19.58% | 0 | 0.00% | 0 | 0.00% | 46 | 1.21% | 2,260 | 59.63% | 3,790 |
| Effingham | 4,176 | 57.47% | 2,985 | 41.08% | 43 | 0.59% | 16 | 0.22% | 47 | 0.65% | 1,191 | 16.39% | 7,267 |
| Fayette | 5,758 | 58.48% | 3,824 | 38.84% | 108 | 1.10% | 45 | 0.46% | 111 | 1.13% | 1,934 | 19.64% | 9,846 |
| Ford | 4,995 | 82.40% | 958 | 15.80% | 22 | 0.36% | 30 | 0.49% | 57 | 0.94% | 4,037 | 66.60% | 6,062 |
| Franklin | 7,608 | 51.11% | 4,894 | 32.88% | 584 | 3.92% | 1,630 | 10.95% | 170 | 1.14% | 2,714 | 18.23% | 14,886 |
| Fulton | 9,523 | 59.25% | 5,293 | 32.93% | 743 | 4.62% | 248 | 1.54% | 265 | 1.65% | 4,230 | 26.32% | 16,072 |
| Gallatin | 2,184 | 49.94% | 2,000 | 45.74% | 37 | 0.85% | 116 | 2.65% | 36 | 0.82% | 184 | 4.21% | 4,373 |
| Greene | 3,685 | 47.96% | 3,776 | 49.15% | 63 | 0.82% | 110 | 1.43% | 49 | 0.64% | -91 | -1.18% | 7,683 |
| Grundy | 4,647 | 80.05% | 803 | 13.83% | 82 | 1.41% | 225 | 3.88% | 48 | 0.83% | 3,844 | 66.22% | 5,805 |
| Hamilton | 3,220 | 54.71% | 2,591 | 44.02% | 27 | 0.46% | 24 | 0.41% | 24 | 0.41% | 629 | 10.69% | 5,886 |
| Hancock | 7,379 | 57.75% | 5,125 | 40.11% | 64 | 0.50% | 32 | 0.25% | 178 | 1.39% | 2,254 | 17.64% | 12,778 |
| Hardin | 1,555 | 61.54% | 943 | 37.32% | 8 | 0.32% | 10 | 0.40% | 11 | 0.44% | 612 | 24.22% | 2,527 |
| Henderson | 2,747 | 76.65% | 740 | 20.65% | 23 | 0.64% | 14 | 0.39% | 60 | 1.67% | 2,007 | 56.00% | 3,584 |
| Henry | 12,379 | 78.96% | 2,530 | 16.14% | 436 | 2.78% | 129 | 0.82% | 203 | 1.29% | 9,849 | 62.82% | 15,677 |
| Iroquois | 9,186 | 77.79% | 2,429 | 20.57% | 35 | 0.30% | 20 | 0.17% | 139 | 1.18% | 6,757 | 57.22% | 11,809 |
| Jackson | 8,003 | 59.96% | 4,575 | 34.28% | 75 | 0.56% | 590 | 4.42% | 104 | 0.78% | 3,428 | 25.68% | 13,347 |
| Jasper | 3,279 | 51.63% | 2,971 | 46.78% | 41 | 0.65% | 6 | 0.09% | 54 | 0.85% | 308 | 4.85% | 6,351 |
| Jefferson | 5,711 | 53.57% | 4,772 | 44.77% | 64 | 0.60% | 30 | 0.28% | 83 | 0.78% | 939 | 8.81% | 10,660 |
| Jersey | 2,873 | 57.90% | 1,999 | 40.29% | 23 | 0.46% | 20 | 0.40% | 47 | 0.95% | 874 | 17.61% | 4,962 |
| Jo Daviess | 6,098 | 76.25% | 1,604 | 20.06% | 203 | 2.54% | 28 | 0.35% | 64 | 0.80% | 4,494 | 56.20% | 7,997 |
| Johnson | 2,972 | 70.91% | 1,137 | 27.13% | 38 | 0.91% | 28 | 0.67% | 16 | 0.38% | 1,835 | 43.78% | 4,191 |
| Kane | 26,832 | 82.82% | 4,323 | 13.34% | 756 | 2.33% | 278 | 0.86% | 209 | 0.65% | 22,509 | 69.48% | 32,398 |
| Kankakee | 12,853 | 79.33% | 2,828 | 17.46% | 82 | 0.51% | 353 | 2.18% | 85 | 0.52% | 10,025 | 61.88% | 16,201 |
| Kendall | 3,459 | 87.99% | 439 | 11.17% | 8 | 0.20% | 3 | 0.08% | 22 | 0.56% | 3,020 | 76.83% | 3,931 |
| Knox | 12,559 | 73.85% | 2,852 | 16.77% | 233 | 1.37% | 1,184 | 6.96% | 177 | 1.04% | 9,707 | 57.08% | 17,005 |
| Lake | 15,712 | 82.28% | 2,321 | 12.15% | 787 | 4.12% | 159 | 0.83% | 117 | 0.61% | 13,391 | 70.12% | 19,096 |
| LaSalle | 23,751 | 73.23% | 6,626 | 20.43% | 927 | 2.86% | 943 | 2.91% | 187 | 0.58% | 17,125 | 52.80% | 32,434 |
| Lawrence | 4,720 | 54.17% | 3,707 | 42.54% | 100 | 1.15% | 7 | 0.08% | 180 | 2.07% | 1,013 | 11.62% | 8,714 |
| Lee | 7,615 | 78.94% | 1,715 | 17.78% | 173 | 1.79% | 38 | 0.39% | 105 | 1.09% | 5,900 | 61.17% | 9,646 |
| Livingston | 10,382 | 74.83% | 3,101 | 22.35% | 74 | 0.53% | 195 | 1.41% | 122 | 0.88% | 7,281 | 52.48% | 13,874 |
| Logan | 6,957 | 64.79% | 3,232 | 30.10% | 199 | 1.85% | 198 | 1.84% | 152 | 1.42% | 3,725 | 34.69% | 10,738 |
| Macon | 16,486 | 65.27% | 7,917 | 31.35% | 378 | 1.50% | 236 | 0.93% | 240 | 0.95% | 8,569 | 33.93% | 25,257 |
| Macoupin | 8,700 | 44.68% | 5,936 | 30.49% | 1,208 | 6.20% | 3,320 | 17.05% | 306 | 1.57% | 2,764 | 14.20% | 19,470 |
| Madison | 19,249 | 57.82% | 10,149 | 30.48% | 1,000 | 3.00% | 2,613 | 7.85% | 281 | 0.84% | 9,100 | 27.33% | 33,292 |
| Marion | 6,620 | 52.06% | 4,351 | 34.22% | 157 | 1.23% | 1,379 | 10.85% | 208 | 1.64% | 2,269 | 17.85% | 12,715 |
| Marshall | 3,734 | 67.61% | 1,568 | 28.39% | 108 | 1.96% | 80 | 1.45% | 33 | 0.60% | 2,166 | 39.22% | 5,523 |
| Mason | 3,842 | 58.40% | 2,595 | 39.44% | 43 | 0.65% | 29 | 0.44% | 70 | 1.06% | 1,247 | 18.95% | 6,579 |
| Massac | 3,731 | 82.98% | 688 | 15.30% | 14 | 0.31% | 29 | 0.65% | 34 | 0.76% | 3,043 | 67.68% | 4,496 |
| McDonough | 7,221 | 63.18% | 3,930 | 34.38% | 118 | 1.03% | 30 | 0.26% | 131 | 1.15% | 3,291 | 28.79% | 11,430 |
| McHenry | 9,885 | 85.10% | 1,536 | 13.22% | 104 | 0.90% | 28 | 0.24% | 63 | 0.54% | 8,349 | 71.88% | 11,616 |
| McLean | 16,680 | 65.27% | 6,411 | 25.09% | 133 | 0.52% | 1,904 | 7.45% | 427 | 1.67% | 10,269 | 40.18% | 25,555 |
| Menard | 2,882 | 59.19% | 1,864 | 38.28% | 30 | 0.62% | 24 | 0.49% | 69 | 1.42% | 1,018 | 20.91% | 4,869 |
| Mercer | 5,531 | 74.58% | 1,574 | 21.22% | 90 | 1.21% | 102 | 1.38% | 119 | 1.60% | 3,957 | 53.36% | 7,416 |
| Monroe | 2,955 | 70.11% | 932 | 22.11% | 42 | 1.00% | 271 | 6.43% | 15 | 0.36% | 2,023 | 48.00% | 4,215 |
| Montgomery | 7,429 | 52.92% | 4,756 | 33.88% | 216 | 1.54% | 1,365 | 9.72% | 273 | 1.94% | 2,673 | 19.04% | 14,039 |
| Morgan | 8,169 | 62.87% | 4,447 | 34.23% | 151 | 1.16% | 114 | 0.88% | 112 | 0.86% | 3,722 | 28.65% | 12,993 |
| Moultrie | 3,279 | 55.76% | 2,513 | 42.73% | 24 | 0.41% | 17 | 0.29% | 48 | 0.82% | 766 | 13.02% | 5,881 |
| Ogle | 9,322 | 82.99% | 1,720 | 15.31% | 75 | 0.67% | 13 | 0.12% | 103 | 0.92% | 7,602 | 67.68% | 11,233 |
| Peoria | 24,541 | 66.00% | 9,453 | 25.42% | 712 | 1.91% | 2,174 | 5.85% | 302 | 0.81% | 15,088 | 40.58% | 37,182 |
| Perry | 4,598 | 58.47% | 2,478 | 31.51% | 101 | 1.28% | 544 | 6.92% | 143 | 1.82% | 2,120 | 26.96% | 7,864 |
| Piatt | 4,283 | 68.16% | 1,903 | 30.28% | 34 | 0.54% | 4 | 0.06% | 60 | 0.95% | 2,380 | 37.87% | 6,284 |
| Pike | 5,564 | 54.12% | 4,279 | 41.62% | 178 | 1.73% | 68 | 0.66% | 191 | 1.86% | 1,285 | 12.50% | 10,280 |
| Pope | 2,486 | 77.42% | 687 | 21.40% | 24 | 0.75% | 8 | 0.25% | 6 | 0.19% | 1,799 | 56.03% | 3,211 |
| Pulaski | 4,002 | 62.85% | 2,276 | 35.74% | 45 | 0.71% | 8 | 0.13% | 37 | 0.58% | 1,726 | 27.10% | 6,368 |
| Putnam | 1,623 | 74.04% | 362 | 16.51% | 72 | 3.28% | 119 | 5.43% | 16 | 0.73% | 1,261 | 57.53% | 2,192 |
| Randolph | 6,180 | 62.54% | 3,181 | 32.19% | 135 | 1.37% | 305 | 3.09% | 81 | 0.82% | 2,999 | 30.35% | 9,882 |
| Richland | 3,026 | 57.05% | 2,174 | 40.99% | 41 | 0.77% | 5 | 0.09% | 58 | 1.09% | 852 | 16.06% | 5,304 |
| Rock Island | 21,908 | 71.32% | 5,208 | 16.95% | 2,221 | 7.23% | 1,123 | 3.66% | 259 | 0.84% | 16,700 | 54.36% | 30,719 |
| Saline | 6,722 | 52.96% | 3,500 | 27.58% | 70 | 0.55% | 2,321 | 18.29% | 79 | 0.62% | 3,222 | 25.39% | 12,692 |
| Sangamon | 21,820 | 59.42% | 11,000 | 29.95% | 752 | 2.05% | 2,691 | 7.33% | 460 | 1.25% | 10,820 | 29.46% | 36,723 |
| Schuyler | 2,800 | 53.86% | 2,258 | 43.43% | 24 | 0.46% | 8 | 0.15% | 109 | 2.10% | 542 | 10.43% | 5,199 |
| Scott | 2,075 | 52.25% | 1,786 | 44.98% | 19 | 0.48% | 44 | 1.11% | 47 | 1.18% | 289 | 7.28% | 3,971 |
| Shelby | 6,351 | 53.93% | 5,113 | 43.42% | 68 | 0.58% | 33 | 0.28% | 211 | 1.79% | 1,238 | 10.51% | 11,776 |
| St. Clair | 21,681 | 51.34% | 14,032 | 33.23% | 1,326 | 3.14% | 4,851 | 11.49% | 341 | 0.81% | 7,649 | 18.11% | 42,231 |
| Stark | 2,750 | 79.57% | 661 | 19.13% | 13 | 0.38% | 16 | 0.46% | 16 | 0.46% | 2,089 | 60.45% | 3,456 |
| Stephenson | 9,570 | 74.64% | 2,772 | 21.62% | 272 | 2.12% | 99 | 0.77% | 108 | 0.84% | 6,798 | 53.02% | 12,821 |
| Tazewell | 7,679 | 62.69% | 3,640 | 29.71% | 229 | 1.87% | 546 | 4.46% | 156 | 1.27% | 4,039 | 32.97% | 12,250 |
| Union | 3,119 | 45.55% | 3,660 | 53.45% | 25 | 0.37% | 5 | 0.07% | 38 | 0.55% | -541 | -7.90% | 6,847 |
| Vermilion | 18,175 | 61.74% | 8,634 | 29.33% | 389 | 1.32% | 1,714 | 5.82% | 527 | 1.79% | 9,541 | 32.41% | 29,439 |
| Wabash | 2,871 | 52.40% | 2,514 | 45.88% | 23 | 0.42% | 10 | 0.18% | 61 | 1.11% | 357 | 6.52% | 5,479 |
| Warren | 6,309 | 69.41% | 2,236 | 24.60% | 105 | 1.16% | 280 | 3.08% | 160 | 1.76% | 4,073 | 44.81% | 9,090 |
| Washington | 4,519 | 70.76% | 1,102 | 17.26% | 66 | 1.03% | 654 | 10.24% | 45 | 0.70% | 3,417 | 53.51% | 6,386 |
| Wayne | 4,908 | 60.50% | 3,137 | 38.67% | 25 | 0.31% | 2 | 0.02% | 41 | 0.51% | 1,771 | 21.83% | 8,113 |
| White | 4,494 | 51.23% | 4,148 | 47.29% | 89 | 1.01% | 5 | 0.06% | 36 | 0.41% | 346 | 3.94% | 8,772 |
| Whiteside | 10,923 | 81.74% | 1,927 | 14.42% | 125 | 0.94% | 220 | 1.65% | 168 | 1.26% | 8,996 | 67.32% | 13,363 |
| Will | 21,746 | 76.37% | 5,410 | 19.00% | 490 | 1.72% | 682 | 2.40% | 146 | 0.51% | 16,336 | 57.37% | 28,474 |
| Williamson | 10,118 | 56.73% | 4,728 | 26.51% | 296 | 1.66% | 2,402 | 13.47% | 290 | 1.63% | 5,390 | 30.22% | 17,834 |
| Winnebago | 19,913 | 79.23% | 3,355 | 13.35% | 1,175 | 4.67% | 507 | 2.02% | 184 | 0.73% | 16,558 | 65.88% | 25,134 |
| Woodford | 4,929 | 69.06% | 1,977 | 27.70% | 76 | 1.06% | 69 | 0.97% | 86 | 1.20% | 2,952 | 41.36% | 7,137 |
| Totals | 1,420,480 | 67.81% | 534,395 | 25.51% | 74,747 | 3.57% | 49,630 | 2.37% | 15,462 | 0.74% | 886,085 | 42.30% | 2,094,714 |

== Analysis ==
Despite Illinois’ position within the core of reliable Republican states in the “System of 1896”, at the beginning of the 1920 presidential campaign former Progressive Illinois Republican Harold L. Ickes came out against Republican nominee Warren Harding and supported the Democratic nominee, Ohio Governor James Cox. Cox would visit the state on two occasions during his national fall campaign tour, once in September and once in October. In the first campaign, Cox claimed that Harding wanted to fund his campaign by imposing an onerous levy upon the coal dealers of Chicago, and said the Democrats were making every effort to win the state, despite it having been Charles Evans Hughes’ fifth-strongest nationwide in 1916. In the second, Cox criticized Harding's stand on the League of Nations, and argued that it would benefit American business and spiritual morals to enter therein.

At the end of the third week of October, another Illinois Republican leader in Morton D. Hull followed Ickes in deserting Harding and endorsing Cox, this time exclusively over the issue of the League of Nations.

== See also ==
- United States presidential elections in Illinois
