= Endorsements in the 1920 Democratic Party presidential primaries =

This is a list of endorsements for declared candidates in the Democratic primaries for the 1920 United States presidential election.

== Woodrow Wilson ==
List of Woodrow Wilson endorsements

U.S. executive branch officials

Current

U.S. senators

Current

- Edwin Johnson, U.S. Senator from South Dakota (1915-1921)

Former

U.S. representatives

Current
Former

Governors

Current
Former

Statewide officials

State legislators

Current
Former

Local officials

Party officials

Individuals

Organizations

Newspapers

== Alexander Palmer ==
List of Alexander Palmer endorsements

U.S. executive branch officials

Current

U.S. senators

Current
Former

U.S. representatives

Current
Former

- Bruce Sterling, U.S. Representative from PA-23 (1917-1919)

Governors

Current
Former

Statewide officials

State legislators

Current
Former

Local officials

Party officials

Individuals

Organizations

Newspapers

== Edward Edwards ==
List of Edward Edwards endorsements

U.S. executive branch officials

Current

U.S. senators

Current
Former

U.S. representatives

Current
Former

Governors

Current
Former

Statewide officials

State legislators

Current

- John Boylan, New York State Senator (1913-1922)

Former

Local officials

- Anton Cermak, alderman in Chicago, Illinois (1919-1922)

Party officials

Individuals

Organizations

Newspapers

== Herbert Hoover ==
List of Herbert Hoover endorsements

U.S. executive branch officials

Current

U.S. senators

Current

- James D. Phelan, U.S. Senator from California (1915-1921)

Former

U.S. representatives

Current
Former

Governors

Current
Former

- Oswald West, Governor of Oregon (1911-1915)

Statewide officials

State legislators

Current
Former

Local officials

Party officials

- William Flinn, Republican State Committeeman from Pennsylvania (1912) (Progressive)

Individuals

- Julius Barnes, industrialist and government official
- Edgar Rickard, mining engineer
- Frank Goodnow, President of Johns Hopkins University

Organizations

Newspapers
