= ABC TV (Australian TV channel) =

Australian public television network

- Logo used since 2021
- Type: Free-to-air television network Public broadcaster
- Country: Australia
- Broadcast area: National
- Network: ABC Television
- Headquarters: Sydney

Programming
- Language: English
- Picture format: 1080i HDTV (Note: Available on ABC TV HD.) (downscaled to 576i for the SDTV feed)

Ownership
- Owner: Australian Broadcasting Corporation
- Sister channels: ABC TV HD; ABC Kids; ABC Family; ABC Entertains; ABC News; ABC Australia

History
- Launched: 5 November 1956; 70 years ago
- Former names: ABC National Television Service/ABC National Television/ABC-TV (5 November 1956 – 8 February 2008); ABC1 (8 February 2008 – 20 July 2014)

Links
- Website: www.abc.net.au/tv

Availability

Terrestrial
- ABN Sydney (DVB-T): 545/547/673/675 @ 12 (226.5 MHz)
- ABV Melbourne (DVB-T): 561/563/689/691 @ 12 (226.5 MHz)
- ABQ Brisbane (DVB-T): 577/579/705/707 @ 12 (226.5 MHz)
- ABS Adelaide (DVB-T): 593 @ 12 (226.5 MHz)
- ABW Perth/Mandurah (DVB-T): 737 @ 12 (226.5 MHz)
- ABT Hobart (DVB-T): 625 @ 8 (191.5 MHz)
- ABD Darwin (DVB-T): 641 @ 30 (543.5 MHz)
- Freeview ABC (virtual): 2/20/21

Streaming media
- ABC: ABC TV live stream on iview

ABC TV, formerly known as ABC1, is an Australian national public television network. It is owned and operated by the Australian Broadcasting Corporation, and is the flagship ABC Television network. The headquarters of the ABC TV channel and the ABC are in Ultimo, an inner-city suburb of Sydney.

The network began operating on 5 November 1956 as the ABC National Television Service, starting in Sydney, followed by Melbourne, with other stations being established in state capitals and regional areas in the following years. In the 1960s and 1970s, the network was also referred to as ABC National Television, or ABC Television. Until the introduction of digital television in 2001, the network was the only domestic television service broadcast by the ABC. On 8 February 2008, the channel was renamed ABC1, before being rebranded as ABC TV on 20 July 2014.

As of 2025, ABC TV is the third-rated television network and primary channel in Australia, behind the Seven Network and Nine Network but ahead of Network 10 and SBS TV.

== History ==
=== Origins ===
In 1953, the Television Act was passed, providing the initial regulatory framework for both ABC Television and commercial television networks under the ABC. The ABC's 1956 Annual Report stated that it aimed to create a "television service as truly national in character as its resources will permit".

The first ABC station was launched in Sydney, ABN-2, followed by ABV-2 in Melbourne, in time to cover the 1956 Summer Olympics in Melbourne, with the first television broadcast was inaugurated by prime minister Robert Menzies on 5 November 1956 at the Gore Hill studios in Sydney, followed two weeks later by transmission in Melbourne. A purpose-built television studio opened in Sydney on 29 January 1958, replacing the temporary sound studios used the service's inception. In the same year, technical equipment was also moved to permanent locations, while main transmitters were introduced to Melbourne and Sydney in 1957 and 1958 respectively. Services had expanded to all of the other states by the end of June 1960.

=== 1960s to the 1990s ===
Direct television relays between Sydney, Melbourne and Canberra were established in 1961, and in 1963, using microwave transmission as a temporary measure, television programs from Adelaide were viewed simultaneously across the four eastern capitals. Videotape equipment, allowing the sharing of footage with much greater ease and speed, was installed in each state capital by 1962.

Teletext services were introduced to the television service in 1983 to allow hearing impaired viewers access to closed captions. Nationwide, successor to This Day Tonight, was replaced in turn by a new, hour-long, national news program called The National. Having proved unsuccessful, it reverted to a state ABC News bulletin at 7:00pm, with a state-based edition of The 7.30 Report following afterwards. Lateline and Media Watch also launched in the 1980s.

=== 2000s ===
In 2001, a new logo was launched, featuring a modification to a three-dimensional metallic design, to celebrate the introduction of digital terrestrial television in Australia, when digital television was introduced to most of the network's coverage area on 1 January 2001, soon followed by the gradual introduction of widescreen and high definition programming. On 1 August 2001 on channel 21, ABC Kids was launched, becoming the first digital multi-channel service, with Fly TV following soon afterwards, but both had limited availability, and were closed in a round of funding cuts in 2003.

==== 2005–2008: Change of status and rebranding ====
On 7 March 2005, a new digital channel called ABC2 (now ABC Family) was launched, according to then Director of ABC New Media and Digital Services Lynley Marshall, "like the 'younger sibling' of ABC main channel", running on a very low budget. A large amount of its schedule was dedicated to regional issues, with programs such as Australia Wide, Landline and Stateline.

At midday on 8 February 2008 ABC TV was re-branded as ABC1, with the standard-definition redirect channel moved from LCN22 to LCN2. Further cementing the change in identity was the change from the slogan There's more to television to It begins with 1. After concerns in some sections of the media that the 43-year-old Lissajous curve brand was to disappear completely, ABC management reaffirmed that it would remain in use by the corporation.

==== 2010–present: Rebranding and renaming ====
In May 2010, ABC1 announced its first channel controller, BBC Worldwide's Brendan Dahill. He commenced in August 2010.

As part of the digital television transition in Australia, the ABC gradually ended its transmissions on analogue TV which commenced in July 2010 and concluded on 10 December 2013 when the transmitters switched off in Melbourne and remaining remote areas.

On 6 February 2011, ABC1 launched its new branding via idents featuring a range of channel personalities, including the face of the channel Adam Hills, with the new tagline "Think Entertainment", designed by design agency The Lab. The network's famous Lissajous curve logo was modified by adding a "1".

ABC1 channel controller Brendan Dahill moved to ABC1 / ABC2 Head of Programming on 1 January 2014.

On 20 July 2014, ABC1 reverted to just "ABC" and introduced new idents featuring the 1975 Lissajous curve logo being drawn by itself of videos of people doing activities (taken from ABC Open's video library). Then, the words "It's (Insert Words Here)'s ABC" (the words change depending on the ident) fade in on the left side of the logo. The words then change to "#OurABC", which was the network's then-new slogan. The "#OurABC" slogan at the end of each ident was changed to "Yours" on 31 December 2017. The 1975 logo was reinstated in February 2019.

== Programming ==
The ABC is required by charter to meet certain programming obligations. Although it has a strong focus on news and current affairs, it also presents documentaries and educational programs, drama, light entertainment comedy and variety, and sports. Unlike the other Australian commercial television networks, it doesn't do deals with international branches of major American film and television studios, but instead airs a few programs from different companies, mainly from British, Canadian and Western European and Asian companies and some American companies. It has aired programs from BBC, Channel 5, Teletoon, YTV, Nelvana, Treehouse, Nickelodeon/Paramount, The Walt Disney Company/Disney Channel/Disney XD, NBCUniversal, DreamWorks Animation/DreamWorks Classics, PBS/WGBH, Decode Entertainment, Cinar, Cookie Jar, Ragdoll Productions, DiC, Sesame Workshop, The Jim Henson Company, 20th Television/FX Networks, Toei Animation and HiT Entertainment among various others. Nowadays it airs shows from Warner Bros. and its subsidiaries Warner Bros. Animation and Cartoon Network/Warner Bros. Discovery Global Networks and Sony Pictures Television.

=== News, analysis and investigations ===
ABC News, broadcast on the ABC, is a national news service produced by the News, Analysis & Investigations division of the Australian Broadcasting Corporation.

A number of bulletins and updates are shown throughout the day, which include the flagship state-based evening bulletins of ABC News at 7.00pm, focused on local, national and international news relevant to their entire respective state or territory. In addition, News Breakfast is broadcast each morning from 6.00am, and it is also shown on the ABC News channel, ABC News at Noon, a national edition of ABC News, is broadcast at noon live from the ABC's studios in Ultimo, Sydney. News updates are presented nationally only on both the ABC News channel and ABC throughout the day; however evening updates are shown in most states by their respective presenters.

Other flagship programs, which include the weeknightly 7.30 and the weekly Four Corners, Australian Story and Foreign Correspondent, are broadcast in prime-time. Landline, Insiders, Offsiders, Media Watch cover rural, political and business, sport and media affairs respectively.

=== Sport ===
ABC Television, Radio, News and Online cover many sports. It was the first broadcaster of the W-League (football), a partnership that remained from 2008 to 2017. From October 2019 for the first time, ABC Television was the official free-to-air partner of the A-League, as well as returning to the W-League, in a deal which included the Socceroos and Matildas and lasted for two years. ABC TV broadcast one A-League game a weekend live, and has had the right to broadcast delayed coverage of some finals matches and the Grand Final. The deal included 14 rounds of the W-League's 2019/20 Season and the whole W-League 2020 Finals Series, and many games played by the Socceroos and Matildas. However, from August 2021, both the A-League and W-League begin a five-year deal with ViacomCBS giving broadcast rights to Network 10.

== Availability ==
ABC varies depending on state and territory in terms of what 7:00pm news bulletin, state-edition of 7.30, and some promotions, are shown. National programming is often interrupted to show state election coverage. Each state and territory's individual station is based on that of its capital city, meaning that in the state of Victoria, all programmes originate from either Melbourne or Sydney, where the remainder of programmes are broadcast from. ABC is broadcast nationally via ABC Television transmitters, in a standard definition format.

=== ABC HD ===
ABC HD logo

The ABC HD multi-channel was launched on 1 January 2008. The service provided a 720p simulcast of ABN Sydney nationwide. The channel was closed on 22 July 2010 and its HD channel space was re-purposed for the ABC News channel. ABC HD was relaunched on 6 December 2016 as a simulcast of ABC, localised to each state, reducing the news channel to SD.

Following the government's decision to remove SD primary channel limitations, ABC Director of Television Richard Finlayson announced in November 2015 that the ABC would recommence simulcasting in high definition in June 2016. However, the launch date was later pushed back to an indefinite time in late 2016 due to technical reasons, with the launch date finally announced as 6 December 2016. However, in contrast to its past, ABC HD provided region-specific simulcasting, not just a nationwide simulcast of ABN Sydney. Additionally, the channel broadcast in MPEG-4 format as opposed to the traditional MPEG-2 format. As a result of the channel's revival, the ABC News channel was reduced to a standard definition broadcast.

=== ABC iview ===
Most ABC TV programs are also available on demand via ABC iview, a video-on-demand and catch-up TV service which became available on 24 July 2008.

== Logo history ==
In the early years, ABC TV had been using Lissajous curves with its initials, ABC TV, inside it as fillers in-between programmes. At the time, lissajous patterns (a waveform used by oscilloscopes) were used by broadcast engineers to help tune both radio and television frequencies, before more sophisticated electronic tools had been invented. The 3:1 ratio was chosen because the 2:1 ratio was being used by the University of Sydney at the time. Space engineer Doug Rickard claims to have suggested and demonstrated the waveform in the early 1960s and wrote in his memoir that he had been paid for it. A staff competition was conducted in July 1963 to create a new logo for the ABC. Bill Kennard, who was senior graphic designer at the ABC between 1956 and 1974, came up with the winning design, praised as "crisp, functional and of its age", for which he was paid £25. On 1 May 1964, the logo was officially adopted by the ABC.

The logo has been adapted and modified several times over the years,

- On 19 October 1974, due to the start of colour television test transmissions, ABC TV's logo was modified to a thickened variant and it was also changed to a crossover design.
- On 26 January 1988, to celebrate the Australian Bicentenary on Australia Day, the idents were updated.
- In 1996, ABC TV began using idents which feature a modified version of the 1963 logo design being drawn in the air by various people; these idents feature the slogan, It's your ABC.
- On 1 January 2001, ABC TV's logo was again modified, but this time to a giant 3D silver design which turns from a giant silver ring morphs into the logo. The logo was also radically modified to lose the "over and under" design.
- On 1 January 2002, to celebrate seventy years of the Australian Broadcasting Corporation, ABC-TV's logo changed back to the "over and under" design, however it still kept the 3D silver design. The channel's idents featured elements – fire, leaf and ice, the silver ring that morphs into the ABC logo, and the slogan "Everyone's ABC". These idents were also carried to ABC Asia Pacific.
- In 2003, the channel's idents were modified to feature everyday Australians.
- On 19 December 2005, the channel's idents were revamped featuring a slightly modified ABC logo transforming into a television.
- On 8 February 2008, the channel was renamed as ABC1 with its logo (adopting a blue colour theme) updated concurrently with ABC2 (in a yellow theme). In addition to this, the slogan There's more to Television was rebadged to It begins with 1. After concerns in some sections of the media that the 43-year-old Lissajous curve logo was to disappear completely, ABC management reaffirmed that it would remain in use by the corporation. Aside this, the idents were revamped to feature a version of that of 2003, but with animations.
- In 2007, the ABC Television Corporation announced that the squiggle logo would not be removed, but kept it secret until 8 February 2008.
- On 6 February 2011, the channel was rebranded with new idents and a new on-air logo, with a new slogan "Think Entertainment".
- On 20 July 2014, ABC1 rebranded back to ABC TV, with a new on-air presentation; it restores the 1975 Lissajous curve logo with a new slogan "#ourABC", and with different gradient colours.
- On 4 February 2019, the ABC was re-branded with a new on-air presentation, which included the Lissajous curve.

=== Branding gallery ===
5 November 1956 – 1960

1 July 1963 – 18 October 1974

19 October 1974 – 31 December 2000; 4 February 2019 – 31 December 2020

20 July 2014 – 4 February 2019

1 January 2021 – present

== Slogans ==
- 1965–1970s: Australian Broadcasting Commission, National Television Service.
- 1971: This is National Television ABC. (based on "A Shade of Brass")
- 1972–1975: This is ABC Television, The Good Looking Australian. (based on "A Shade of Brass")
- 1972–1973: Around Australia, You're in Tune with the National Network – ABC Television.
- 1974: This is ABC National Television.
- Christmas 1974: Wishing You a Merry Christmas From ABC National Television.
- 1975 (Jan–Feb): Come on Home to ABC.
- 1975: Come to Colour on ABC National Television.
- 1977: You're at Home with ABC.
- 1978–82: ABC-TV.
- Summer 1980/81: Summer '80.
- Summer 1981/82: ABC Summer.
- 1982–83: ABC – Your National Network.
- 1982: The Games Station.
- 1985–94: You're Watching ABC, Your Australian Network.
- 1986: This is ABC Television, Coming to You via Domestic Satellite Throughout Australia.
- 1988–96: Natural Textures of Australia.
- 1990–95: Man-Made Textures.
- 1992: 8 Cents a Day.
- 1993–2000: It's Your ABC.
- 1994: Seeing is Believing on Your ABC.
- 1 January 1999 – January 2002: You're Watching ABC, Your Australian Network – First in Australia.
- 2002–2005: Everyone's ABC.
- 2005–2008: There's More to Television.
- 2008–2011: It Begins with 1.
- Summer 2010/11: Colour Your Summer with ABC.
- 2011–2014: Think Entertainment.
- Summer 2011/12: Happy Summer.
- 20 July 2014 – 31 December 2017: #ourABC.
- 31 December 2017 – present: Yours.
- December 2016 – present: ABC: Original. (secondary slogan)

== See also ==
- Children's programming on ABC Television
