= John Rickards =

John Rickards may refer to:

- John Rickards (author) (born 1978), British crime writer
- John E. Rickards (1848–1927), politician in Montana
- John Rickards (priest) (1844–1921), priest in South Africa
