= Rackard =

Rackard is a surname. Notable people with the surname include:

- Billy Rackard (1930–2009), Irish sportsperson, brother of Nicky and Bobby
- Bobby Rackard (1927–1996), Irish sportsperson
- Nicky Rackard (1922–1976), Irish sportsperson
  - Nicky Rackard Cup

== See also ==
- Rickard
