= Rickards =

Rickards is an English surname. It is closely related to the surnames Rickard and Richards.

Rickards may refer to:

- Ashley Rickards, American actor
- Barrie Rickards, British paleontologist
- Clint Rickards, New Zealand police officer
- Edwin Alfred Rickards, British architect
- Emily Bett Rickards, Canadian actress
- Esther Rickards (1893–1977), British surgeon and politician
- Sir George Kettilby Rickards
- George William Rickards, British politician
- Harry Rickards, British-born comedian
- James Rickards, American lawyer and financial commentator
- Jocelyn Rickards (1924–2005), Australian costume designer
- John Rickards (author), British crime-writer
- John Rickards (priest), South African Anglican priest
- John E. Rickards, American politician
- Ken Rickards (cricketer), West-Indian cricketer
- Samuel Rickards, British clergyman
- Scott Rickards, British footballer
- Tudor Rickards, Welsh academic and business author
