= Doug Rickard =

Doug Rickard may refer to:

- Doug Rickard (engineer)
- Doug Rickard (photographer)
