= Reuben Rickard =

American politician

- Born: August 20, 1841; England
- Died: February 24, 1896 (aged 54); Western Australia
- Occupation: Mining engineer
- Spouse: Mary Elizabeth Humphreys
- Children: Thomas Rickard, Leontine Rickard, Edgar Rickard

Reuben Rickard (August 20, 1841 – February 24, 1896) was a mining engineer He married Mary Elizabeth Humphreys October 3, 1863. They had six children, three of whom died young. who served as President of the Town Board of Trustees in Berkeley, California from 1891 to 1893, and again for about one month during 1895.

Rickard was born on August 20, 1841, in England. Rickard was hired by John Taylor and Sons of London to oversee their mining and metallurgical operations in Pontgibaud, France in the 1860s. In 1875, the Rickard family emigrated to the United States as Reuben had been hired to manage the operations of the Richmond Mining Company in Eureka, Nevada. He worked there six years before taking on another job inspecting mines for English investors throughout the western U.S. and Mexico. The family finally settled in Berkeley, California on July 24, 1882.

Reuben's wife died of tuberculosis on March 28, 1895, in Central City, Colorado.

Reuben Rickard died February 24, 1896, of acute diarrhoea on board the steamer Bothwell Castle which was bound from Geraldton to Fremantle in Western Australia where he was inspecting a mining project.

Reuben was survived by three children, Thomas, Edgar and Leontine. Thomas Rickard also served as President of the Town Board of Trustees from 1903 to 1909. Edgar Rickard was a close lifelong friend of President Herbert Hoover. Leontine Rickard married William Bowditch Fisher on March 11, 1896, in Berkeley. Reuben had a brother Alfred Rickard who was also a mining engineer based in Denver, Colorado, and a nephew Thomas Arthur Rickard who was a prominent writer on the subject of mining.
