= Reckard =

Reckard is a surname. Notable people with the surname include:

- Frank Reckard (born 1952), American guitarist
- Marshall Reckard (1901–1957), American mechanic and politician

== See also ==
- Rickard
