= 1920 New Jersey Republican presidential primary =

1920 New Jersey Republican presidential primaries
- April 27, 1920
- Presidential delegate primary

28 Republican National Convention delegates
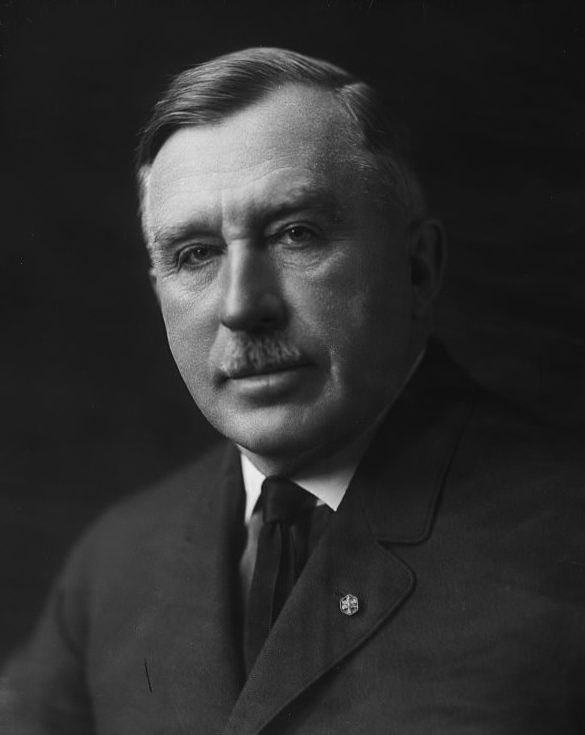

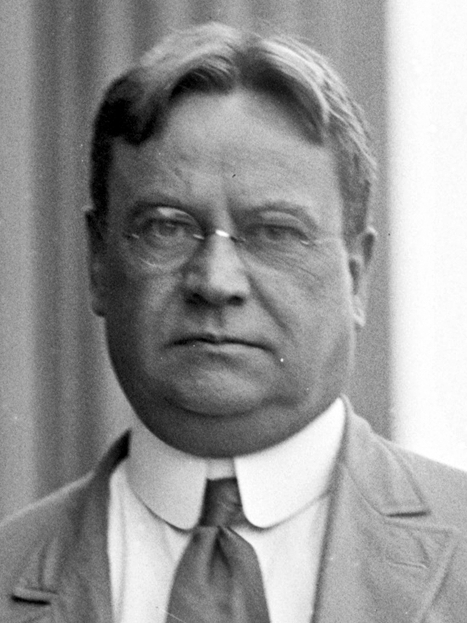

Candidate	Leonard Wood	Hiram Johnson	Uncommitted
Home state	New Hampshire	California
Delegate count	16	9	3
Popular vote	294,917	160,996	161,787
Percentage	47.7%	26.0%	26.1%
- Presidential preference primary (non-binding)

No Republican National Convention delegates
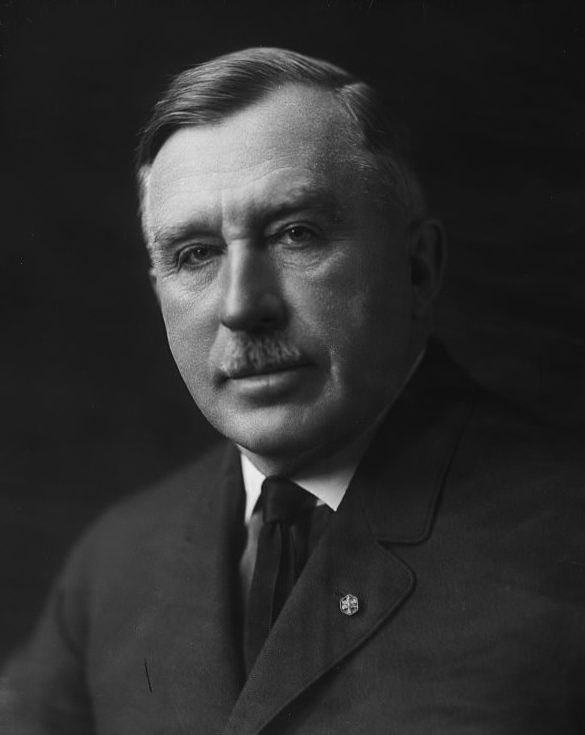

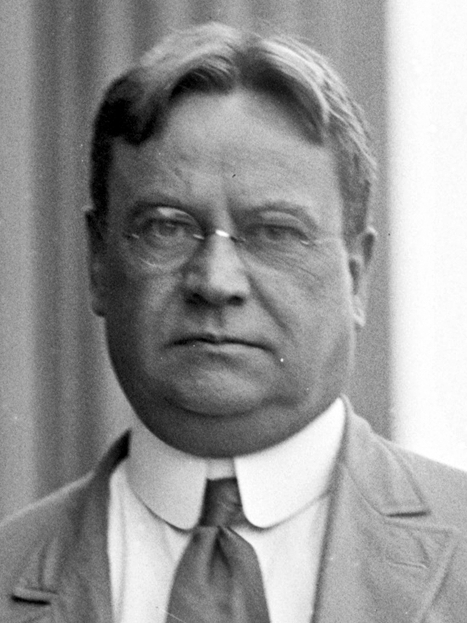
Candidate	Leonard Wood	Hiram Johnson
Home state	New Hampshire	California
Popular vote	52,909	51,685
Percentage	50.2%	49.0%

The 1920 New Jersey Republican presidential primary was held on April 27, 1920, in New Jersey as one of the Republican Party's statewide nomination contests ahead of the 1920 United States presidential election. Delegates to the 1920 Republican National Convention were elected from each of the state's congressional districts, along with four delegates at-large.

The majority of the elected delegates were committed to supporting Leonard Wood, with a large minority supporting Hiram Johnson.

In the non-binding presidential preference primary held simultaneously, Wood narrowly defeated Johnson.

== Background ==
=== Procedure ===
New Jersey was allocated 28 total delegates to the 1920 Republican National Convention. Four delegates and four alternate delegates were elected at-large, and two delegates were elected from each of the state's twelve congressional districts, along with two alternates. Delegates were given the choice of pledging support to a particular candidate or running as uncommitted delegates.

The state also held a presidential preference primary, which was non-binding, although two district delegate candidates campaigned on supporting the winner of the statewide primary.

== Campaign ==
Warren G. Harding withdrew from the New Jersey ballot on April 2. Campaign manager Harry Daugherty cited insufficient funds and the high expense of contesting the state.

Wood fielded delegate candidates in all twelve districts, while Johnson only ran candidates in nine districts. Sylvester L. Corrothers and Isaac H. Nuttor ran as unpledged anti-organization delegates at-large to protest the Republicans' exclusion of any Black candidates from their delegate slate.

== Endorsements ==
Leonard Wood

Federal executive branch officials

- John W. Griggs, former U.S. Attorney General and governor of New Jersey (ran for delegate at-large)

State executive branch officials

- Edward C. Stokes, former governor of New Jersey and chair of the New Jersey Republican Party (ran for delegate at-large)

U.S. representatives

- Richard W. Parker, U.S. representative from Newark (ran for district delegate)

State legislators

- William H. Bright, state senator for Cape May County (ran for district delegate)
- Everett Colby, former state senator for Essex County and Progressive nominee for governor in 1913 (ran for district delegate)
- Austen Colgate, former state senator for Essex County and candidate for governor in 1916 (ran for district delegate)
- Edward D. Duffield, businessman and former state assemblyman from Essex County (ran for district delegate)
- Ogden H. Hammond, former state assemblyman from Somerset County (ran for district delegate)
- William Nelson Runyon, state senator for Union County and former acting governor (ran for delegate at-large)

Local officials

- Henry Meade Doremus, former mayor of Newark (ran for district delegate)
- Thomas Lynch Raymond, former mayor of Newark (ran for delegate at-large)
- Francis F. Patterson Jr., Camden County clerk and candidate for U.S. House of Representatives (ran for district delegate)
Uncommitted

U.S. senators

- Walter E. Edge, U.S. senator since 1919 and former governor (ran for delegate at-large)
- Joseph S. Frelinghuysen Sr., U.S. senator since 1917 (ran for delegate at-large)

State legislators

- Emerson Lewis Richards, former state senator for Atlantic County (ran for district delegate)

Local officials

- Arthur F. Foran, former mayor of Flemington (ran for district delegate)

Individuals

- Walter G. Alexander, Orange physician and candidate for General Assembly in 1912 and 1919 (ran for district delegate)

== Results ==
1920 New Jersey Republican presidential preference primary
Party	Candidate	Votes	%
Republican	Leonard Wood	52,909	50.15%
Republican	Hiram Johnson	51,685	48.99%
Republican	Herbert Hoover	900	0.85%
Total votes		105,494	100.00%

=== Delegate primary results ===
Candidate	Delegate candidates		Delegates		Aggregate votes	
Candidate	Statewide	District	Total	Of total (%)	Total	Of total (%)
Leonard Wood	4	24	16	57.14	294,917	47.66
Uncommitted	4	9 (Note: Includes Edward C. Brennan and William R. Ransom, who ran in the eleventh district on a pledge to support the winner of the non-binding primary election.)	3	10.71	161,787	26.15
Hiram Johnson	2	18	9	32.14	160,996	26.0
Warren G. Harding	0	2	0	0	436	0.01
Total	10	53	28	100.0	618,782	100.00
Registered voters, and turnout						

==== By district ====
1920 New Jersey Republican primary
Contest	Delegates and popular vote				
Contest	Uncommitted	Wood	Johnson	Harding	Total
At-large	2; 140,480 (33.7%)	2; 188,062 (45.2%)	87,525 (21.0%)	–	416,067
1st district	1; 7,881 (47.7%)	1; 8,657 (52.3%)	–	–	16,538
2nd district	10,318 (49.7%)	2; 10,442 (50.3%)	–	–	20,760
3rd district	–	9,789 (49.1%)	2; 10,154 (50.9%)	–	19,943
4th district	3,108 (22.1%)	2; 10,973 (77.9%)	–	–	14,081
5th district	–	2; 12,703 (59.7%)	8,585 (40.3%)	–	21,288
6th district	–	2; 9,377 (52.9%)	8,365 (47.1%)	–	17,742
7th district	–	9,951 (44.0%)	2; 12,690 (56.0%)	–	22,641
8th district	–	1; 9,780 (49.8%)	1; 9,855 (50.2%)	–	19,635
9th district	742 (5.4%)	2; 7,289 (52.7%)	5,791 (41.9%)	–	13,822
10th district	–	2; 10,926 (58.4%)	7,793 (41.6%)	–	18,719
11th district	444 (6.3%)	1,935 (27.4%)	2; 4,689 (66.3%)	–	7,068
12th district	–	4,493 (42.9%)	2; 5,549 (53.0%)	436 (4.2%)	10,478
Total	3 161,787 (26.1%)	16 294,917 (47.7%)	9 160,996 (26.0%)	436 (0.01%)	618,782

==== By candidate ====
District primary results
Contest	Pledge	Candidate	Votes	%
At-large	Uncommitted	Joseph S. Frelinghuysen	61,419	14.76
At-large	Uncommitted	Walter E. Edge	60,955	14.65
At-large	Wood	Edward C. Stokes	51,995	12.50
At-large	Wood	William N. Runyon	47,393	11.39
At-large	Wood	Thomas L. Raymond	45,726	10.99
At-large	Johnson	Mumford L. Ballard	43,892	10.55
At-large	Johnson	Thomas R. Layden	43,633	10.49
At-large	Wood	John W. Griggs	42,948	10.32
At-large	Uncommitted	Isaac H. Nuttor	9,644	2.32
At-large	Uncommitted	Sylvester L. Corrothers	8,462	2.03
1st district	Wood	Francis F. Patterson Jr.	8,657	52.35
1st district	Uncommitted	Edward L. Sturgess	7,881	47.65
2nd district	Wood	William H. Bright	5,409	26.05
2nd district	Wood	William W. Worrell	5,033	24.24
2nd district	Uncommitted	Emerson L. Richards	4,267	20.55
2nd district	Uncommitted	F. Wallis Armstrong	3,336	16.07
2nd district	Uncommitted	James A. Lightfoot	2,715	13.08
3rd district	Johnson	William M. Thompson	5,207	26.11
3rd district	Johnson	William H. Kline	4,947	24.81
3rd district	Wood	Ford Garretson	3,933	19.72
3rd district	Wood	Lewis S. Thompson	3,796	19.03
3rd district	Wood	David C. Rose	2,060	10.33
4th district	Uncommitted	William P. Howe	4,065	28.87
4th district	Uncommitted	Arthur F. Foran	3,723	26.44
4th district	Uncommitted	Walter Firth Jr.	3,185	22.62
4th district	Wood	Ogden H. Hammond	3,108	22.07
5th district	Wood	J. Mortimer Townley	6,416	30.14
5th district	Wood	Charles W. Ennis	6,287	29.53
5th district	Johnson	W. Edmen Clum	4,300	20.20
5th district	Johnson	Allan Trimble	4,285	20.13
6th district	Wood	Daniel E. Pomeroy	4,691	26.44
6th district	Wood	Nathan H. Hart	4,686	26.41
6th district	Johnson	William H. MacKay	4,274	24.09
6th district	Johnson	Charles H. Wagner	4,091	23.06
7th district	Johnson	Joseph W. Hardy	6,408	28.30
7th district	Johnson	Colin R. Wise	6,282	27.75
7th district	Wood	William V. Watson	5,079	22.43
7th district	Wood	William I. Lewis	4,872	21.52
8th district	Johnson	Arthur S. Archibold	5,132	26.14
8th district	Wood	Henry M. Doremus	5,029	25.61
8th district	Wood	William H. Marzahl	4,751	24.20
8th district	Johnson	William A. Taber	4,723	24.05
9th district	Wood	Austen Colgate	3,723	26.94
9th district	Wood	Richard Wayne Parker	3,566	25.80
9th district	Johnson	Adrian G. Chamberlain	2,898	20.97
9th district	Johnson	Thomas W. Smith	2,893	20.93
9th district	Uncommitted	Walter G. Alexander	742	5.37
10th district	Wood	Edward D. Duffield	4,666	24.93
10th district	Wood	William L. Glorieux	4,005	21.40
10th district	Johnson	John Mitchell	3,917	20.93
10th district	Johnson	Joseph Budd	3,876	20.71
10th district	Wood	Everett Colby	2,255	12.05
11th district	Johnson	William P. Verdon	2,384	33.73
11th district	Johnson	Philip Melcher	2,305	32.61
11th district	Wood	Harlan Besson	992	14.04
11th district	Wood	William G. Weller	943	13.34
11th district	Uncommitted (Note: Brennan and Ransom were pledged to support the winner of the preference primary, which was ultimately Wood.)	Edward C. Brennan	263	3.72
11th district	Uncommitted	William R. Ransom	181	2.56
12th district	Johnson	Richard Doherty	2,812	26.84
12th district	Johnson	Thomas S. Vieron	2,737	26.12
12th district	Wood	Robert Carey	2,247	21.44
12th district	Wood	Howard R. Cruse	2,246	21.44
12th district	Harding	George C. Warren Jr.	251	2.40
12th district	Harding	Charles Lee Meyers	185	1.77
