= 1920 Republican Party presidential primaries =

Selection of Republican US presidential candidate

- March 9 to June 5, 1920

940 delegates to the 1920 Republican National Convention 471 (majority) votes needed to win
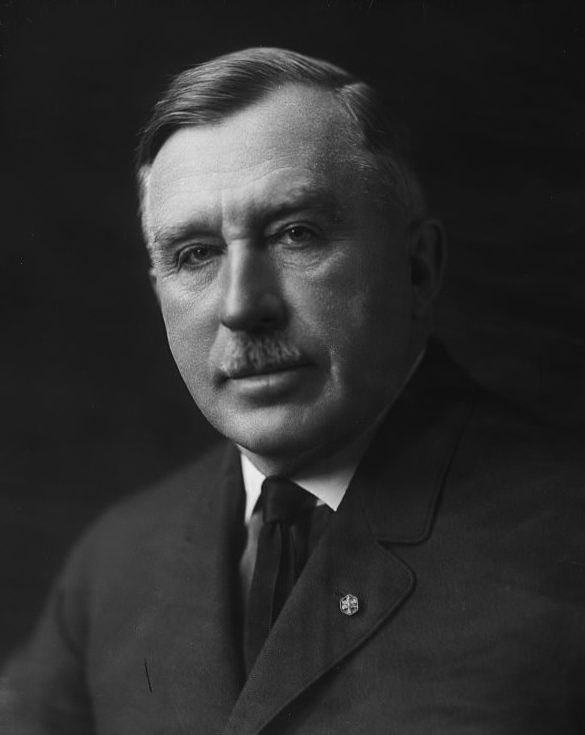

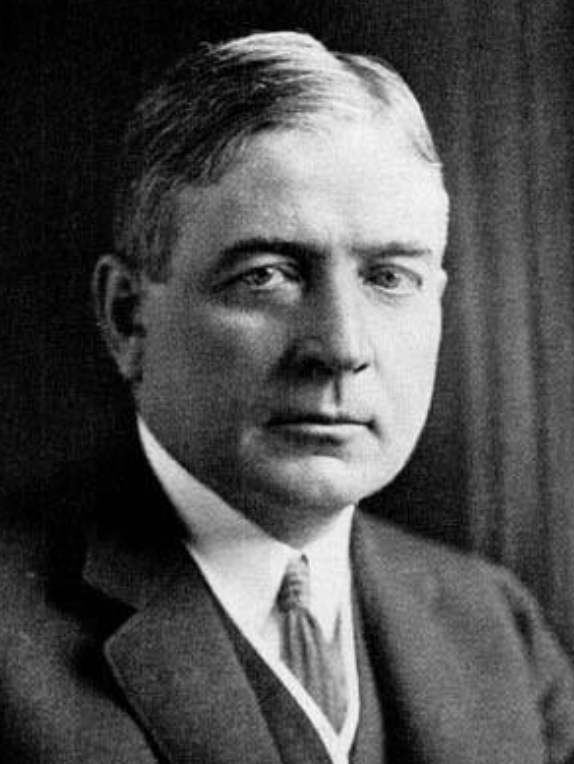

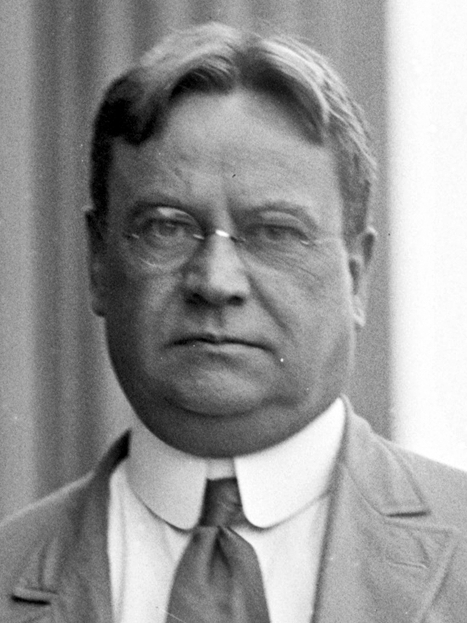
Candidate	Leonard Wood	Frank Orren Lowden	Hiram Johnson
Home state	Massachusetts	Illinois	California
Delegate count	287.5	211.5	133.5
Contests won	8	1	7
Popular vote	710,863	389,127	965,651
Percentage	22.3%	12.2%	30.3%
- Wood Lowden Johnson; Harding Poindexter Various (Note: Favorite sons received the support of New York (Nicholas Murray Butler), Pennsylvania (William Cameron Sproul), Massachusetts (Calvin Coolidge), Delaware (T. Coleman du Pont), Wisconsin (Robert M. La Follette), West Virginia (Howard Sutherland), and North Carolina (Jeter Pritchard). In the popular vote, the New York and Massachusetts primaries were won by unpledged delegates, while the non-binding preference primary in Pennsylvania was won by the unknown Edward R. Wood, the only candidate on the ballot.)
Previous Republican nominee
Charles Evans Hughes
Republican nominee
Warren G. Harding

From March 9 to June 5, 1920, voters of the Republican Party elected delegates to the 1920 Republican National Convention for the purpose of choosing the party's nominee for president in the 1920 election.

The delegates were largely contested between Governor Hiram Johnson of California, a progressive who had been the running mate of Theodore Roosevelt eight years prior; General Leonard Wood, one of Roosevelt's closest friends; and Frank O. Lowden, the Governor of Illinois.

After a series of primary elections and caucuses, no candidate had emerged with a clear majority of the delegates. At the 1920 Republican National Convention, held from June 8 to June 12, in Chicago, Illinois, the delegations of the leading candidates deadlocked and Warren G. Harding was nominated as a dark horse candidate, although he had only won a few delegates entering the convention.

== Background ==
=== 1912 and 1916 elections ===
In 1912, the Republican Party was split. Former President Theodore Roosevelt challenged incumbent William Howard Taft for the nomination and, when it was denied at the 1912 Republican National Convention, bolted to form the Progressive Party. With Republicans (who had won eight of the previous eleven presidential elections) split, Woodrow Wilson won the race with a plurality of the popular vote and a large majority in the electoral college.

In 1916, the Republican Party nominated Associate Justice of the United States Charles Evans Hughes, a respected jurist and former Governor of New York, as one who could appeal to both Progressives and Republicans alike. Though Hughes was able to avoid disaster when Roosevelt declined to run on the Progressive ticket, he fell narrowly short of defeating President Wilson, who significantly improved on his vote from 1912. The campaign was dominated by two wars: the Mexican Revolution and World War I. Responding to Republican calls for military preparedness, Wilson used the slogan "He kept us out of war" to emphasize the maintenance of U.S. neutrality.

=== World War I ===
In January 1917, the Zimmermann telegram from Germany to Mexico was intercepted by British intelligence. In the telegram, German diplomat Arthur Zimmermann offered to restore much of the territory Mexico had lost in the Mexican–American War in the event the United States entered the war. Zimmermann, hoping to threaten the United States, admitted the telegram's authenticity in a March speech to the Reichstag. Public outcry ensued, and Wilson requested a declaration of a "war to end all wars" against Germany. Congress granted the request on April 6, 1917, shortly after Wilson began his second term and nearly three years after the war had begun.

Major General Frederick Funston, Wilson's first choice to command U.S. forces, had died in February. Several Republican Party leaders called on Wilson to appoint Leonard Wood, a close friend and advisor of Theodore Roosevelt and long-time preparedness advocate. However, Wilson chose John J. Pershing, a Republican who had previously gained fame as commander of the Pancho Villa Expedition, at the behest of Secretary of War Newton D. Baker. After a yearlong mobilization effort, Pershing and U.S. troops began major combat operations during summer 1918, near the war's end. The United States was able to claim victory with relatively few casualties. Pershing's fame was further elevated to that of a war hero. He was widely considered a candidate for the presidency, though some Republicans considered him too close to the Wilson administration.

=== Wilson's Fourteen Points ===
On January 8, 1918, Wilson delivered a speech to Congress specifying his war aims. Those idealist aims, which came to be known as Wilson's Fourteen Points, sought to expand his progressive domestic program abroad. The Fourteen Points were to serve as the basis for negotiation of the Treaty of Versailles. Among the most controversial points were his proposals to remove economic barriers between nations, guarantee national self-determination, and establish a League of Nations, an international body designed to prevent future wars.

=== 1918 midterm elections and death of Roosevelt ===
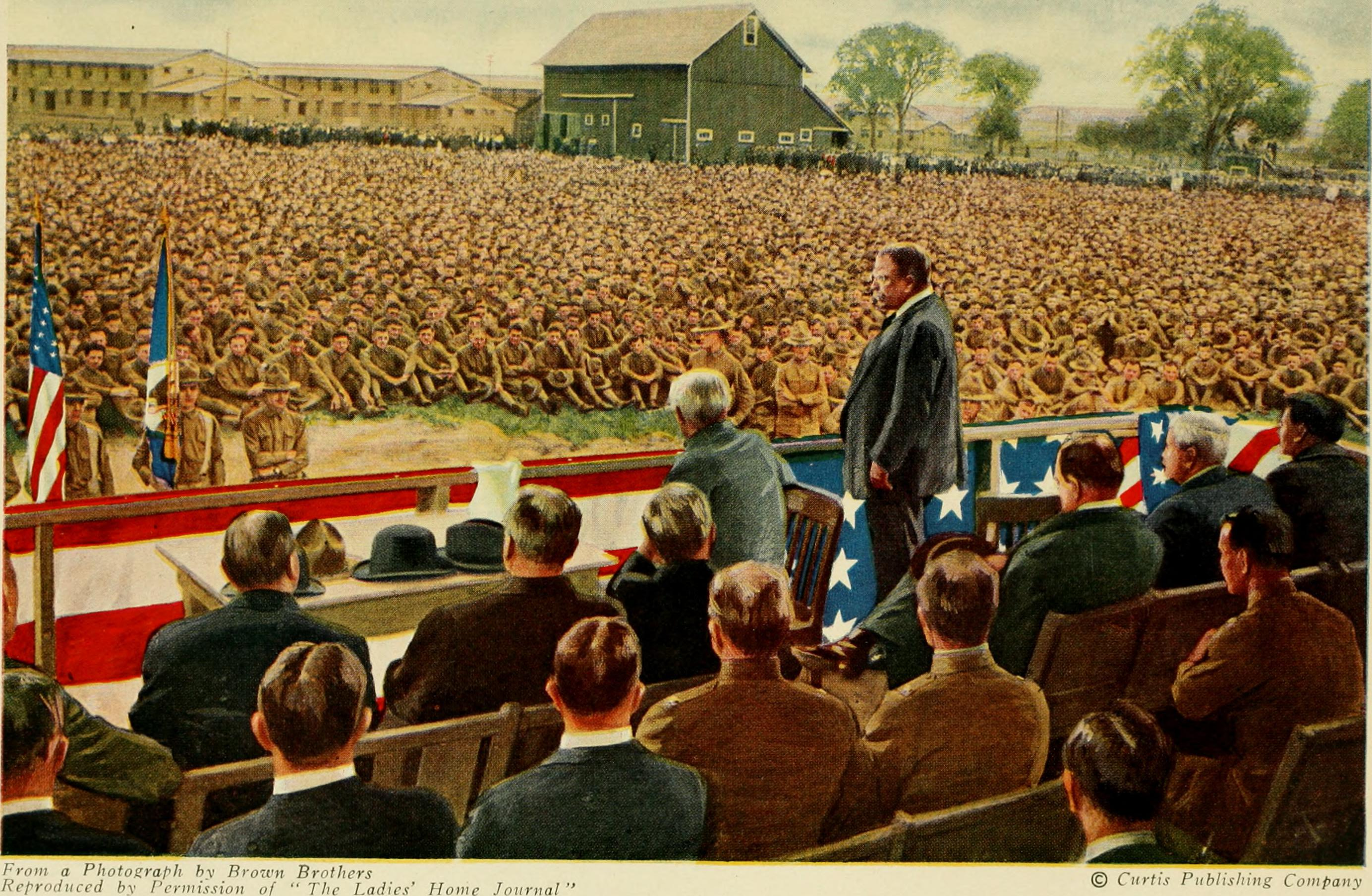
Theodore Roosevelt spent his final years as a critic of Wilsonian idealism. Before his unexpected death, he was a leading candidate for the 1920 nomination.

Criticism of the Fourteen Points as idealistic or an abrogation of national sovereignty was a major focus of the Republican campaign of 1918. The leading critic was former President Theodore Roosevelt, by now the early favorite for the 1920 presidential nomination. Though Roosevelt himself had privately predicted 1916 was his last campaign, his public profile remained strong and his attacks on Wilson made him a natural contender. In early March 1918, he declared, "By George, if they'll take me, they'll have to take me without a single modification of the things that I have always stood for!" He met with Republican strategists during the summer, though he declined to run for Governor of New York, privately citing the need to preserve his strength for the 1920 campaign. However, Roosevelt's had physical condition deteriorated rapidly after his son Quentin was killed in action in July, and he died at the age of sixty on January 6, 1919. His final written work, a criticism of the proposed League of Nations and defense of "Americanism," was published in Metropolitan Magazine shortly after his death.

With the war in its final weeks, Americans elected the Republican Party to control of both houses of Congress. In the state elections, Republicans performed well in the West, gaining five governors' offices west of the Mississippi River. Their major loss came in Roosevelt's home of New York, where Al Smith gained the governor's office. With Roosevelt dead, the leading candidates for the nomination were his friend, General Wood, and Senator Warren G. Harding of Ohio. On February 9, 1919, Wood delivered a memorial address for Roosevelt, in which he echoed the late President's criticisms of the League of Nations and raised his own national profile as a political orator. "Either unconsciously or with a master hand," the Philadelphia Public Ledger reported, Wood had made a "bold and convincing bid for the Republican nomination." Wood soon replaced Roosevelt as a regular contributor to Metropolitan magazine and returned to command as head of the Army Central Department in Chicago.

=== Paris Peace Conference ===
Having lost command of Congress, Wilson left to personally represent the United States at the Paris Peace Conference in January 1919; he was the first President to leave for Europe while still in office. He brought with him only one Republican and chose, rather than a Senator or Representative, the ex-diplomat Henry White. Wilson's decision to double down on idealism and foreign intervention in the face of his rejection at the polls incensed Republican leadership (led by Henry Cabot Lodge), improved the party's political optimism for 1920, and promised to make foreign policy the defining issue of the upcoming campaign.

=== Labor and racial unrest ===
The success of the Bolshevik Revolution and the threat of revolution in Germany, Austria, and Italy bred hope and fear for revolution in the United States, where the Socialist Party had made modest gains. With Wilson in Europe and Roosevelt dead, the country was leaderless, as were both of its major political parties.

Labor strikes in 1919, especially in New York and Seattle, startled conservatives. Further strikes rocked the textile industry, the clothing trade, and street railcars. The 1919 Boston police strike skyrocketed Massachusetts governor Calvin Coolidge to national prominence when, amid rioting and looting, he sternly declared there was no right "to strike against the public safety." Frank O. Lowden of Illinois also came to prominence for his handling of the Chicago race riot of 1919, facing off with mayor William Hale Thompson in a game of brinksmanship.

Leonard Wood made his personal contribution to the counterrevolution by leading his troops to West Virginia in April, where they headed off armed miners without resorting to violence. In September, Wood led troops to suppress a race riot in Omaha, brought on by the lynching of a black civilian. Again, he restored the peace without further bloodshed. His most controversial political act came in October, when he attempted to mediate the general steel strike of 1919. The mediation ultimately failed, but Wood imposed terms on the strikers and capital with pleased neither. "I am now," he declared to Henry Stimson, "practically the Mayor of Omaha and Gary, with prospects of additions to the crop."

=== Pre-primary maneuvering ===
Between his domestic deployments in 1919, Wood traveled the country speaking on behalf of veterans' organizations. Everywhere, he was received as if he were already the Republican nominee. He hired John T. King, a former associate of Roosevelt's from Bridgeport, Connecticut, as a political manager. Others in the party's Old Guard, however, saw Wood as too independent and preferred Harding. By November 1919, Wood's political-military campaign had been a rousing success. "Unless the situation changes," wrote William Allen White, "no other candidate will be mentioned in the Republican Convention. But the situation of course in this country will have to be desperate if it does not change." As the popular front-runner, Wood was vulnerable both from fatigue and the attention of other candidates, led first by Harding.

== Candidates ==
=== Nominee ===
Candidate	Experience	Home state	Campaign	Popular vote	Contests won	Running mate
Warren G. Harding	U.S. Senator from Ohio (1915–1921) Lieutenant Governor of Ohio (1904–1906)	Ohio	(Campaign • Positions); Announced: December 17, 1919; Secured nomination: June 12, 1920		[data missing]	Calvin Coolidge

=== Withdrew during convention ===
Candidate	Experience	Home state	Campaign	Delegates on first ballot	Contests won
Hiram Johnson	U.S. Senator from California (1917–1945) Governor of California (1911–1917)	California	Defeated at convention: June 12, 1920		[data missing]
Leonard Wood	Chief of Staff of the United States Army (1910–1914) Governor of Moro Province (1911–1917) Governor of Cuba (1911–1917)	Massachusetts	Defeated at convention: June 12, 1920		[data missing]
Frank O. Lowden	Governor of Illinois (1917–1921) U.S. Representative from IL-13 (1906–1911)	Illinois	Defeated at convention: June 12, 1920	—	[data missing]
Miles Poindexter	U.S. Senator from Washington (1911–1923) U.S. Representative from WA-3 (1909–1911)	Washington	Defeated at convention: June 12, 1920	—	[data missing]
Herbert Hoover	Director of the U.S. Food Administration (1917–1918) Chairman of the Belgian Relief (1914–1917)	California	Defeated at convention: June 12, 1920	—	[data missing]

=== Did not run ===
- Former Associate Justice of the United States Supreme Court Charles Evans Hughes from New York
- General of the Armies John J. Pershing from Missouri
- 26th President of the United States Theodore Roosevelt from New York (died January 6, 1919)

=== Favorite sons ===
The following candidates stood for nomination in their home states for the purpose of controlling their delegate slate at the convention. They did not receive the first-ballot support of delegates in more than two other states or territories.

- President of Columbia University Nicholas Murray Butler from New York
- Governor Calvin Coolidge of Massachusetts
- Businessman T. Coleman du Pont of Delaware
- Senator Robert M. La Follette of Wisconsin
- Judge Jeter Pritchard from North Carolina
- Governor William C. Sproul of Pennsylvania
- Senator Howard Sutherland of West Virginia
- Retired businessman Edward R. Wood from Pennsylvania (Note: Wood was the sole named candidate on the non-binding Republican preference vote in Pennsylvania, though he was not expected to have the support of any of the state's twelve at-large delegates; all fifteen candidates pledged their support to Governor William Cameron Sproul.)

== Primary campaign ==
Though he was among the stronger potential candidates, Harding intended from the start to run a low-key campaign that would position himself as the alternative to the chaotic open field left by Roosevelt's death. As he told campaign manager Frank Scobey, "It has been my own judgment not to go at it too vigorously in order to reach the high tide of our publicity movement until late in the campaign. Some enterprises make such a booming start that they fizzle out later on."

There were at least ten serious contenders at the onset of the campaign: Wood, Harding, Lowden, Coolidge, California governor Hiram Johnson, Howard Sutherland, Pennsylvania governor William Cameron Sproul, Miles Poindexter, Herbert Hoover, and Nicholas Murray Butler. Only Wood, who had the support of major corporations, and Lowden, who acquired a fortune through his marriage to heiress Florence Pullman, were well-funded enough to run a public national campaign; other candidates sought mainly to influence delegate selection behind closed doors or compete in small-state primaries. However, the Lowden campaign declined to pursue any binding delegate elections and instead sought to persuade uncommitted and uninstructed delegates after their election.

=== Ohio: April 27 ===
One of the key contests came late in April in Harding's home state of Ohio, which he would absolutely need to carry to stand any chance at the nomination. Wood's supporters in the state, led by William C. Procter, surprised Harding by entering the general's name for the primary rather than letting Harding's status as a favorite son go unchallenged. Procter offered to withdraw Wood's name on the condition that he be declared the second choice of the Ohio delegates, but Harding flatly refused.

Wood hit the state with a barnstorming tour, dressed in his military uniform and echoing Roosevelt's progressivism. Harding declined to confront Wood directly, instead delivering speeches on the Republican mantra of "Americanism" as a contrast to internationalist Wilsonian idealism:

"[We must] make sure our own house is in perfect order before we attempt the miracle of Old World stabilization. Call it selfishness or nationality if you will, I think it an inspiration to patriotic devotion: to safeguard America first, to stabilize America first, to prosper America first, to think of America first, to exalt America first to live for and revere America first."

Harding was so confident in winning Ohio that he left the state early to campaign in Indiana. However, the result was a narrow victory over Wood, closer than anyone expected.

=== Indiana: May 4 ===
The Indiana primary was among the most sharply contested of the campaign, featuring four serious candidates in Wood, Lowden, Harding, and Hiram Johnson. Harding had been convinced to enter the primary by Senator Harry New, one of his closest allies in the Senate.

Harding finished fourth with only nine percent of the vote. Having been humiliated in the only two primaries he contested outside his home state, Harding strongly considered withdrawing to focus on his re-election to the Senate. Instead, his wife convinced him to remain in the race and leverage his status as the Ohio candidate, as others had done before him, and win the nomination on a later ballot. His strategy now focused on becoming the "available man" in the event of a deadlock, securing secondary commitments from delegates who favored Wood, Lowden, or Johnson.

== Schedule and results ==
Date	Total pledged delegates	Contest and total popular vote	Delegates won and popular vote (Note: This should not be taken as a finalized list of results. While a significant amount of research was done, there were a number of States which also elected Delegates at the Congressional level who were not always bound by the instructions of the State convention, and these are not yet reflected in the table. Many states also held primaries for the delegate positions, and these on occasion were where slates or candidates pledge to a certain candidate might be elected; however, as these elections allowed for a single person to vote for multiple candidates, as many as the number of positions being filled, it is difficult to determine how many people actually voted in these primaries. For this reason, while the results of some are in the table, except in those rare cases where a total vote is provided, they are not included in the popular vote summaries at the bottom of the table.)							
Date	Total pledged delegates	Contest and total popular vote	Leonard Wood	Frank Lowden	Hiram Johnson	Warren Harding	Miles Poindexter	Herbert Hoover	Others	Unpledged
January 29	8	Florida convention	–	–	–	–	–	–	–	8
February 5	11	South Carolina convention	–	–	–	–	–	–	–	11
February 11	20	Oklahoma convention	–	–	–	–	–	–	–	20
February 23	12	Louisiana convention	–	–	–	–	–	–	–	12
February 28	6	Arizona convention	6 (Note: Although the Arizona delegation was formally uninstructed, five of the six delegations were supportive of Wood and the delegates were expected to adopt the unit rule. The Arizona convention also endorsed Wood.)	–	–	–	–	–	–	–
March 3	26	Kentucky convention	–	–	–	–	–	–	–	26
March 3	22	North Carolina convention	–	–	–	–	–	–	22 (Note: All twenty-two delegates were pledged to support Jeter Pritchard on the first ballot.)	–
March 9	8	New Hampshire primary 16,027	8; 9,878 (61.63%)	–	2,010 (12.54%)	–	–	–	4,434 (27.67%)	
March 16	10	North Dakota primary 31,825	987 (3.10%)	265 (0.83%)	10; 30,573 (96.07%)	–	–	–	–	–
March 17	15	Virginia convention	–	15	–	–	–	–	–	–
March 20	24	Minnesota convention	12	–	–	–	–	–	–	12
March 23	10	South Dakota primary 85,691	10; 31,265 (36.49%)	26,981 (31.49%)	26,301 (30.69%)	–	1,144 (1.34%)	–	–	–
March 23	14	Connecticut convention	–	–	–	–	–	–	–	14
March 25	12	Maine convention	–	–	–	–	–	–	–	12
March 26	6	New Mexico convention	6	–	–	–	–	–	–	–
March 31	20	Kansas convention	–	–	–	–	–	–	–	20
April 5	30	Michigan primary 408,918	112,568 (27.53%)	62,418 (15.26%)	30; 156,939 (38.38%)	–	2,662 (0.65%)	52,503 (12.84%)	–	
April 5	10	Rhode Island convention	–	–	–	–	–	–	–	10
April 6	17	Georgia convention	6	11 (Note: The situation in Georgia was a mess, with a fight between Wood and Lowden men to control the State convention, eventually leading to a split and two competing delegations being sent to Chicago. The Lowden won most of the contested seats when it came to a vote at Chicago, but only (15) of the (17) delegate "seats" are accounted for.)	–	–	–	–	–	–
April 6	88	New York primary ?	–	–	–	–	–	–	–	88
April 6	26	Wisconsin primary 30,099	4,505 (14.97%)	921 (3.06%)	2,413 (8.02%)	–	–	3,910 (12.99%)	2,474 (Note: Includes 15,826 votes for Robert M. LaFollette and 373 votes for Irvine Lenroot.) (60.9%)	–
April 6	26	Wisconsin primary 30,099	20,626 (?%)	–	–	–	–	–	26 (Note: All twenty-six delegates were pledged to support Robert LaFollette.); 117,647 (Note: All 117,647 votes were for delegates pledged to support Robert LaFollette.) (?%)	70,747 (Note: All 70,747 votes were for an unpledged delegate slate headed by Emanuel Philipp.) (?%)
April 13	50 (of 58)	Illinois primary 463,797	156,719 (33.79%)	236,082 (50.90%)	64,201 (13.84%)	–	–	3,401 (0.73%)	2,674 (Note: Includes 1,026 Write-In votes for Mayor William Thompson at (2.21%).) (0.58%)	–
April 13	50 (of 58)	Illinois primary 463,797	–	35 ? (?%)	1 ? (?%)	–	–	–	14 (Note: Represents an Uninstructed Delegates led by Chicago Mayor William Thompson) ? (?%)	–
April 14	20	Tennessee convention	17	–	–	–	–	–	–	3 (Note: Uninstructed Delegates won out in the Sixth (partially) and Eighth Congressional District conventions.)
April 20	6	Delaware convention	–	–	–	–	–	–	–	6
April 20	16	Nebraska primary 136,647	4; 42,385 (31.02%)	–	12; 63,161 (46.22%)	–	–	–	31,101 (Note: Includes 27,669 votes for John Pershing and 1,698 votes for William Simpson.) (22.76%)	–
April 21	26	Iowa convention	–	26	–	–	–	–	–	–
April 23	8	Montana primary 40,140	6,804 (16.95%)	6,503 (16.20%)	8; 21,034 (52.40%)	723 (1.80%)	–	5,076 (12.65%)	–	–
April 24	6	Nevada convention	–	–	–	–	–	–	–	6
April 27	35	Massachusetts primary ?	2; 32,745 (?%)	–	–	–	–	31,540 (?%)	33; 75,616 (?%)	–
April 27	28	New Jersey primary 105,701	52,909 (50.06%)	–	51,685 (48.90%)	40 (0.04%)	–	900 (0.85%)	167 (Note: Includes 80 votes for Philander Knox, 17 votes for Calvin Coolidge, and 41 Walter Edge.)	–
April 27	28	New Jersey primary 105,701	16; 60,262 (?%)	–	9; 42,833 (?%)	–	–	–	3; 52,611 (Note: Represents Delegates who ran as Uninstructed.)	–
April 27	48	Ohio primary 259,072	108,565 (41.91%)	–	16,783 (6.48%)	123,257 (47.58%)	–	10,467 (4.04%)	–	–
April 27	48	Ohio primary 259,072	9; 107,449 (?%)	–	–	39; 131,190 (?%)	–	–	–	–
April 27	14	Washington convention	–	–	–	–	14	–	–	–
April 28	13	Arkansas convention	–	–	–	–	–	–	–	13
April 28	8	Idaho convention	–	–	–	–	–	–	–	8
May 3	16	Maryland primary 28,783	16; 18,666 (64.85%)	–	10,117 (35.15%)	–	–	–	–	–
May 3	8	Utah convention	–	–	–	–	–	–	–	8
May 4	26	California primary 580,431	–	–	26; 370,819 (63.89%)	–	–	209,612 (36.11%)	–	–
May 4	0 (Note: While the Indiana Delegates would be normally instructed by the results of the Presidential Primary, a majority of the vote was required to do so.) (of 30)	Indiana primary 225,957	85,708 (37.93%)	39,627 (17.54%)	79,840 (35.33%)	20,782 (9.20%)	–	–	–	–
May 5	12	Mississippi convention	–	–	–	–	–	–	–	12
May 5	36	Missouri convention	–	–	–	–	–	–	–	36
May 6	12	Colorado convention	–	–	–	–	–	–	–	12
May 10	8	Illinois convention	–	6.4 (Note: While only ascribed 8 Delegate Votes to their At-Large group, ten were named so as to include Mayor William Thompson and one of his allies; the result was that each delegate had 4/5ths of a vote rather than a full vote.)	–	–	–	–	–	1.6
May 10	6	Wyoming convention	–	–	–	–	–	–	–	6
May 12	30	Indiana convention	10	–	4	–	–	–	–	16
May 18	76	Pennsylvania primary 279,472	3,878 (1.39%)	–	10,869 (3.89%)	–	–	2,825 (1.01%)	260,644 (Note: Includes 257,841 votes for Edward R. Wood, 1,256 write-in votes for William Cameron Sproul, and 1,989 write-In votes for Philander Knox.) (93.26%)	-
May 18	76	Pennsylvania primary 279,472	–	–	–	–	–	–	–	76
May 18	8	Vermont primary 5,229	8; 3,457 (66.11%)	29 (0.56%)	402 (7.69%)	–	–	564 (10.79%)	442 (Note: Includes 354 votes for William Grant Webster, 335 votes for Calvin Coolidge, 37 write-In votes for Charles Evan Hughes, 12 write-in votes for Henry Cabot Lodge, and 6 write-in votes for Philander Knox.) (14.9%)	-
May 20	14	Alabama convention	–	–	–	–	–	–	–	14
May 21	10	Oregon primary 120,101	43,770 (36.44%)	15,581 (12.97%)	10; 46,163 (38.44%)	–	36 (0.03%)	14,557 (12.12%)	–	–
May 25	23	Texas convention	–	–	–	–	–	–	–	23
May 25	16	West Virginia primary 119,747	53,490 (44.67%)	–	–	–	–	–	16 (Note: All sixteen delegates were pledged to support Howard Sutherland.); 66,257 (Note: Includes 61,371 votes for Howard Sutherland and 4,129 votes for William Grant Webster.) (55.3%)	–
June 5	0 (of 22)	North Carolina primary 20,978	5,603 (26.71%)	–	15,375 (73.29%)	–	–	–	–	–
Total 984; 2,838,868			115 761,783 (26.83%)	93.4 388,407 (13.68%)	110 968,685 (34.12%)	39 144,802 (5.10%)	14 3,842 (0.14%)	303,815 (10.70%)	0 (0.00%)	517.6 328,633 (11.58%)
First Ballot			287.5	211.5	133.5	65.5	20	5.5	7	4

== Post-primary maneuvering ==
=== Kenyon Committee report ===
On the eve of the convention, no man had secured enough support for the nomination. However, Wood and Lowden suffered a major blow when the Senate investigation into campaign expenditures was published. The subcommittee chaired by William S. Kenyon revealed massive spending by both Wood and Lowden's campaigns, including two canceled checks from Lowden to Missouri delegates that could not be explained. Johnson was indirectly damaged by the investigation as well, since Wood and Lowden supporters blamed him for instigating it; the enmity between the front-runners appeared to ensure none could secure the others' support.

== See also ==
- 1920 Democratic Party presidential primaries
