= Thomas Rickard =

American politician

- Born: August 28, 1866; France
- Died: March 25, 1911 (aged 44)
- Occupation: Mining engineer
- Spouse: Alice Whitmore
- Children: 4
- Parent(s): Reuben Rickard, Mary E Humphereys

Thomas Rickard (1866–1911) was a mining engineer, an early resident of Berkeley, California, and served as the last President of the Town Board of Trustees from 1903 to 1909, before the new city charter went into effect, creating the office of Mayor.

Rickard was born in France on August 28, 1866, to Reuben Rickard and Mary E Humphreys. Both of his parents were English-born. He immigrated to the United States with his family in the 1875. In 1889 he married his wife Alice Whitmore. They had four children: Leontine (b. May 1889), Helen (b. June 1891), Donald (b. August 1894), and Thomas, Jr. (b. January 1899).

Rickard had a cousin whose name was also Thomas, but regularly used his middle initial "A" (for Arthur). Thomas A. Rickard was a prominent writer on the subject of mining, who, in 1896, was appointed by the Governor to the position of State Geologist of Colorado. He served in that position until 1901.

Rickard graduated from the University of California in 1887, with a degree in mining engineering. From 1901 until his death, he served as vice president of the San Francisco mining firm of Harron, Rickard and McCone. He also served as a trustee of the California Institute for the Deaf and Blind, located in Berkeley.

Rickard's father Reuben Rickard also served as President of the Town Board of Trustees in Berkeley from 1891 to 1893 and again for about a month in 1895. He was also a mining engineer, having worked throughout the western United States. Thomas' brother Edgar Rickard was the editor of a mining newspaper in London and a close acquaintance of Herbert Hoover.

Thomas Rickard died on March 25, 1911.
