= Thomas Arthur Rickard =

- Born: August 29, 1864; Crotone, Italy
- Died: August 15, 1953 (aged 88); Oak Bay, British Columbia, Canada
- Occupation: Mining Engineer
- Spouse: Marguerite Lydia Rickard
- Children: Thomas Jr. (1901–1919); John (1904–1979)
- Parent(s): Thomas Rickard (1834-1916); Octavia Rachel Forbes (1837-1879)

T. A. Rickard (1864–1953), formally known as Thomas Arthur Rickard, was born on 29 August 1864 in Italy. Rickard's parents were British, and he became a mining engineer practising in the United States, Europe and Australia. He was also a publisher and author on mine engineering subjects.

== Biography ==
=== Family and education ===
Thomas Arthur Rickard was born in Crotone, Italy, the son of Thomas Rickard, a Cornish mining engineer. His grandfather was a Cornish miner, Captain James Rickard. His cousin Tom Rickard was mayor of Berkeley, California at the time of the 1906 San Francisco earthquake and fire. He was educated in Russia and England. In 1882 Rickard entered the Royal School of Mines, London from which he graduated in 1885.

=== Career ===
- 1885 Assayer, British mining firm, Idaho Springs, Colorado
- 1886 Assistant Manager, California Gold Mining Co., Colorado
- 1887 Manager, Union Gold Mine, San Andreas, Calaveras County, California
- 1889-1891 Consultant investigating mines in England and Australia
- 1891 In charge, Silver/Lead/Gold mines, French Alps/Isere district
- 1892-1893 Investigating mines in Western U.S.A.
- 1894 Manager, Enterprise Mine, Colorado
- 1895-1901 State Geologist, Colorado - appointed by Governor McIntyre and re-appointed by the next two governors
- 1897-1898 Consultant investigating mines in Australia and Canada and other work.
- 1903 Editor-in-chief, Engineering and Mining Journal, New York
  - In 1903 W.E. Ford published an article in the American Journal of Science naming a new mineral Rickardite after Rickard.
- 1905 purchased Mining and Scientific Press, San Francisco
- 1906-1909 Editor, Mining and Scientific Press, San Francisco
- 1909-1915 Founding Editor, Mining Magazine, London
- 1915-1922 Editor, Mining and Scientific Press, San Francisco
- 1922-1925 contributing editor, Engineering and Mining Journal, following the amalgamation of Mining and Scientific Press with that Journal
- 1925- Devoted his time to writing

=== Death ===
Rickard died in Oak Bay, British Columbia on 15 August 1953.

== Memberships and awards ==
- Institution of Mining and Metallurgy
  - 1896 elected Member
  - 1903-1909 Member of Council
  - 1932 awarded Gold Medal "in recognition of his services in the general advancement of mining engineering, with special reference to his contributions to technical and historical literature"
  - 1948 made Honorary Member "in recognition of his long and valued services to the mining and metallurgical profession and to the Institution"
- Canadian Institute of Mining and Metallurgy
  - Member
- University of Colorado
  - Honorary D.Sc.
- Royal School of Mines (Old Students’) Association
  - 1913 Founder
  - First Honorary Secretary
- American Institute of Mining and Metallurgical Engineers (AIME)
  - 1935 made Honorary Member

== Published works ==
- ‘Minerals which accompany gold and their bearing upon the richness of ore deposits’ Trans I.M.M., vol. 6, 1897-8
- ‘Cripple Creek goldfield’ Trans I.M.M., vol. 8, 1899-1900
- A guide to technical writing (1908)
- 'Across the San Juan Mountains', 1907, Dewey Publishing Company, San Francisco
- ‘Standardization of English in technical literature’ Trans I.M.M., vol. 19, 1909–10
- ‘Domes of Nova Scotia’ Trans I.M.M., vol. 21, 1911–12
- ‘Persistence of ore in depth’ Trans I.M.M., vol. 24, 1914–15
- ‘The later Argonauts‘ Trans I.M.M., vol. 36, 1926-7
- ‘Copper mining in Cyprus’ Trans I.M.M., vol. 39, 1929–30
- ‘Gold and silver as money metal’ Trans I.M.M., vol. 41, 1931-32
- Man and Metals (1932)
- A History of American Mining. New York & London: McGraw-Hill (1932)
- ‘The primitive smelting of copper and bronze’ Trans I.M.M., vol. 44, 1934–35
- ‘The primitive use of gold’ Trans I.M.M., vol. 44, 1934–35
- Retrospect (1937) - his autobiography
- "Indian Participation in the Gold Discoveries." British Columbia Historical Quarterly 2:1 (1938): 3-18
- The Romance of Mining. Toronto: Macmillan (1944)
- Historic Backgrounds of British Columbia. Vancouver: Wrigley Printing (1948)
- Autumn Leaves. Vancouver: Wrigley Printing (1948)
