= 1920 Democratic Party presidential primaries =

- March 9 to June 5, 1920

1,097 delegates to the Democratic National Convention 732 (two-thirds) votes needed to win
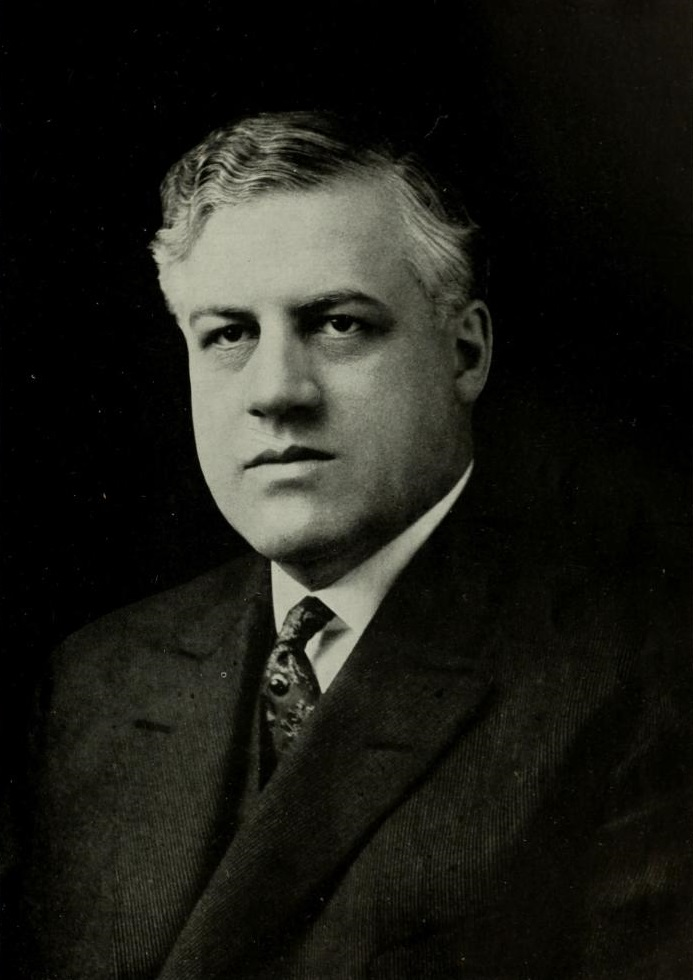

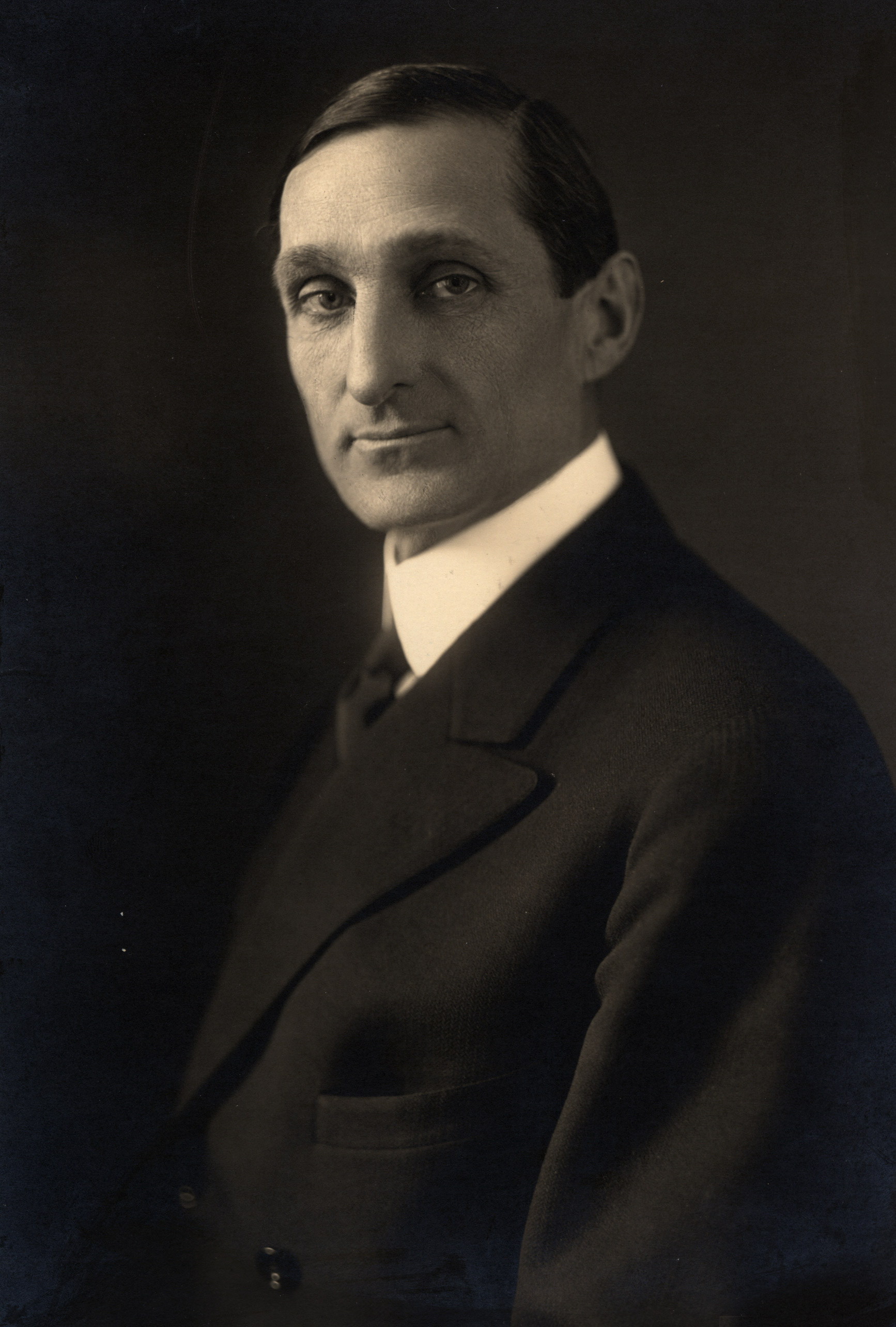

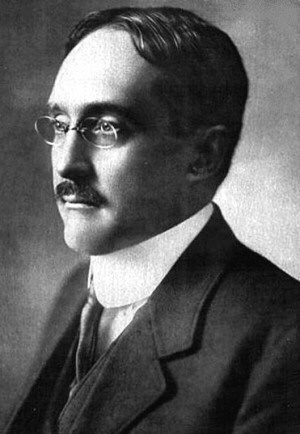

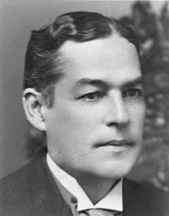

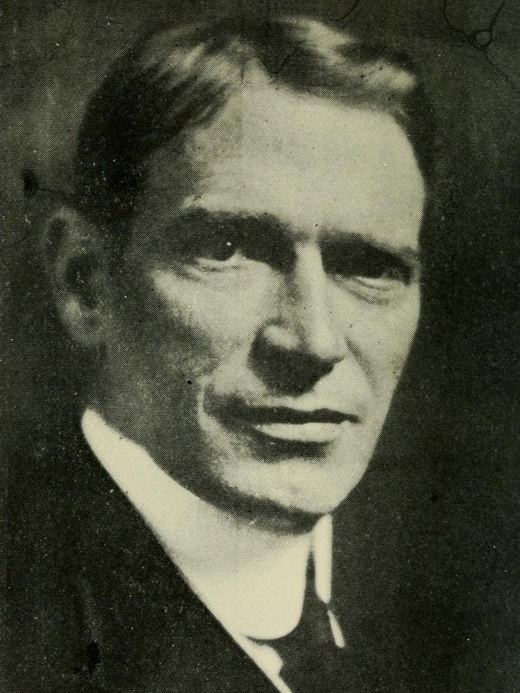
Candidate	A. Mitchell Palmer	James M. Cox	William G. McAdoo
Home state	Pennsylvania	Ohio	California
Delegate count	104 (256)	74 (134)	10 (266)
Contests won	2	2	1
Popular vote	140,010	86,194	74,987
Percentage	19.32%	11.89%	10.35%
Candidate	James Watson Gerard	Robert Latham Owen	Edward I. Edwards
Home state	New York	Oklahoma	New Jersey
Contests won	2	2	1
- McAdoo Palmer Cox Gerard; Owen Edwards Uncommitted Various (Note: Favorite sons received the support of the delegations of Nebraska (Gilbert Hitchcock), West Virginia (John W. Davis), Virginia (Carter Glass), New York (Al Smith), Mississippi (John Sharp Williams), Connecticut (Homer Stille Cummings), North Carolina (Furnifold Simmons), Iowa (Edwin T. Meredith), and Indiana(Thomas R. Marshall). Former Speaker of the House Champ Clark won the Louisiana delegation.) (Note: Favorite sons Gilbert Hitchcock and Thomas E. Watson won the Nebraska and Georgia primary votes, respectively. William Jennings Bryan won North Dakota and Herbert Hoover won Michigan. Massachusetts elected a slate of uncommitted delegates.)
Previous Democratic nominee
Woodrow Wilson
Democratic nominee
James M. Cox

From March 9 to June 5, 1920, voters of the Democratic Party elected delegates to the 1920 Democratic National Convention, for the purposing of choosing a nominee for president in the 1920 United States presidential election.

The race for delegates was made under a cloud of uncertainty because the party's two leading names, President Woodrow Wilson and three-time nominee William Jennings Bryan, withheld their intentions; both men privately hoped for the nomination, but neither's name was formally submitted before the voters or the convention as a candidate.

The delegate elections were inconclusive, with Attorney General A. Mitchell Palmer, Treasury Secretary William Gibbs McAdoo, and Ohio governor James A. Cox leading the candidate field. With no clear front-runner, many states withheld their delegates from any one candidate, instead sending an uncommitted slate of delegates or preferring to back a favorite son on the first ballot. At the convention, Cox was ultimately nominated on the forty-fourth ballot.

== Candidates ==
- Governor James M. Cox of Ohio
- Former United States Ambassador to Germany James Watson Gerard of New York
- Governor Edward I. Edwards of New Jersey
- Attorney General of the U.S. A. Mitchell Palmer from Pennsylvania
- Former United States Secretary of the Treasury William Gibbs McAdoo from California
- Senator Robert Latham Owen of Oklahoma

=== Not placed in nomination ===
- Former United States Secretary of State William Jennings Bryan of Nebraska
- House Minority Leader Champ Clark of Missouri
- President of the United States Woodrow Wilson of New Jersey

=== Favorite sons ===
- United States Secretary of Agriculture Edwin T. Meredith of Iowa
- Senator Carter Glass of Virginia
- Governor Al Smith of New York
- United States Senator Gilbert Hitchcock of Nebraska
- United States Ambassador to the United Kingdom John W. Davis of West Virginia
- United States Senator John Sharp Williams of Mississippi
- Party Chairman Homer Stille Cummings of Connecticut
- Senator Furnifold Simmons of North Carolina
- Vice President of the United States Thomas R. Marshall of Indiana

== Primary and caucus results ==
Date	Pledged delegates	Contest and total popular vote	Delegates won and popular vote (Note: This should not be taken as a finalized list of results. While a significant amount of research was done, there were a number of Delegates who were not bound by the instruction, or "pledged" to a candidate, and to simplify the data these delegates were considered "uncommitted". Many states also held primaries for delegate positions; as these elections allowed for a single person to vote for multiple delegate candidates, it is difficult to determine how many people actually voted in these primaries. For this reason, while such results may be found, they are not included in popular vote summaries.)							
Date	Pledged delegates	Contest and total popular vote	William Jennings Bryan	James M. Cox	Edward I. Edwards	Herbert Hoover	William Gibbs McAdoo	A. Mitchell Palmer	Other	Uncommitted
February 5	20	Oklahoma convention	–	–	–	–	–	–	20 (Note: All twenty Oklahoma delegates were committed to support Robert Latham Owen.)	–
February 27	6	Arizona convention	–	–	–	–	–	–	–	6
February 28	26	Iowa convention	–	–	–	–	–	–	–	26 (Note: Although the Iowa delegates were elected at the convention as uncommitted and uninstructed, they were later instructed to support favorite son Edwin T. Meredith by a state committee meeting ahead of the convention.)
March 9 (14)	6	Nevada convention	–	–	–	–	–	–	–	6
March 9 (14)	8	New Hampshire primary	–	–	–	–	–	–	–	8; 7,103 (100.0%)
March 16	10	North Dakota primary	340 (87.4%)	–	–	–	49 (12.6%)	–	–	10
March 23	10	South Dakota primary	–	–	–	–	–	–	10 (Note: All ten delegates were pledged to support James W. Gerard.); 6,612 (100.00%) (Note: 2,530 votes for James W. Gerard, 1,920 votes for James O. Monroe and 2,162 votes for other candidates.)	–
March 30	12	Maine convention	–	–	–	–	–	–	–	12
April 5	0 (of 30)	Michigan primary	17,954 (20.3%)	–	16,642 (18.8%)	24,006 (27.2%)	18,665 (21.1%)	11,187 (12.6%)	–	–
April 6 (146)	24	Minnesota convention	–	–	–	–	–	–	–	24
April 6 (146)	90	New York primary	–	–	–	–	–	–	–	90; 113,300 (100.0%)
April 6 (146)	6	Philippines convention	–	–	–	–	–	–	–	6
April 6 (146)	26	Wisconsin primary	–	76 (2.2%)	–	–	–	–	3,391 (97.8%)	26
April 8	24	North Carolina convention	–	–	–	–	–	–	24 (Note: All 24 delegates were instructed to support favorite son Furnifold McLendel Simmons.)	–
April 10	6	Puerto Rico convention	–	–	–	–	–	–	–	6
April 13	50 (of 58)	Illinois primary	1,968 (9.2%)	266 (1.2%)	6,933 (32.3%)	–	–	–	8,450 (39.4%) (Note: 931 votes for Woodrow Wilson, 548 votes for Champ Clark, 40 votes for J. Hamilton Lewis, and 6,931 votes for others.)	50
April 20 (44)	28	Georgia primary	–	–	–	–	–	28 (Note: Delegates to the state convention (which officially chose delegates and their instruction) were elected not on the popular vote but the county unit system. Palmer came second in the popular vote to Thomas E. Watson but won the most unit votes. Despite attempts by Watson and some Hoke Smith supporters to send an uninstructed delegation to the national convention, the Palmer delegation was seated by the credentials committee.); 48,460 (33.2%)	97,542 (66.8%) (Note: 51,974 votes for Thomas E. Watson and 45,568 votes for Hoke Smith.)	–
April 20 (44)	16	Nebraska primary	3,466 (6.2%)	–	–	–	–	–	16 (Note: All delegates were pledged to support favorite son Gilbert Hitchcock); 52,216 (93.8%) (Note: 37,452 for Gilbert Hitchcock, 13,179 for Robert G. Ross, and 1,585 votes for others)	–
April 22	36	Missouri convention	–	–	–	–	–	–	–	36
April 23	20	Kansas convention	–	–	–	–	–	–	–	20
April 23	8	Montana primary	–	–	–	–	–	–	2,994 (100.0%) (Note: No candidate filed for the Montana ballot and all votes were considered scattered.)	8
April 27 (112)	32	Massachusetts primary	–	–	–	–	–	–	–	36; 28,261 (100.0%)
April 27 (112)	28	New Jersey primary	64 (1.4%)	–	28; 4,163 (88.5%)	64 (1.4%)	180 (3.8%)	–	231 (4.9%) (Note: 149 votes for Woodrow Wilson, 55 votes for Hiram Johnson, and 27 votes for others.)	–
April 27 (112)	32	Ohio primary	971 (1.1%)	48; 85,838 (97.8%)	–	–	292 (0.3%)	282 (0.3%)	394 (0.4%)	–
April 28	6	Alaska Territory primary	–	–	–	–	–	–	–	6
May 3	16	Maryland convention	–	–	–	–	–	–	–	16
May 4 (52)	26	California primary	–	–	–	–	–	–	–	26; 23,861 (100.0%)
May 4 (52)	26	Kentucky convention	–	26	–	–	–	–	–	–
May 6 (24)	14	Connecticut primary	–	–	–	–	–	–	–	14
May 6 (24)	10	Rhode Island convention	–	–	–	–	–	–	–	10
May 10	8 (of 50)	Illinois convention	–	–	–	–	–	–	–	8
May 10	30	Michigan convention	–	–	–	–	–	–	–	30
May 10	6	Wyoming convention	–	–	–	–	–	–	–	6
May 11	24	Alabama primary	–	–	–	–	–	–	–	24
May 17 (76)	12	Colorado convention	–	–	–	–	–	–	–	12
May 17 (76)	14	Washington convention	–	–	–	–	–	–	–	14
May 18 (76)	76	Pennsylvania primary	285 (0.3%)	–	674 (0.6%)	–	26,875 (24.6%)	76; 80,356 (73.7%)	847 (0.8%) (Note: 129 votes for Woodrow Wilson and 718 for others.)	–
May 18 (76)	0 (of 8)	Vermont primary	26 (6.4%)	14 (3.5%)	58 (14.3%)	39 (9.6%)	137 (33.8%)	7 (1.7%)	124 (30.5%) (Note: 68 votes for Woodrow Wilson, 18 votes for Hiram Johnson, 16 votes for Champ Clark, 8 votes for Eugene Debs, 7 votes for Henry Ford, and 7 votes for Thomas R. Marshall.)	–
May 19	24	Virginia convention	–	–	–	–	–	–	–	24
May 20	30	Indiana convention	–	–	–	–	–	–	–	30
May 21	10	Oregon primary	–	–	–	–	10; 24,951 (98.6%)	–	361 (1.4%)	–
May 22	6	Territory of Hawaii primary	–	–	–	–	–	–	–	6
May 25 (62)	6	Delaware primary	–	–	–	–	–	–	–	6
May 25 (62)	40	Texas primary	–	–	–	–	–	–	–	40
May 25 (62)	16	West Virginia primary	–	–	–	–	–	–	–	16
May 26	18	South Carolina convention	–	–	–	–	–	–	–	18
June 1	18	Arkansas state committee	–	–	–	–	–	–	–	18
June 2	8	Vermont convention	–	–	–	–	–	–	–	8
June 3	20	Louisiana convention	–	–	–	–	–	–	–	20
June 3	6	New Mexico convention	–	–	–	–	–	–	–	6
June 8 (37)	24	Tennessee convention	–	–	–	–	–	–	–	24
June 8 (37)	12	Florida primary	–	–	–	–	–	–	–	12
June 10	11	Washington, D.C. primary	–	–	–	–	–	–	–	11
June 12	8	Utah convention	–	–	–	–	8 (Note: Although the Utah delegation was formally uninstructed, the convention passed a resolution endorsing McAdoo.)	–	–	–
June 15	8	Idaho convention	–	–	–	–	–	–	–	8
June 16	20	Mississippi convention	–	–	–	–	–	–	–	20

== See also ==
- Republican Party presidential primaries, 1920
- White primary
