= John Rickards (author) =

British crime writer (born 1978)

John Rickards (born 7 January 1978 in Barnet, North London, England) is a British crime writer who signed with Penguin Books at the age of 24.

== Life ==
Before becoming a novelist, Rickards worked as a freelance journalist in the shipping industry on a succession of magazines and news publications, often in an editorial role. He graduated from Cardiff University with a degree in Environmental Engineering, although he has never worked in the field.

He lives in Eastbourne, Sussex with his partner and son.

He also writes under the pseudonym SEAN CREGAN.

His novels feature an ex-FBI agent named Alex Rourke.

== Publications ==
=== Alex Rourke books ===
- Winter's End (2004)
- The Touch of Ghosts(2005)
- The Darkness Inside (2007)

=== Anthologies ===
- Dublin Noir (the short story "Wish", 2006)
- Fuck Noir (the short story "Twenty Dollar Future")
