= Edgar Rickard =

American mining engineer

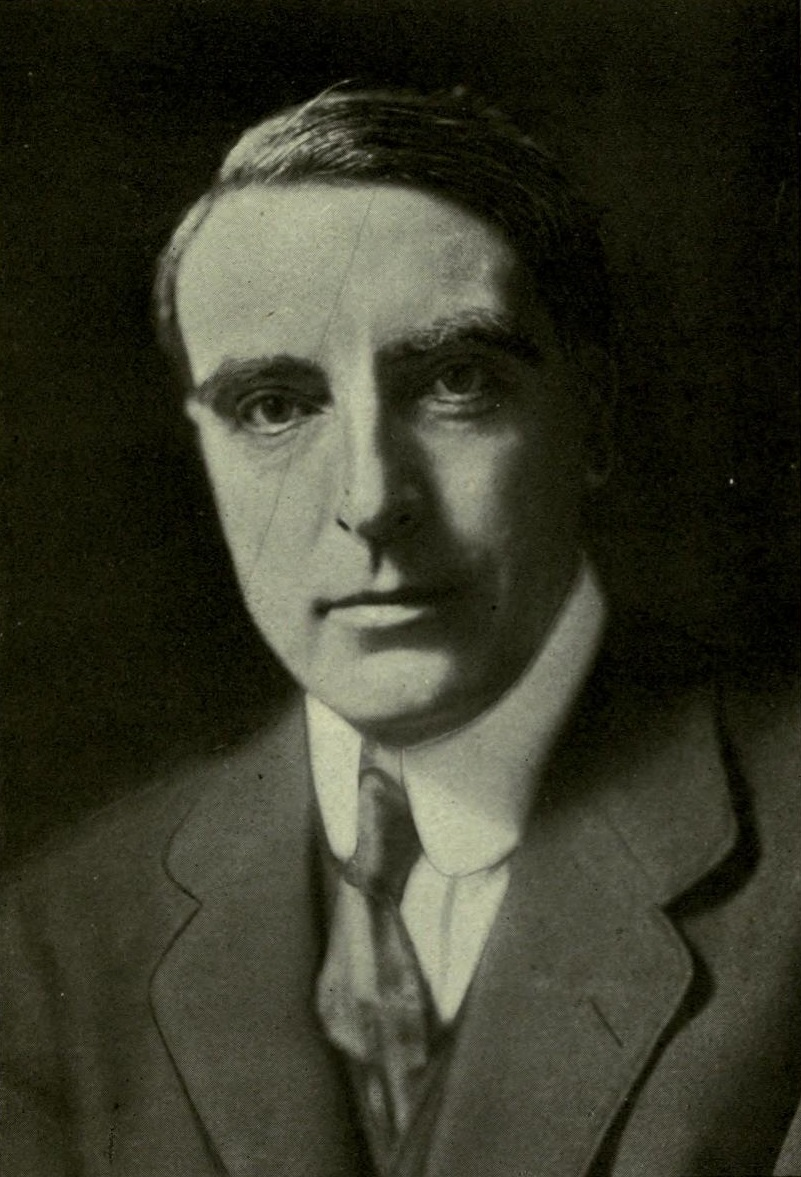
- Portrait of Edgar Rickard.
- Born: January 17, 1874; Pontgibaud, France
- Died: January 21, 1951 (aged 77); San Francisco, California
- Occupation: Mining Engineer
- Parent: Reuben Rickard

Edgar Rickard (January 17, 1874 – January 21, 1951) was a mining engineer and a lifelong confidant of U.S. President Herbert Hoover.

== Biography ==
=== Family ===
He was the son of mining engineer Reuben Rickard, and the brother of Thomas Rickard, also a mining engineer and one-time mayor of Berkeley, California. He was born on January 17, 1874, in Pontgibaud, France.

=== Career ===
Around the turn of the century, he served for many years as the editor of a mining journal in London.

=== Diary ===
Rickard maintained a diary. Due to his close connection with President Herbert Hoover, Rickard's diary has become an important source of information about Hoover.

=== Death ===
Rickard died on January 21, 1951 in San Francisco, California.
