= Doug Rickard (engineer) =

Australian-born space engineer

- Born: 26 May 1939
- Died: 7 May 2002 (aged 62)
- Education: The Southport School
- Spouse: Lehte
- Children: Jeremy, Ingrid, Madelaine, Raphael, James.
- Engineering career
- Discipline: Space Engineer
- Institutions: Woomera DSS, NASA JPL, Institute of Marine Science, University of Queensland, Digital Equipment Corporation, Project Athena (MIT)
- Projects: Mariner IV, Ranger 9, Maralinga Physics Health Team
- Significant design: Contributed to the Australian Broadcasting Corporation Logo, designed by Bill Kennard

Doug Rickard (26 May 1939 – 7 May 2002) was an Australian-born space engineer. He is known for his stories of engineering while at the Woomera Deep Space Station. He died in 2002 from myelofibrosis caused by contact with cobalt-60 while working at the Maralinga nuclear test facility.

Some of his stories have been collected by the Australian Broadcasting Corporation, whose logo he possibly inspired (although the logo was designed by Bill Kennard), under the title Memoirs of a space engineer. Additional humorous engineering stories include hand-decoding images from Mariner 4 onto a sheet of graph paper since NASA JPL had only built a single display system, running a magnetic tape recorder 25 times over its rated speed to have enough bandwidth to record Ranger 9 video of its impact on the moon, and an impromptu excavation of Pompeii's plumbing systems.

Rickard also worked for some time for the Australian subsidiary of Digital Equipment Corporation. During that time he was seconded to Project Athena, the Campuswide Computing environment developed at MIT, with the specific responsibility of developing "Bones" a version of the Kerberos Authentication System, that did not relying on strong encryption, and as such would not require US Government approval for export.
