= 1914 California gubernatorial election =

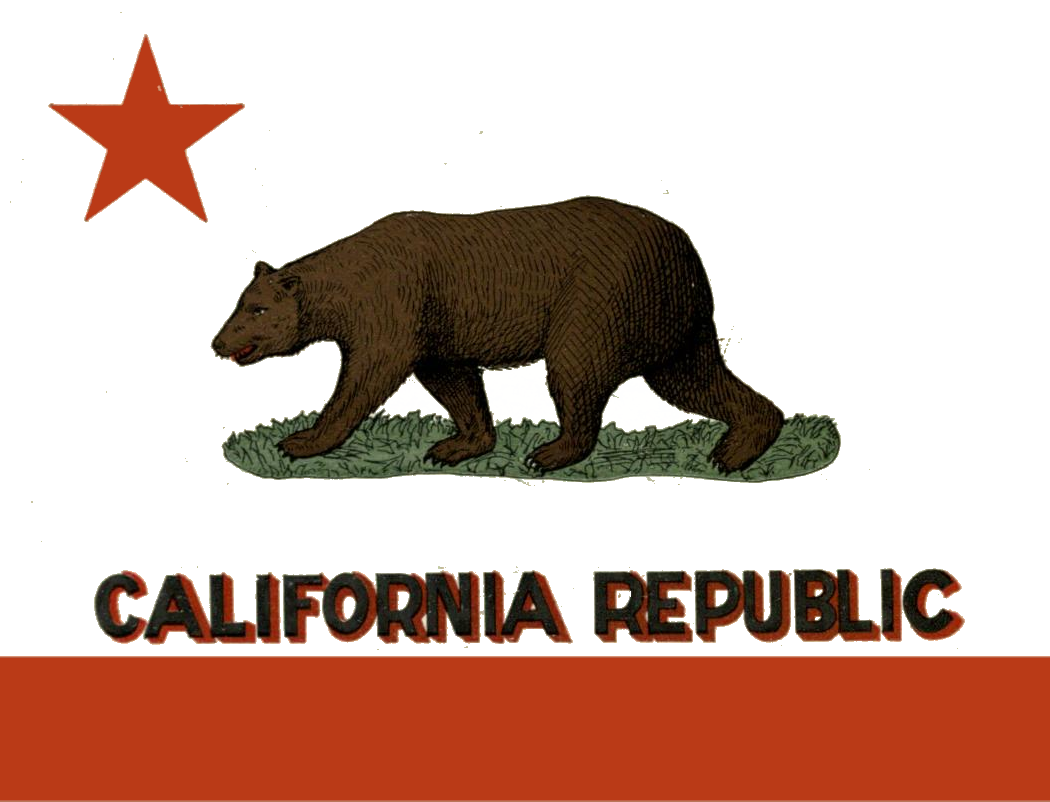
- November 3, 1914
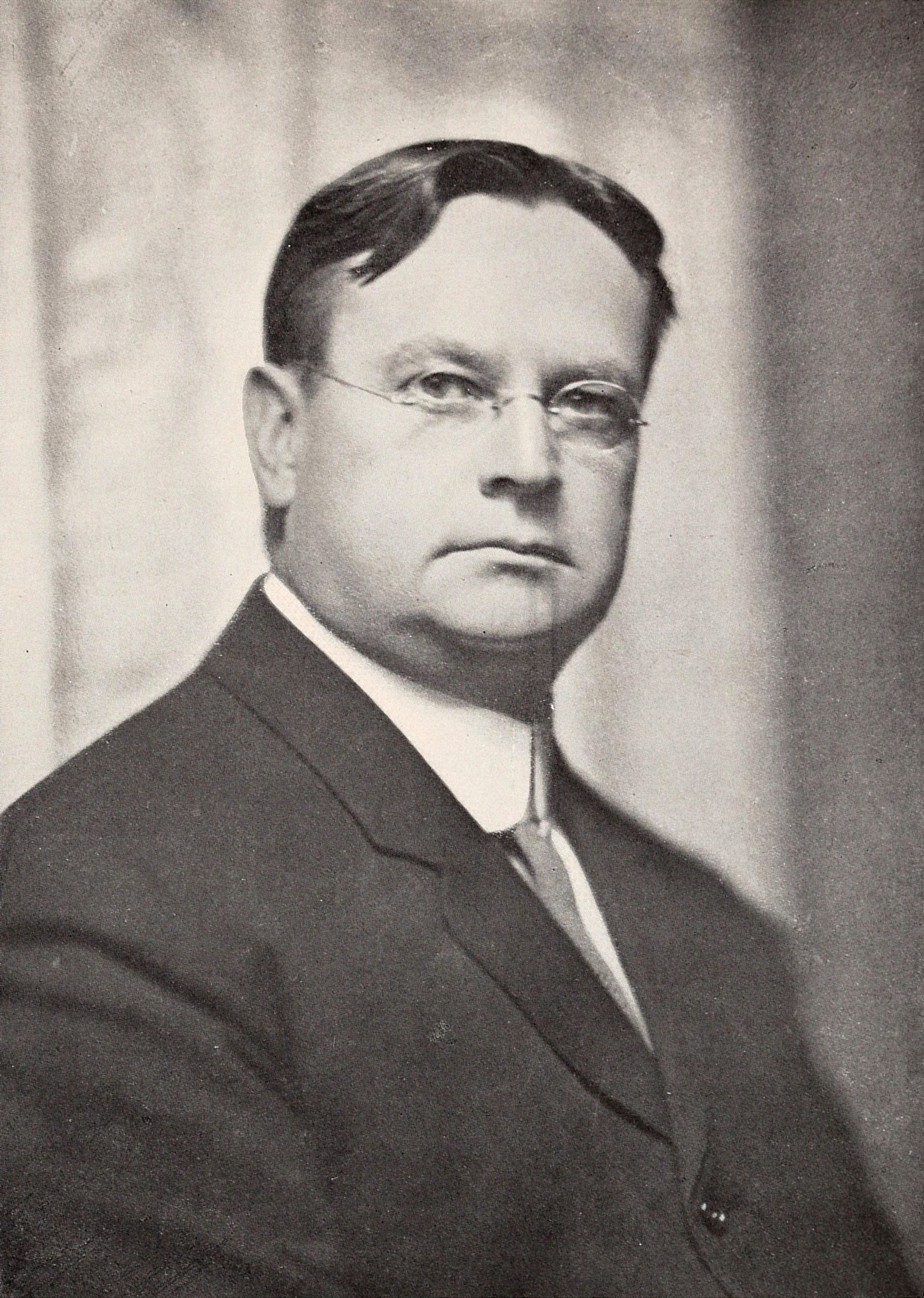

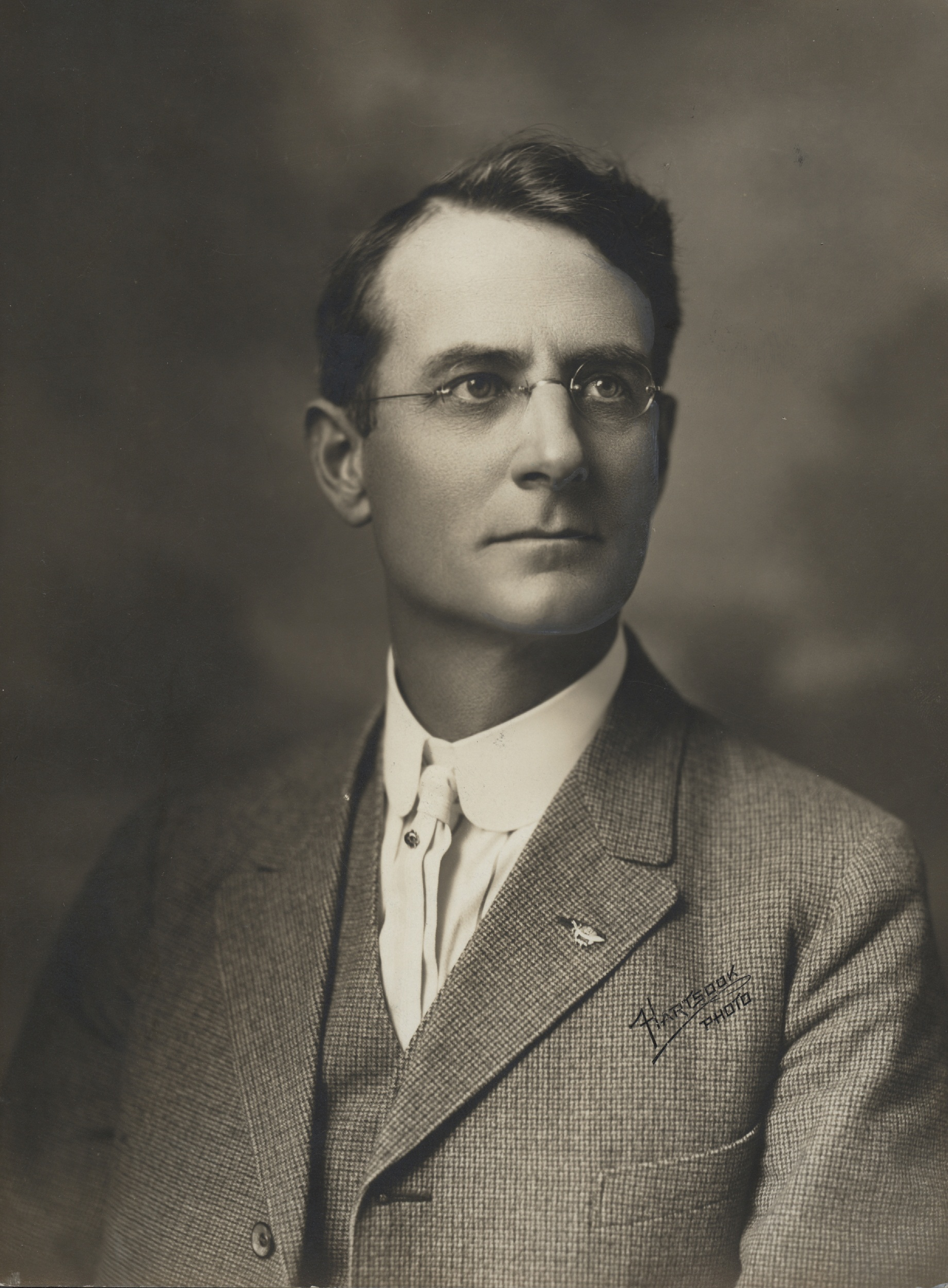

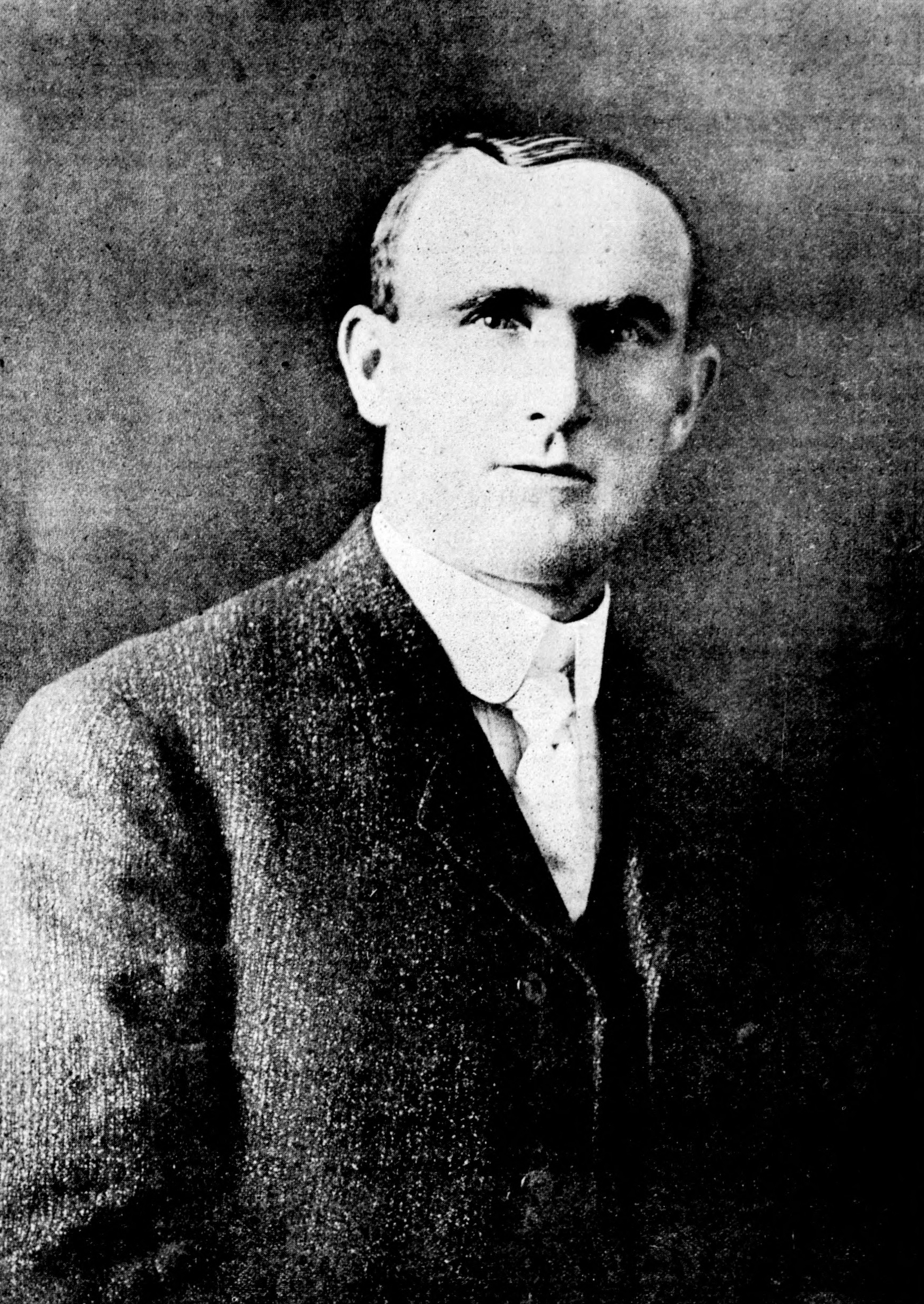

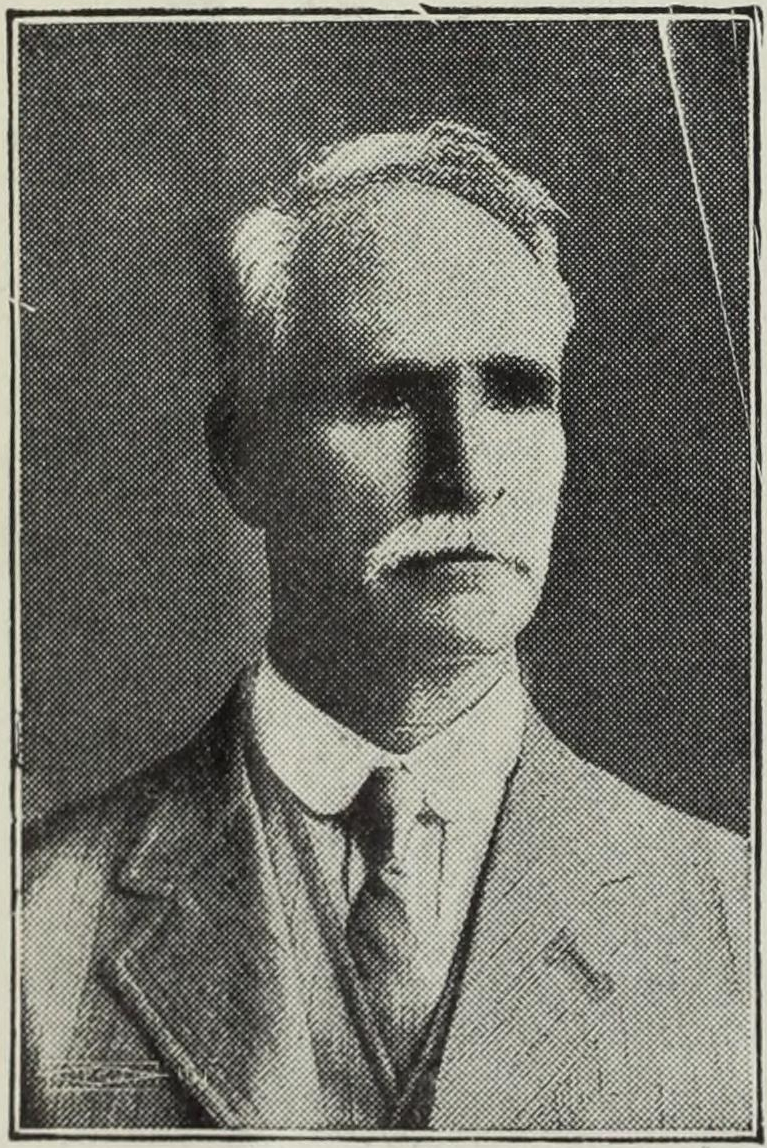
Nominee	Hiram Johnson	John D. Fredericks
Party	Progressive	Republican
Popular vote	460,495	271,990
Percentage	49.69%	29.35%
Nominee	John B. Curtin	Noble A. Richardson
Party	Democratic	Socialist
Popular vote	116,121	50,716
Percentage	12.53%	5.47%
- County results Johnson: 30–40% 40–50% 50–60% Fredericks: 30–40% 40–50%
Governor before election
Hiram Johnson
Progressive
Elected Governor
Hiram Johnson
Progressive

The 1914 California gubernatorial election was held on November 3, 1914. Incumbent governor Hiram Johnson was easily re-elected on the Progressive Party ticket over Republican prosecutor John D. Fredericks, Democratic state senator John Curtin, and Socialist author Noble Richardson.

Johnson became the first governor of California to win re-election since John Bigler in 1853. This was the first gubernatorial election in which each of Kern, Glenn, Lake, (Note: Lake County was carried by the Southern Democratic candidate in 1861) and Madera counties did not back the Democratic Party candidate and the first since 1855 in which each of Colusa, Mariposa, and Merced counties were not carried by a Democrat.

Johnson would not serve out his second term, resigning after his successful campaign for United States Senate in 1916. This election ushered in a four decade period of Republican dominance in the state's gubernatorial races that was only interrupted once in 1938.

== Background ==
Hiram Johnson was first elected governor in 1910 as a member of the Republican Party. However, dissatisfaction with the William Howard Taft administration led many Republicans to support Theodore Roosevelt for the 1912 Republican nomination. Facing defeat at the 1912 Republican National Convention, Roosevelt defected to run under a new Bull Moose Party banner, selecting Johnson as his vice-presidential running mate. In California, Roosevelt and Johnson ran on the Republican ticket and carried the state by fewer than 200 votes. Johnson was supremely popular in California.

Early in 1914, it was not immediately clear if Johnson would run for reelection as governor, run for the United States Senate, or retire from public office. On January 6, 1914, Johnson announced that he would stand for re-election as governor under the banner of the Bull Moose Party. Following this announcement, Hiram Johnson and other members of the party began a massive voter registration campaign, to get potential voters to register as Progressives.

== Republican primary ==
=== Candidates ===
- John D. Fredericks, Los Angeles County District Attorney since 1903
- Arthur Hathaway Hewitt, former Speaker of the California State Assembly (1911) and assemblyman from Yuba City (1908–11)

==== Declined ====
- Henry T. Gage, former governor (1899–1903) and U.S. minister to Portugal (1910)
- James C. Needham, former U.S. representative from Modesto (1899–1913)

=== Campaign ===
Early in the year, Los Angeles district attorney John D. Fredericks announced that he was willing to run for governor but qualified the statement by stating that he was willing to stand aside for another qualified candidate. The party faced an uphill battle following Johnson's defection to the Progressive Party. In February, Republican stalwarts met at Santa Barbara to discuss their strategy for the upcoming elections. Phillip A. Stanton and Leroy Wright lead the meeting, which was sponsored by Rudolph Spreckels. At the meeting, Republican leadership resolved to "reconstruct" the party after its 1912 split. Republicans also showed hostility towards California's direct primary law at the meeting and discussed possible candidates for governor including Fredericks, James C. Needham, and Henry Gage. On February 26, Arthur Hewitt declared his candidacy for the Republican nomination.

Fredericks spent over $14,000 on his primary campaign, a considerable amount compared to his primary opponents. Sources outside of California contributed $12,000.

== Democratic primary ==
=== Candidates ===
- John Curtin, state senator from Tuolumne County since 1899
- Fred H. Hall, former assemblyman from Bakersfield (1911–13)

==== Declined ====
- John B. Sanford, state senator from Ukiah

=== Campaign ===
In early 1914, the two candidates who were rumored to be aiming for the democratic nomination were John B. Curtin, a state senator from Sonora, and State Senator John B. Sanford of Ukiah. On February 7, 1914, Curtin made his intentions clear when he announced he was seeking the governorship. Later that month, Fred H. Hall of Bakersfield also entered the race, announcing his candidacy on February 28.

Curtin began his primary campaign in the city of Stockton on May 22, 1914. He would later announce his personal platform and political beliefs that he campaigned under. He advocated for the direct election of appointed state positions, such as Directors and Commissioners of state government offices. Additionally, Curtin advocated for state funding of elementary schooling as opposed to county funding, water conservation for farm irrigation purposes, the abolishment of "useless" government positions, and "an economical administration of the affairs of the state".

== General election ==
=== Candidates ===
- John Curtin, state senator from Tuolumne County since 1899 (Democratic)
- John D. Fredericks, Los Angeles County District Attorney since 1903 (Republican)
- Hiram Johnson, incumbent governor since 1911 (Bull Moose)
- Clinton P. Moore (Prohibition)
- Noble A. Richardson, writer (Socialist)

Noble A. Richardson, a writer, won the Socialist primary unopposed. Throughout the primary and general election campaign periods, he toured the state and gave speeches to several socialist gatherings which called attention to his campaign.

=== Campaign ===
Johnson officially kicked off his campaign in Los Angeles, where he gave a speech to a large crowd at the Simpson Auditorium. He had no party opposition and secured his nomination on August 26, 1914, allowing him to focus on the general election. On September 15, the Progressive Party held their convention in Sacramento, where they adopted a platform supporting a protective tariff, non-partisan elections, and the continuation of the work done by Johnson in his previous term.

While the campaigns were traveling across the state to appeal to the voters, there were efforts behind the scenes to remove several Progressive candidates from appearing on the general election ballots. Secretary of State Frank C. Jordan asked California Attorney General Ulysses S. Webb to clarify whether candidates can be on the November ballot if they had lost a primary election. Webb responded:

"If a registered Progressive, seeking Republican and Democratic nominations, obtains the Progressive nomination, his name will go on the ballot, according to Webb's ruling, even though be loses the Republican and Democratic nominations. On the other hand, if he should lose the Progressive and gain both of the other nominations, he is out of the running and cannot even be an independent candidate."

As a result, members of the Republican Party threatened to file suit against the state if any progressive were allowed to run in the general election after losing another party's primary, as the law indicated, "a candidate losing any party nomination shall not get on the November ballot."

This greatly concerned members of the Progressive Party, many of whom had cross-filed as Republicans, such as John Eshleman and Friend W. Richardson.

=== Results ===
1914 California gubernatorial election
Party	Candidate	Votes	%	±%
Progressive	Hiram W. Johnson (incumbent)	460,495	49.69%	+3.75%
Republican	John D. Fredericks	271,990	29.35%	−16.59%
Democratic	John B. Curtin	116,121	12.53%	−27.61%
Socialist	Noble A. Richardson	50,716	5.47%	−6.92%
Prohibition	Clinton P. Moore	27,345	2.95%	+1.45%
	Scattering	22	0.00%	
Majority		188,505	20.34%	
Total votes		926,689	100.00%	
Progressive hold		Swing	+14.55%	

==== Results by county ====
County	Hiram W. Johnson Progressive		John D. Fredericks Republican		John B. Curtin Democratic		Noble A. Richardson Socialist		Clinton P. Moore Prohibition		Scattering Write-in		Margin		Total votes cast
County	#	%	#	%	#	%	#	%	#	%	#	%	#	%	Total votes cast
Alameda	47,320	53.73%	25,612	29.08%	7,968	9.05%	5,800	6.59%	1,378	1.56%	0	0.00%	21,708	24.65%	88,078
Alpine	31	32.63%	42	44.21%	17	17.89%	4	4.21%	1	1.05%	0	0.00%	-11	-11.58%	95
Amador	1,311	37.88%	1,041	30.08%	929	26.84%	105	3.03%	75	2.17%	0	0.00%	270	7.80%	3,461
Butte	6,209	48.82%	3,357	26.39%	1,898	14.92%	729	5.73%	525	4.13%	1	0.01%	2,852	22.42%	12,719
Calaveras	1,291	36.85%	990	28.26%	935	26.69%	208	5.94%	79	2.26%	0	0.00%	301	8.59%	3,503
Colusa	1,229	34.34%	866	24.20%	1,208	33.75%	140	3.91%	136	3.80%	0	0.00%	21 (Note: Margin over Curtain)	0.59%	3,579
Contra Costa	6,966	54.86%	3,050	24.02%	1,657	13.05%	865	6.81%	160	1.26%	0	0.00%	3,916	30.84%	12,698
Del Norte	493	43.44%	355	31.28%	168	14.80%	81	7.14%	38	3.35%	0	0.00%	138	12.16%	1,135
El Dorado	1.155	36.74%	992	31.55%	743	23.63%	187	5.95%	66	2.10%	1	0.03%	163	5.18%	3,144
Fresno	14,095	50.81%	4,964	17.90%	5,566	20.07%	2,085	7.52%	1,029	3.71%	0	0.00%	8,529	30.75%	27,739
Glenn	1,529	43.31%	1,080	30.59%	633	17.93%	137	3.88%	147	4.16%	4	0.11%	449	12.72%	3,530
Humboldt	6,202	52.87%	3,696	31.51%	830	7.08%	869	7.41%	133	1.13%	0	0.00%	2,506	21.36%	11,730
Imperial	3,461	55.13%	1,255	19.99%	873	13.91%	437	6.96%	252	4.01%	0	0.00%	2,206	35.14%	6,278
Inyo	876	40.07%	601	27.49%	258	11.80%	378	17.29%	73	3.34%	0	0.00%	275	12.58%	2,186
Kern	7,590	48.84%	3,807	24.49%	3,178	20.45%	771	4.96%	196	1.26%	0	0.00%	3,783	24.34%	15,542
Kings	1,862	32.38%	2,092	36.38%	1,133	19.70%	353	6.14%	311	5.41%	0	0.00%	-230	-4.00%	5,751
Lake	612	24.33%	900	35.79%	587	23.34%	283	11.25%	133	5.29%	0	0.00%	-288	-11.45%	2,515
Lassen	1,133	45.93%	602	24.40%	400	16.21%	217	8.80%	115	4.66%	0	0.00%	531	21.52%	2,467
Los Angeles	119,824	53.58%	65,484	29.28%	18,331	8.20%	11,129	4.98%	8,879	3.97%	5	0.00%	54,340	24.30%	223,652
Madera	1,358	38.83%	712	20.36%	1,093	31.26%	203	5.80%	131	3.75%	0	0.00%	265	7.58%	3,497
Marin	4,065	48.04%	3,071	36.29%	871	10.29%	412	4.87%	43	0.51%	0	0.00%	994	11.75%	8,462
Mariposa	638	41.70%	229	14.97%	557	36.41%	59	3.86%	47	3.07%	0	0.00%	81	5.29%	1,530
Mendocino	3,087	38.45%	2,681	33.39%	1,585	19.74%	504	6.28%	172	2.14%	0	0.00%	406	5.06%	8,029
Merced	2,297	39.45%	1,402	24.08%	1,470	25.25%	406	6.97%	247	4.24%	0	0.00%	827	14.20%	5,822
Modoc	930	40.75%	532	23.31%	609	26.69%	137	6.00%	74	3.24%	0	0.00%	321	14.07%	2,282
Mono	187	41.74%	123	27.46%	71	15.85%	54	12.05%	13	2.90%	0	0.00%	64	14.29%	448
Monterey	3,531	43.67%	2,697	33.36%	1,313	16.24%	273	3.38%	271	3.35%	0	0.00%	834	10.32%	8,085
Napa	3,234	41.13%	3,077	39.13%	1,098	13.96%	316	4.02%	138	1.76%	0	0.00%	157	2.00%	7,863
Nevada	2,830	53.70%	949	18.01%	1,101	20.89%	295	5.60%	95	1.80%	0	0.00%	1,729	32.81%	5,270
Orange	7,304	41.72%	6,096	34.82%	2.184	12.47%	815	4.66%	1,109	6.33%	0	0.00%	1,208	6.90%	17,508
Placer	3,846	59.03%	1,416	21.73%	705	10.82%	375	5.76%	173	2.66%	0	0.00%	2,430	37.30%	6,515
Plumas	1,042	52.36%	527	26.48%	232	11.66%	156	7.84%	33	1.66%	0	0.00%	515	25.88%	1,990
Riverside	6,337	48.87%	4,026	31.05%	1,146	8.84%	754	5.81%	705	5.44%	0	0.00%	2,311	17.82%	12,968
Sacramento	16,954	58.00%	8,661	29.63%	2,284	7.81%	965	3.30%	367	1.26%	0	0.00%	8,293	28.37%	29,231
San Benito	1,234	40.77%	1,184	39.11%	454	15.00%	101	3.34%	54	1.78%	0	0.00%	50	1.65%	3,027
San Bernardino	8,787	41.07%	7,634	35.68%	2,096	9.80%	1,367	6.39%	1,510	7.06%	0	0.00%	1,153	5.39%	21,394
San Diego	14,152	40.49%	14,365	41.10%	2,864	8.19%	1,879	5.38%	1,694	4.85%	1	0.00%	-213	-0.61%	34,955
San Francisco	72,257	54.70%	36,606	27.71%	16,167	12.24%	6,346	4.80%	723	0.55%	4	0.00%	35,651	26.99%	132,103
San Joaquin	8,898	44.48%	5,759	28.79%	3,848	19.24%	805	4.02%	694	3.47%	0	0.00%	3,139	15.69%	20,004
San Luis Obispo	3,303	48.48%	1,890	27.74%	982	14.41%	457	6.71%	181	2.66%	0	0.00%	1,413	20.74%	6,813
San Mateo	5,208	54.76%	2,839	29.85%	1,002	10.54%	392	4.12%	69	0.73%	0	0.00%	2,369	24.91%	9,510
Santa Barbara	3,952	42.42%	2,760	29.63%	1,675	17.98%	547	5.87%	382	4.10%	0	0.00%	1,192	12.80%	9,316
Santa Clara	14,267	47.05%	10,792	35.59%	3,337	11.01%	1,108	3.65%	813	2.68%	4	0.01%	3,475	11.46%	30,321
Santa Cruz	4,232	45.23%	2,814	30.07%	1,417	15.14%	540	5.77%	354	3.78%	0	0.00%	1,418	15.15%	9,357
Shasta	2,711	45.68%	1,567	26.40%	811	13.66%	640	10.78%	206	3.47%	0	0.00%	1,144	19.28%	5,935
Sierra	568	46.33%	410	33.44%	149	12.15%	72	5.87%	27	2.20%	0	0.00%	158	12.89%	1,226
Siskiyou	2,663	41.66%	1,747	27.33%	1,342	20.99%	483	7.56%	157	2.46%	0	0.00%	916	14.33%	6,392
Solano	5,467	51.05%	2,837	26.49%	1,679	15.68%	544	5.08%	183	1.71%	0	0.00%	2,630	24.56%	10,710
Sonoma	7,693	40.36%	6,945	36.44%	2,967	15.57%	1,030	5.40%	426	2.23%	0	0.00%	748	3.92%	19,061
Stanislaus	5,245	43.74%	2,201	18.36%	2,530	21.10%	876	7.31%	1,138	9.49%	0	0.00%	2,715	22.64%	11,990
Sutter	1,083	34.33%	1,463	46.37%	397	12.58%	97	3.07%	114	3.61%	1	0.03%	-380	-12.04%	3,155
Tehama	2,108	41.29%	1,229	24.07%	1,084	21.23%	394	7.72%	290	5.68%	0	0.00%	879	17.22%	5,105
Trinity	650	41.94%	399	25.74%	267	17.23%	211	13.61%	23	1.48%	0	0.00%	251	16.19%	1,550
Tulare	6,480	42.56%	3,479	22.85%	3,349	22.00%	1,369	8.99%	547	3.59%	0	0.00%	3,001	19.71%	15,224
Tuolumne	1,385	39.25%	490	13.88%	1,309	37.09%	301	8.53%	44	1.25%	0	0.00%	76	2.15%	3,529
Ventura	2,787	41.58%	2,649	39.53%	824	12.29%	295	4.40%	146	2.18%	1	0.01%	138	2.06%	6,702
Yolo	2,383	39.51%	1,913	31.71%	1,353	22.43%	231	3.83%	152	2.52%	0	0.00%	470	7.79%	6,032
Yuba	2,153	54.15%	1,033	25.98%	587	14.76%	129	3.24%	74	1.86%	0	0.00%	1,120	28.17%	3,976
Total	460,495	49.69%	271,990	29.35%	116,121	12.53%	50,716	5.47%	27,345	2.95%	22	0.00%	188,505	20.34%	926,689

==== Counties that flipped from Democratic to Progressive ====
- Amador
- Calaveras
- Colusa
- El Dorado
- Glenn
- Inyo
- Kern
- Madera
- Mariposa
- Mendocino
- Merced
- Napa
- Placer
- Sacramento
- Siskiyou
- Solano
- Sonoma
- Tehama
- Tuolumne
- Yolo
- Yuba

==== Counties that flipped from Progressive to Republican ====
- Alpine
- Kings
- San Diego
- Sutter

==== Counties that flipped from Democratic to Republican ====
- Lake
