= Joe Crail =

American politician

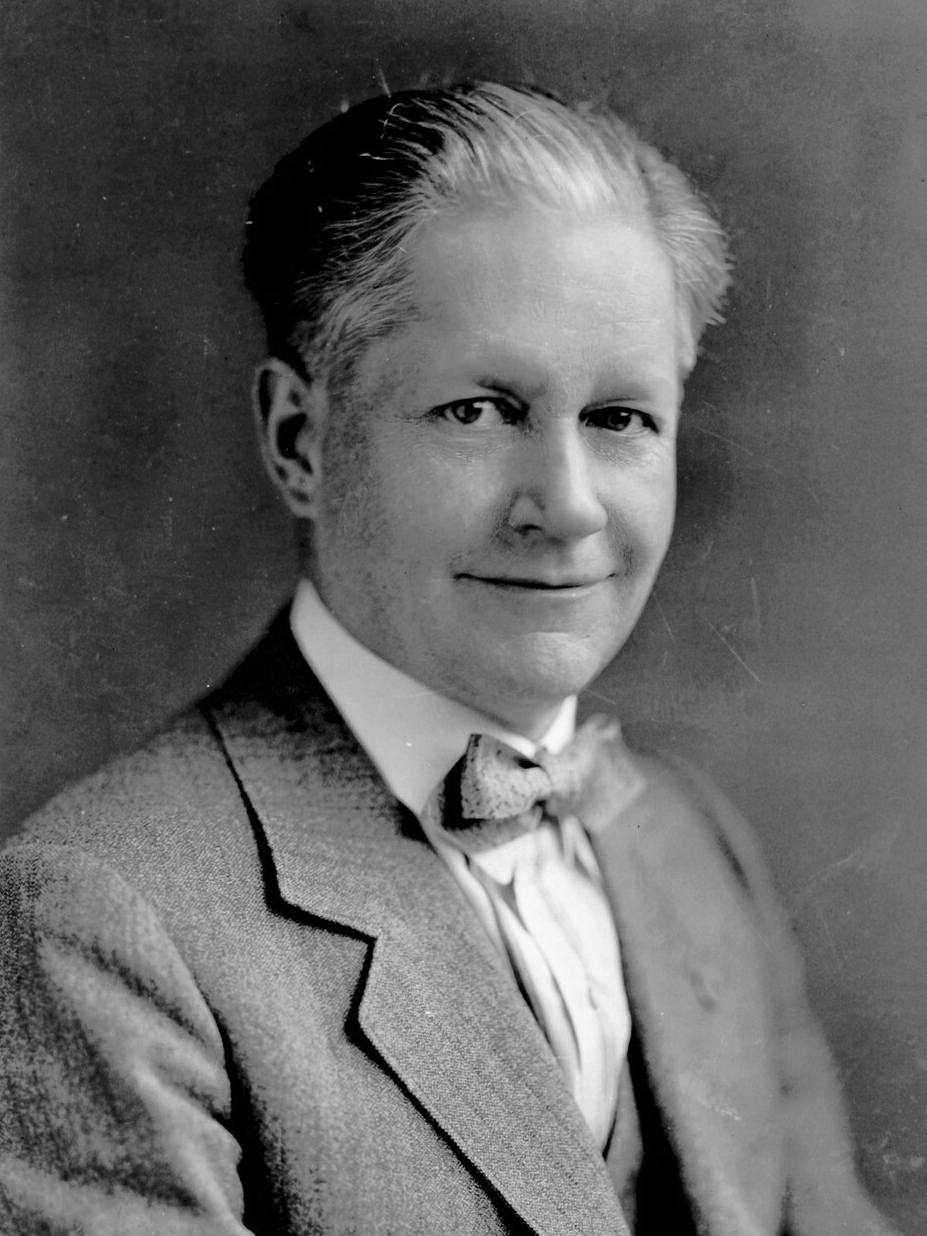
- Crail c. 1926

Member of the U.S. House of Representatives from California's 10th congressional district
- In office March 4, 1927 – March 3, 1933
- Preceded by: John D. Fredericks
- Succeeded by: Henry E. Stubbs

Personal details
- Born: Joseph Steele Crail; December 25, 1877 Fairfield, Iowa, US
- Died: March 2, 1938 (aged 60) Los Angeles, California, US
- Resting place: Inglewood Park Mausoleum, Inglewood, California
- Education: Drake University

Joseph Steele Crail (December 25, 1877 – March 2, 1938) was an American lawyer, military veteran and politician who served as a United States representative from California from 1927 to 1933.

== Early life and education ==
Born in Fairfield, Iowa, he attended the public schools and graduated from Drake University in Des Moines, Iowa in 1898.

== Military service ==
During the Spanish–American War, Crail enlisted as a private in the Twelfth Company, United States Volunteer Signal Corps. He was promoted to corporal and served in the American Army of Occupation in Cuba until its withdrawal.

== Career ==
He studied law at the Iowa College of Law and was admitted to the bar in 1903, commencing practice in his native Fairfield.

In 1912 he was an unsuccessful candidate for Congress from the district that included Fairfield, running as a member of the Progressive Party.

=== Congress ===
Crail moved to California in 1913, settled in Los Angeles, and practiced law until elected to Congress. He served as chairman of the Republican State central committee for southern California, 1918–20. He was elected as a Republican to the Seventieth, Seventy-first, and Seventy-second Congresses (March 4, 1927 – March 3, 1933), representing California's 10th congressional district.

He did not seek renomination in 1932, but was unsuccessful for the nomination for United States Senator.

== Later career and death ==
He resumed the practice of law but also engaged in banking.

He died in Los Angeles, California in 1938 and was buried in Inglewood Park Mausoleum, Inglewood, California.

== Electoral history ==
1926 United States House of Representatives elections
Party	Candidate	Votes	%
Republican	Joe Crail (Incumbent)	144,677	86.8
Socialist	N. Jackson Wright	21,997	13.2
Total votes		166,674	100.0
Turnout			
Republican hold			

1928 United States House of Representatives elections
Party	Candidate	Votes	%
Republican	Joe Crail (Incumbent)	301,028	93.9
Democratic	Harry Sherr	19,659	6.1
Total votes		320,687	100.0
Turnout			
Republican hold			

1930 United States House of Representatives elections
Party	Candidate	Votes	%
Republican	Joe Crail (Incumbent)	162,502	75.0
Democratic	John F. Dockweiler	54,231	25.0
Total votes		216,733	100
Turnout			
Republican hold			

1932 Republican Senate primary
Party	Candidate	Votes	%
Republican	Tallant Tubbs	217,047	25.06%
Republican	Samuel Morgan Shortridge (incumbent)	206,450	23.83%
Prohibition	Robert P. Shuler (cross-filing)	198,619	22.93%
Republican	Joe Crail	187,999	21.70%
Republican	Leo V. Youngworth	56,110	6.48%
Total votes		866,225	100.00%

U.S. House of Representatives
Preceded by John D. Fredericks	Member of the U.S. House of Representatives from California's 10th congressional district 1927–1933	Succeeded by Henry E. Stubbs
