= 1932 United States Senate election in California =

- November 6, 1932
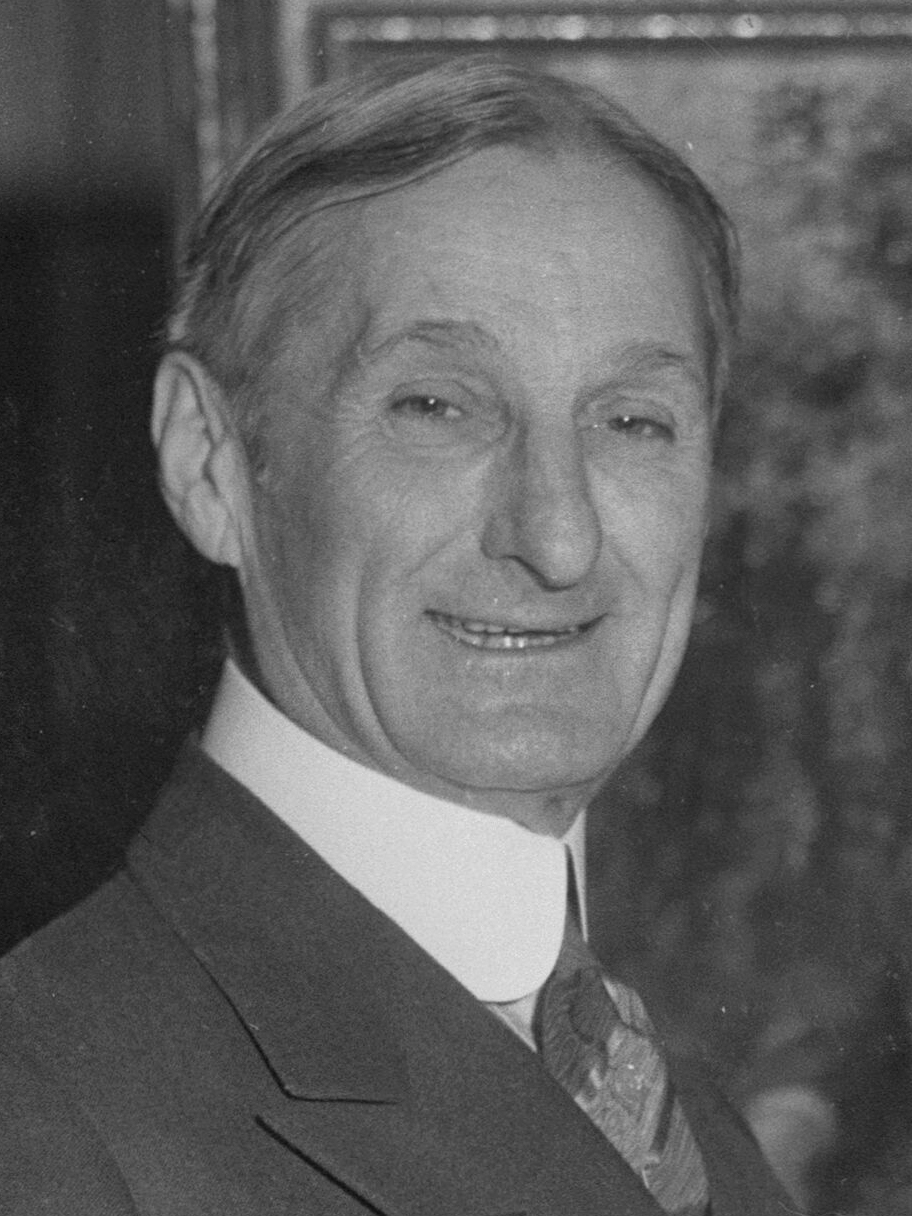

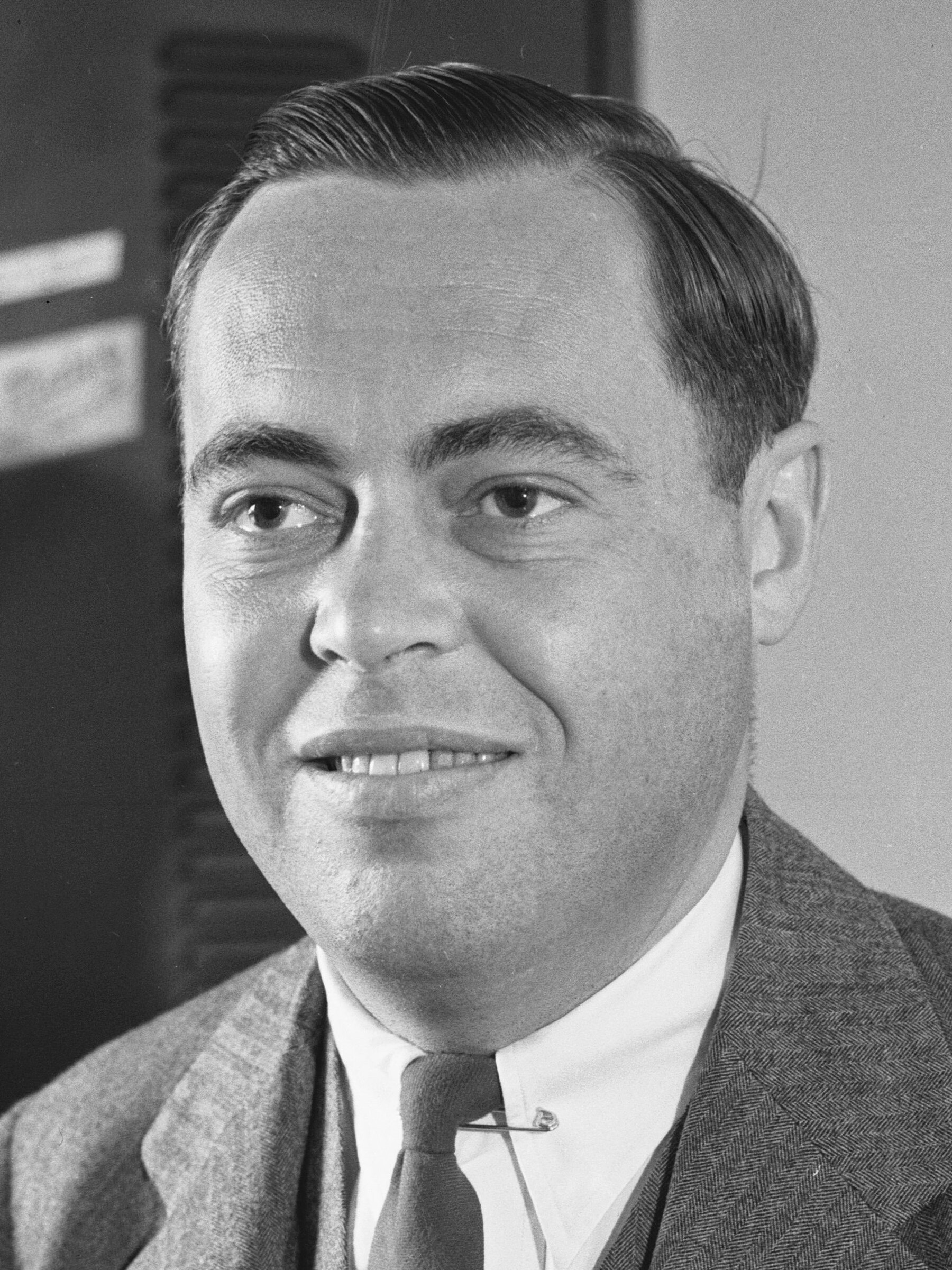

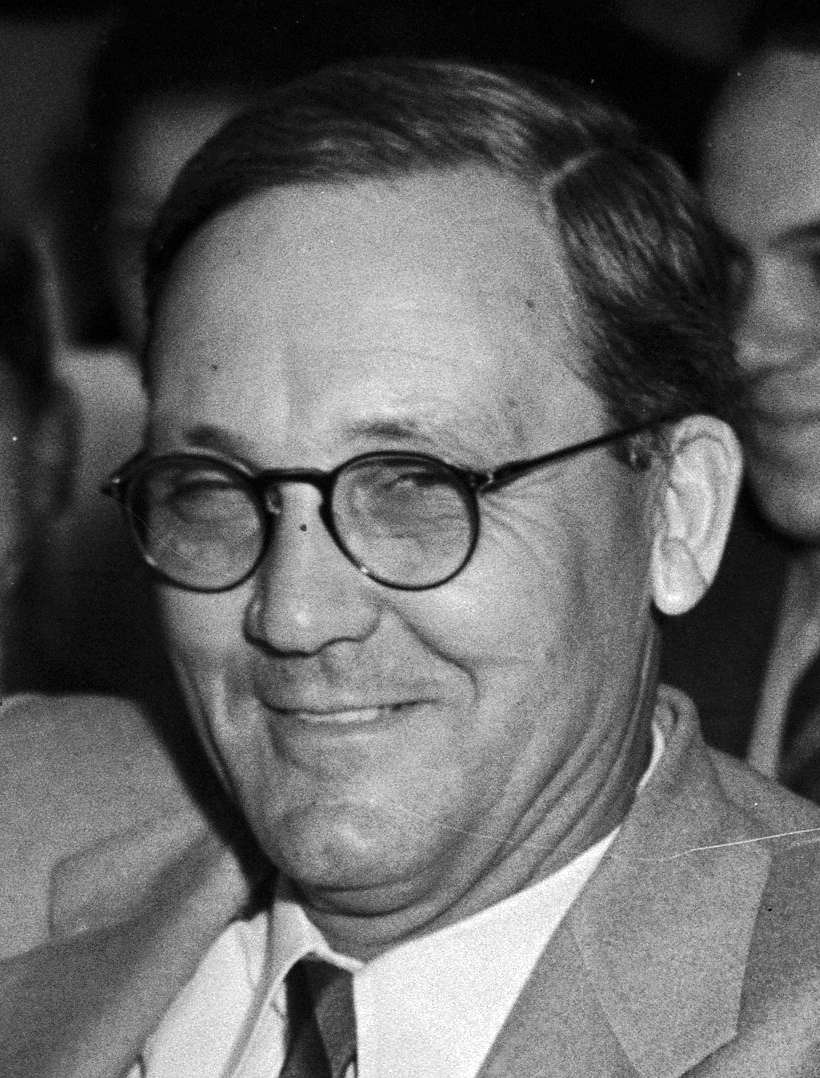
Nominee	William Gibbs McAdoo	Tallant Tubbs	Robert P. Shuler
Party	Democratic	Republican	Prohibition
Popular vote	943,164	669,676	560,088
Percentage	43.39%	30.81%	25.77%
- County results McAdoo: 30–40% 40–50% 50–60% 60–70% Tubbs: 30–40% 40–50% 50–60% 60–70% Shuler: 30–40% 40–50%
U.S. senator before election
Samuel Morgan Shortridge
Republican
Elected U.S. Senator
William Gibbs McAdoo
Democratic

The 1932 United States Senate election in California was held on November 2, 1932. Republican incumbent Samuel M. Shortridge ran for re-election to a third term in office but lost a four-way Republican primary to San Francisco state senator Tallant Tubbs. In the general election, Tubbs lost to former U.S. treasury secretary and presidential candidate William Gibbs McAdoo won in a three-way race against preacher Robert P. Shuler, who received the most votes of any Prohibition Party candidate in United States history.

== Republican primary ==
=== Candidates ===
- Joe Crail, U.S. representative from Inglewood
- Samuel M. Shortridge, incumbent U.S. senator since 1921
- Robert P. Shuler, Southern Methodist evangelist preacher (cross-filing)
- Tallant Tubbs, state senator from San Francisco
- Leo V. Youngworth

=== Results ===
1932 Republican Senate primary
Party	Candidate	Votes	%
Republican	Tallant Tubbs	217,047	25.06%
Republican	Samuel M. Shortridge (incumbent)	206,450	23.83%
Prohibition	Robert P. Shuler (cross-filing)	198,619	22.93%
Republican	Joe Crail	187,999	21.70%
Republican	Leo V. Youngworth	56,110	6.48%
Total votes		866,225	100.00%

== Democratic primary ==
=== Candidates ===
- P. M. Abbott
- Annie Hale
- William Gibbs McAdoo, former U.S. treasury secretary and candidate for president of the United States in 1920 and 1924
- M. J. McCarthy
- Robert P. Shuler, Southern Methodist evangelist preacher (cross-filing)
- Justus S. Wardell, chair of the California Democratic Party and nominee for governor of California in 1926

=== Results ===
1932 Democratic Senate primary
Party	Candidate	Votes	%
Democratic	William Gibbs McAdoo	269,746	52.55%
Democratic	Justus S. Wardell	116,845	22.76%
Prohibition	Robert P. Shuler (cross-filing)	86,259	16.81%
Democratic	M. J. McCarthy	18,702	3.64%
Democratic	P. M. Abbott	13,836	2.70%
Democratic	Annie Hale	7,910	1.54%
Total votes		513,298	100.00%

== General election ==
=== Candidates ===
- William Gibbs McAdoo, former U.S. treasury secretary and candidate for president of the United States in 1920 and 1924 (Democratic)
- Robert P. Shuler, Southern Methodist evangelist preacher (Prohibition)
- Tallant Tubbs, state senator from San Francisco (Republican)

=== Results ===
1932 United States Senate election in California
Party	Candidate	Votes	%
Democratic	William Gibbs McAdoo	943,164	43.39%
Republican	Tallant Tubbs	669,676	30.81%
Prohibition	Robert P. Shuler	560,088	25.77%
Socialist	George Ross Kirkpatrick (write-in)	466	0.02%
Total votes		1,061,727	100.00%

== See also ==
- 1932 United States Senate elections
