= John D. Fredericks =

American politician

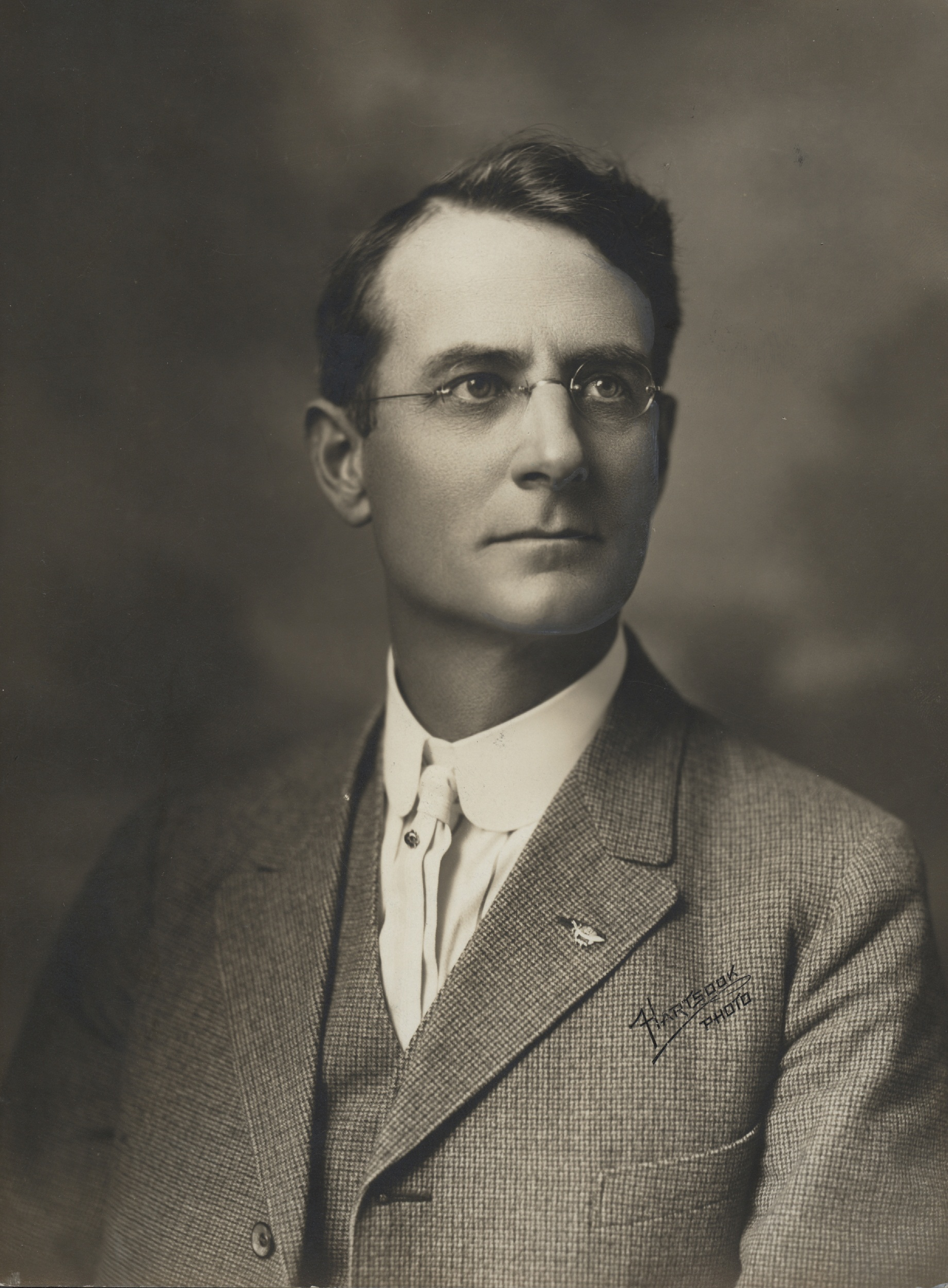
- Portrait by Fred Hartsook c. 1914

Member of the U.S. House of Representatives from California's 10th district
- In office May 1, 1923 – March 3, 1927
- Preceded by: Henry Z. Osborne
- Succeeded by: Joe Crail

26th Los Angeles County District Attorney
- In office 1903–1915
- Preceded by: James C. Rives
- Succeeded by: Thomas L. Woolwine

Personal details
- Born: John Donnan Fredericks; September 10, 1869 Burgettstown, Pennsylvania
- Died: August 26, 1945 (aged 75) Los Angeles, California
- Resting place: Forest Lawn Memorial Park in Glendale, California
- Party: Republican

John Donnan Fredericks (September 10, 1869 – August 26, 1945) was an American lawyer and politician from Los Angeles, California, who served two terms as a U.S. representative from 1923 to 1927. As District Attorney of Los Angeles County (1903-1915) he successfully prosecuted the McNamara brothers for their 1910 bombing of the Los Angeles Times building.

== Biography ==
Born in Burgettstown, Pennsylvania, Fredericks attended the public schools and Washington and Jefferson College, Washington, Pennsylvania. He studied law, was admitted to the bar in 1896, and commenced practice in Los Angeles.

=== Spanish-American War ===
Fredericks served as an adjutant in the Seventh Regiment, California Volunteer Infantry, during the Spanish–American War in 1898.

=== Early political career ===
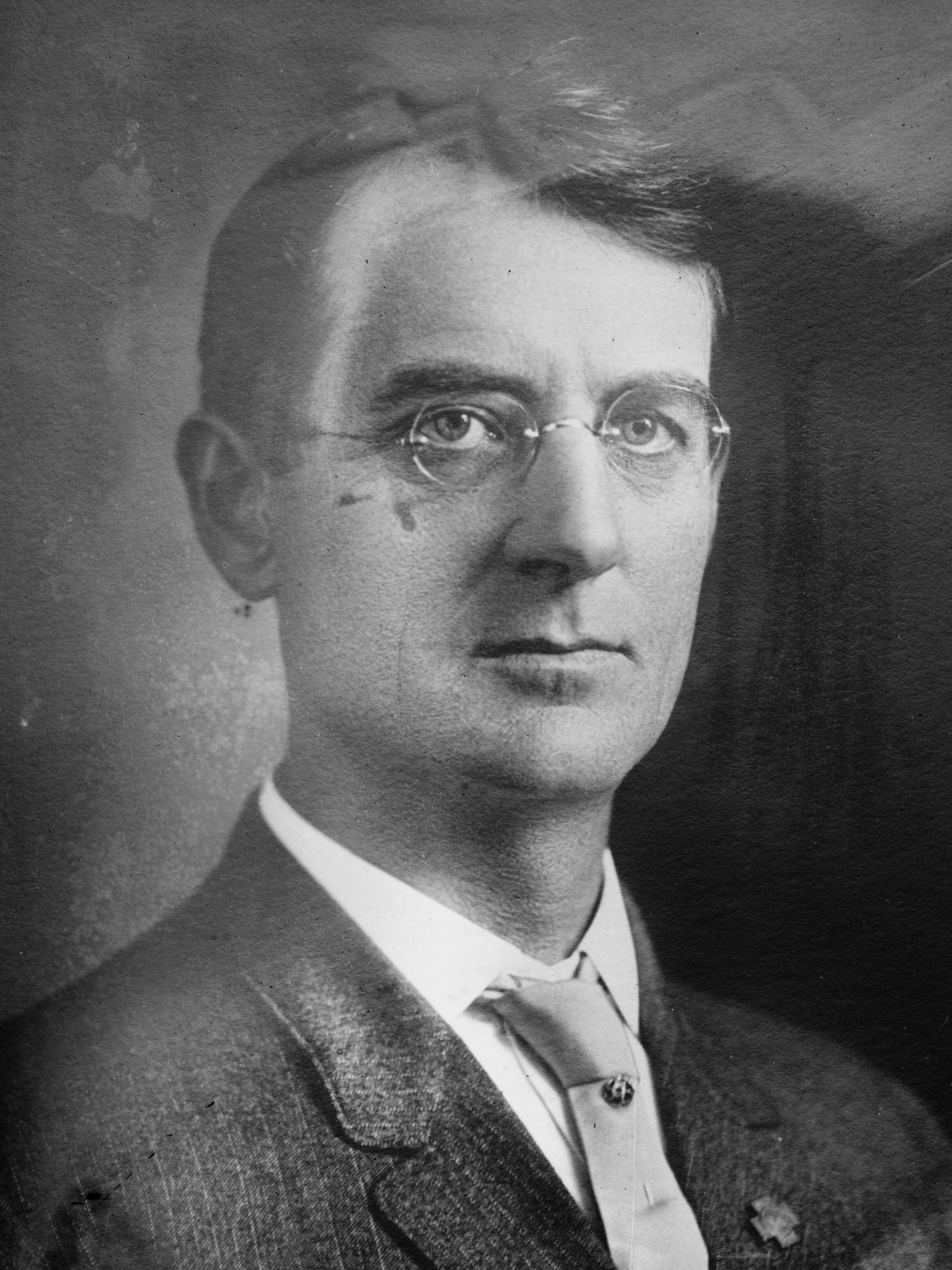
Fredericks c. 1900s–1910s

He was elected district attorney of Los Angeles County in 1902 and re-elected in 1906 and 1910, serving from 1903 to 1915. During his tenure as district attorney, he gained national attention for the successful prosecution of the McNamara brothers for their bombing of the Los Angeles Times building on October 1, 1910. Clarence Darrow was the chief attorney for the defense.

Fredericks was the unsuccessful Republican nominee for Governor of California in 1914 against popular incumbent Hiram W. Johnson, who had been elected under the Republican Party banner four years earlier but now ran under the short-lived Progressive Party of Theodore Roosevelt. In 1922, Fredericks was elected president of the Los Angeles Area Chamber of Commerce and served a one-year term.

=== Congress ===
Fredericks was elected as a Republican to the Sixty-eighth Congress on May 1, 1923, to fill the vacancy caused by the death of Henry Z. Osborne. He was elected in 1924 to a full term in the Sixty-ninth Congress, but did not seek renomination in 1926. His congressional career ended March 3, 1927.

=== Later career ===
In 1915, after leaving office as Los Angeles County district attorney, Fredericks founded the law firm of Fredericks and Hanna. The firm is still in existence and is now known as Hanna and Morton LLP.

== Death and burial ==
Fredericks died of a heart attack on August 26, 1945. He was interred in Forest Lawn Memorial Park in Glendale, California.

== Electoral history ==
Republican John D. Fredericks won the special election to replace fellow Republican Henry Z. Osborne, who died in office.

1923 10th congressional district special election
Party	Candidate	Votes	%
Republican	John D. Fredericks	28,084	36.16
Republican	Henry Z. Osborne Jr.	18,103	23.31
Democratic	Lloy Galpin	13,748	17.70
Republican	Alfred L. Bartlett	8,857	11.40
Republican	Frank A. McDonald	5,884	7.58
Prohibition	John C. Bell	1,875	2.41
Independent	Upton Sinclair	1,113	1.43
Total votes		77,664	100
Turnout			
Republican hold			

1924 United States House of Representatives elections
Party	Candidate	Votes	%
Republican	John D. Fredericks (Incumbent)	133,780	62.3
Democratic	Robert W. Richardson	80,870	37.7
Total votes		214,650	100.0
Turnout			
Republican hold			

U.S. House of Representatives
Preceded by Henry Z. Osborne	Member of the U.S. House of Representatives from California's 10th congressional district 1923–1927	Succeeded by Joe Crail
Party political offices
Preceded by Hiram Johnson	Republican nominee for Governor of California; 1914	Succeeded by William Stephens
