= Trinity Methodist Church, South v. Federal Radio Commission =

Court case

- Court: United States Court of Appeals for the District of Columbia Circuit
- Full case name: Trinity Methodist Church, South v. Federal Radio Commission
- Argued: May 3–4, 1932
- Decided: November 28, 1932
- Citation: 62 F.2d 850

Case history
- Procedural history: Upheld administrative ruling by the Federal Radio Commission.

Holding
- Due process was exercised by the Federal Radio Commission in refusing to renew a broadcasting license for radio station KGEF due to content that violated the public interest.

Case opinions
- Majority: Duncan Lawrence Groner, joined by Josiah Alexander Van Orsdel

Laws applied
- Radio Act of 1927, First Amendment to the United States Constitution, Fifth Amendment to the United States Constitution

Trinity Methodist Church, South v. Federal Radio Commission, 62 F.2d 850 (D.C. Circuit, 1932), was an early precedent on the enforcement of broadcasting law in the United States. The United States Court of Appeals for the District of Columbia Circuit upheld a decision by the Federal Radio Commission (FRC) to deny a broadcasting license for radio station KGEF, due to controversial content broadcast by Robert P. Shuler. The court held that the public interest in appropriate content on the broadcast airwaves can override free speech concerns under the First Amendment, and that the denial of a radio station license is acceptable if done per due process of law requirements under the Fifth Amendment.

== Background ==
Trinity Methodist Church, South in Los Angeles, California was listed in documents filed with the Federal Radio Commission as the owner of radio station KGEF, which had first received a broadcasting license in 1926. The commission determined that despite the church's name, the radio station was in fact owned and dominated by evangelist and political provocateur Robert P. Shuler, popularly known as "Fighting Bob", who used the station to broadcast political and religious opinions that created controversy in the community. Shuler had become known for personal attacks on politicians and local police officials, criticism of libraries and schools for teaching subjects like evolution, and disparagement of Jews and Roman Catholics.

The station applied for a renewal of its license in 1930, at which time chief FRC examiner Ellis A. Yost expressed misgivings about Shuler's "extremely indiscreet" broadcasts, but ultimately recommended approval. A review by the commission's leadership concluded that the station's request should be denied, because it "could not determine that the granting thereof was in the public interest," because "the programs broadcast by its principal speaker were sensational rather than instructive and in two instances he had been convicted of attempting over the radio to obstruct orderly administration of public justice".

Shuler and the church filed suit at the United States Court of Appeals for the District of Columbia Circuit, requesting a stay order on the FRC's denial of the license application, which the court initially refused. That action was then appealed and the dispute advanced to a full trial, with Shuler and the church citing violations of free speech and due process of law. The appellants also claimed that the license denial was arbitrary and capricious, which was prohibited under American administrative law

== Opinion of the court ==
The United States Court of Appeals for the District of Columbia Circuit largely avoided an analysis of the First Amendment in the case, stating that licensing of speech (or the refusal thereof) by government is only censorship if the affected party is also prohibited from expression via any other forum.

The court instead analyzed the provisions of the Radio Act of 1927 to determine if the FRC had the authority to act as it did. Per precedent, government management of the use of spectrum frequencies by broadcasters had long been considered by American courts to be a type of regulation of interstate commerce. This in turn is permitted by the Commerce Clause of the U.S. Constitution, when such interstate commerce has implications for the public interest. Hence, the court found that the FRC had concluded appropriately that Shuler's broadcasts on KGEF were not in the public interest, largely due to his verbal attacks against his political enemies, many of which included false accusations of crimes.

The court held that denying or revoking a radio broadcast license, if doing so in the public interest, can override the free speech interests of the applicant. Such action was also permitted by Congress in the text of the Radio Act. The court also held that such a licensing denial did not violate the Fifth Amendment prohibition of "taking of property" without due process of law.

Shuler and the station appealed the decision to the United States Supreme Court, but their writ of certioari was denied and the lower court decision stood.

== Impact ==
Trinity Methodist Church, South v. Federal Radio Commission has been cited as an important early precedent supporting American government regulation of pervasive broadcast frequencies, which may not always carry content that is in the public interest, or in the interests of some listeners/viewers, particularly when discussions of religion generate controversy.

On the other hand, the ruling has been criticized by opponents of media content regulation for setting a precedent allowing the Federal Radio Commission, and its successor the Federal Communications Commission, to ignore free speech protections for broadcasters while focusing on the public interest instead. Notwithstanding his controversial behavior, "Fighting Bob" Shuler has been cited for his important impact on the history of American broadcasting law.
