= John Curtin (American politician) =

American politician (1867–1925)

John B. Curtin
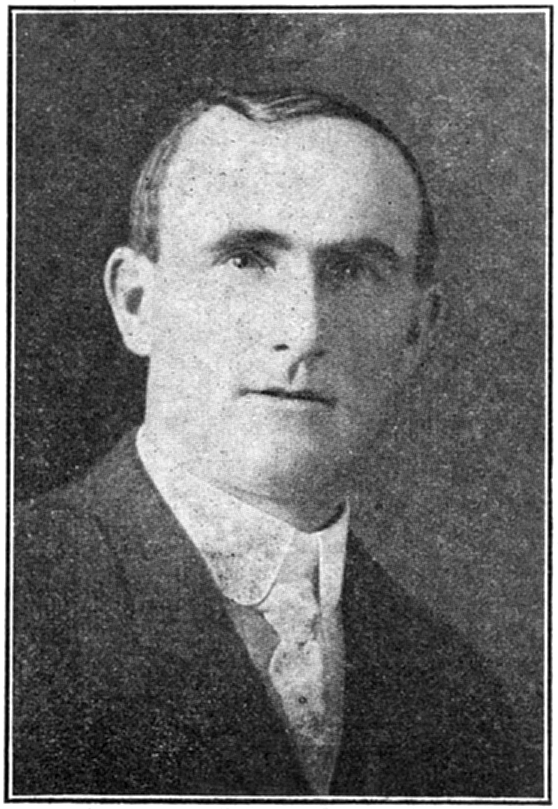
- Curtin c. 1913

Member of the California Senate from the 12th district
- In office January 2, 1899 – January 4, 1915
- Preceded by: John Henry Shine
- Succeeded by: Lafayette Jackson Maddux

District Attorney of Tuolumne County
- In office 1892–1898

Personal details
- Born: May 15, 1867 Gold Springs, California, U.S.
- Died: May 18, 1925 (aged 58) Sonora, California, U.S.
- Party: Democratic
- Spouse: Lucy A. Shaw
- Children: 1
- Occupation: Attorney

John Barry Curtin (May 15, 1867 – May 18, 1925) was an American attorney and politician who served in the California State Senate representing the 12th district from 1899 to 1915. In 1914, he was the Democratic nominee for Governor of California, but lost to incumbent Hiram Johnson.

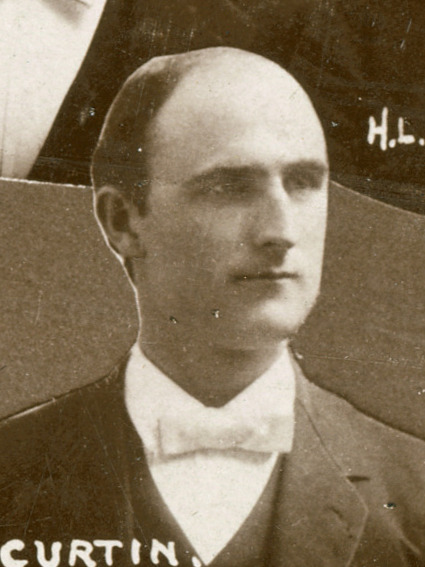
Curtin's official State Senate portrait, 1899

Curtin was a supporter of the Irish Home Rule movement, delivering a speech in the State Senate congratulating the Irish people following the passage of the Government of Ireland Act 1914.
