= Robert P. Shuler =

American evangelist (1880–1965)

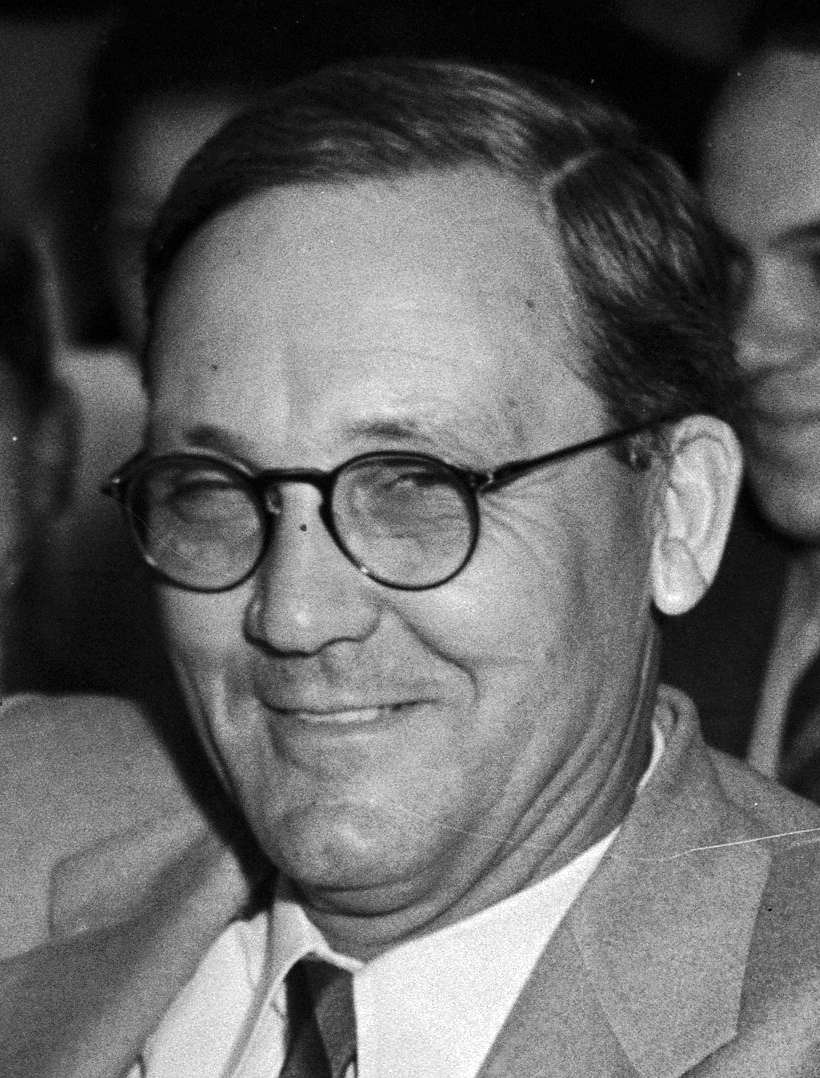
- Robert Pierce Shuler Sr, known as "Fighting Bob"
- Born: August 4, 1880; Grayson County, Virginia
- Died: September 11, 1965 (aged 85); Los Angeles, California
- Occupations: Pastor, evangelist
- Known for: Radio broadcasting, U.S. Senate candidacy

Robert Pierce Shuler Sr. (August 4, 1880 – September 11, 1965), also known as "Fighting Bob", was an American evangelist and political figure. His radio broadcasts from his Southern Methodist church in Los Angeles, California, during the 1920s and early 1930s attracted a large audience and also drew controversy with his attacks on politicians and police officials. In 1931, the Federal Radio Commission revoked Shuler's broadcast license due to his outspoken views. He ran for the United States Senate in 1932 on the Prohibition Party ticket and attracted more than 500,000 votes.

== Early years ==
Shuler was born in Grayson County, Virginia. He graduated from Emory and Henry College in 1903 and was ordained in the Methodist Episcopal Church, South. He served as a pastor at churches in Virginia, Tennessee and Texas before moving west to California.

== Pastor at Trinity Methodist Church in Los Angeles ==
It was in California that Shuler gained fame as the fiery pastor of Trinity Methodist Church, located at 1201 S. Flower St. in Downtown Los Angeles, from 1920 until 1953. Shuler acquired a wide following for his sermons and broadcasts in which he "thundered weekly against civic and moral evils", including gamblers, bootleggers, grafters, and above all corrupt politicians and police officials. From 1926-1932, Shuler operated radio station KGEF, which he said stood for "Keep God Ever First". He built the radio station at the site of Trinity Methodist Church, using funds donated by Methodist philanthropist Lizzie Glide, who also funded San Francisco's famous Glide Memorial Church. Shuler also published a magazine under the name Bob Shuler's Magazine. At his peak, Shuler's congregation had 5,000 members, and his radio broadcasts reportedly had an audience of 600,000 Southern Californians and were heard from Mexico to Canada.

American Mercury wrote that Shuler had "built up the greatest political and social power ever wielded by a man of God since the days of Savonarola in Florence." One historical account described Shuler's influence as follows:

Hyperbole aside, in the late 1920s and early 1930s, 'Fighting Bob' operated the most controversial religious radio station of all time. Politicians feared him, criminals avoided him, newspapers deplored him, and many ministers criticized him. But the public loved him, turning Shuler into a folk hero.

Shuler's controversial broadcasts included attacks on the president of the University of Southern California, for permitting evolution to be taught. In June 1930, the Los Angeles Times published a lengthy feature story about Shuler under the headline: "Champion 'Ag'inner' of Universe Is Shuler: Belligerent Local Pastor Holds All Records for Attacks Upon Everybody, Everything." The Times wrote: "Unless you have been attacked by Rev. 'Bob' Shuler, pastor of Trinity Methodist Church South, via radio, magazine, pulpit or pamphlet (25 cents per copy) you don't amount to much in Los Angeles." Shuler's targets included the Los Angeles Public Library (for carrying books not fit to be read even in "heathen China or anarchistic Russia"), the YWCA (for conducting dances for girls "until the early hours of Sunday morning"), and other evangelists, including Billy Sunday and Aimee Semple McPherson.

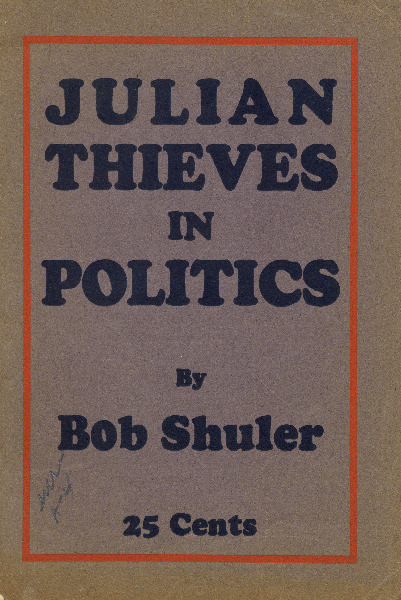
Shuler's Julian Thieves in Politics pamphlet drew connections between con man C. C. Julian and local politicians (University of Hawaiʻi at Mānoa Digital Collections)

== Crusade against vice ==
Shuler used his pulpit to make popular attacks on corruption in city government, the spread of vice and crime in the city, and abuses by the police department. He made common cause with other reform-minded Protestant clergy (in a city that was predominantly Protestant), becoming president of the Ministerial Union. Shuler and other Protestant ministers active in the reform and anti-vice movements had applied direct political pressure on both the mayor and the Chief of Police.

In 1923, Shuler went after Chief Louis D. Oaks of the Los Angeles Police Department. Sworn to uphold the law, including Prohibition, Oaks had a reputation as a hard-drinking womanizer who once was arrested in the backseat of an auto in the company of a half-naked woman and a bottle of contraband whiskey by San Bernardino. Shuler staked out a speakeasy and caught Chief Oaks leaving the establishment in an inebriated state accompanied by two women, neither of whom were his wife. After revealing publicly what he had seen (drinking being a crime during Prohibition), Oaks was ousted by Los Angeles Mayor George E. Cryer.

In 1929, Shuler focused his attacks on Cryer himself, whom Shuler branded as a "grafter" and the "chief exploiter", and whom he linked to the city's vice kingpin Charles H. Crawford. Shuler's charges, made both on his radio station and in his magazine, led to a widely publicized libel lawsuit by Cryer against Shuler. The details of the Shuler libel suit were front-page news in the Los Angeles Times for much of 1929. The jury found Shuler not guilty on one count and failed to reach a verdict on a second count.

In 1928 Shuler actively campaigned against the Democrat Party presidential nominee, Al Smith, warning the country that Smith would turn the nation into a Papal state. Shuler had long attacked Catholics, as well as Jews and persons of color. He accused the Papacy of introducing “beastism” into the United States and the Los Angeles District Attorney obtained an indictment against him for criminal libel. During his trial, Shuler called Pomona College history professor Frank W. Pitman to testify that Shuler’s words were found in medieval Catholic doctrine texts. A year later, after a mistrial, Shuler was acquitted in a second trial.

== KGEF license revocation ==
In November 1931, the Federal Radio Commission revoked Shuler's broadcast license, and KGEF went off the air. KGEF was the second radio station to have its license revoked by the FRC. Shuler appealed the revocation, but the United States Court of Appeals for the District of Columbia affirmed the decision. The court denounced the character of Shuler's broadcasts and declared that if such use of the airwaves were permitted, "radio will become a scourge and the nation a theater for the display of individual passions and the collision of personal interests." The U.S. Supreme Court denied Shuler's petition for a writ of certiorari, and his license revocation became final in February 1933. One of Shuler's recurring targets, the ACLU (which Shuler had regularly attacked for its "liberal" stands) supported Shuler's right to free speech and challenged the courts' decision to revoke his license. The Los Angeles Times, on the other hand, hailed the court's decision noting, "The final ruling of the courts putting an end to this nuisance is an occasion for general public felicitation."

== 1932 U.S. Senate campaign ==
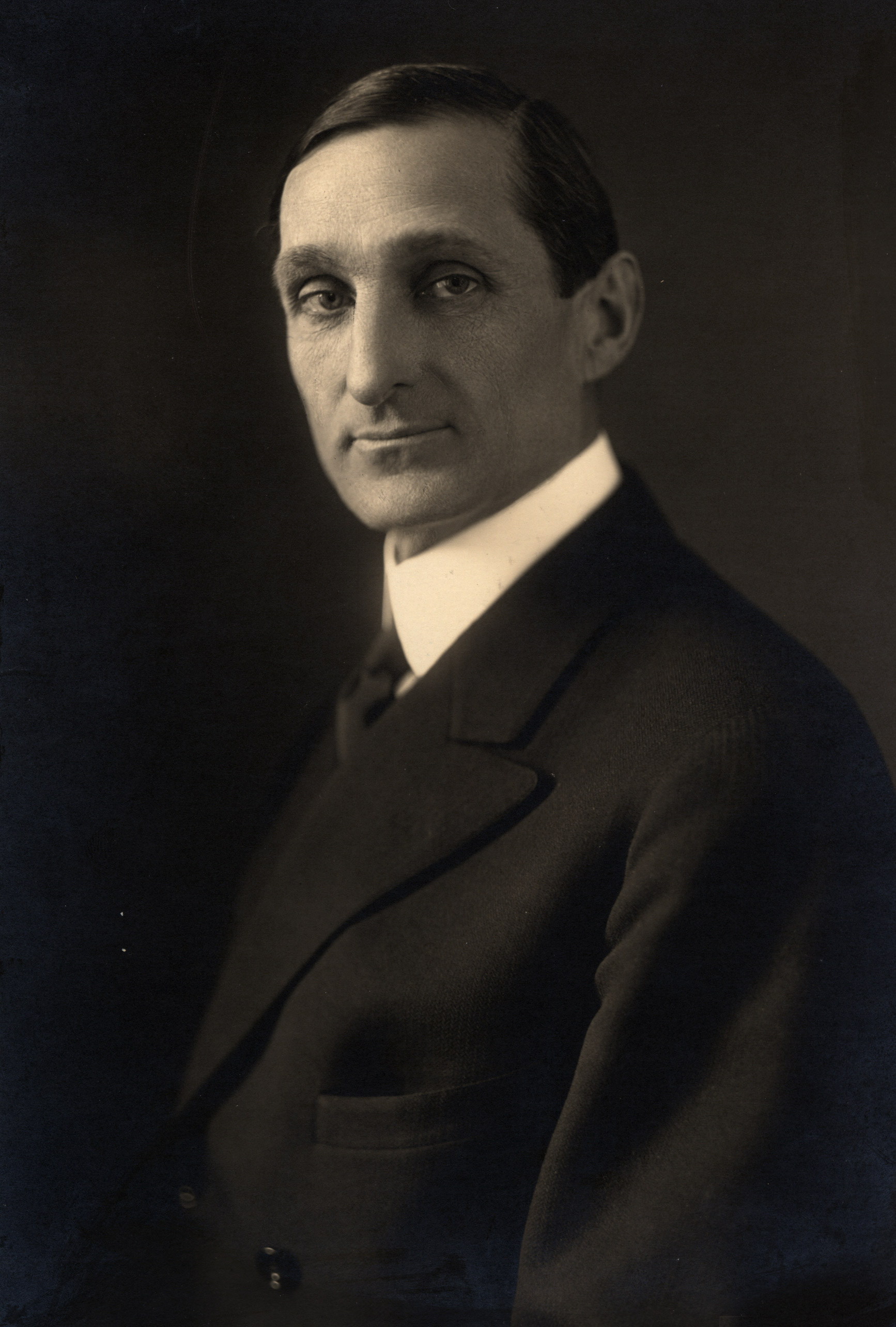
William Gibbs McAdoo, who won the 1932 California U.S. Senate election

By 1932, Shuler was a nationally known political and religious figure, and he announced his intention to run for the United States Senate. He was the Prohibition Party nominee in the 1932 Senate election against Democrat William G. McAdoo and Republican Tallant Tubbs. The Los Angeles Times refused to endorse any of the three candidates, calling it a "Hobson's choice" for voters, and criticizing Shuler for his "demagogic appeals to discontent." In a remarkable about-face, the Los Angeles Record endorsed Shuler on the day before the general election. The same newspaper had previously described Shuler as a "bigot," a "blatherskite," and an "apostle of hate." After a Shuler rally in Carlsbad, California, a San Diego County newspaper wrote that any who expected to hear a man with disheveled hair, wildly gleaming eyes and of radical mien and action," were surprised to hear "an average man, who spoke with a convincing earnestness." Shuler called Tubbs "a rich playboy" and McAdoo "the freest spender of the government's and the people's money in the history of government." Shuler freely admitted "I don't know what I'll do in Washington until I get there," but promised that he would be on the side of "the great mass of common people" and a fighter for "free speech, equal rights and justice for all."

In the general election, Shuler received 560,088 votes—25.8% of the total. He carried Orange and Riverside counties, and his total vote count was only 100,000 fewer than the Republican candidate, Tubbs, who finished second to McAdoo. Shuler's showing in the U.S. Senate campaign was the strongest ever by a Prohibition Party candidate, and led some to back him as the party's candidate for U.S. President in 1936.

After losing the election, Shuler reportedly pronounced a curse on the State of California, and some claimed that the March 1933 Long Beach earthquake was the result of Shuler's curse.

== 1942 U.S. Congressional campaign and FCC censorship claims ==
In 1942, Shuler returned to politics and received the joint nomination of the Prohibition and Republican parties as their choice to oppose Democratic incumbent Congressman Jerry Voorhis in California's 12th Congressional District. Voorhis defeated Shuler by a margin of nearly 13,000 votes (53,705 to 40,780).

Shortly after the election, Shuler's problems with federal regulators returned. Having lost his broadcast license for KGEF, Shuler was broadcasting his weekly programs on KPAS in Pasadena. In early 1943, the Federal Communications Commission (FCC) ordered KPAS to submit all recordings of Shuler's broadcasts. The FCC contended that Shuler's broadcasts hurt the war effort. Shuler was again taken off the air. He told the Los Angeles Times, "Well, I'd been going after the communists pretty hard -- and the labor racketeers and New Deal too. So all at once the Federal Communications Commission ordered the station to send in copies of all I'd been saying. The boys over there at the station are all right, but naturally they got jittery and canceled my time."

After the incident, Jerry Voorhis, against whom Shuler had run a tough campaign months earlier, rallied to Shuler's support. Voorhis wrote to the FCC disputing the contention that Shuler's comments were harmful to the war effort and argued that the FCC's threats of punitive action against stations carrying Shuler's program were an inappropriate restraint on free speech. In 1946, Voorhis was defeated for re-election by novice politician Richard M. Nixon, who accused Voorhis of having been endorsed by Communist-front organizations.

== Retirement and family ==
In 1953, Shuler retired after 33 years as pastor at Trinity Methodist Church. In his final sermon, Shuler spoke out against the "German rationalism" and "modern materialism" that he believed was "wrecking the world". He summed up his ministry as follows:

I have kept the faith. I fought. I have been a scrapper for God. I have never laid my shield aside -- and I'm not doing it now, either. ... As I come to the end of my ministry I can assure you that I have never swerved to the right or left of the fundamental Word of God.

Shuler died in Los Angeles on September 11, 1965. He was survived by his wife, Nelle Shuler, and his seven children—Jack C. Shuler, William R. Shuler, Robert P. Shuler Jr., Edward H. Shuler, Phil R. Shuler, Dorothy Pitkin, and Nelle Fertig. Bill was the captain of the Army football team in 1935 and was named an All-American at the end position, while Robert Jr. assumed the Trinity Methodist Church pastorate after the elder Shuler's retirement. Jack was a well known evangelist who held large meetings throughout the United States, Canada, and Ireland in the 1940s and 1950s.

== See also ==
- List of Christian pastors in politics
- Fundamentalist–Modernist Controversy
- Prohibition Party
