= William Waldo (California politician) =

American politician

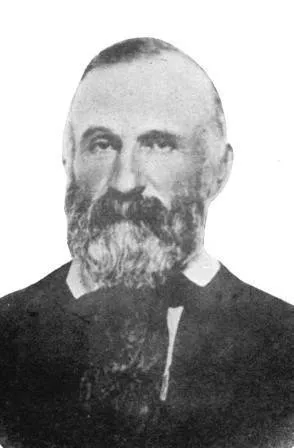
- Born: January 16, 1812; Harrison County, Virginia
- Died: November 2, 1881 (aged 69); Sutherland Springs, Texas
- Occupation: Sea captain
- Political party: Whig

William Waldo (January 16, 1812 – November 2, 1881) was a candidate for Governor of California in 1853. He was born in Harrison County, Virginia (now part of West Virginia) but spent most of his life in Missouri, where he was a merchant and steamboat captain. In 1849 he joined the gold rush to California at the head of a wagon train. In California the next year, reports arrived of impending starvation among numerous immigrants on the Nevada side of the Sierra Nevada mountains. Waldo put great effort into recruiting and delivering supplies for them, and became well known for his relief attempts. In 1853 the Whig party nominated Waldo as their candidate for Governor, but he narrowly lost to the incumbent John Bigler. Following his defeat, he returned east, first to Minnesota and then back to Missouri where his wife and children had remained. In his later years he moved to Texas, where he died.

William Waldo is said to be the namesake of Waldo, Oregon where he accidentally campaigned, believing the settlement was in California, and of Waldo Point near Sausalito, California. He was the brother of Oregon politician Daniel Waldo.

== See also ==
- Waldo Grade
- 1853 California gubernatorial election

Party political offices
Preceded by Pierson B. Reading	Whig nominee for Governor of California; 1853	Succeeded by None
