= 1853 California gubernatorial election =

- September 7, 1853
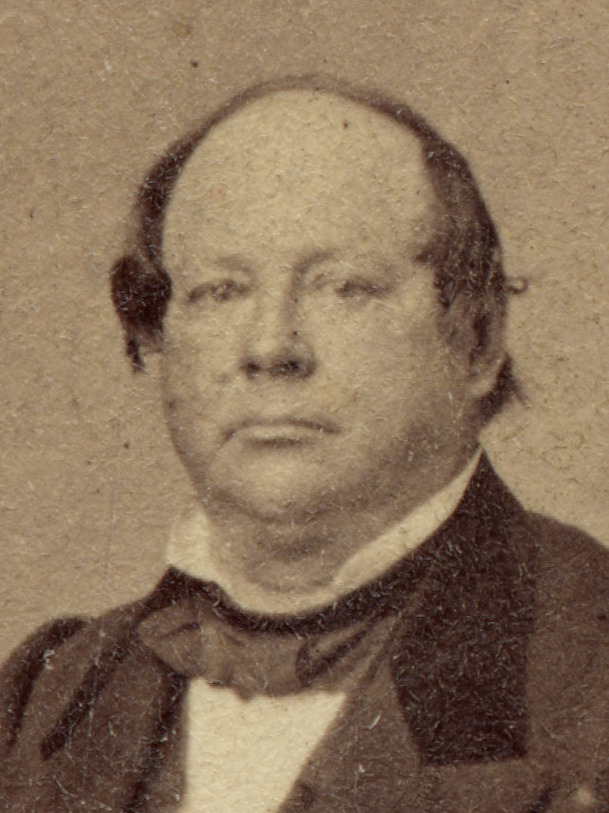

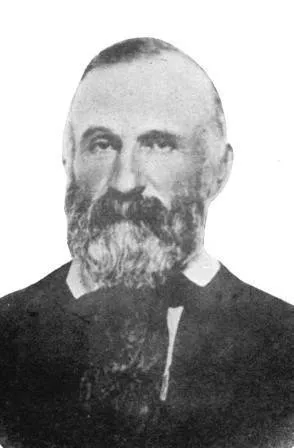
Nominee	John Bigler	William Waldo
Party	Democratic	Whig
Popular vote	38,940	37,454
Percentage	50.97%	49.03%
- County results Bigler: 50–60% 60–70% 70–80% 90–100% Waldo: 50–60% 60–70% 90–100% No Data/Vote
Governor before election
John Bigler
Democratic
Elected Governor
John Bigler
Democratic

The 1853 California gubernatorial election was held on September 7, 1853, to elect the governor of California. Incumbent governor John Bigler successfully ran for reelection, winning over Whig nominee William Waldo in a close race.

== Results ==
California gubernatorial election, 1853
Party	Candidate	Votes	%	±%
Democratic	John Bigler (incumbent)	38,940	50.97	+0.49%
Whig	William Waldo	37,454	49.03	−0.49%
Majority		1,486	1.95%	
Total votes		76,394	100.00%	
Democratic hold		Swing	+0.99%	

=== Results by county ===
County	John Bigler Democratic		William Waldo Whig		Margin		Total votes cast
County	#	%	#	%	#	%	Total votes cast
Alameda	551	56.86%	418	43.14%	133	13.73%	969
Butte	1,544	48.45%	1,643	51.55%	-99	-3.11%	3,187
Calaveras	2,545	53.50%	2,212	46.50%	333	7.00%	4,757
Colusa	165	38.73%	261	61.27%	-96	-22.54%	426
Contra Costa	324	49.85%	326	50.15%	-2	-0.31%	650
El Dorado	4,373	50.90%	4,219	49.10%	154	1.79%	8,592
Humboldt	233	48.95%	243	51.05%	-10	-2.10%	476
Klamath	387	46.13%	452	53.87%	-65	-7.75%	839
Los Angeles	477	68.14%	223	31.86%	254	36.29%	700
Marin	218	40.45%	321	59.55%	-103	-19.11%	539
Mariposa	845	51.06%	810	48.94%	35	2.11%	1,655
Monterey	255	74.56%	87	25.44%	168	49.12%	342
Napa	173	30.57%	393	69.43%	-220	-38.87%	566
Nevada	2,311	51.47%	2,179	48.53%	132	2.94%	4,490
Placer	1,929	53.21%	1,696	46.79%	233	6.43%	3,625
Sacramento	3,276	49.65%	3,322	50.35%	-46	-0.70%	6,598
San Bernardino	253	99.22%	2	0.78%	251	98.43%	255
San Diego	74	42.53%	100	57.47%	-26	-14.94%	174
San Francisco	5,480	50.02%	5,475	49.98%	5	0.05%	10,955
San Joaquin	1,250	51.44%	1,180	48.56%	70	2.88%	2,430
San Luis Obispo	9	6.16%	137	93.84%	-128	-87.67%	146
Santa Barbara	184	64.11%	103	35.89%	81	28.22%	287
Santa Clara	598	33.33%	1,196	66.67%	-598	-33.33%	1,794
Santa Cruz	341	44.29%	429	55.71%	-88	-11.43%	770
Shasta	817	52.44%	741	47.56%	76	4.88%	1,558
Sierra	1,906	55.71%	1,515	44.29%	391	11.43%	3,421
Siskiyou	819	56.33%	635	43.67%	184	12.65%	1,454
Solano	541	50.42%	532	49.58%	9	0.84%	1,073
Sonoma	404	38.66%	641	61.34%	-237	-22.68%	1,045
Sutter	253	51.32%	240	48.68%	13	2.64%	493
Trinity	748	56.28%	581	43.72%	167	12.57%	1,329
Tulare	54	66.67%	27	33.33%	27	33.33%	81
Tuolumne	2,759	53.92%	2,358	46.08%	401	7.84%	5,117
Yolo	434	47.90%	472	52.10%	-38	-4.19%	906
Yuba	2,410	51.33%	2,285	48.67%	125	2.66%	4,695
Total	38,940	50.97%	37,454	49.03%	1,486	1.95%	76,394

==== Counties that flipped from Whig to Democratic ====
- Los Angeles
- San Francisco
- Santa Barbara
- Solano

==== Counties that flipped from Democratic to Whig ====
- Butte
- Sacramento
- San Diego
- Yolo
