= 1855 California gubernatorial election =

- September 5, 1855
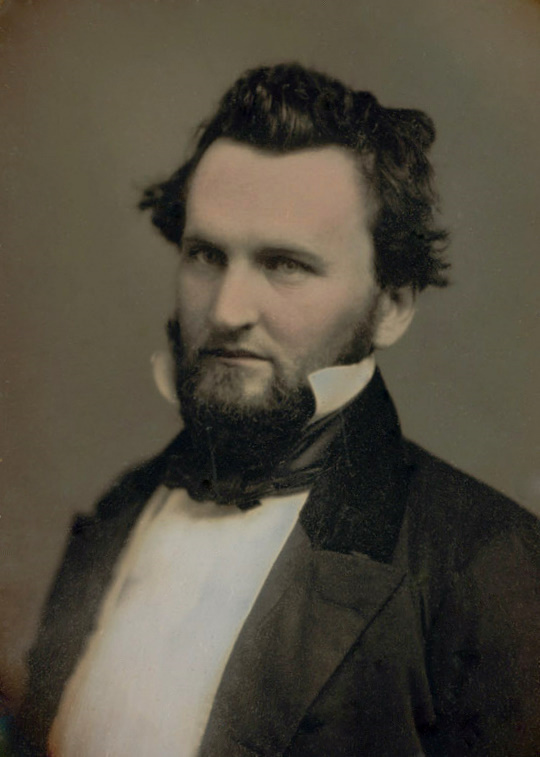

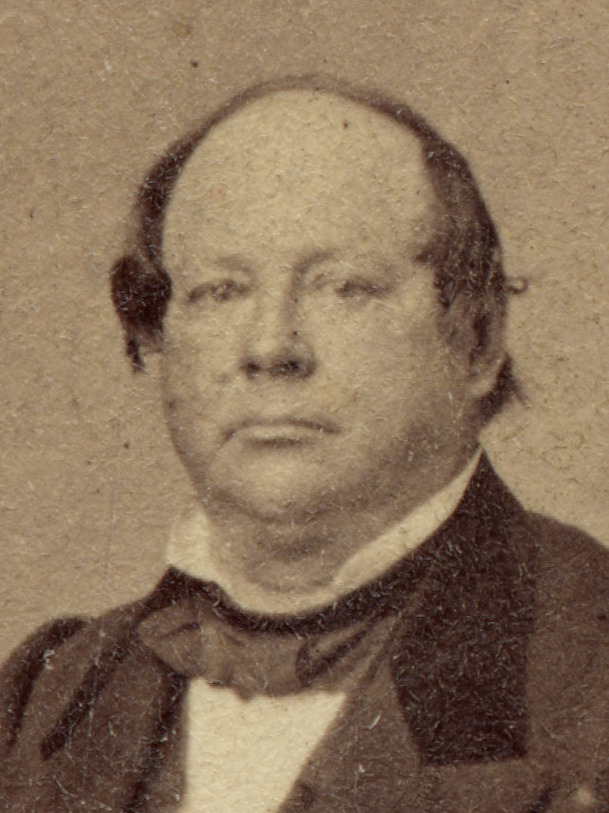
Nominee	J. Neely Johnson	John Bigler
Party	Know Nothing	Democratic
Popular vote	51,157	46,220
Percentage	52.52%	47.45%
- County results Johnson: 50–60% 60–70% 70–80% Bigler: 50–60% 60–70% 70–80% 80–90% >90%
Governor before election
John Bigler
Democratic
Elected Governor
J. Neely Johnson
Know Nothing

The 1855 California gubernatorial election was held on September 5, 1855, to elect the governor of California. Incumbent governor John Bigler lost his bid for reelection.

== Results ==
California gubernatorial election, 1855
Party	Candidate	Votes	%	±%
Know Nothing	J. Neely Johnson	51,157	52.52%	+52.52%
Democratic	John Bigler (incumbent)	46,220	47.45%	−3.52%
	Scattering	21	0.02%	
Majority		4,937	5.07%	
Total votes		97,398	100.00%	
Know Nothing gain from Democratic		Swing	+7.01%	

=== Results by county ===
County	J. Neely Johnson Know Nothing		John Bigler Democratic		Scattering Write-in		Margin		Total votes cast
County	#	%	#	%	#	%	#	%	Total votes cast
Alameda	625	36.49%	1,088	63.51%	0	0.00%	-463	-27.03%	1,713
Amador	2,035	54.21%	1,719	45.79%	0	0.00%	316	8.42%	3,754
Butte	1,694	54.56%	1,411	45.44%	0	0.00%	283	9.11%	3,105
Calaveras	2,186	49.61%	2,220	50.39%	0	0.00%	-34	-0.77%	4,406
Colusa	359	55.92%	283	44.08%	0	0.00%	76	11.84%	642
Contra Costa	360	46.94%	407	53.06%	0	0.00%	-47	-6.13%	767
El Dorado	4,929	55.51%	3,948	44.46%	3	0.03%	981	11.05%	8,880
Humboldt	282	78.55%	77	21.45%	0	0.00%	205	57.10%	359
Klamath	545	53.07%	482	46.93%	0	0.00%	63	6.13%	1,027
Los Angeles	556	37.59%	923	62.41%	0	0.00%	-367	-24.81%	1,479
Marin	173	34.19%	333	65.81%	0	0.00%	-160	-31.62%	506
Mariposa	1,255	56.56%	964	43.44%	0	0.00%	291	13.11%	2,219
Merced	102	54.55%	85	45.45%	0	0.00%	17	9.09%	187
Monterey	485	72.93%	180	27.07%	0	0.00%	305	45.86%	665
Napa	519	66.54%	261	33.46%	0	0.00%	258	33.08%	780
Nevada	2,861	53.32%	2,502	46.63%	3	0.06%	359	6.69%	5,366
Placer	3,128	57.50%	2,312	42.50%	0	0.00%	816	15.00%	5,440
Plumas	1,111	60.15%	736	39.85%	0	0.00%	375	20.30%	1,847
Sacramento	3,544	54.89%	2,912	45.11%	0	0.00%	632	9.79%	6,456
San Bernardino	14	4.05%	332	95.95%	0	0.00%	-318	-91.91%	346
San Diego	17	7.66%	204	91.89%	1	0.45%	-187	-84.23%	222
San Francisco	5,213	42.21%	7,138	57.79%	0	0.00%	-1,925	-15.59%	12,351
San Joaquin	1,447	58.51%	1,026	41.49%	0	0.00%	421	17.02%	2,473
San Luis Obispo	45	27.61%	118	72.39%	0	0.00%	-73	-44.79%	163
Santa Barbara	39	10.46%	333	89.28%	1	0.27%	-294	-78.82%	373
Santa Clara	1,135	53.14%	994	46.54%	7	0.33%	141	6.60%	2,136
Santa Cruz	347	57.64%	255	42.36%	0	0.00%	92	15.28%	602
Shasta	1,418	52.11%	1,302	47.85%	1	0.04%	116	4.26%	2,721
Sierra	3,070	58.83%	2,148	41.17%	0	0.00%	922	17.67%	5,218
Siskiyou	2,045	59.92%	1,368	40.08%	0	0.00%	677	19.84%	3,413
Solano	753	56.03%	591	43.97%	0	0.00%	162	12.05%	1,344
Sonoma	892	48.82%	933	51.07%	2	0.11%	-41	-2.24%	1,827
Stanislaus	225	42.94%	299	57.06%	0	0.00%	-74	-14.12%	524
Sutter	340	47.16%	381	52.84%	0	0.00%	-41	-5.69%	721
Trinity	1,132	68.65%	517	31.35%	0	0.00%	615	37.30%	1,649
Tulare	140	40.70%	204	59.30%	0	0.00%	-64	-18.60%	344
Tuolumne	2,805	53.95%	2,391	45.99%	3	0.06%	414	7.96%	5,199
Yolo	603	51.85%	560	48.15%	0	0.00%	43	3.70%	1,163
Yuba	2,728	54.44%	2,283	45.56%	0	0.00%	445	8.88%	5,011
Total	51,157	52.52%	46,220	47.45%	21	0.02%	4,937	5.07%	97,398

==== Counties that flipped from Democratic to Know Nothing ====
- El Dorado
- Mariposa
- Monterey
- Nevada
- Placer
- San Joaquin
- Shasta
- Sierra
- Siskiyou
- Solano
- Trinity
- Tuolumne
- Yuba

==== Counties that flipped from Whig to Know Nothing ====
- Butte
- Colusa
- Humboldt
- Klamath
- Napa
- Sacramento
- Santa Clara
- Santa Cruz
- Yolo

==== Counties that flipped from Whig to Democratic ====
- Contra Costa
- Marin
- San Diego
- San Luis Obispo
- Sonoma
