= John Bigler =

American politician

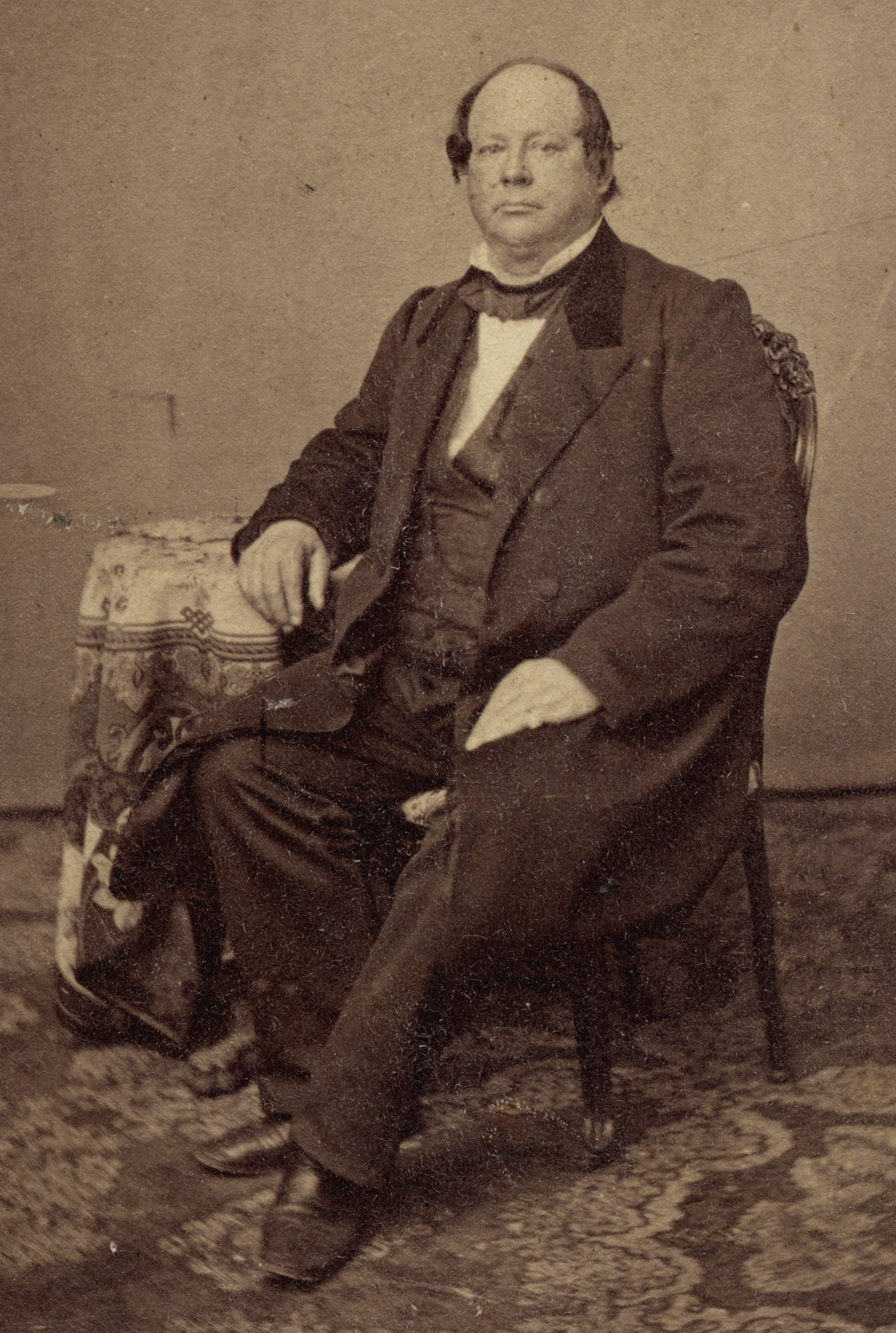
- Bigler in 1850

9th United States Ambassador to Chile
- In office October 5, 1857 – October 4, 1861
- Preceded by: David A. Starkweather
- Succeeded by: Thomas H. Nelson

3rd Governor of California
- In office January 8, 1852 – January 9, 1856
- Lieutenant: Samuel Purdy
- Preceded by: John McDougal
- Succeeded by: J. Neely Johnson

2nd Speaker of the California State Assembly
- In office February 1850 – May 1851
- Preceded by: Thomas J. White
- Succeeded by: Richard P. Hammond

Member of the California State Assembly
- In office December 17, 1849 – January 5, 1852
- Preceded by: Constituency established
- Succeeded by: Multi-member district
- Constituency: Sacramento district (1849–1851); 12th district (1851–1852)

Personal details
- Born: January 8, 1805 Carlisle, Pennsylvania, U.S.
- Died: November 29, 1871 (aged 66) Sacramento, California, U.S.
- Party: Democratic
- Spouse: Elizabeth Bigler
- Children: Virginia
- Profession: Editor, lawyer, politician

John Bigler (January 8, 1805 – November 29, 1871) was an American lawyer, politician and diplomat. A Democrat, he served as the third governor of California from 1852 to 1856 and was the first California governor to complete an entire term in office, as well as the first to win re-election. His younger brother, William Bigler, was elected governor of Pennsylvania during the same period. Bigler was also appointed by President James Buchanan as the U.S. Minister to Chile from 1857 to 1861.

== Biography ==
Bigler was born in early 1805 in Carlisle, Pennsylvania. Beginning work in the printing trade at an early age, Bigler, as well as his younger brother, William, never received a formal education, yet Bigler took it upon himself to educate his younger brother. In 1831, both brothers moved to Bellefonte in Centre County to buy the local Andrew Jackson-affiliated Centre Democrat newspaper, where older John assumed editorial duties. Bigler worked as editor until 1835, when he sold the publication to study law.

When news of the California gold rush reached the East Coast in mid-1848, Bigler, now a middle-aged lawyer, decided to leave for the West Coast to join a law practice. Travelling overland with an ox train, Bigler reached Sacramento in 1849, only to quickly discover that there were no open positions in law. Bigler began to work at a series of odd jobs, including becoming an auctioneer, a wood chopper, and a freight unloader at the town's docks along the Sacramento River. Upon hearing of the territory's first general election in the same year, Bigler decided to turn to politics, and entered the California State Assembly as a Democrat, one of nine members representing the Sacramento district.

== Political career ==
Upon being elected to the first session of the California State Legislature in 1849, Bigler enjoyed a rapid rise to power in the Assembly. Within a year, Bigler was voted by the heavily Democratic majority in the body as the Speaker of the Assembly in February 1850. Now one of the most powerful legislators in the state, Bigler enjoyed widespread name recognition. During the Sacramento cholera epidemic of October 1850, Bigler contracted cholera as a direct result of his remaining in the city and assisting doctors and undertakers.

In May 1851, Bigler was nominated by the Democratic Party convention in Benicia as the party's choice for governor in California's first general election after achieving statehood. Bigler's challenger, the Whig Party's Pierson B. Reading, derided Bigler as an unpolished, gruff Yankee Northerner, while Reading articulated himself as an educated pioneering gentleman of the South.

Bigler ran on an explicitly anti-Chinese platform. He won the election by little more than a thousand votes over Reading, which remains today as the closest gubernatorial election in California history.

== Governorship ==
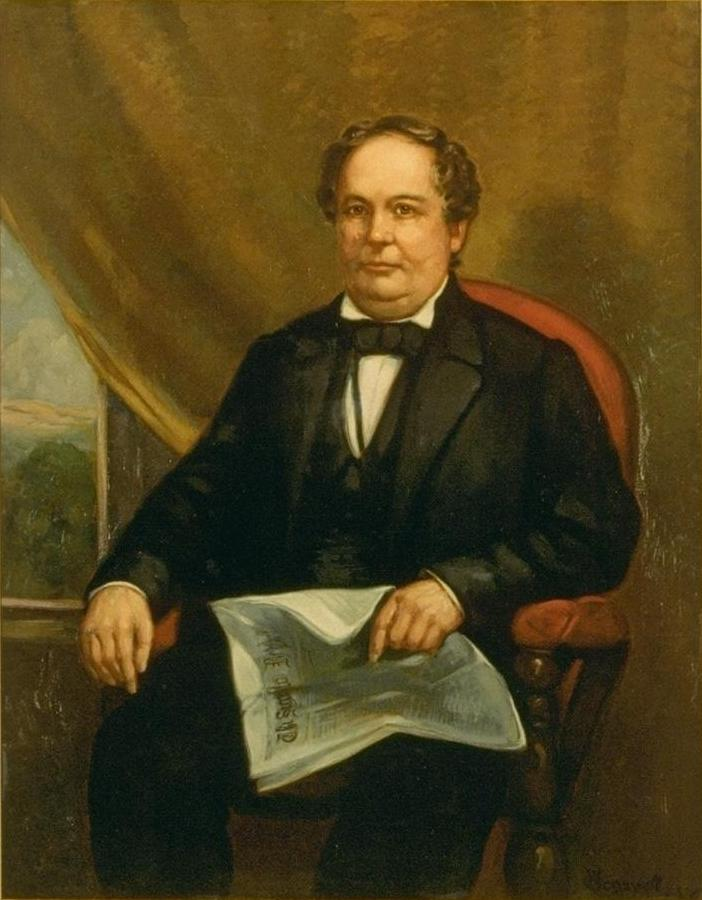
Portrait of Bigler by William F. Cogswell

Upon assuming the governorship on January 8, 1852, Bigler established his priorities to protect the state's highly profitable mining interests from leasing or outside monopolies, declaring in his first inaugural address that these mining interests should be "left as free as the air we breathe." Bigler also prioritized the industrialization of California, encouraging industrial investment on behalf of the state government.

=== Actions against Native Americans and the Chinese ===
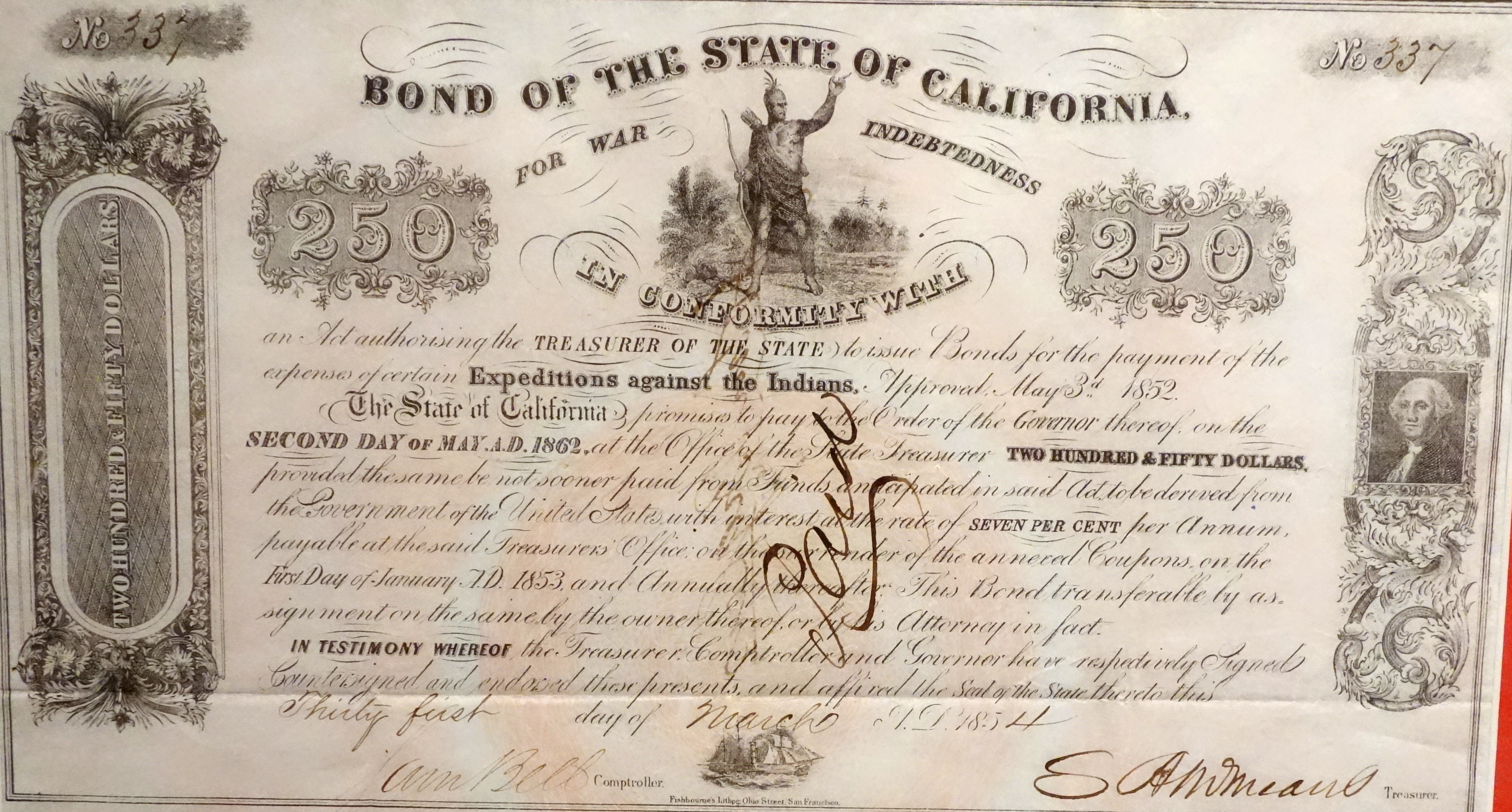
Bond for "War Indebtedness" used to pay for "Expeditions against the Indians", signed by Governor John Bigler on March 31, 1854

On March 31, 1854, Bigler approved issuance of a bond entitled "Bond of the State of California for War Indebtedness", used to pay expenses for "expeditions against the Indians." It was signed by Bigler, State Comptroller Samuel Bell and State Treasurer Selden A. McMeans. This bond is exhibited in the Oakland Museum of California.

Bigler also enacted a policy to prevent Chinese "coolie" immigrants from entering California. Bigler claimed that the Chinese refused to and could never assimilate into American society, and he also used the immigrants' willingness to work for little pay as a way to urge Californians to "check this tide of Asiatic immigration." While the previous administration of Governor John McDougall somewhat supported the Chinese presence in the state, Bigler advocated the revival of the 1850 Foreign Miners Tax, originally signed by anti-foreigner Governor Peter Burnett. Whereas the original 1850 law placed a US$20 per month tax on all miners of foreign origin, the Bigler-supported 1852 version of the law placed a US$3 per month tax exclusively for Chinese laborers. Over the course of his two terms in office, taxes for Chinese immigrants steadily increased, with ever harsher bills passing the Legislature and signed into law by Governor Bigler. One law passed by the Legislature and signed by the Governor created a US$50 tax per head (to be paid within three days) for Chinese entering Californian ports. The California Supreme Court later ruled the law unconstitutional.

As Sierra Nevada gold mine output slowed to a trickle by the early 1850s, followed by local financial panic caused by the discovery of gold in Australia, anger towards hard-working and labor-cheap Chinese grew, especially among economically pressured miners, who desperately sought alternative work in California's cities and ports. While Bigler aligned himself with popular anti-immigrant and anti-Chinese sentiment, these constituents would later split from the Democrats and spill over into the anti-immigrant American Know-Nothing Party.

Opposition to the constriction of Chinese immigration was voiced by Norman Asing, a leader in San Francisco's Chinese community, in an open letter published in 1852. He argued that "we are not the degraded race you would make us" and that "...when your nation was a wilderness, and the nation from which you sprung barbarous, we exercised most of the arts and virtues of civilized life;" therefore, the Chinese should be free to contribute productively to the US.

=== Free Soil period ===
Pressure was also mounting on the Democratic Party itself in California in regards to slavery. By the 1853 general election campaign, large majorities of pro-slavery Democrats from Southern California, calling themselves the Chivalry (later branded as Lecompton Democrats), threatened to divide the state in half should the state not accept slavery. Bigler, along with former State Senator and Lieutenant Governor David C. Broderick from the previous McDougal administration, formed the Free Soil Democratic faction, modeled after the federal Free Soil Party that argued against the spread of slavery. The Democrats effectively split into two camps, with both the Chivalry and Free Soilers nominating their own candidates for the 1853 election. Despite the party split, Bigler was able to overcome Whig Party challenger William Waldo and became the first California governor to win a second term in office. No other governor of the state would win a second term until Hiram Johnson in 1914.

=== Moving the capital ===
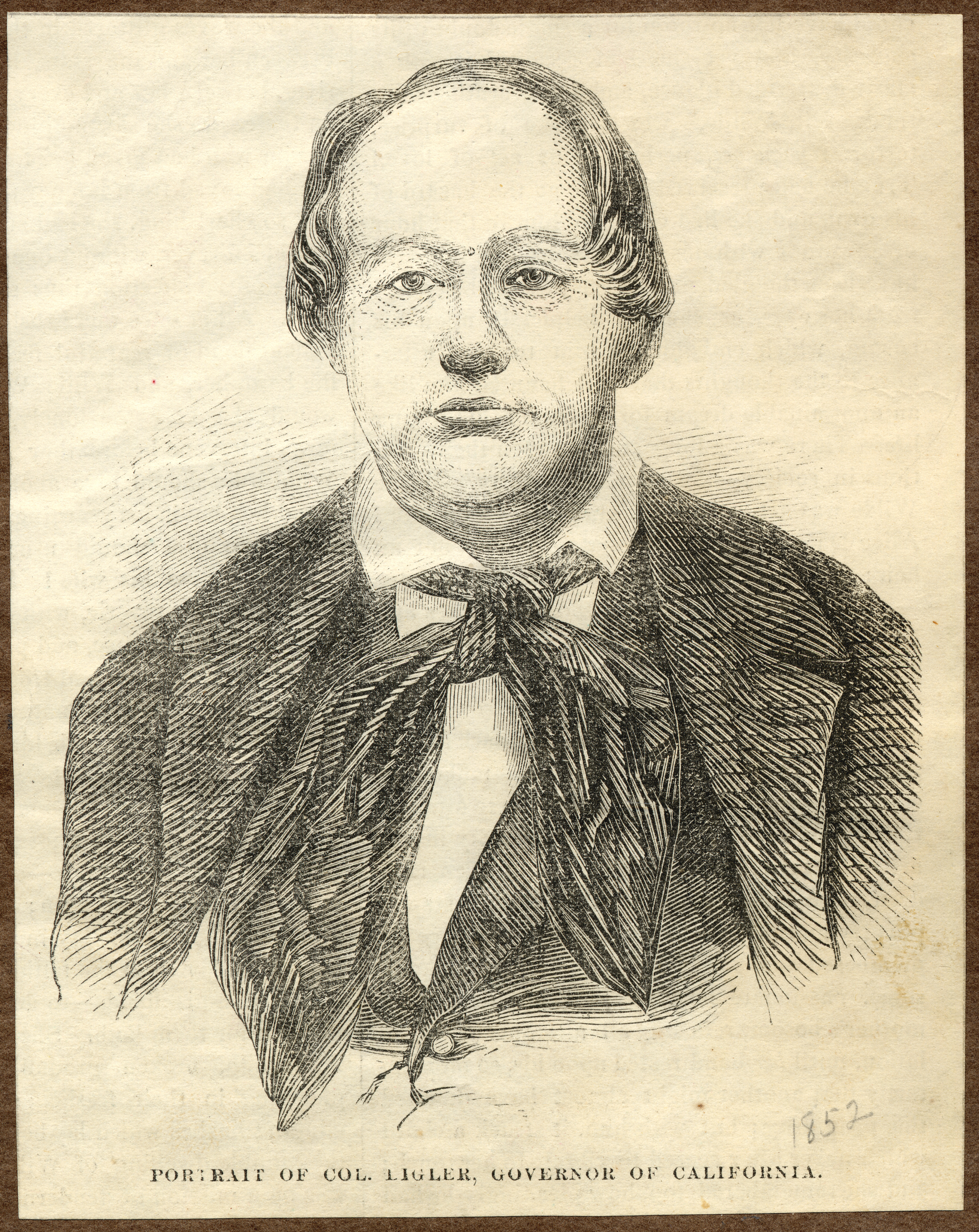
Portrait of Col. Bigler, Governor of California, 1852

During Bigler's tenure, the state government struggled to find a permanent location for a capital or a capitol building. State Senator Mariano Vallejo's promises of Vallejo as being an ideal capital city failed to materialize. For one miserable week in early 1852, the California State Legislature met in the township, quickly discovering the lack of facilities, supplies and furniture. With the suggestion of Bigler and support from city government leaders, the Legislature would temporarily relocate to his adopted city of Sacramento, while Vallejo would remain the permanent capital. However, after flooding problems in Sacramento, and dire weather conditions in Vallejo, the Legislature and Bigler agreed to relocate the capital to nearby Benicia. Conditions in Benicia also proved poor for state bureaucrats. Sacramento offered its services again as a capital, and on February 25, 1854, Governor Bigler signed a law making Sacramento the capital of California. With the exception of a temporary move to San Francisco in 1862 while Sacramento was again flooded, the capital has stayed there since.

Bigler's popularity peaked around 1854 to 1855. For the 1855 general election, the Democratic Party renominated Bigler in his bid to gain a third term of office. However, his monopoly on anti-immigrant sentiment began to lose ground. Growing economic troubles due to the slow collapse of gold mining in the Sierras and other gold discoveries in Australia, as well as failures to solve growing state financial debt led to popular discontent with infrastructure and fiscal management within his administration. Bigler's administration had attained a general perception of fiscal extravagance among the public. Bigler urged adoption of measures to secure for San Francisco the benefits of the whale trade of the Pacific. The anti-immigrant and Nativist American Know-Nothing Party, led by its nominee, former Whig J. Neely Johnson, defeated Bigler by a moderate margin during the 1855 election. Bigler was the first California governor to be defeated in a general election.

== Post governorship career ==
Following his defeat in the 1855 election, Bigler's career turned to diplomacy. In 1857, at the insistence of his brother, Pennsylvania Governor William Bigler, President James Buchanan appointed Bigler as U.S. Minister to Chile. Following the completion of his foreign assignment, Bigler re-entered politics, this time on the federal level. Bigler ran as a Southern-friendly Independent for Congress in the 1863 elections, yet failed to win. In 1866, President Andrew Johnson nominated Bigler as the Internal Revenue Service's Federal Assessor for the Sacramento district, but due to open animosity between Congress and President Johnson at the time, the U.S. Senate never confirmed the nomination, and thus Bigler never took the position.

In 1867, Bigler was appointed railroad commissioner for the Central Pacific Railroad. In 1868, he founded the State Capitol Reporter and served as its editor until his death in Sacramento on November 29, 1871, at the age of 66. He is interred in the Sacramento Historic City Cemetery.

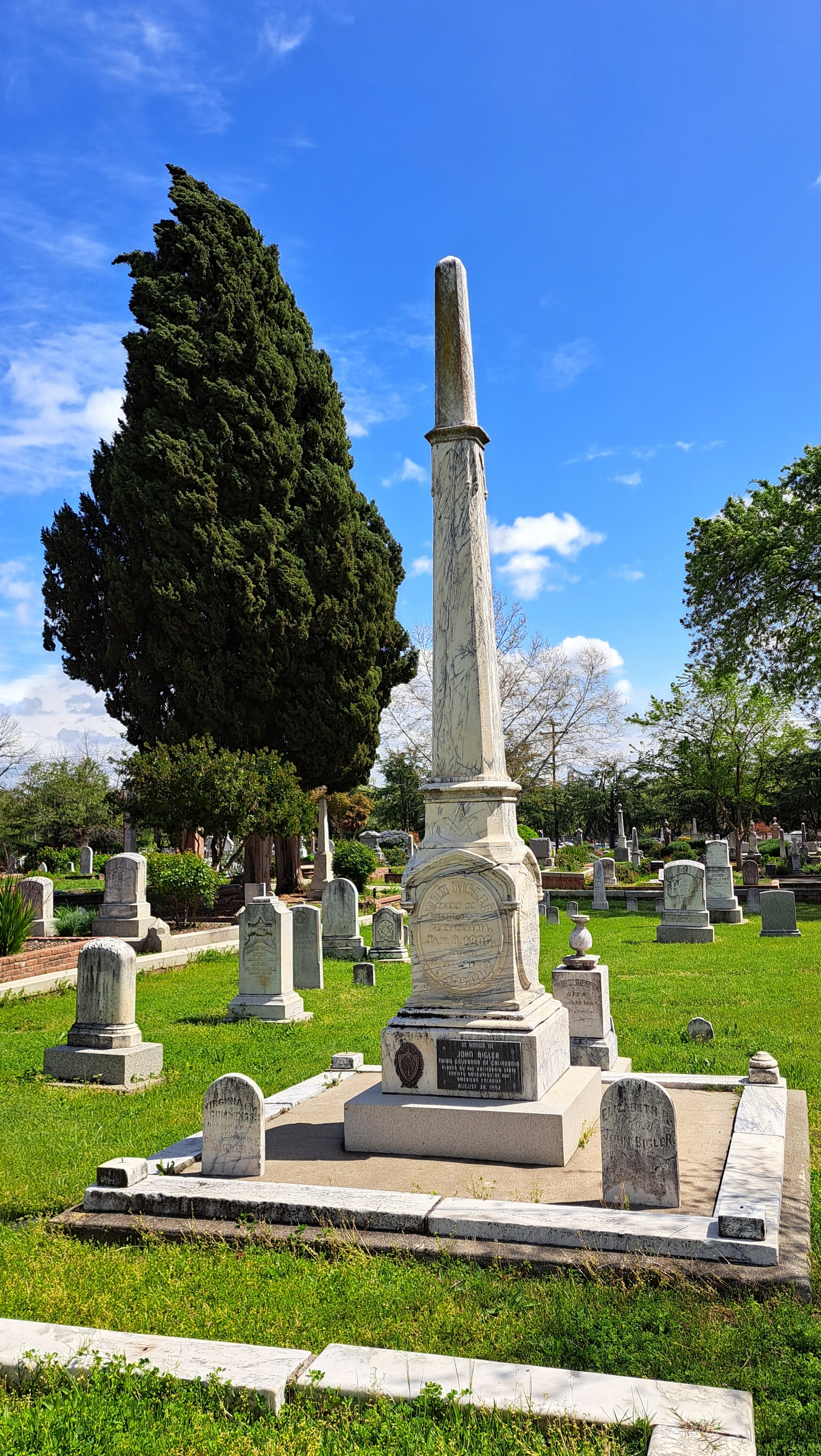
This is the grave of California Governor John Bigler at the Sacramento Historic City Cemetery.

== Lake Tahoe/Lake Bigler ==
At the height of his popularity in 1854, the Democratic majority State Legislature named modern-day Lake Tahoe "Lake Bigler" in honor of California's third Governor, who was then beginning his second term. For nearly ten years, the name of the lake had been in dispute. John C. Fremont, one of the lake's first White discoverers in 1844, named it "Lake Bonpland" after Aimé Jacques Alexandre Bonpland, a French botanist who had accompanied Prussian explorer Alexander von Humboldt in his exploration of Mexico, Colombia and the Amazon River. Lake Bonpland's usage never became popular, with the lake's name changing from "Mountain Lake" to "Fremont's Lake“ several years after. By 1853, the name "Lake Bigler" began to be applied to maps of the lake after the then-popular California governor. The state legislature officially changed the name the following year."

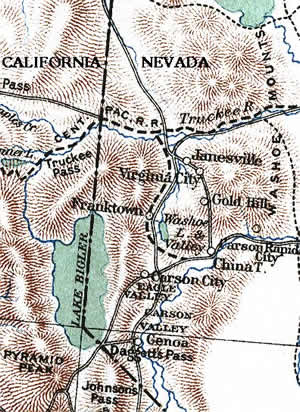
An 1860s map of "Lake Bigler" during the name controversy

Lake Bigler's usage never became universal. In just a year, different maps referred to the lake not only as Bigler, but also as "Mountain Lake" to "Maheon Lake." By 1861, at the start of the American Civil War, former Governor Bigler, once a Free Soil Democrat, had become an ardent Confederate sympathizer. Unionists and Republicans alike derided the former governor's name on the lake on official state maps. Pro-Union papers called for a "change from this Secesh appellation" and "no Copperhead names on our landmarks for us." Several Unionist members in the Legislature suggested changing the name to the fanciful sounding "Tula Tulia." The Sacramento Union jokingly suggested the name "Largo Bergler" for Bigler's widely perceived financial incompetency in his final term and contemporary Southern sympathies.

The debate took a new direction when William Henry Knight, mapmaker for the federal U.S. Department of the Interior, and colleague Dr. Henry DeGroot of the Sacramento Union joined the political argument in 1862. As Knight completed a new map of the lake, the mapmaker asked DeGroot for a new name of the lake. DeGroot suggested "Tahoe," a local tribal name he believed meant "water in a high place." Knight agreed, and telegraphed to the Land Office in Washington, D.C., to officially change all federal maps to now read "Lake Tahoe." Knight later explained his desire for a name change, writing, "I remarked (to many) that people had expressed dissatisfaction with the name "Bigler", bestowed in honor of a man who had not distinguished himself by any single achievement, and I thought now would be a good time to select an appropriate name and fix it forever on that beautiful sheet of water."

"Lake Tahoe," also like "Lake Bigler," did not gain universal acceptance. Mark Twain, a critic of the new name, called it an "unmusical cognomen." In an 1864 editorial regarding the name in the Virginia City Territorial Enterprise, Twain cited Bigler as being "the legitimate name of the Lake, and it will be retained until some name less flat, insipid and spooney than "Tahoe" is invented for it." In Twain's 1869 novel Innocents Abroad, Twain continued to deride the name in his foreign travels. "People say that Tahoe means 'Silver Lake' - 'Limpid Water' - 'Falling Leaf.' Bosh! It means grasshopper soup, the favorite dish of the digger tribe - and of the Paiutes as well." The Placerville Mountain Democrat began a notorious rumor that "Tahoe" was actually an Indian renegade who plundered upon White settlers. To counter the federal government, the California State Legislature reaffirmed in 1870 that the lake was indeed called "Lake Bigler."

By the end of the 19th century, usage of "Lake Bigler" had nearly completely fallen out of popular vocabulary in favor of "Tahoe." The California State Legislature officially reversed its previous decision in 1945, officially changing the name to Lake Tahoe.

Party political offices
First	Democratic nominee for Governor of California; 1851, 1853, 1855	Succeeded by John B. Weller
California Assembly
Preceded by First Legislature	California State Assemblyman, Sacramento District; 1849–1851 (with eight others)	Succeeded by Numbered districts established
Preceded by District created	California State Assemblyman, 12th District; 1851–1852 (with Daniel J. Lisle, Charles Robinson)	Succeeded by Four members
Political offices
Preceded by John McDougal	Governor of California; 1852–1856	Succeeded by J. Neely Johnson
