= Tallant Tubbs =

American politician

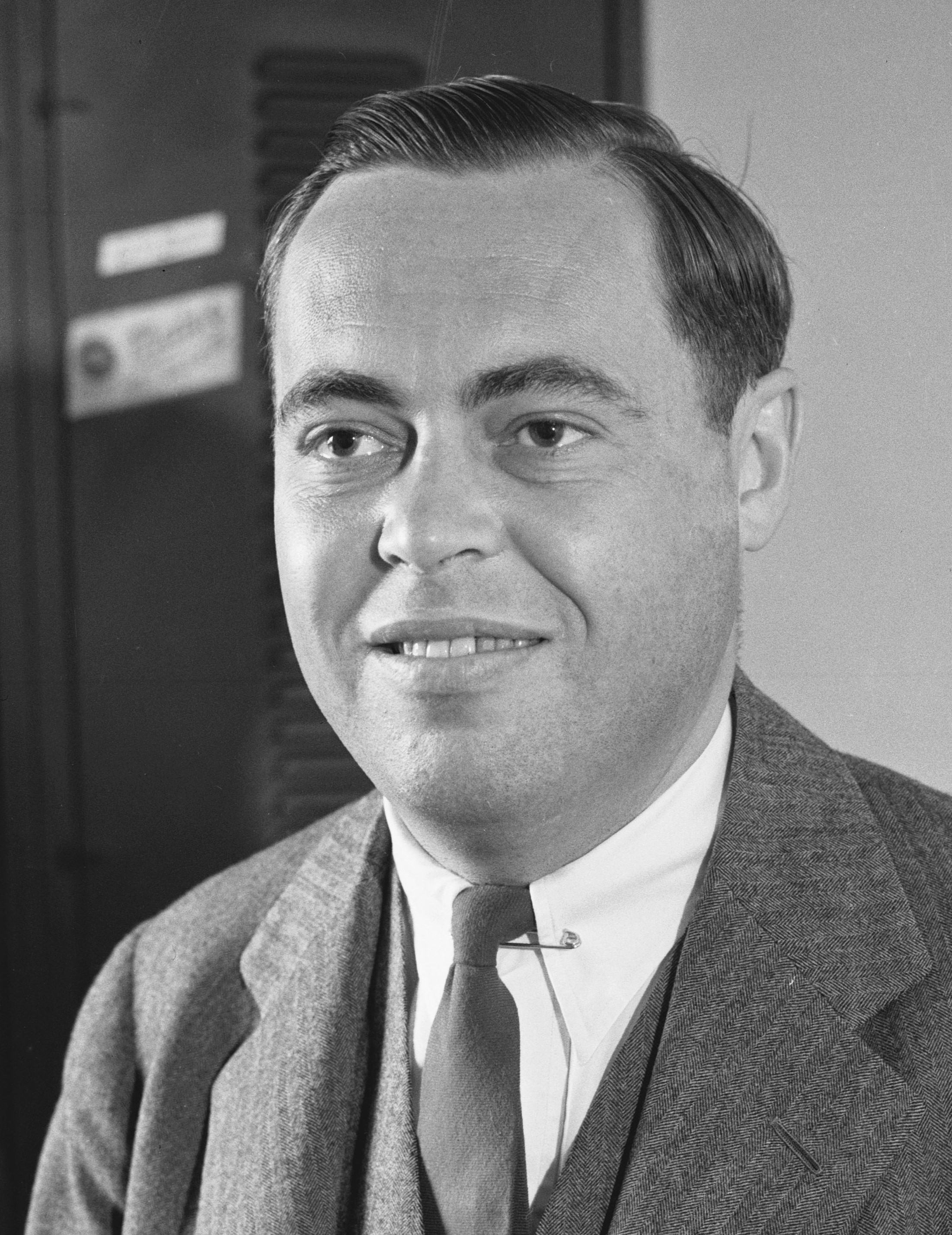
- Tubbs in 1930

Member of the California Senate from the 19th district
- In office January 5, 1925 – January 2, 1933
- Preceded by: Lester Grant Burnett
- Succeeded by: J. M. Inman

Personal details
- Born: May 8, 1897 San Francisco, California, U.S.
- Died: May 15, 1969 (aged 72) San Francisco, California, U.S.
- Party: Republican
- Spouse: Olivia Pillsbury Gibson (m. 1931, div. 1937)

Military service
- Branch/service: United States Army; United States Marine Corps
- Battles/wars: World War I World War II

Tallant Tubbs (May 8, 1897 – May 15, 1969) served in the California State Senate for the 19th district from 1925 to 1933. He served in the United States Army during World War I and in the United States Marine Corps during World War II. He was the Republican "wet" candidate for the United States Senate in California in 1932, losing to William Gibbs McAdoo, Jr. Tallant Tubbs was the grandson of Alfred L. Tubbs, a founder of the Tubbs Cordage Co. of San Francisco.

Party political offices
Preceded by Samuel M. Shortridge	Republican nominee for U.S. Senator from California (Class 3); 1932	Succeeded by Philip Bancroft
