= Men in feminism =

Historically, men have played a role in the feminist movement. Although some feminists argue that men, because of their social privilege or inability to experience sexism in the same way as women, cannot fully identify as feminists, others view their engagement as essential to dismantling patriarchy and bringing about gender equality.

== History ==
Throughout the seventeenth and eighteenth centuries, the majority of pro-feminist authors emerged from France, including François Poullain de La Barre, Denis Diderot, Paul Henri Thiry d'Holbach, and Charles Louis de Montesquieu. Montesquieu introduced female characters, like Roxana in Persian Letters, who subverted patriarchal systems, and represented his arguments against despotism. The 18th century saw male philosophers attracted to issues of human rights, and men such as the Marquis de Condorcet championed women's education. Liberals, such as the utilitarian Jeremy Bentham, demanded equal rights for women in every sense, as people increasingly came to believe that women were treated unfairly under the law.

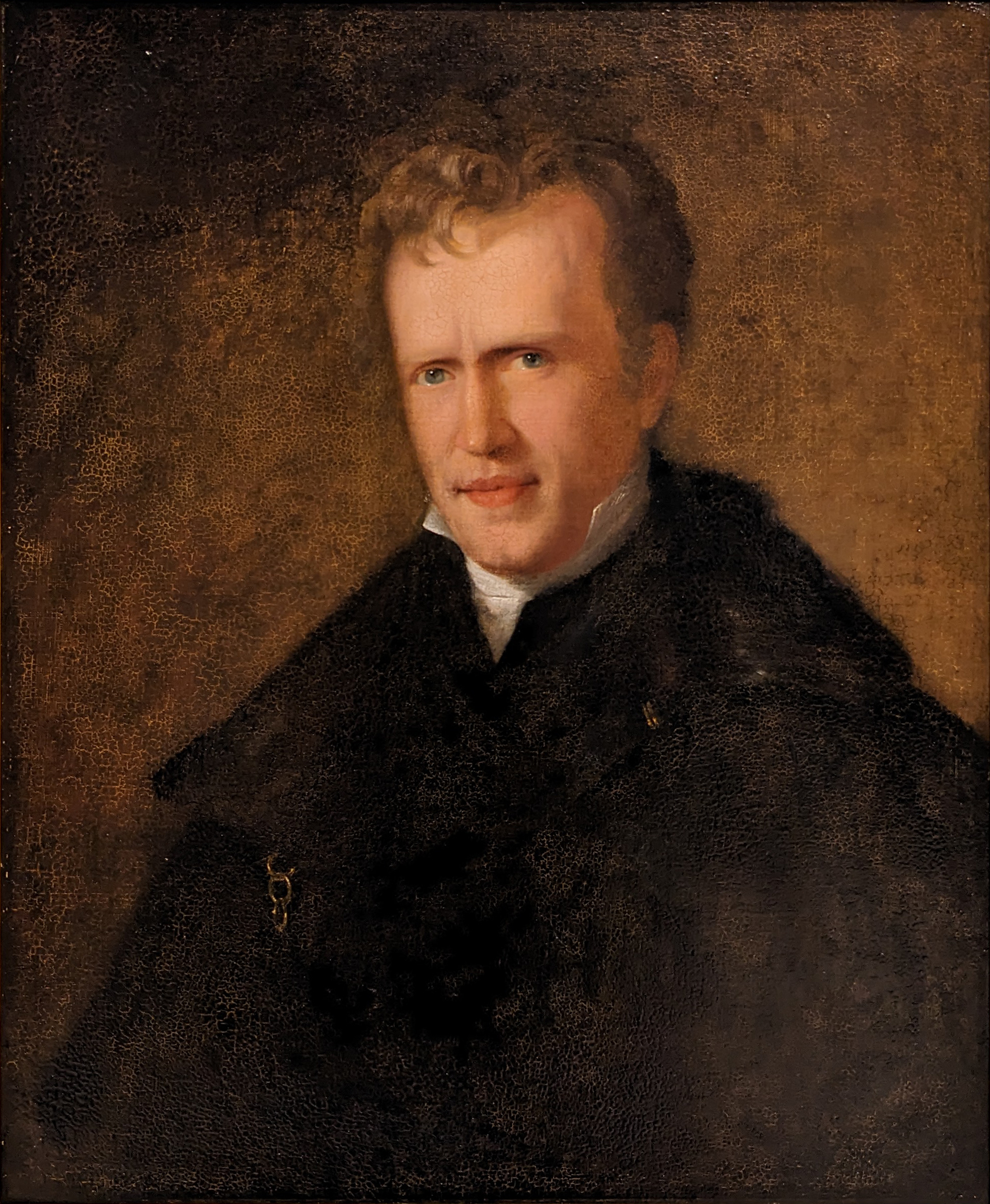
John Neal in 1823

In the 1820s, John Neal wrote feminist essays that filled an intellectual gap between female scholars in the 1790s and those surrounding the 1848 Seneca Falls Convention. As a male writer insulated from many common forms of attack against female feminist thinkers, Neal's advocacy was crucial in bringing the field back into the mainstream in England and the US. He delivered America's first women's rights lecture in 1832 and reached his peak in the field circa 1843, though he continued writing and organizing on feminist issues into the 1870s. The British legal historian, Sir Henry Maine, criticized the inevitability of patriarchy in his Ancient Law (1861).

Parker Pillsbury and other abolitionist men held feminist views and openly identified as feminist, using their influence to promote the rights of women and slaves respectively. Pillsbury helped draft the constitution of the feminist American Equal Rights Association in 1865 serving as vice-president of the New Hampshire Woman Suffrage Association. In 1868 and 1869, Parker edited The Revolution with Elizabeth Cady Stanton.

In 1840, women were refused the right to participate at the World Anti-Slavery Convention in London. Supporters of the women attending argued that it was hypocritical to forbid women and men from sitting together at this convention to end slavery; they cited similar segregationist arguments in the United States that were used to separate whites and blacks. When women were still denied to join in the proceedings, abolitionists William Lloyd Garrison, Charles Lenox Remond, Nathaniel Peabody Rogers, and Henry Stanton, all elected to sit silently with the women.

Abolitionist Thomas Wentworth Higginson argued:

I do not see how any woman can avoid a thrill of indignation when she first opens her eyes to the fact that it is really contempt, not reverence, that has so long kept her sex from an equal share of legal, political, and educational rights ... [a woman needs equal rights] not because she is man's better half, but because she is his other half. She needs them, not as an angel, but as a fraction of humanity.

American sociologist Michael Kimmel categorized American male responses to feminism at the turn of the twentieth century into three categories: pro-feminist, masculinist, and antifeminist. Pro-feminist men, believing that changes would also benefit men, generally welcomed women's increased participation in the public sphere, and changes in the division of labour in the home; in contrast, anti-feminists opposed women's suffrage and participation in public life, supporting a traditional patriarchal family model. Finally, the masculinist movement was characterized by men's groups, and developed as an indirect reaction to the perceived femininization of manhood.

== Men's liberation movement ==
The link between the biological male sex and the social construction of masculinity was seen by some scholars as a limitation on men's collaboration with the feminist movement. Thus, second-wave pro-feminist writers were able to explore the interactions between social practices and institutions, and ideas of gender.

== Men's rights movement ==
The men's rights movement was formed in the 1980s as a splinter breaking away from the men's liberation movement, as part of a backlash to feminism. This group claimed that men's rights were being reduced by feminism, that feminist advances had not been balanced by the elimination of traditional feminine privileges, and that the men should empower themselves by revitalizing their masculinity.

== Male feminism and pro-feminism ==
The feminist movement is divided on whether or not men can be considered feminists. Male-exclusionary feminists believe that men can not be true feminists because they do not have the experience of living as a woman, such as facing the discrimination and stereotyping that women do.

As feminist writer Shira Tarrant has argued, a number of men have engaged with and contributed to feminist movements throughout the history. Today, academics like Michael Flood, Michael Messner, and Michael Kimmel are involved with men's studies and pro-feminism.

Some feminists, like Simone de Beauvoir in her seminal text The Second Sex, argue that men cannot be feminists because of the intrinsic differences between the sexes. Separatist feminists also hold this view, arguing that only by rejecting the masculine perspective entirely can feminism allow women to define themselves on their own terms, and that the involvement of men in the feminist movement will inculcate the values of patriarchy into any social change. Some writers hold that men do not suffer the same oppression as women, and as such cannot comprehend women's experience, and as such cannot constructively contribute to feminist movements or concepts.

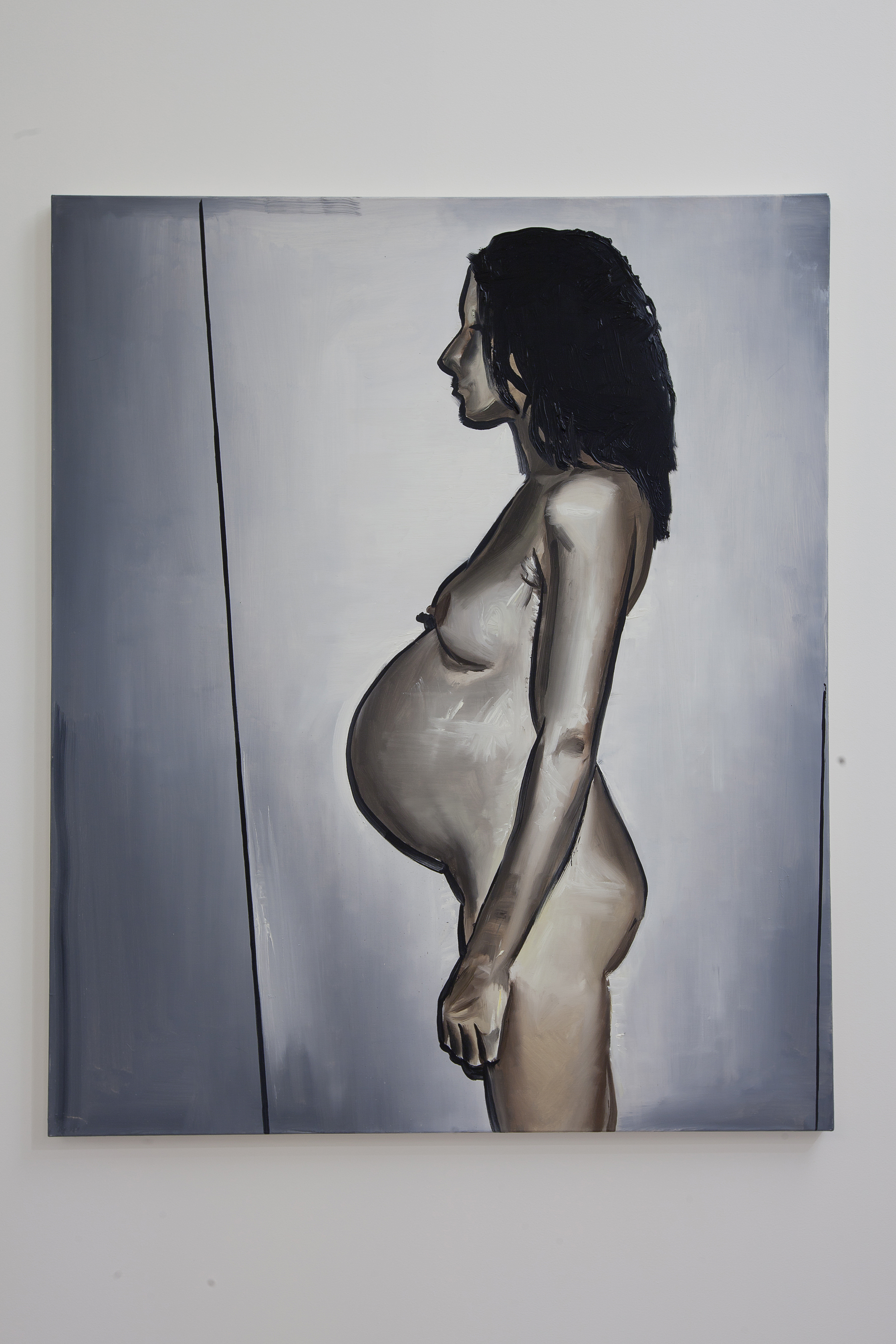
The painting Anka, 2010, by Wilhelm Sasnal, is a pro feminist depiction of the artist's self-aware, independent wife.

Others argue that men's identification with the feminist movement is necessary for furthering the feminist causes. A number of feminist writers maintain that identifying as a feminist is the strongest stand men can take in the struggle against sexism against women. They have argued that men should be allowed, or even encouraged, to participate in the feminist movement. For some, the participation of men in the feminist movement is seen as part of a process of the universalization of the feminist movement, necessary for its continued relevance. One challenge of motivating men to participate, or promoting their inclusion, in feminism has been linked to the disconnect between gender and intersecting components of identity. One example of this is that some African American men have been unable to carry over the fundamental principles and lessons of the struggle for civil rights into a meaningful contribution to the struggle to end sexist oppression. However, at a more primary level, the bonds formed in the civil rights movement established valuable solidarity among African American women and men. This is an approach that may be transferable and equally useful to the feminist movement. Making these important connections understood by women and men might greatly benefit feminism. As described in the theory of strategic intersectionality, utilizing the experiences of one part of our identity that intersects with another provides insightful tools to further improve the available tactics of the feminist movement. Other female feminists argue that men cannot be feminists simply because they are not women, cannot understand women's issues, and are collectively members of the class of oppressors against women. They assert that men are granted inherent privileges that prevent them from fundamentally identifying with feminist struggles and thus make it impossible for them to identify with feminists.

One idea supporting men's inclusion as "feminists" is that excluding men from the feminist movement labels it as solely a female task, which could be argued to be sexist in itself. This idea asserts that until men share equal responsibility for struggling to end sexism against women, the feminist movement will reflect the very sexist contradiction it wishes to eradicate. The term "profeminist" occupies the middle ground in this semantic debate, because it offers a degree of closeness to feminism without using the term itself. Also, the prefix "pro" characterizes the term as more proactive and positive. There has been some debate regarding the use of the hyphen (identifying as a "pro-feminist" as opposed to a profeminist), claiming that it distances the term too much from feminism proper.

=== Feminist men in popular culture ===
==== Justin Trudeau ====
In 2015 Canadian Prime Minister Justin Trudeau made international headlines for establishing the first gender-balanced cabinet in Canada. In response to a media question asking his reason for doing so, Trudeau said, "Because it's 2015." At the World Economic Forum in 2016, Trudeau again made headlines when he spoke about raising his sons to be feminists and urged men not to be afraid of using the word "feminist". A few months later at a United Nations conference, Trudeau said "I'm going to keep saying, loud and clearly, that I am a feminist. Until it is met with a shrug." He explained further what that meant for him:

It shouldn't be something that creates a reaction. It's simply saying that I believe in the equality of men and women and that we still have an awful lot of work to do to get there. That's like saying the sky is blue and the grass is green.

— Justin Trudeau, United Nations conference, March 16th 2016

=== Contemporary academics and activists ===
==== Michael Kimmel ====
An American sociologist in the field of Gender Studies, specializing in men and masculinities. He self describes as a longtime feminist. Kimmel is known for articulating the concept of "Masculinity as Homophobia," arguing that men's fear of being perceived as gay is the driving force behind much of their rigid, dominant, and often violent behavior. This drive is a constant quest to prove one's "manhood."

===== Notable works =====
Guyland: The Perilous World Where Boys Become Men (2008) - Focuses on the transitional period between adolescence and adulthood.

Manhood in America: A Cultural History (2011, 3rd ed.) - A historical examination of the changing ideals of American manhood.

- Article: "Masculinity as Homophobia: Fear, Shame and Silence in the Construction of Gender Identity" (1994) - A foundational paper in the field.

==== Michael Messner ====
An American sociologist specializing in gender and the sociology of sports. His work analyzes how major social institutions, particularly sport, reinforce or challenge gender inequality. Messner's research critiques the pervasive nature of patriarchy and sexism within athletic cultures. He has conducted a long-running longitudinal study of the coverage of women's and men's sports on televised news.

He introduced the concept of "soft essentialism" in youth sports, which describes how adults, while celebrating equal opportunity for girls, often explain boys' behavior as being "naturally" driven (e.g., by testosterone), thus retaining an essentialist view of gender difference.

===== Notable works =====
-Power at Play: Sports and the Problem of Masculinity (1992) - Examines the role of sport in shaping male identity.

Some Men: Feminist Allies and the Movement to End Violence Against Women (2015) - Explores the life histories and motivations of men who actively work to end gender-based violence.

"Gender Ideologies, Youth Sports, and the Production of Soft Essentialism" (2011, Sociology of Sport Journal) - Details his core theory on gender difference in youth sports.

==== Michael Flood ====
An Australian sociologist whose work focuses on men, masculinity, and the prevention of violence against women and children. His research primarily engages with public policy and social change campaigns. His major contribution is his scholarship and activism on engaging men and boys in gender equality and anti-violence work. He emphasizes that since men and boys are overwhelmingly the perpetrators of violence, they must be part of the solution. He employs a restrictive definition of masculinity known as the "Man Box" - a set of masculine norms that have negative impacts on men and fuel harmful behaviors.

===== Notable works =====
Engaging Men and Boys in Violence Prevention (2018) - Offers a framework for effective programming and policy.

"From work with men and boys to changes of social norms and reduction of inequities in gender relations" (2015, The Lancet) - Co-authored paper outlining a conceptual shift in violence prevention.

He coordinates "The Men's Bibliography", an extensive online collection of academic work on men and masculinities.

==== This is what a feminist looks like ====
In October 2014 ElleUk created a shirt with the slogan "This Is What a Feminist Looks Like" with The Fawcett Society. A photo series featuring many A-list stars wearing the shirts was released. The production of the shirts was criticized for being anti-feminist due to sweat-shop labour. In spite of this criticism, the phrase became popular. It was quoted by President Barack Obama in a speech at the United State of Women Summit in 2016. In 2017 two photographers, Carey Lynne Fruth and Sophie Spinelle, launched a photo series with subjects holding signs bearing the slogan.

==== Equal pay support in Hollywood ====
Five original stars from The Big Bang Theory including four men (Jim Parsons, Johnny Galecki, Kunal Nayyar and Simon Helberg) decided to take a pay cut so that their two female co-stars who joined later could earn a higher wage for seasons 11 and 12. The current wage gap sits at $900,000, with the original cast making one million dollars per episode, while Mayim Bialik and Melissa Rauch earn $100,000 per episode.

Emmy Rossum from Shameless put production of season 8 on hold when she was renegotiating her contract for equal pay as her co-star William H. Macy. She also requested a little more money to make up for the years of work where she was making less. When confronted by TMZ with this reality, William H. Macy responded, "It's about f--king time, don't you think?" and "She works as hard as I do, she deserves everything."

Bradley Cooper responded to his frequent co-star Jennifer Lawrence's "Why Do These Dudes Make More Than Me?" essay by vowing to share his salary information with his female co-stars during the preproduction negotiation stage in an effort to reduce the gender gap.

==== Men supporting the Women's March 2017 ====
John Legend attended the Women's March on Main Street Park City in Utah on January 21, 2017. In an interview he revealed that he joined the march to show solidarity with everyone marching all around the world, and to raise awareness on equality to ensure that all the progress that women and people of colour have made over the past century is not diminished under President Donald Trump's administration.

Many male liberal leaders and politicians took part in the march as well. Among them, Bernie Sanders took the stage at the Vermont Women's March on January 21, 2017. He spoke in support of equal work for equal pay, health care, Planned Parenthood and unifying the country. Former Secretary of State John Kerry also joined the Women's March in Washington, D.C.

=== Pro-feminist campaign ===
There is also the United Nations' women's solidarity movement for gender equality, which encourages boys and men to become equal partners with women. The HeForShe campaign aims to enlist everyone to do their part to reimagine a society through gender equality. Since the launch of HeForShe campaign in 2014, UN Women ambassadors alongside Emma Watson and thousands of men across the globe are committed to the goal of gender equality. Overall, bell hooks concludes that gender issues are not just for women as some men may believe, but it is for everyone. Therefore, the more we work together, the better our society will be. Emma Watson's moving speech at the United Nations about gender equality for the UN's HeForShe campaign demonstrates the first look at the notion "HeForShe".

== Men's studies ==
Masculinity scholars seek to broaden the academic discourse of gender through men's studies. While some feminists argue that most academic disciplines, except women's studies, can be considered "men's studies" because they claim that the content of the curriculum consists of primarily male subjects, masculinity scholars assert that men's studies specifically analyzes men's gendered experiences. Central to men's studies is the understanding that "gender" does not mean "female", the same way "race" does not mean "black". Men's studies are typically interdisciplinary, and incorporate the feminist conception that "the personal is political." Masculinity scholars strive to contribute to the existing dialogue about gender created through women's studies.

There are various arguments and movements that support the cause for gender equality as it relates to feminism. Jackson Katz suggests that we have a responsibility to help youths to create a society that will prevent future generations from experiencing the current issues regarding gender equality. Gender studies is often referred to as women's issues. Women's issues are sometimes viewed as issues that men contribute to. Katz argues that women's issues should be men's issues as well. Katz believes that when both genders work together, there is a change that the next generation can use to avoid suffering similar tragedies.

We owe it to young men. These boys didn't make the choice to be a man in a culture that tells them that manhood is a certain way. We, that have a choice, have an opportunity and a responsibility to them.

— Jackson Katz, TEDxFiDiWomen conference, November 2012

== Polls ==
In 2001, a Gallup poll found that 20% of American men considered themselves feminists, with 75% saying they were not. A 2005 CBS poll found that 24% of men in the United States claim the term "feminist" is an insult. Four in five men refused to identify themselves as feminist, but when a specific definition is given the number fell to two in five. An increasing number of men said that feminism had improved their lives, in comparison to polls taken in 1983 and 1999, with an unprecedented, but marginal plurality of 47% agreeing. 60% believed that a strong women's movement is no longer needed. However, a YouGov Poll of Britain in 2010 found that only 16% of men described themselves as feminist with 54% stating they were not and 8% specifically claiming to be antifeminist.

== Recent studies ==
In 2001, a qualitative study of men's perception of feminism showed pervasive patterns of binary reasoning. Researchers found that the participants identified two genres of feminism and two strains of feminists, and dubbed it the 'Jekyll and Hyde' binary. The participants would classify feminism and feminists as either "good" or "monstrous". In 2016 the study was repeated by a new team of researchers to find that the binary persisted, as "unreasonable feminism" and "fair feminism" were both studies were inconclusive as to whether or not men supported feminism.

== See also ==
- Antifeminism
- Feminism
- Masculinity
- Masculism
- Men's liberation
- Men's movement
- Men's rights
- Philandry
- Pro-feminism
- White Ribbon Campaign
- Women Against Feminism
- Women's rights
