= Instituto para el Desarrollo de Masculinidades Anti Hegemónicas =

Mexican male organization

Institute for the Development of Anti-Hegemonic Masculinities
- Instituto para el Desarrollo de Masculinidades Anti Hegemónicas
- Abbreviation: IDMAH
- Formation: 2010s
- Founder: Nicko Nogués
- Founded at: Mexico
- Website: demachosahombres.com

The Instituto para el Desarrollo de Masculinidades Anti Hegemónicas (English: Institute for the Development of Anti-Hegemonic Masculinities) is a Mexican organization founded in 2018 by Spanish-Mexican activist Nicko Nogués. Under the motto de machos a hombres ("from machos to men") the IMDAH aims to help Mexican men challenge machismo and normalize other forms of masculinity that go beyond the traditional, through spaces for reflection, training, and services.

Initially, the institution focused on the heterosexual male population, but its content was later expanded to include gay and bisexual men.

It is part of the men's movements that include the men's liberation movement and the pro-feminist men's movement.

== History ==
The IDMAH was founded by activist Nicko Nogués, who, in addition to being interested in issues of gender and masculinity, is also an environmental advocate. He seeks to create spaces where men can talk about their emotions, problems, and experiences, away from sexist stereotypes.

== Objects ==
The IDMAH aims to contribute to the construction of masculinities that do not reproduce logics of domination, violence, or inequality. Its objectives include:

- Fostering a culture of respect and diversity.
- Dismantling traditional mandates associated with hegemonic masculinity.
- Promoting public policies and pedagogical practices with a gender perspective.
- Providing theoretical and methodological tools for interventions in educational, community, and workplace settings.
