= Men's rights movement =

Anti-feminist branch of the men's movement

The men's rights movement (MRM) or men's rights activism (MRA) is a branch of the men's movement that diverged from the men's liberation movement in the early 1970s. Men's rights activists (MRAs) focus on social issues such as the provision of government services, which they say adversely impact, or in some cases, structurally discriminate against men and boys. Common topics of discussion include family law, such as child custody, alimony and marital property distribution; reproduction; suicide; domestic violence against men; false accusations of rape; circumcision; education; conscription; social safety nets; and health policies.

Many scholars describe the movement or parts of the movement as a backlash against feminism. Sectors of the men's rights movement have been described by scholars and commentators as misogynistic, hateful, and, in some cases, as advocating violence against women. In 2018, the Southern Poverty Law Center categorized some men's rights groups as being part of a hate ideology under the umbrella of male supremacy while stating that others "focused on legitimate grievances". UN Women has listed movements encompassing "men's rights" among anti-rights movements that frame equality for women and LGBTQ+ people as a threat.

== History ==
=== Forerunners ===
The term "men's rights" was used at least as early as February 1856 when it appeared in Putnam's Magazine. The author was responding to the issue of women's rights, calling it a "new movement for social reform, and even for political revolution", which the author proposed to counter with men's rights. Ernest Belfort Bax wrote The Legal Subjection of Men in 1896, deriding the women's rights movement as a farcical effort by women—the "privileged sex"—to prove they were "oppressed."

Three loosely connected men's rights organizations formed in Austria in the interwar period. The League for Men's Rights was founded in 1926 with the goal of "combating all excesses of women's emancipation". In 1927, the Justitia League for Family Law Reform and the Aequitas World's League for the Rights of Men split from the League of Men's Rights. The three men's rights groups opposed women's entry into the labor market and what they saw as the corrosive influence of the women's movement on social and legal institutions. They criticized marriage and family laws, especially the requirement to pay spousal and child support to former wives and illegitimate children, and supported the use of blood tests to determine paternity. Justitia and Aequitas issued their own short-lived journals Men's Rightists Newspaper and Self-Defense where they expressed their views that were heavily influenced by the works of Heinrich Schurtz, Otto Weininger, and Jörg Lanz von Liebenfels. The organizations ceased to exist before 1939.

=== Split from men's liberation movement ===
The modern men's rights movement emerged from the men's liberation movement, which appeared in the first half of the 1970s when scholars began to study feminist ideas and politics. These scholars acknowledged men's institutionalized power while critically examining the consequences of hegemonic masculinity, believing that both men and women suffered in a patriarchal society. The men's liberation movement was led by psychologists who argued that femininity and masculinity were socially formed behaviors and not the result of genes. They tried to balance the two ideas that men were responsible for oppressing women, but also being oppressed themselves by strict gender roles.

In the mid-1970s, this movement began to focus on the oppression of men and less on the effects of sexism on women. In the late 1970s, the movement split into two separate strands with opposing views: the pro-feminist men's movement and the anti-feminist men's rights movement, which sees men as an oppressed group.

In the 1980s, the men's rights movement focused only on the ways that sex roles discriminated against males rather than the oppression it inflicted on both genders. Author Herb Goldberg claimed that the U.S. was a "matriarchal society" because women have the power to transgress gender roles and assume masculine and feminine roles, while males are still constrained to the purely masculine role. Reneé Blank and Sandra Slipp in 1994 compiled the testimonies of men who believed they were discriminated against based on their sex and race. This occurred at a time when women were entering the workforce and obtaining managerial positions.

In the 1980s and 1990s, men's rights activists opposed societal changes sought by feminists and defended the patriarchal gender order in the family, schools and the workplace. Sociologist Michael Kimmel states that their earlier critiques of gender roles "morphed into a celebration of all things masculine and a near infatuation with the traditional masculine role itself".

=== Organizations ===
One of the first major men's rights organizations was the Coalition of American Divorce Reform Elements, founded by Richard Doyle in 1971, from which the Men's Rights Association spun off in 1973. Free Men Inc. was founded in 1977 in Columbia, Maryland, spawning several chapters over the following years, which eventually merged to form the National Coalition of Free Men (known since 2008 as the National Coalition for Men). Men's Rights, Inc. was also formed in 1977, the National Organization for Men was founded in 1983, and Fathers and Families was formed in 1994. In the United Kingdom, a men's rights group calling itself the UK Men's Movement began to organize in the early 1990s. The Save Indian Family Foundation (SIFF) was founded in 2005, and in 2010 claimed to have over 30,000 members.

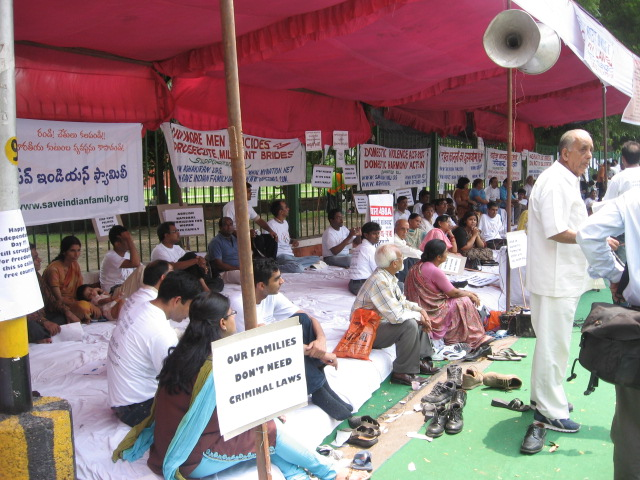
Protest in New Delhi for men's rights organized by the Save Indian Family Foundation

Men's rights groups have formed in some European countries during periods of shifts toward conservatism and policies supporting patriarchal family and gender relations. In the United States, the men's rights movement has ideological ties to neoconservatism. Men's rights activists have received lobbying support from conservative organizations and their arguments have been covered extensively in neoconservative media.

Fringe political parties focusing on men's rights have been formed including, but not limited to, the Australian Non-Custodial Parents Party (Equal Parenting), the Israeli Man's Rights in the Family Party, and the Justice for Men and Boys party in the UK.

=== Online presence ===
The men's rights movement has become more vocal and more organized since the development of the Internet, where activists tend to congregate. Men's rights websites and forums have proliferated within the online manosphere. While some of the groups have adversarial relationships with one another, they tend to be united in their misogyny, promotion of masculinity, and opposition to feminism.

Men's rights proponents often use the red pill and blue pill metaphor from the film The Matrix to identify each other online; those who accept the idea that men are the oppressed victims of a misandrist society are said to have "taken the red pill". Paul Elam's site A Voice for Men (AVFM) functions as a central point of discussion and organization for men's rights issues. Other sites dedicated to men's rights are Fathers [sic] Rights Foundation, MGTOW.com (Men Going Their Own Way), and several Reddit forums such as /r/MensRights and /r/TheRedPill.

== Ideology ==
Many scholars consider the men's rights movement a backlash or countermovement to feminism. The men's rights movement generally incorporates points of view that reject feminist and profeminist ideas. Men's rights activists (MRAs) say feminism has surpassed its original goals and is now harming men. MRAs believe that men are victims of feminism and "feminizing" influences in society, and that entities such as public institutions now discriminate against men.

Men's rights activists argue that society has historically benefited women and femininity at the expense of men, an idea termed gynocentrism. MRAs believe that patriarchy is a feminist myth and that feminism creates unfair advantages for women, causing men to become a disadvantaged group. They argue that men are not only oppressed, but also degraded and vilified; this idea of misandry or hatred of men is commonly used by MRAs to dispute feminist accusations of misogyny. Feminism is portrayed as having degenerated from its original purpose as a movement for basic equality into an outlet for vindictive, irrational women to gain power and express their hatred of men.

MRAs dispute that men as a group have institutional power and privilege and believe that men are victimized relative to women, including in regard to what had been considered feminist concerns, such as domestic violence, pornography, prostitution, and sexism in mass media. The movement is divided between those who consider sexism equally harmful to both men and women and those who view men as disadvantaged relative to women, who benefit from "female privilege".

Men's rights groups generally reject the notion that feminism is interested in men's problems, and some men's rights activists have viewed the women's movement as a plot to deliberately conceal discrimination against men and promote gynocentrism. Warren Farrell and Herb Goldberg have argued that women hold the true power in society through their roles as the primary caregivers of children, and that male power is an illusion.

Sociologist Michael Messner states that the early men's rights movement "appropriates the symmetrical language of sex roles" first used by feminists, which implies a false balance of institutional power between men and women. Masculinities scholar Jonathan A. Allan describes the men's rights movement as a reactionary movement that is defined by its opposition to women and feminism but has not yet formulated its own theories and methodologies outside of antifeminism.

== Topics ==
Men's rights activists claim that men experience gender discrimination in various areas of society, including child custody cases, domestic violence, health, and education. Some, if not all, men's rights issues stem from gender roles and, according to sociologist Allan G. Johnson, patriarchy.

=== Anti-dowry laws ===
Men's rights organizations such as Save Indian Family Foundation (SIFF) say that women misuse legislation meant to protect them from dowry death and bride burnings. SIFF is a men's rights organization in India that focuses on abuse of anti-dowry laws against men. SIFF has campaigned to abolish Section 498A of the Indian Penal Code, which penalizes cruelty by husbands (and the husband's family) in pursuit of dowry or for driving a wife to suicide. SIFF states anti-dowry laws are regularly being abused to settle petty disputes in marriage and that they regularly receive calls from many men who allege their wives have used false dowry claims to imprison them.

=== Fathers' rights ===
A prominent area of concern of the men's rights movement in Western countries has been the issue of fathers' rights. Fathers' rights campaigners advocate for greater influence of fathers in the lives of children, especially after divorce. Sociologists Melissa Blais and Francis Dupuis-Déri have identified fathers' rights as the main area for recruitment into the men's rights movement as a whole.

Men's rights advocates argue that family law and family courts are biased against fathers, especially in regards to child custody. They believe that men do not have the same contact rights or equitable shared parenting rights as their ex-spouse and use statistics on custody awards as evidence of judicial bias against men. Conversely, sociologist Michael Flood argues that fathers' lack of involvement with their children before separation plays a larger role in obstructing their access to children after divorce.

Fathers' rights activists promote the interests of separated fathers through lobbying for changes in family law, such as making joint custody the default custody arrangement. They have appropriated the feminist rhetoric of "rights" and "equality" in their discourse, framing child custody as a matter of basic civil rights. Men's rights activists argue that the lack of contact with their children makes fathers less willing to pay child support. Others cite the discredited parental alienation syndrome (PAS) or parental alienation as a reason to grant custody to fathers; they claim that mothers alienate children from their fathers and make false accusations of abuse in order to seek revenge against fathers.

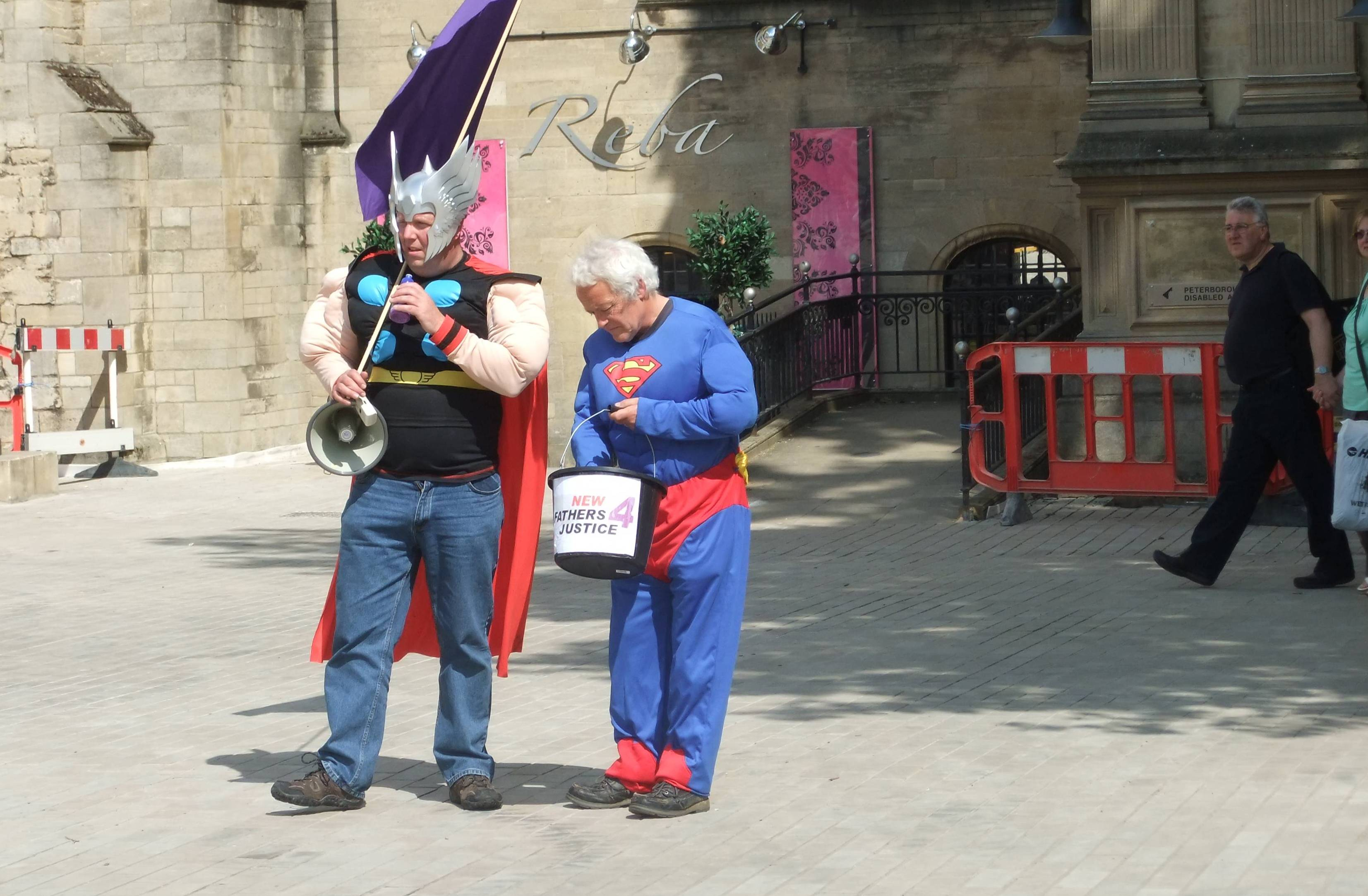
Two protesters from UK-based fathers' rights group Fathers 4 Justice protesting in Peterborough in 2010

Scholars and critics argue that empirical research does not support the notion of a judicial bias against men and that men's rights advocates distort statistics in a way that ignores the fact that the majority of men do not seek custody, and the overwhelming majority of custody cases are settled outside of court.

Academics critique the rhetorical framing of custody decisions, stating that men's rights advocates appeal for "equal rights" without ever specifying the legal rights they believe have been violated. Scholars and critics argue that the men's rights rhetoric of children's "needs" that accompanies their plea for fathers' rights is merely to deflect criticism that they are motivated by self-interest and masks men's rights advocates' own claims. Critics argue that abusive men use allegations of parental alienation to counter mothers' legitimate concerns about their and their children's safety. Deborah Rhode argues that, contrary to the claims of some men's rights activists, research shows that joint legal custody does not increase the likelihood that fathers will pay child support or remain involved parents. Flood argues that the fathers' and men's rights movement seems to prioritize re-establishing paternal authority over the children, rather than actual involvement, and that they prioritize principles of equality over the positive parenting and well-being of the children.

Men's rights activists also seek to expand the rights of unwed fathers in case of their child's adoption. Warren Farrell argues that in failing to inform the father of a pregnancy, an expectant mother deprives an adopted child of a relationship with the biological father. He proposes that women be legally required to make every reasonable effort to notify the father of her pregnancy within four to five days. In response, philosopher James P. Sterba agrees that, for moral reasons, a woman should inform the father of the pregnancy and adoption, but this should not be imposed as a legal requirement as it might result in undue pressure, for example, to have an abortion.

=== Circumcision ===
Observers have stated that the 'intactivist' movement, an anti-circumcision movement, has some overlap with the men's rights movement. Most men's rights activists object to routine neonatal circumcision and compare the procedure to female genital mutilation.

The controversy around non-consensual circumcision of children for non-therapeutic reasons is not exclusive to the men's rights movement, and involves concerns of feminists and medical ethics. Some doctors and academics have argued that circumcision is a violation of the right to health and bodily integrity, while others have disagreed.

=== Divorce ===
Men's rights groups in the United States began organizing in opposition to divorce reform and custody issues around the 1960s. Up until this time, husbands held legal power and control over wives and children. The men involved in the early organization claimed that family and divorce law discriminated against them and favored their wives. Men's rights leader Rich Doyle likened divorce courts to slaughterhouses, considering their judgements unsympathetic and unreasonable.

Men's rights activists have argued that divorce and custody laws violate men's individual rights to equal protection. Law professor Gwendolyn Leachman writes that this sort of framing "downplays the systemic biases that women face that justify protective divorce and custody laws".

=== Domestic violence ===
Men's rights groups describe domestic violence committed by women against men as a problem that goes ignored, under-reported, and under-researched, in part because men are reluctant to label themselves as victims. They say that women are as aggressive or more aggressive than men in relationships and that domestic violence is gender-symmetrical. They cite controversial family conflict research by Murray Straus and Richard Gelles as evidence of gender symmetry. Men's rights advocates argue that judicial systems too easily accept false allegations of domestic violence by women against male partners. Men's rights advocates have been critics of legal, policy and practical protections for abused women, campaigning for domestic violence shelters for battered men and for the legal system to be educated about women's violence against men. In the early 21st or late 20th century, the National Coalition for Free Men sued the Minnesota state, calling for funding to women's domestic violence programmes to be removed under the idea that they "discriminate against men".

In response to such claims, family violence scholar Richard Gelles published an article entitled "Domestic Violence: Not An Even Playing Field" and accused the men's rights movement of distorting his research findings on men's and women's violence to promote a misogynistic agenda. Many domestic violence scholars and advocates have rejected the research cited by men's rights activists as flawed, disputing their claims that such violence is gender symmetrical, saying that their focus on women's violence stems from a political agenda to minimize the severity of the problem of men's violence against women and children and to undermine services to abused women.

=== Education ===
Men's rights advocates blame the influence of feminism on education for what they believe is discrimination against and systematic oppression of boys in the education system. They critique what they describe as the "feminization" of education, stating that the predominance of female teachers, a focus on girls' needs, as well as a curricula and assessment methods that supposedly favour girls, have proved repressive and restrictive to men and boys.

Men's rights groups call for increased recognition of masculinity, greater numbers of male role models, more competitive sports, and the increased responsibilities for boys in the school setting. They have also advocated clearer school routines, more traditional school structures, including gender-segregated classrooms, and stricter discipline.

One primary characteristic of men's rights groups is the view of boys as a homogeneous group that shares common educational experiences; this means that it fails to account for how responses to educational approaches may differ by age, disability, culture, ethnicity, sexuality, religion, and class.

In Australia, men's rights discourse has influenced government policy documents. Compared to Australia, less impact has been noted in the United Kingdom, where feminists have historically had less influence on educational policy. However, Mary Curnock Cook, the British Universities and Colleges Admissions Service (UCAS) chief executive, argued that in Britain "despite the clear evidence and despite the press coverage, there is a deafening policy silence on the issue. Has the women's movement now become so normalised that we cannot conceive of needing to take positive action to secure equal education outcomes for boys?"

=== Governmental structures ===
Men's rights groups have called for governmental structures to address issues specific to men and boys including education, health, work and marriage. Men's rights groups in India have called for the creation of a Men's Welfare Ministry and a National Commission for Men, or for the abolition of the National Commission for Women. In the United Kingdom, the creation of a Minister for Men analogous to the existing Minister for Women, has been proposed by David Amess, MP and Lord Northbourne, but was rejected by the government headed by Prime Minister Tony Blair.

=== Health ===
Men's rights groups view the health issues faced by men, and their shorter life spans compared to women globally, as evidence of discrimination and oppression. They claim that feminism has led to women's health issues being privileged at the expense of men's. They highlight certain disparities in funding of men's health issues as compared to women's, stating that, for example, prostate-cancer research receives less funding than breast-cancer research.

However, women and minorities had typically been excluded from medical research until the 1990s. Viviana Simon states: "Most biomedical and clinical research has been based on the assumption that the male can serve as representative of the species." Medical scholars warn that such false assumptions are still prevalent. Contrary to antifeminist assertions, empirical findings suggest that gender bias against females remains the norm in medicine.

Warren Farrell argues that industrialization raised the stress level of men while lowering the stress-level of women by pulling men away from the home and the family, and pushing women closer to home and family. He cites this an explanation why men are more likely to die from all 15 leading causes of death than women at all ages. He argues that the U.S. government having an Office of Research on Women's Health but no Office of Research on Men's Health, along with the U.S. federal government spending twice as much money on Women's health, shows that society considers men more disposable than women.

Scholars have critiqued these claims, stating, as Michael Messner puts it, that the poorer health outcomes are the heavy costs paid by men "for conformity with the narrow definitions of masculinity that promise to bring them status and privilege" and that these costs fall disproportionately on men who are marginalized socially and economically. According to Michael Flood, men's health would best be improved by "tackling destructive notions of manhood, an economic system which values profit and productivity over workers' health, and the ignorance of service providers", instead of blaming a feminist health movement. Genevieve Creighton & John L Oliffe have stated that men engage in positive health practices, such as reducing fat intake and alcohol, to conform to positive masculine ideals. Some have argued that biology contributes to the life-expectancy gap. For example, it has been found that females consistently outlive males among primates. Eunuchs, castrated before puberty, have shown to live with varying differences, more than other males, pointing to testosterone levels playing a role in the life-expectancy gap. Luy and Gast found that the female–male life expectancy gap is primarily due to higher mortality rates among specific sub-populations of men. They therefore state that social programs should be narrowly targeted to those sub-populations, rather than to men as a whole.

=== Homelessness ===
The Southern Poverty Law Center says that some men's rights activists focus on homelessness to draw in followers.

=== Incarceration ===
Men's rights campaigners believe that men receive harsher treatment than women in criminal justice systems around the world. They cite the disproportionate number of men in prison as evidence of this. In the United States, the United Kingdom, Australia, India and across the European Union, 90–95% of prison inmates are male. Studies have shown that, compared with women who commit similar crimes, men are more likely to be incarcerated, receive longer prison sentences, and have to serve a greater portion of their sentences. According to Warren Farrell, a man convicted of murder in the United States is twenty times more likely to receive a death sentence than a woman convicted of murder. There is also evidence that female sex offenders are treated with more leniency than their male counterparts. Farrell believes society considers women to be naturally more innocent and credible, and criticizes battered woman and infanticide defenses. He criticizes conditions in men's prisons and the lack of attention to prison male-to-male rape by authorities.

=== Military conscription ===
Men's rights activists argue that the sole military conscription of men is an example of discrimination against men. Historically, most societies have only required men to be conscripted. According to David Benatar, "perhaps the most obvious example of male disadvantage is the long history of social and legal pressures on men, but not on women, to enter the military and to fight in war, thereby risking their lives and bodily and psychological health. Where the pressure to join the military has taken the form of conscription, the costs of avoidance have been self-imposed exile, imprisonment, physical assault or, in the most extreme circumstances, execution." Around 80 countries worldwide still use conscription in various forms, and most of these have a male-only draft. As of 2018, only two countries – Norway and Sweden – required women to be conscripted under the same formal conditions as men.

In the United States, all males ages 18–25 are required to register for Selective Service. Failure to do so can result in fines, imprisonment, and ineligibility for student loans and federal employment. Women are not required to register. In 1971, draft resisters in the United States initiated a class-action suit alleging that male-only conscription violated men's rights to equal protection under the US constitution. When the case, Rostker v. Goldberg, reached the Supreme Court in 1981, they were supported by a men's rights group and multiple feminist groups, including the National Organization for Women. However, the Supreme Court upheld the Military Selective Service Act, stating that "the argument for registering women was based on considerations of equity, but Congress was entitled, in the exercise of its constitutional powers, to focus on the question of military need, rather than 'equity'". The 2016 decision by Defense Secretary Ash Carter to make all combat positions open to women relaunched debate over whether or not women should be required to register for the Selective Service System. In the case National Coalition for Men v. Selective Service System, the Southern District Court of Texas ruled the male-only draft unconstitutional.

=== Paternity fraud ===
Men's and fathers' rights groups interest in "paternity fraud" or mistaken paternity falls into two main categories: men who are compelled to provide financial support for a child that has been proven by DNA testing not to be their biological offspring, and men who have been led to believe that the children they are raising are their own, and have subsequently discovered otherwise. They hold biological views of fatherhood, emphasizing the imperative of the genetic foundation of paternity rather than social aspects of fatherhood. They state that men should not be forced to support children fathered by another man, and that men are harmed because a relationship is created between a man and non-biological children while denying the children and their biological father of that experience and knowledge of their genetic history. In addition, they say non-biological fathers are denied the resources to have their own biological children in another relationship.

Men's rights activists support the use of one-parent consent paternity testing to reassure presumed fathers about the child's paternity; men's and fathers' rights groups have also called for compulsory paternity testing of all children. They have campaigned vigorously in support of men who have been shown by genetic testing not to be the biological father, but who are nevertheless required to be financially responsible for them. Prompted by these concerns, legislators in certain jurisdictions have supported this biological view and have passed laws providing relief from child support payments when a man is proved not to be the father. Australian men's rights groups have opposed the recommendations of a report by the Australian Law Reform Commission and the National Health and Medical Research Council that would require the informed consent of both parents for paternity testing of young children, and laws that would make it illegal to obtain a sample for DNA testing without the individual's informed consent.

Estimates of the extent of misattributed paternity vary considerably. Some campaigners claim that between 10% and 30% of children are being parented by men who are unaware that they are not the biological father, but Professor Leslie Cannold writes that these numbers have been inflated by an order of magnitude, with about 1% seen in Australia and the UK, and 3% observed in the US. Sociologist Michael Gilding argues that men's rights activists have exaggerated the rate and extent of misattributed paternity, which he estimates at about 1–3%. Gilding opposed as unnecessary calls for mandatory paternity testing of all children. Even the lowest estimates of the prevalence of paternity fraud suggest it affects tens of thousands of men in the US alone.

=== Rape ===
==== False accusations against men ====
Men's rights activists believe there are a significant number of false accusations of rape, and have proposed legal changes to protect men in those situations.

Men's rights proponents believe that the naming of the accused while providing the accuser (victim) with anonymity encourages abuse of this kind. Men's rights advocates have also claimed that rape "has been used as a scam." Studies from the United States, Australia, and the Britain have found the percentage of estimated false or unsubstantiated rape allegations to be around 2% to 8%.

Whilst false accusations of rape often receive much online and media attention, the vast majority do not lead to conviction or wrongful jail time despite the claims of some organisations. A study from the British Home Office for example, shows that in the early 2000s, of 216 sexual assault cases that were classified as false allegations, only six led to an arrest and just two led to charges against the accused before ultimately being ruled as false.

To argue the issue of false accusations of rape, the categories of 'false' and 'unsubstantiated' are often conflated, such as the National Coalition for Men citing reports such as the 1996 FBI summary that finds a rate of 8% for unsubstantiated forcible rape, which is four times higher than the average for all index crimes as a whole. Experts emphasize that verified false allegations are a distinct category from unsubstantiated allegations, and conflating the two is fallacious. These figures are widely debated due to the questionable methodology and small sample sizes.

==== Sexual violence against men ====
Men's rights activists have also raised contention on the issue of sexual violence against men, especially in the context of the stigma surrounding male victims of rape and the legal troubles they face, including being counter-sued for rape, child support (see Hermesmann v. Seyer), and lack of action. Men's rights activists have also criticized the lack of attention towards prison male-to-male rape by authorities.

==== Criminalization of marital rape ====
Legislation and judicial decisions criminalizing marital rape are opposed by some men's rights groups in the United Kingdom, the United States and India. The reasons for opposition include concerns about false allegations related to divorce proceedings, and the belief that sex within marriage is an irrevocable part of the institution of marriage. In India, there has been anxiety about relationships and the future of marriage that such laws have given women "grossly disproportional rights". Virag Dhulia of the Save Indian Family Foundation, a men's rights organization, has opposed recent efforts to criminalize marital rape in India, arguing that "no relationship will work if these rules are enforced".

==== Critique of men's rights rape discourse ====
Feminist scholars Lise Gotell and Emily Dutton argue that content on the manosphere reveals anti-feminist arguments, including that sexual violence is a gender-neutral problem, feminists are responsible for erasing men's experiences of victimization, false allegations are widespread, and that rape culture is a feminist-produced moral panic. They contend it is important to engage [this topic] as there is a real danger that MRA (men's rights activism) claims could come to define the popular conversation about sexual violence.

=== Reproductive rights ===
Men's rights campaigners argue that while a woman has several legal avenues to opt out of being a mother after conception (abortion, adoption, safe haven laws), a man has no choice in whether he becomes a father and is at the mercy of the mother's decision. Moreover, a man who fathers a child as a result of reproductive coercion or a sexual assault by a woman can still be compelled to support the child financially. Cases in Kansas, California and Arizona have established that a male raped as a minor by a woman can be held legally responsible for a child that results from the assault, a situation the director of the National Center for Men described as "ridiculous", and which would not be tolerated if the genders were reversed. According to Warren Farrell, "Roe v. Wade gave women the vote over their bodies. Men still don't have the vote over theirs—whether in love or war."

In consequence, some advocate for "paper abortion", which would allow the biological father, before the birth of the child, to opt out of any rights, privileges, and responsibilities toward the child, including financial support.

In 2006, the American National Center for Men backed Dubay v. Wells, a lawsuit which concerned whether men should have the opportunity to decline all paternity rights and responsibilities in the event of an unplanned pregnancy. Supporters argued that this would allow the woman time to make an informed decision and give men the same reproductive rights as women. The case and the appeal were dismissed, with the U.S. Court of Appeals (Sixth Circuit) stating that neither parent has the right to sever their financial responsibilities for a child and that "Dubay's claim that a man's right to disclaim fatherhood would be analogous to a woman's right to abortion rests upon a false analogy".

=== Social security and insurance ===
Men's rights groups argue that women are given superior social security and tax benefits than men. Warren Farrell states that men in the United States pay more into social security, but in total, women receive more in benefits, and that discrimination against men in insurance and pensions have gone unrecognized.

=== Suicide ===
Men's rights activists point to higher suicide rates in men compared to women. In the United States for example, the male-to-female suicide death ratio varies, approximately, between 3:1 and 10:1, and some studies have shown a higher suicidal intent in men.

In Australia, 75% of suicides are male, with, on average, six men killing themselves each day.

Studies have also found an over-representation of women in attempted or incomplete suicides and men in complete suicides. This phenomenon, described as the "gender paradox in suicide," is argued to derive from a tendency for females to use less lethal methods and greater male access and use of lethal methods.

== Prominent men's rights activists ==
Most men's rights activists in the United States are white, middle-class, heterosexual men. Prominent advocates include Warren Farrell, Herb Goldberg, Richard Doyle, and Asa Baber. There are also women in the movement, including Helen Smith, Christina Hoff Sommers, Erin Pizzey, and Bettina Arndt.

=== Karen DeCrow ===
Karen DeCrow was an American attorney, author, and activist and feminist, who served as president of the National Organization for Women from 1974 to 1977, she was also a strong supporter of equal rights for men in child custody decisions, arguing for a "rebuttable presumption" of shared custody after divorce. She also argued that men as well as women should be allowed the decision not to become a parent, and was an avid supporter of father's rights movements, and argued that domestic violence is a "two-way street." As a result, DeCrow found she was "increasingly at odds with the organization she had once led, though she never broke with it."

=== Marc Angelucci ===
Marc Angelucci was an American attorney, men's rights activist, and the vice-president of the National Coalition for Men (NCFM). As a lawyer, he represented several cases related to men's rights issues, most prominently National Coalition for Men v. Selective Service System, in which the federal judge declared the male-only selective-service system unconstitutional, and Woods v. Horton, which ruled that the California State Legislature had unconstitutionally excluded men from domestic violence victim protection programs.

=== Warren Farrell ===
Warren Farrell is an American educator, activist and author of seven books on men's and women's issues. He initially came to prominence in the 1970s as a supporter of second wave feminism; he served on the New York City Board of the National Organization for Women (NOW). Generally considered the 'Father of Men's Rights Movement,'" Farrell advocates for "a gender liberation movement, with "both sexes walking a mile in each other's moccasins."

=== Herb Goldberg ===
Herb Goldberg was the author of the book What Men Still Don't Know About Women, Relationships, and Love, The Hazards of Being Male: Surviving the Myth of Masculine Privilege (1975), and What Men Really Want and Men's Secrets related to the formative men's movement. He was a professor emeritus of psychology at California State University, Los Angeles and a practicing psychologist in Los Angeles.

=== Erin Pizzey ===
Erin Pizzey is an English men's rights advocate, domestic abuse advocate and ex-feminist. She holds a controversial theory that most domestic violence between men and women is mutual and reciprocated. Pizzey has published two books: Scream Quietly or the Neighbours Will Hear and Prone to Violence. In 2024, she was named Commander of the Order of the British Empire.

=== Bettina Arndt ===
Bettina Arndt is an Australian men's right activist who was awarded the Order of Australia for gender equity in 2020. Despite heavy criticism, the Council of the Award of Australia decided not to strip her of the award.

== Reception ==
Many authors have characterized the men's rights movement as misogynistic. The Southern Poverty Law Center has stated that while some of the websites, blogs and forums related to the movement "voice legitimate and sometimes disturbing complaints about the treatment of men, what is most remarkable is the misogynistic tone that pervades so many." After further research into the movement, the SPLC elaborated: "A thinly veiled desire for the domination of women and a conviction that the current system oppresses men in favor of women are the unifying tenets of the male supremacist worldview." Other studies have pointed towards men's rights groups in India trying to change or completely abolish important legal protections for women as a form of "patriarchal anxiety" as well as being hostile towards women. In 2024 UN Women described men's rights, anti-gender and gender-critical movements as examples of anti-rights movements and linked them to "hateful propaganda and disinformation to target and attempt to delegitimize people with diverse sexual orientations, gender identities, gender expressions, and sex characteristics."

The venue for the first Men's Rights Conference in the US received death threats, calls, and demonstrations forcing the organizers to raise funds for extra security and eventually change the venue.

Professor Ruth M. Mann of the University of Windsor in Canada suggests that men's rights groups fuel an international rhetoric of hatred and victimization by disseminating misinformation via online forums and websites containing constantly-updated "diatribes against feminism, ex-wives, child support, shelters, and the family law and criminal justice systems." According to Mann, these stories reignite their hatred and reinforce their beliefs that the system is biased against men and that feminism is responsible for a large scale and ongoing "cover-up" of men's victimization. Mann says that although existing legislation in Canada acknowledges that men are also victims of domestic violence, men's rights advocates demand government recognition that men are equally or more victimized by domestic violence, claims not supported by the data. Mann also states that in contrast to feminist groups, who have advocated for domestic violence services on behalf of other historically oppressed groups in addition to women, such as individuals impacted by poverty, ethnicity, disability, sexual orientation, etc., men's rights groups have attempted to achieve their goals by actively opposing and attempting to dismantle services and supports put in place to protect abused women and children.

Other researchers such as Michael Flood have accused the men's rights movement, particularly father's rights groups in Australia, of endangering women, children, and even other men. Flood states that these groups pursue "equality with a vengeance" to re-establish the father's authority, rather than concerning themselves with the actual wellbeing of the children.

== See also ==
- Anti-feminism
- Fathers' rights movement by country
- Honey badger (men's rights)
- Manosphere
- Masculism
- Men's rights movement in India
- Men's studies
- Men Going Their Own Way
- Paternal rights and abortion
- The Red Pill, a 2016 documentary about the movement
- Toxic masculinity
- Violence against men
- The War Against Boys
