= National Organization for Men Against Sexism =

- Abbreviation: NOMAS
- Formation: 1970s
- Founded at: United States
- Headquarters: United States
- Website: nomas.org

The National Organization for Men Against Sexism (NOMAS) is an American organization that began in the 1970s as an adjunct to the second-wave feminism movement of the time. In 1982, the organization, then called the M&M (Men and Masculinity) Conference, elected its first national council "to provide a collective leadership to the anti-sexist men's movement." In 1990, the organization adopted its present name.

According to its website, "NOMAS advocates a perspective that is pro-feminist, gay affirmative, anti-racist, dedicated to enhancing men's lives, and committed to justice on a broad range of social issues including class, age, religion, and physical abilities." The organization is a part of the men's movement that includes the men's liberation movement, pro-feminist men's movement, mythopoetic men's movement, and the Christian men's movement, most notably represented by the Promise Keepers.

== Principles ==
NOMAS believes "men can live as happier and more fulfilled human beings by challenging the old-fashioned rules of masculinity that embody the assumption of male superiority." "We applaud and support the insights and positive social changes that feminism has stimulated for both women and men. We oppose such injustices to women as femicide, economic and legal discrimination, rape, domestic violence, sexual harassment, and many others."

One of the strongest and deepest anxieties of most American men is their fear of homosexuality. This homophobia contributes directly to the many injustices experienced by gay, lesbian and bisexual persons, and is a debilitating restriction for heterosexual men.

The enduring injustice of racism, which like sexism has long divided humankind into unequal and isolated groups, is of particular concern to us. Racism touches all of us and remains a primary source of inequality and oppression in our society. NOMAS is committed to examine and challenge racism in our organizations, our communities, and ourselves. We also acknowledge that many people are oppressed today because of their class, age, religion and physical condition. We believe that such injustices are vitally connected to sexism, with its fundamental premise of unequal distribution of power. Our goal is to change not just ourselves and other men but also the institutions that create inequality.
