= Land of a Million Elephants =

Land of a Million Elephants may refer to:

- English translation of Lan Xang, a Lao empire lasting from 1354 to 1707
- Lan Chang Province of Thailand (1941 - 46)
- The nickname for Laos
- The Title of Asa Baber's 1971 novel, based on his experiences as a United States Marine in Laos
