= Michael Kaufman (writer) =

Canadian writer, educator, and theorist

- Born: 27 March 1951 (age 75); Cleveland, Ohio

Academic background
- Education: University of Toronto
- Thesis: Jamaica under Manley, 1972-1980: the limits of social democratic reform (1974)

Academic work
- Institutions: York University, Toronto
- Main interests: White Ribbon Campaign (co-founder)

Michael Kaufman (born March 27, 1951) is a Canadian writer, educator, and theorist focused on engaging men and boys to promote gender equality, end violence against women, and end self-destructive ideals of manhood. He co-founded the White Ribbon Campaign in 1991, the largest network of men working to ending violence against women worldwide. Michael Kaufman also co-founded the Men for Women's Choice campaign with Gordon Cleveland in 1989. He is a senior fellow of Instituto Promundo, an NGO based in Rio de Janeiro and Washington, D.C.

== Background ==
Michael Kaufman was born in Cleveland, Ohio. He received a B.A. in Arts and Sciences from the University of Toronto, an M.A. in Political Economy from the University of Toronto, and a Ph.D. in Political Science from the University of Toronto. From 1979 until 1992, he taught primarily at York University in Toronto.

== Work ==
Michael Kaufman has worked as a lecturer and advisor to international NGOs, governments, universities and colleges, trade unions, and corporations. He has worked with many non-governmental organizations including Amnesty International, OXFAM, and Save the Children. He has worked extensively with the United Nations, including with UNESCO, UNICEF, UN Women, UNDP, UNFPA, and IFAD. He has written or edited eight books, as well as numerous reports and articles. His work has been widely translated and has appeared in The Guardian, The Daily Telegraph, The Toronto Star and other publications.

== Key Contributions ==
Michael Kaufman's work as co-founder and long-time volunteer with the White Ribbon Campaign in 1991, was based on the belief that a) the campaign should be decentralized, conceived of and led by the men and women within each community, b) that it should be politically non-partisan, reaching out to men across the political, religious, and social spectrum, and c) that it focus on a positive engagement of men and boys as individuals capable of bringing about change.

As a volunteer, he has been a leader in various national and international networks of profeminist men, including, most recently, MenCare, a global campaign focused on fatherhood which has the aim of men doing fifty percent of the care work on the planet.

== Key Ideas ==
Michael Kaufman's widely published 1987 article, "The Construction of Masculinity and the Triad of Men's Violence" postulated that our dominant forms of masculinity were constructed through ongoing, socially-sanctioned, and mutually reinforcing forms of violence: against women, against other men, and internalized against oneself.

"Men, Feminism, and Men's Contradictory Experiences of Power" (1994 and revised in 1999) built on the argument of his book, Cracking the Armour: Power, Pain and the Lives of Men to look at the contradictory nature of men's power.

His article, "The 7 P's of Men's Violence" (1999) has been translated into more than a dozen languages. It draws on key points of a feminist analysis of men's violence.

"The AIM Framework: Addressing and Involving Men and Boys to Promote Gender Equality and End Gender Discrimination and Violence" (2001) synthesizes lessons from two decades of work by many individuals and organizations with men and boys and suggests that efforts to engage men must not only address men and boys about the importance of gender equality.

== Selected publications ==
Books

- Kaufman, Michael (1985). Jamaica Under Manley: Dilemmas of Socialism & Democracy. Zed Books. OCLC 707054474.
- Kaufman, Michael, ed. (1987). Beyond Patriarchy: Essays by Men on Pleasure, Power, and Change. Oxford University Press. ISBN 9780195405347.
- Kaufman, Michael; Brod, Harry, eds. (1994). Theorizing Masculinities. Sage Publications. ISBN 9780803949041.
- Kaufman, Michael (1994). Cracking the Armour: Power, Pain and the Lives of Men. Viking/Penguin. ISBN 9780140177756.
- Kaufman, Michael; Alfonso, Haroldo Dilla, eds. (1997). Community Power & Grassroots Democracy: The Transformation of Social Life. Zed Books. ISBN 9780889367845.
- Kaufman, Michael (1999). The Possibility of Dreaming on a Night Without Stars. Viking/Penguin. ISBN 9780140280661.
- Kaufman, Michael; Kimmel, Michael (2011). The Guys' Guide to Feminism. Seal Press. ISBN 9781580054256.
- Kaufman, Michael; Barker, Gary (2015). The Afghan vampires book club. London: World Editions. ISBN 9789462380493.

Book chapters

- Kaufman, Michael (2001), "The construction of masculinity and the triad of men's violence", in Kimmel, Michael; Messner, Michael (eds.), Men's lives (5th ed.), Boston: Allyn and Bacon, ISBN 9780205321056.
