= White Ribbon Campaign =

Movement of men to end violence against women

- The logo of the White Ribbon Campaign
- Abbreviation: WRC
- Formation: November 1991
- Founders: Jack Layton, Ron Sluser, Michael Kaufman
- Type: Non-profit
- Purpose: Ending violence against women
- Headquarters: Toronto, Canada
- Executive director: Humberto Carolo
- Board of directors: Mona Mitchell (Chair), Jeff Feiner (Past Chair), Vipin Rikhi (Treasurer), Chris Langdon (Secretary), Kelly Davis, Mary Pompili, Sheamus Murphy, Joel Marans, Louie Surdi
- Website: whiteribbon.ca

The White Ribbon Campaign (WRC) is a global movement of men and boys working to end male violence against women and girls. It was established in November 1991 by a group of men in Toronto, Ontario, as a response to the École Polytechnique massacre of female students by Marc Lépine in 1989. The campaign was intended to raise awareness about the prevalence of male violence against women, with the ribbon symbolizing "the idea of men giving up their arms". The campaign spread to over 60 countries, with each White Ribbon chapter operating as a separate entity with its own governance.

== Background and establishment ==
On 6 December 1989, a mass shooting occurred at the École Polytechnique de Montréal in Montreal, Quebec, Canada. 25 year-old Marc Lépine killed ten women and four men and injured fifteen others before committing suicide by gunshot. A suicide note written by Lépine before the attack was later leaked to the press; in it, he claimed to be striking back against feminists who ruined his life and sought the social advantages of men.

In November 1991, a group of pro-feminist men in Toronto, Ontario, formed the White Ribbon campaign as a response to the attack. The campaign was intended to raise awareness about the prevalence of male violence against women, with the ribbon symbolizing "the idea of men giving up their arms".

== Description ==
The White Ribbon Campaign is active in over 60 countries, including Canada, the UK, Pakistan, Italy, and Australia. Each White Ribbon chapter works as a separate entity and with its own governance.

The movement seeks to promote healthy relationships, gender equity, and a compassionate vision of masculinity.

Much of the campaign's work is centered around the prevention of intimate partner violence, and includes educating and mentoring young men about issues such as violence and gender equality. Men and boys are encouraged to wear white ribbons as a symbol of their opposition to violence against women.

Wearing the ribbons is particularly encouraged during White Ribbon Week, which starts on 25 November, the International Day for the Elimination of Violence against Women.

== By country ==
=== White Ribbon Australia ===
In Australia in 2018, the day was moved from 25 to 23 November to become a specific campaign day separate to the international day, and expanded to encompass violence against children. Businesses are able to attain a "white ribbon accredited workplace", valid for three years.

In October 2018, White Ribbon Australia made plans to retract its position statement that women "should have complete control over their reproductive and sexual health", moving to an "agnostic" stance to consult with community stakeholders. Following criticism of the move, the original position statement was reinstated several hours later. The change in position occurred on the same morning the Parliament of Queensland voted to decriminalise abortion, which came after a lengthy process involving the Queensland Law Reform Commission (QLRC). White Ribbon Australia was referred to in the QLRC's Review of Termination of Pregnancy Laws Report, for its submission supporting the need for "nationally consistent access to safe and legal abortion".

On 3 October 2019, White Ribbon Australia, was placed into liquidation after posting a net loss of AU$840,000. By March 2020 a Western Australia-based community service organisation bought White Ribbon Australia, with the White Ribbon Canada executive director welcoming their commitment to collaborating to "challenge and support men and boys to realise their potential to be part of the solution in ending all forms of gender-based violence".

In June 2020 Brad Chilcott, a pastor at Activate Church in Adelaide and founder of the refugee advocacy organisation Welcome to Australia, was appointed CEO of White Ribbon Australia. He stated an intent to focus more on domestic violence, to move away from being a specific campaign engaging males in order to involve all Australians, and to move "from awareness to advocacy".

Some research papers have looked at the effectiveness of the White Ribbon Australia campaign strategies. Kate Seymour, in her 2017 article "'Stand up, speak out and act': A critical reading of Australia's White Ribbon campaign" wrote that White Ribbon Australia's "failure to articulate the meaning of both gender equality and respect is a crucial lack", and that "White Ribbon’s reliance on a binary view of gender, together with its emphasis on the attitudes and acts of individual men, contributes to the obscuration of men's collective advantage". A master's thesis by Daniel Pitman of Western Sydney University (2020), titled "Understanding White Ribbon: Its Emergence and Limits in Countering Men's Violence in Australia", notes criticism of the movement by some politicians and media.

=== White Ribbon UK ===
In November 2026 it was announced the British parliament would be the first to claim White Ribbon accreditation. New members of parliament would have their criminal records checked and it was proposed members would receive training. The changes were backed by the Speaker Lindsay Hoyle and they were proposed by a group led by Labour MP Emily Darlington. The idea was credited to the Canadian-inspired White Ribbon movement.

=== US Men's rights organisation (2014) ===
In 2014, the United States-based men's rights activist organisation A Voice for Men launched whiteribbon.org (since discontinued) as a counter to the White Ribbon campaign, adopting graphics and language from White Ribbon. It is owned by Erin Pizzey and has the slogan "Stop Violence Against Everyone". Accused of "hijacking" White Ribbon, the site was harshly criticized by Todd Minerson, the former executive director of the White Ribbon Campaign, who described it as "a copycat campaign articulating their archaic views and denials about the realities of gender-based violence". The site presents the claim that domestic violence is a learned behaviour from childhood, perpetrated equally by women and men. The website has faced much criticism, being accused of displaying "anti-feminist propaganda".
