= Rob Okun =

American writer-editor

Rob Okun is a writer-editor, activist known for his strong advocacy for the pro-feminist men's movement. He is a former executive director of the Men's Resource Center for Change (MRC), one of the earliest men's centers in North America. Okun is the editor of Voice Male, the magazine chronicling masculinities and men's engagement in the gender equity movement. Editor of books on political art and profeminism, his work has appeared in numerous publications and websites including Women's eNews, Ms., Counterpunch, The Telegraph of London, San Diego Union-Tribune, and Dallas Morning News among others.

== Biography ==
Beginning as an anti-Vietnam War activist, Okun's growing awareness of male-dominated leadership in the New Left led to his interest in feminism and pro-feminism. While serving as associate and executive director of the MRC, he transformed its organizational newsletter into Voice Male, a national publication chronicling the profeminist men's movement. He has been its editor since 1996. Topics range from men and violence to boys becoming men; fathering to male survivors of abuse; and men and feminism, men's health, GBTQ issues. Voice Male emphasizes "the social transformation of masculinities in the world today." Okun is known for his outspoken views against gender-based violence and advocating that men must take more active roles in preventing violence. He is a frequent op-ed contributor to Ms., V-Day, AlterNet, and other publications, and the editor of two books: The Rosenbergs: Collected Visions of Artists and Writers and Voice Male: The Untold Story of the Profeminist Men's Movement.

VOICE MALE: The Untold Story of the Profeminist Men’s Movement chronicles the transformation of men and masculinity through the pages of the magazine, bringing readers inside “one of the most important social justice movements most people have never heard of”—the anti-sexist men's movement. The new edition of the book was published at the end of 2017.

Women's eNews selected Okun as one of 21 Leaders for the 21st Century honored May 7, 2018, at the global news site's annual awards gala in New York City. Recipients include a range of gender equity leaders whose work promote the rights of women and girls. Okun is also the recipient of the 2018 Gordon Gray Outstanding Male Leadership Award. Okun is on the board of directors of the Center for the Study of Men and Masculinities and North American MenEngage. Okun's magazine, Voice Male is a member of the MenEngage Alliance, an international network of nearly 700 organizations worldwide working with men and boys for gender equality. MenEngage was first founded by Sonke Gender Justice in South Africa and Promundo in Brazil.

Okun's writing has appeared in numerous newspapers and on websites across the U.S. and his columns and commentaries are syndicated by PeaceVoice. Women's eNews selected Okun as one of its "21 Leaders for the 21st Century" at the global news site's annual awards event in New York City. Recipients include a range of gender equity leaders whose work promotes the rights of women and girls. Okun received the 2018 Gordon Gray Outstanding Male Leadership Award. One of his op-eds on gender and mass shootings in the aftermath of the Parkland, Florida school shooting calls on student activists to add gender to their gun control organizing. Okun is on the steering committees of North American MenEngage and the Center for the Study of Men and Masculinities . He and Voice Male are members of the MenEngage Alliance, an international network of 700 organizations in some 75 countries working with men and boys for gender equality.
