= Men's movement =

Social movement

The men's movement is a social movement that emerged in the 1960s and 1970s, primarily in Western countries, which consists of groups and organizations of men and their allies who focus on gender issues and whose activities range from self-help and support to lobbying and activism.

The men's movement is made up of several movements that have differing and often antithetical goals. Major components of the men's movement include the men's liberation movement, masculinism, profeminist men's movement, herbivore men's movement, mythopoetic men's movement, men's rights movement, and the Christian men's movement, most notably represented by the Promise Keepers.

== Men's liberation movement ==
The men's movement consisted of "networks of men self-consciously involved in activities relating to men and gender. It emerged in the late 1960s and 1970s in Western societies, alongside and often in response to the women's movement and feminism." Whilst bearing many of the hallmarks of therapeutic, self-help groups, men's movement groupings have increasingly come to view personal growth and better relations with other men as "useless without an accompanying shift in the social relations and ideologies that support or marginalise different ways of being men". Men's movement activists who are sympathetic to feminist standpoints have been greatly concerned with deconstructing male identity and masculinity. Taking a cue from early feminists who criticized the traditional female gender role, members of the men's liberation movement used the language of sex role theory to argue that the male gender role was similarly restrictive and damaging to men. Some men's liberationists decontextualized gender relations and argued that since sex roles were equally harmful to both sexes women and men were equally oppressed.

Sociologist Michael Messner writes that by the late 1970s,

[M]en's liberation had disappeared. The conservative and moderate wings of men's liberation became an anti-feminist men's rights movement, facilitated by the language of sex roles. The progressive wing of men's liberation abandoned sex role language and formed a profeminist movement premised on a language of gender relations and power.

== Men's and fathers' rights movements ==
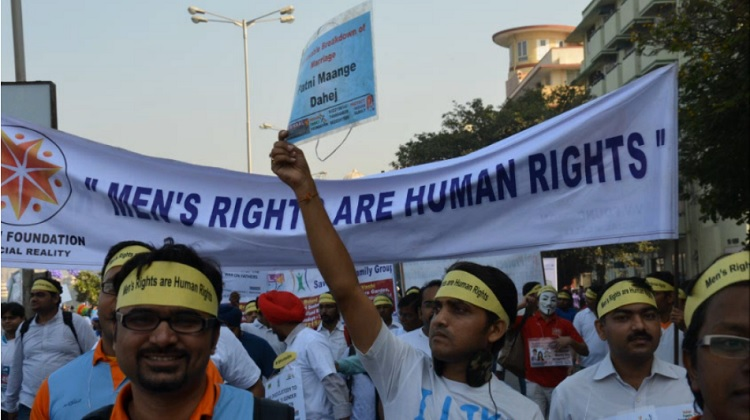
Men's Rights Movement Rally, India

The men's rights movement branched off from the men's liberation movement in the mid- to late 1970s. It focused specifically on issues of perceived discrimination and inequalities faced by men. The MRM has been involved in a variety of issues related to law (including family law, parenting, reproduction and domestic violence), government services (including education, military service and social safety nets) health.

The fathers' rights movement is a subset of the men's rights movement. Its members are primarily interested in issues related to family law, including child custody and child support that affect fathers and their children.

Prominent men's rights activists include Paul Elam (A Voice for Men), Warren Farrell, Herb Goldberg, Richard Doyle, and Asa Baber. Glenn Sacks is a fathers' rights activist.

== Pro-feminist men's movements ==
The profeminist men's movement emerged from the men's liberation movement in the mid 1970s. The first Men and Masculinity Conference, held in Tennessee in 1975, was one of the first organized activities by profeminist men in the United States. The profeminist men's movement was influenced by second-wave feminism, the Black Power and student activism movement, the anti-war movement, and LGBT social movements of the 1960s and 1970s. It is the strand of the men's movement that generally embraces the egalitarian goals of feminism.

The feminist movement refers to a series of political campaigns for reforms on issues such as reproductive rights, domestic violence, maternity leave, equal pay, women's suffrage, sexual harassment, and sexual violence. The term is most often used to talk about men who support feminism and its efforts to bring about the political, economic, cultural, personal, and social equality of women with men. Many profeminist men believe that masculinity is caused by homophobia and that the dominant model of masculinity is heterosexuality. Men who actively support feminism attempt to bring about gender justice and equality. Their sympathy for feminism revolves around a simple acceptance that men and women should be equal. Women should have the access to jobs and areas of public life as do men. The problem is that there are two general systems, the one fundamentally based on hierarchy and privilege and the other system profeminist men disagree on, arguing that they must change the content of models of masculinity rather than get rid of notions of masculinity and femininity altogether. The fear of being seen as gay prevents boys and men from questioning and ultimately abandoning traditional masculinity. Many pro-feminist men thus believe that men and masculinity will not change much until homophobia is radically undermined. Men have a vital role to play in the transformation of gender relations begun by feminism and the women's movements. Pro-feminist men are welcome and important participants in this process. "Studies of representations of masculinity in the media often highlight constructions that center masculinity around notions of violence, control, aggression."

Profeminist men have questioned the cultural ideal of traditional masculinity. They often argue that social expectations and norms have forced men into rigid gender roles, limited men's ability to express themselves, and restricted their choices to behaviors regarded as socially acceptable for men. Moreover, profeminist men have sought to disestablish sexism and reduce discrimination against women. They have campaigned alongside feminists on a variety of issues, including the Equal Rights Amendment, reproductive rights, laws against employment discrimination, affordable child care, and to end sexual violence against women.

"Feminist men's movements have organised around the rejection of traditional styles of masculinity in support of feminist women's movements. They exist in many countries and many feminist men's groups focus on involving men in anti-violence work." NOMAS in the United States, the Achilles Heel Collective in the UK and Men Against Sexual Assault in Australia are some of the better known feminist men's movements although the organizations that are globally known are still fairly small and unstable with low membership rates. Achilles Heel was one of the most prominent pro feminist men's groups. It revolved around the bi annual magazine, Achilles Heel and aimed "to challenge traditional forms of masculinity and male power and support the creation of alternative social structures and personal ways of being." "Feminist campaigns such as #MeToo have prompted large numbers of men to reflect on their own sexual and social relations with women, although there is pushback and backlash too." Criticisms of some pro feminist men's campaigns have been that they do too little, simply signing a form or wearing a ribbon instead of taking real action such as addressing their own behaviour and the behaviour of their peers. While feminism has recently gained more traction in society, it has allowed for more men to adopt tokenistic support for feminism which lacks real substance.

In more recent decades following the beginning of the profeminist men's movement in the United States, similar and interconnected initiatives have been organized internationally. In 2004, a number of leaders involved with engaging men and boys in gender justice around the world came together to form the global organization MenEngage. Since then MenEngage has organized two international conferences; one in Rio de Janeiro in 2009 and another in New Delhi in 2014.

Significant profeminist writers include David Tacey and Raewyn Connell, Robert Jensen, Jackson Katz, and Don Edgar.

== Mythopoetic men's movement ==
The mythopoetic men's movement is based on spiritual perspectives derived from psychoanalysis, and especially the work of Carl Jung. It is less political than either the profeminist or men's rights movement and has a self-help focus. It is called "mythopoetic" because of the emphasis on mythology communicated as poetry with some appropriation of indigenous, e.g. Native American, mythology and knowledge. Robert Bly, a leading mythopoetic, has criticized "soft men" and argued that boys must be initiated into manhood in order to possess "Zeus energy", which according to Bly is "male authority" that "encompasses intelligence, robust health, compassionate decisiveness, good will, generous leadership". Mythopoetic men emphasize "elder honouring", "reclaiming" fathers, and "unleashing the wild man within", but with an emphasis on the impact of fatherlessness on men's psychological development.

Masculinity is seen to include deep unconscious patterns and archetypes that are revealed through myth, story and ritual, as supported by theories drawn from analytical or "depth" psychology.

There is some overlap with men's rights and men's liberation perspectives.

Activities include:

- Male mentoring programs (based on the belief that mature males should help boys to become healthy men)
- Ritual, drumming and storytelling camps
- Support groups
- Attempts at developing curricula for boys' programs in schools

Robert Bly, James Hillman, Michael J. Meade, Sam Keen, Robert L. Moore, and Stephen Biddulph are prominent mythopoetic authors.

== Terminology ==
Sociologists Michael Messner and Michael Flood have argued separately that the term movement is problematic as, unlike other social movements, the men's movement has mostly been focused on self-improvement, is internally contradictory, and consists of members of what they argue is a privileged group.

== See also ==
- International Men's Day
- ManKind Project
- Masculism
- The Abolition of Man
- Men's studies
- Pater familias
- Paternal rights and abortion
- Paternity fraud
- Responsible fatherhood movement
- Violence against men
