= Mike Buchanan (politician) =

British founder of Justice for Men and Boys

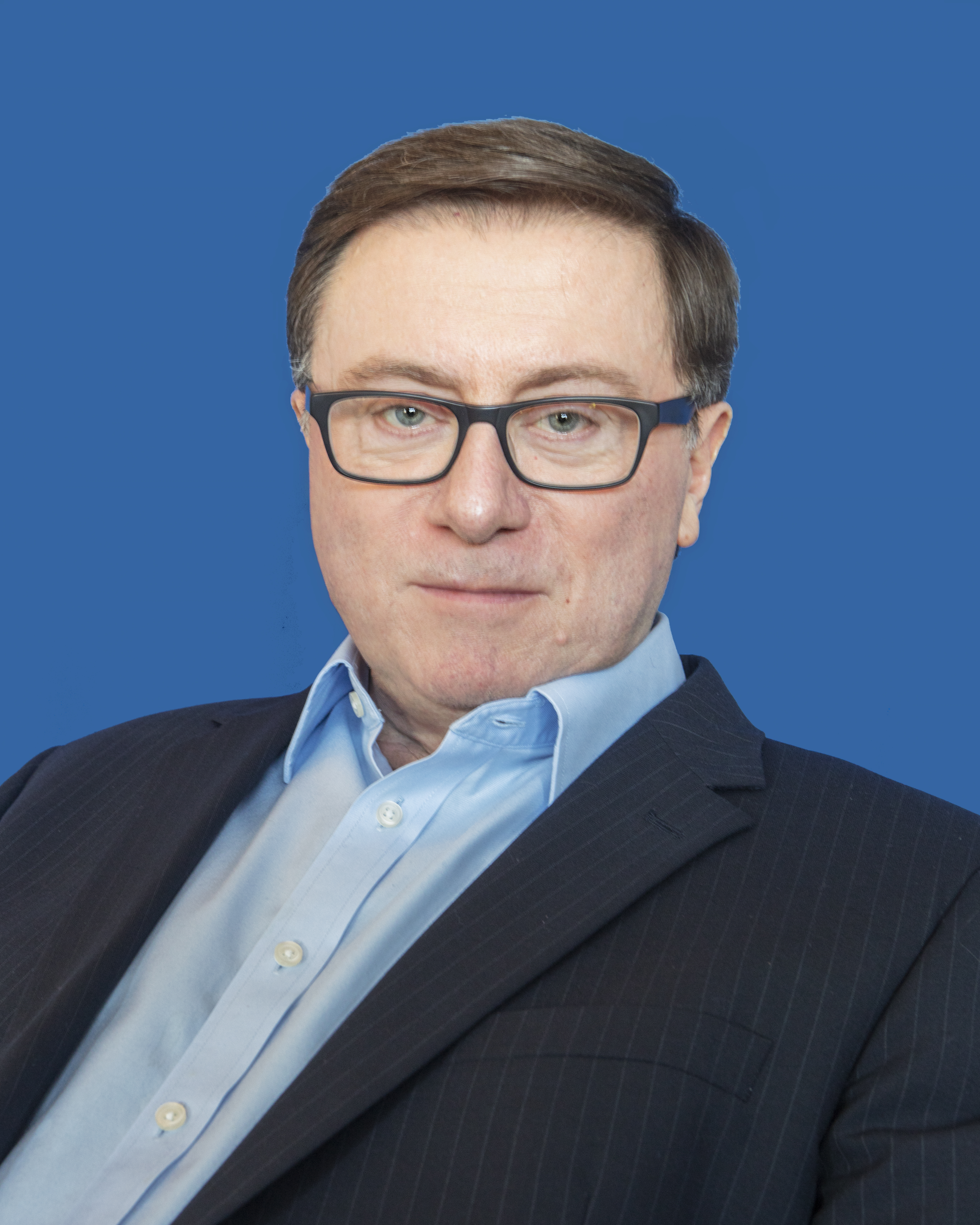

Leader of Justice for Men and Boys (and the Women Who Love Them)
- In office 6 February 2013 – 26 May 2020
- Preceded by: Office established
- Succeeded by: Elizabeth Hobson
- In office 21 March 2021 – 31 March 2023
- Preceded by: Elizabeth Hobson
- Succeeded by: Office abolished

Personal details
- Born: Gordon Michael Alexander Buchanan; 8 December 1957 (age 68)
- Party: Justice for Men and Boys (and the Women Who Love Them)
- Spouse: Twice divorced
- Children: Two daughters
- Website: Justice for Men and Boys (and the Women Who Love Them)

Gordon Michael Alexander Buchanan (born 8 December 1957) is a retired businessman and men's rights activist, who founded and for two separate periods has led the organisation Justice for Men and Boys (and the Women Who Love Them) (J4MB), which formerly operated as a minor political party, in the United Kingdom.

== Career ==
Buchanan was a company director for Link Procurement Services Ltd from 1999 to 2010, and also for Legal Procurement Services Ltd from 2005 to 2008.

He also worked as a consultant for the Conservative Party, but left the party in 2009 after David Cameron announced his approval of all-women shortlists for selecting parliamentary candidates, accusing Cameron of being "relentlessly pro-female and anti-male" in his policies and comments.

=== Campaign for Merit in Business ===
In April 2012, he began the 'Campaign for Merit in Business' arguing against increasing gender diversity in the boardroom (GDITB). The campaign submitted written evidence to a House of Lords European Union Sub-Committee on the Internal Market, Infrastructure and Employment which was investigating 'Women on Boards'. The sub-committee also heard from the campaign's Research Director, Michael Klein. The sub-committee found that "[a] more balanced board [would] be able to tap into the wealth of available talent in the labour market, provide a broader spectrum of ideas, better reflect a company's customer base, and improve corporate governance.", but went on to say, "that quotas should not be resorted to until all other options have been exhausted."

Later in the same year, Buchanan appeared before the House of Commons Business, Innovation and Skills Committee's inquiry, 'Women in the Workplace', alongside former UKIP local election candidate Steve Moxon, sociologist Catherine Hakim and business executive Heather McGregor. At the committee, Buchanan described himself as the campaign's chief executive, and saying that in November 2012, the campaign consisted of ten members. In written evidence to the inquiry, he cited five longitudinal studies, which he entitled 'Improving' Gender Diversity on Boards Leads to a Decline in Corporate Performance: The Evidence. In response to the committee's report the coalition Government said the report, "[reflected] the view of the Government and the Women's Business Council that there is a clear benefit from ensuring that those women who want to work, or want to work more hours, are able to contribute fully to the economy."

=== Anti-Feminism League ===
Buchanan also began the Anti-Feminism League in 2012. A year later, its website, called Fightingfeminism, which academic Alva Träbert described as "mak[ing] its opposition to feminism explicit" and based in part on Buchanan's "experience at the boardroom level of multinational corporations", was merged into the Campaign for Merit in Business and the political party, Justice for Men and Boys.

=== Justice for Men and Boys ===
The political party Justice for Men and Boys (and the Women Who Love Them) or J4MB for short, which Buchanan led, was founded on 6 February 2013, and registered with the Electoral Commission on 21 February 2013.

Buchanan said he established the party because "the state is anti-male" and considers the male sex to be "pretty much subhuman". According to him, "legislation is routinely drafted to advantage women and disadvantage men" while "boys are being relentlessly disadvantaged by an ever more feminized education system". He also formed such groups as the Anti-Feminism League and Men Shouldn't Marry.

J4MB described itself as "the only political party in the English-speaking world campaigning for the human rights of men and boys" and as being anti-feminist. The academic Ana Jordan noted that Buchanan "has been openly vitriolic about feminism and feminists". "Feminism is a hatred, and it should be a badge of shame," Buchanan has said. According to him, "It's a very well documented feminist objective of 40 years to destroy the nuclear family," and feminism "is a deeply vile, corrupting ideology and the idea it's a benign movement about gender equality is dangerous nonsense." He says, "All feminist narratives are one or more of the following – conspiracy theories, fantasies, lies, delusions or myths."

J4MB issues awards for "lying feminist of the month" to female journalists, "toxic feminist of the month" and "whiny feminist of the month", with recipients including Laura Bates and Caroline Criado-Perez. The Observer columnist Catherine Bennett wrote in 2015, "The treatment of one such J4MB target, Laura Bates, founder of the Everyday Sexism Project, is such that it might easily be mistaken for stalking, at least since headlines such as 'Will someone change Laura Bates's diaper' on a blog, were followed by Mr Buchanan, the would-be public servant, bothering the audience in a bookshop where she was about to speak." J4MB's website includes a link to an article entitled "13 reasons women lie about being raped".

Buchanan relinquished his role as leader of the party to Elizabeth Hobson in May 2020, but re-assumed it after Hobson resigned in March 2021. In April 2022, it was announced that the party was changing its name to the Children & Family Party. In November 2022 the party reverted to its original name, though the Electoral Commission requested the dropping of the "and the Women Who Love Them" portion. J4MB was de-registered as a political party on 31 March 2023, and in June 2023, its website stated,"J4MB is no longer a party, but its mission remains unchanged." Buchanan continues to lead the organisation.

==== 2015 general election ====
In its manifesto for the 2015 general election, the party explored twenty areas in which it believes the human rights of men and boys in the UK are being violated. In this document, the party advocated compulsory paternity tests regardless of the mother's marital status or her testimony about who the father was, cutting funds intended to encourage women to enter science, and cutting the abortion limit for women whose pregnancy threatens their mental health from 24 to 13 weeks. Parents should be able to send their sons to schools with only male teachers because female teachers are assumed to favour girls in the awarding of marks. They also advocate that men should be able to retire earlier than women, because males work harder and die younger. The section on sexual abuse concentrates on female offenders, and the issue of rape and assaults annually committed against women in the UK is avoided. The higher level of male suicide is blamed on the state for favouring women over men. According to The Week, the manifesto "quotes extensively from the Daily Mail, Wikipedia and anti-feminist blogs including JudgyBitch.com". Journalists Ellen Halliday and Kim Darrah write that in the manifesto, "Buchanan also encourages men to take 'the red pill', a reference to the ideology of incels – extremists, usually men, who express extreme hostility and hatred towards the people, usually women, who they blame for what they believe is their involuntary celibacy".

Writing about the party's manifesto launch and the media coverage it generated, The Observer columnist Catherine Bennett wrote, "Before long, many more voters should be familiar with his organisation's gormless/whiny/lying feminists of the month announcements and enthusiasm for personal attacks, to a point that eclipses its more persuasive concerns about, say, male suicide or judgments in the divorce courts." Laura Bates has written that the party "achieve[d] a significant sweep of media coverage", and that "In his new status as a politician, Buchanan was also given free rein to opine unchallenged about the 'myth' of the glass ceiling." Bates notes, "Although much of the coverage was critical, the very fact that such quotes appeared in the national press in the context of a political leader running for office helps to provide MRA ideology with a sense of legitimacy and acceptability, while also serving as a gateway for potentially susceptible converts, who might go on to access some of the movement's more extreme online spaces as a result." She notes as an example one newspaper article that described Buchanan as an author of three books, without specifying that the books had been self-published.

The party stood for election for the first time at the 2015 general election, with two candidates in Nottinghamshire seats. Party leader Mike Buchanan stood in Ashfield against the Shadow Minister for Women and Equalities, Gloria De Piero. Buchanan came last with 153 votes out of 47,409 cast. Ray Barry stood in Broxtowe, against sitting Conservative MP Anna Soubry, and also came last with 63 votes out of 53,440 cast.

If Labour had formed a government in 2015, Buchanan said its leading female politicians would have been given "free rein to roll out yet more radical feminist agendas, teaching schoolboys to be feminists, ie brainwashing them into becoming lifelong unquestioning slaves to women".

==== Later activities ====
The party co-hosted the 2016 International Conference on Men's Issues (ICMI16) in London, between 8 and 10 July 2016 in association with A Voice for Men. Conservative member of parliament Philip Davies, a member of the Justice Select Committee, spoke to the conference and asserted that the criminal justice system favours women's over men's rights. Davies was not paid for his appearance at the conference.

Buchanan announced that he was not standing in the 2017 United Kingdom general election, although he had previously intended to be a candidate in Maidenhead against Theresa May, the Prime Minister.

The 2018 International Conference on Men's Issues (ICMI18), again in association with A Voice for Men, was due to have taken place at St Andrew's Stadium, the home of Birmingham City Football Club, between 6 and 8 July 2018. However, in early November 2017 the club in a statement said that "after certain details concerning the organisers came to light, the Club investigated further and concluded this is not something we want to be associated with" and that it had been "misled at the time of booking". Buchanan initially said he still intended for the conference to go ahead at St Andrew's as he felt he had "a perfectly good and legally binding contract". He later decided to seek a new venue either in Birmingham or London. He announced on his party's website on 1 December 2017, that a contract had been signed with a new venue in London, for a conference on 20–22 July 2018. Three days after the conference finished openDemocracy revealed the venue was the ExCeL.

In April 2019, Buchanan announced on the Justice for Men and Boys website a new strategy of giving talks at universities, in a bid to engage with students and academics, particularly those studying subjects such as politics and history. The first talks were scheduled at the University of Cambridge on 24 May 2019. Following an open letter from students and academics to the Vice-Chancellor, demanding the talks be cancelled, the venue was altered to a non-departmental building. University staff claimed that J4MB had engaged in harassment of female academics. Before Buchanan was due to give his speech on "Equal Rights for Men and Women", a student threw a milkshake over him in a Cambridge pub. The event went ahead, with students protesting outside the venue and linking hands to try to block J4MB members from entering. An attendee at the event was accused of assaulting two of the student protestors. It was later reported that two students had been fined £75 each for the milkshaking and that no action had been taken against the party member who had been accused of assaulting student protestors.

==== Electoral Commission and finance ====
The Electoral Commission report on expenditure by political parties in the UK General Election 2015 noted that, for political parties with financial returns of less than £250,000, Justice for Men and Boys was one of the top ten highest spending with a total expenditure of £11,423.

The party's full accounts since inception are as follows:

	2013	2014	2015	2016	2017
Donations	£6,051.00	£9,266.00	£9,534.00	£7,037.00	£4,775.00
Membership fees	£0.00	£0.00	£1,587.00	£1,985.00	£9,512.00
Miscellaneous income	£85.00	£0.00	£0.00	£0.00	£0.00
Total income	£6,136.00	£9,266.00	£11,121.00	£9,022.00	£14,287.00
Total expenditure	£1,470.00	£8,288.00	£14,677.00	£4,307.00	£13,566.00

==== Parliamentary elections ====
General election, 7 May 2015

Constituency	Candidate	Votes	%
Ashfield	Mike Buchanan	153	0.3
Broxtowe	Ray Barry	63	0.1

=== Campaign against circumcision ===
Buchanan and J4MB have campaigned against circumcision, with Buchanan claiming that it breaches the Offences against the Person Act 1861. He includes "the non-therapeutic [e.g. religious] circumcision of male minors" in his definition of genital mutilation and is critical of the media's focus on female genital mutilation arguing that, "[t]he foreskin is a biological equivalent to the clitoral hood, not the hymen."

In April 2016, it was reported that J4MB was planning anti-circumcision protests in Golders Green, London, including outsides the offices of the Jewish Chronicle, as well as outside the Home Office and the headquarters of the National Society for the Prevention of Cruelty to Children in central London.

==== Conviction for obstructing the highway ====
In July 2018, the High Court in London upheld Buchanan's conviction for obstructing the highway. Buchanan was arrested in June 2016 during a protest against male circumcision and convicted in October 2016. Rejecting Buchanan's appeal the judge, Lord Justice Hickinbottom, said, "Buchanan had been perfectly legitimately protesting on the pavement. But he had then walked alone into the road and stood in front of cars as they tried to pass at the end of the working day. Standing there clearly put him at risk of serious injury - and he understood that risk, and was determined to take it - but it also put others at risk of injury or risked damage to property." The court also added a further £2,424 to his court bill of £3,603, bringing it to a total of £6,027.

== Media appearances ==
The former businessman has made a number of appearances in the media including: arguing against more women on corporate boards (Daily Politics); discussing sexism with Caroline Criado-Perez (This Morning); discussing Justice for Men and Boys' 2015 election manifesto (Sunday Politics, East Midlands); considering the question "does absence of refusal to have sex amount to consent?" (The Big Questions); discussing politics with a feminist (Sunday Politics, East Midlands); discussing the junior barrister Charlotte Proudman's rebuke of Alexander Carter-Silk, a senior City solicitor for complimenting her on her LinkedIn profile photograph (Sky News); appearing on a documentary about sexism (BBC Three); discussing whether you can be a successful working mother (Sky News); discussing Nottinghamshire Police's decision to become the first police force within the UK to begin recording misogyny as a hate crime (Victoria Derbyshire); discussing the gender pay gap, citing a blog by William Collins (The Roundtable); discussing the #MeToo phenomenon (Sunday Morning Live); discussing the allocation of chores between genders, advocating Catherine Hakim's preference theory (Sky News); and discussing Swayne O'Pie's campaign to establish a Minister for Men (comparable to the Minister for Women) (RT UK).

Amongst the views he expressed are: "the number of qualified men for major corporate boards hugely outnumbers the number of qualified women"; "all the [major political] parties are institutionally pro-female and anti-male"; explaining why the UK legal definition of rape states that a woman can not legally rape a man, "the Sexual Offences Act 2003 was drawn up by radical feminists"; "men will support women as stay-at-home partners or parents and women won't"; "Charlotte Proudman clearly suffers from an all too common mental health condition 'whiny feminist disorder'"; "feminism is a female supremacy movement driven by misandry, the hatred of men, it's a vile ideology"; "this whole narrative about work being fulfilling, and exciting, and interesting, and looking after children being stressful and mundane, it's a feminist narrative that just doesn't make sense for the vast majority of women"; "I don't think any sane person believe that wolf-whistling is evidence of misogyny, only feminists could believe such a ridiculous thing [...] because it's the sign of a man's admiration for a woman"; "Martin Fiebert [list of] hundreds of studies show that women are at least as physically aggressive towards opposite sex partners as men"; "[w]e know that both male and female teachers have an in-built bias towards marking girls better than boys"; and "[f]eminism is not about gender equality it is about ever more privileging of women and always has been".

== Personal life ==
Buchanan is twice divorced, and has two daughters.

== Publications ==
Books

- Buchanan, Mike (2007). Profitable buying strategies: how to cut procurement costs and buy your way to higher profits. London Philadelphia: Kogan Page. ISBN 9780749452384.

Self-published books

Buchanan has also published several books through his own publishing company, LPS Publishing. One of these, Feminism: The Ugly Truth (2012), features a cover photo of a female vampire, which scholar Linda Mizejewski describes as "a repulsive female zombie, her mouth red with blood and jagged with fangs"; in it, Buchanan writes that "it would be dishonest to deny the evidence before us – that feminists are generally less attractive than normal women" and that "my theory is that many feminists are profoundly stupid as well as hateful, a theory which could readily be tested by arresting a number of them and forcing them – with the threat of denying them access to chocolate – to undertake IQ tests".

Articles

- Buchanan, Mike (8 August 2012). "Socialism's Trojan Horse: "Improved" gender diversity in the boardroom". The Commentator. Archived from the original on 11 October 2017.
- Buchanan, Mike (6 March 2013). "Comment: Why Britain needs a pro-male party". Politics.
- Buchanan, Mike (9 March 2015). "Cameron's naive crusade for boardroom gender diversity will only hurt Britain". International Business Times.
- Buchanan, Mike (24 March 2015). "Male suicide scandal: UK men are paying for a system that drives thousands of them to death". International Business Times.

== Bibliography ==
- Anderson, Eric; Magrath, Rory (2019). Men and Masculinities. London: Routledge. ISBN 9781138081802.
- Bates, Laura (2020). Men Who Hate Women: From Incels to Pickup Artists, the Truth about Extreme Misogyny and How It Affects Us All. London: Simon and Schuster. ISBN 9781471152276.
- Cutas, Daniela; Smajdor, Anna (2020). "'Duped Fathers', 'Cuckoo Children', and the Problem of Basing Fatherhood on Biology: A Philosophical Analysis". In Beier, Katharina; Brügge, Claudia; Thorn, Petra; Wiesemann, Claudia (eds.). Assistierte Reproduktion mit Hilfe Dritter. Berlin: Springer. pp. 171–182. doi:10.1007/978-3-662-60298-0_11. ISBN 9783662602973. S2CID 213496040.
- Hermansson, Patrik; Lawrence, David; Mulhall, Joe; Murdoch, Simon (2020). The International Alt-Right: Fascism for the 21st Century?. London: Routledge. ISBN 9781138363403.
- Jordan, Ana (2016). "Conceptualizing Backlash: (UK) Men's Rights Groups, Anti-Feminism, and Postfeminism". Canadian Journal of Women and the Law. 28 (1): 18–44. doi:10.3138/cjwl.28.1.18. S2CID 146609049.
- Keith, T. (2017). Masculinities in Contemporary American Culture: An Intersectional Approach to the Complexities and Challenges of Male Identity. New York, NY: Routledge. ISBN 9781317595359.
- Mizejewski, Linda (2014). Pretty/Funny: Women Comedians and Body Politics. Austin, TX: University of Texas Press. ISBN 9780292756915.
- O'Donnell, Jessica (2022). Gamergate and Anti-Feminism in the Digital Age. Cham: Palgrave Macmillan. ISBN 9783031140563.
- Savigny, Heather (2019). "The Violence of Impact: Unpacking Relations Between Gender, Media and Politics". Political Studies Review. 18 (2): 277–293. doi:10.1177/1478929918819212. hdl:2086/17327. S2CID 150340651.
- Träbert, Alva (2017). "At the Mercy of Femocracy? Networks and Ideological Links Between Far-Right Movements and the Antifeminist Men's Rights Movement". In Köttig, Michaela; Bitzan, Renate; Petö, Andrea (eds.). Gender and Far Right Politics in Europe. Cham: Palgrave Macmillan. pp. 273–288. doi:10.1007/978-3-319-43533-6_18. ISBN 9783319435329.
- Xu, Alex J.; Mishra, Kirtishri; Zhao, Lee C. (2022). "Heineke-Mikulicz Preputioplasty: Surgical Technique and Outcomes". Urology. 166: 271–276. doi:10.1016/j.urology.2022.03.030. PMID 35430235. S2CID 248198492.
