= Kenneth Clatterbaugh =

American philosopher

Kenneth C. Clatterbaugh

Education
- Education: University of Iowa; Indiana University Bloomington

Philosophical work
- Institutions: University of Washington
- Main interests: Modern philosophy, social philosophy, and gender studies, philosophy of religion.

Kenneth C. Clatterbaugh is an American philosopher. He was Chair of the department of Philosophy at the University of Washington for fifteen years. He retired in 2012. His interests are modern philosophy, social philosophy, and gender studies, philosophy of religion. His latest book is a satirical look at some aspects of American Christianity. It is a novel, not an academic book although it contains considerable philosophical argument.

He graduated from University of Iowa in 1962, received the Wilson Fellowship following his graduation. He received his Ph.D. from Indiana University Bloomington in 1967.

== Works (selection) ==
=== Books ===
- Clatterbaugh, Kenneth C. (1997). Contemporary perspectives on masculinity: men, women, and politics in modern society (2nd ed.). Boulder, Colorado: Westview Press. ISBN 9780813327013.
- Clatterbaugh, Kenneth C. (1999). The causation debate in modern philosophy, 1637-1739. New York: Routledge. ISBN 9780415914772.
- Clatterbaugh, Kenneth C. (2016). The freedom of will. Victoria, BC, Canada: Friesen Press. ISBN 9781460283035.

=== Book chapters ===
- Clatterbaugh, Kenneth (1992), "Are men oppressed?", in Strikwerda, Robert; May, Larry, eds. (1992). Rethinking masculinity: philosophical explorations in light of feminism. Lanham, Maryland: Littlefield Adams Quality Paperbacks. pp. 289–306. ISBN 9780822630210.

- Reprinted in: Clatterbaugh, Kenneth (1997), "The oppression debate in sexual politics", in Mappes, Thomas A.; Zembaty, Jane S. (eds.), Social ethics: morality and social policy (5th ed.), New York: McGraw-Hill, pp. 287–296, ISBN 9780070401433

- Clatterbaugh, Kenneth (1995), "Mythopoetic foundations and new age patriarchy", in Kimmel, Michael S., ed. (1995). The politics of manhood. Philadelphia: Temple University Press. pp. 44–63. ISBN 9781566393652.
- Clatterbaugh, Kenneth (2007), "Definitions of: "Masculinity Politics", "Men's Rights", "Men's Liberation", and "Anti-Feminism"", in Flood, Michael; Kegan Gardiner, Judith; Pease, Bob; Pringle, Keith (eds.), International encyclopedia of men and masculinities, London and New York: Routledge, ISBN 9780415333436
- Clatterbaugh, Kenneth (2009), "Modern causation before Hume", in Beebee, Helen; Hitchcock, Christopher; Menzies, Peter (eds.), The Oxford handbook of causation, Oxford and New York: Oxford University Press, ISBN 9780199279739

=== Articles ===
- Clatterbaugh, Kenneth (April 1995). "Cartesian causality, explanation, and divine concurrence". History of Philosophy Quarterly. 12 (2). University of Illinois Press: 195–207. JSTOR 27744659.
- Clatterbaugh, Kenneth; Bobro, Marc (July 1996). "Unpacking the Monad: Leibniz's Theory of Causality". The Monist. 79 (3): 408–425. doi:10.5840/monist199679320. JSTOR 27903491. (Causality before Hume.)
- Clatterbaugh, Kenneth (July 1998). "What is problematic about 'masculinities'?". Men and Masculinities. 1 (1): 24–45. doi:10.1177/1097184X98001001002. S2CID 145220554.

=== Articles online ===
- www.menweb.org Whose Keepers, What Promises? (1995)

== See also ==
- American philosophy
- List of American philosophers
