= A Voice for Men =

Men's rights organization

A Voice for Men (AVfM)
- Formation: 2009; 17 years ago
- Founder: 2009-2022 Paul Elam
- Purpose: Men's issues, antifeminism
- Headquarters: 2009-2022 Houston, Texas, U.S.
- Region served: Headquartered in the US and since 2022 in Australia, international audience
- Publishers: Paul Elam, Robert Brockway
- Website: avoiceformen.com

A Voice for Men, also known as Voices of Men Network and by initialisms VoMN, AVfM and AV4M, is a large and influential publication within the wider men's rights movement.

== History ==
It was founded in 2009 by Paul Elam as a for profit limited liability company based in the United States with an associated online publication; since 2022 it was refounded as a sole proprietorship in Australia by Robert Brockway. The organization's editorial position is strongly antifeminist; it frequently accuses feminists of being misandrist.

A Voice for Men hosts radio shows, has a forum, and posts articles on its website. It occasionally features groups. AVFM's staff members and contributors are unpaid volunteers with the exception of the founder. The site's online store, called "The Red Pill Shop" after the red pill meme, sells T-shirts, cell phone covers, and holiday decorations. The site also accepts financial donations. Elam says "every dollar goes right in my pocket"; he also asserts that the money is used to advance the group's cause. In 2014, Dun & Bradstreet estimated AVFM's annual revenue as $120,000 and said it had one employee.

In March 2011, AVFM launched a broadcasting franchise on BlogTalkRadio. Elam hosted the first broadcast.

== Activities ==
In early 2011, AVFM created the website Register-Her, a wiki page that initially listed the names, addresses, and other personal information of women convicted of murdering or raping men. Later, the site's operators expanded the registry include women they judged guilty of "false rape accusations" or "anti-male bigotry". They also began publishing personal information about women who participated in protests against the men's rights movement (MRM), who mocked the MRM on social media, or who publicly supported feminism. Elam said that there would no longer be "any place to hide on the internet" for "lying bitches". The site was closed for a time, but restored at different web address (at least, until February 18, 2020).

In 2014, AVFM launched a website called White Ribbon, adopting graphics and language from the White Ribbon Campaign, a violence-prevention program established in 1991. AVFM's White Ribbon site argued that women's shelters were "hotbeds of gender hatred" and that "corrupt academics" had conspired to conceal violence against men. The website was harshly criticized by White Ribbon executive director Todd Minerson, who said the AVFM White Ribbon website was a "misguided attempt to discredit others" and urged its supporters "not to be fooled by this copycat campaign".

AVFM individuals helped set up the first International Conference on Men's Issues, held in June 2014 in Detroit, Michigan, a city chosen, Elam said, because it represents "masculinity". It was attended by a few hundred men and a few women. Speakers included Mike Buchanan from the UK's Justice for Men and Boys (J4MB) party and Warren Farrell. Topics discussed included the effect of unemployment on men in the aftermath of the world economic recession, the possibility of developing a male birth control pill, and attempts to increase care for men who had served in the U.S. military.

The 2018 International Conference on Men's Issues (ICMI18) was organized with Justice for Men and Boys. It was to have taken place at St Andrew's, the home of Birmingham City Football Club, UK, between July 6 and 8, 2018. However, in early November 2017 the club cancelled the intended use of their facilities, saying that they had been "misled at the time of booking". J4MB leader Buchanan had initially said he still intended for the conference to go ahead at St Andrew's as he felt he had "a perfectly good and legally binding contract". The conference was instead held at the ExCeL, London between July 20 and 22, 2018.

== Criticism ==
AVFM was included in a list of 12 websites in the spring 2012 issue ("The Year in Hate and Extremism") of the Southern Poverty Law Center's (SPLC) Intelligence Report in a section called "Misogyny: The Sites". The issue outlined the "manosphere", describing it as "hundreds of websites, blogs and forums dedicated to savaging feminists in particular and women...in general". The report credited some sites as making an attempt at civility and trying "to back their arguments with facts" but condemned almost all of them for being "thick with misogynistic attacks that can be astounding for the guttural hatred they express" and ultimately described them as "women-hating".

A prominent example used of AVFM allegedly inciting violence against women was the declaration of the month of October as "Bash A Violent Bitch Month", with Paul Elam stating, "A man hitting you back after you have assaulted him does not make you a victim of domestic violence. It makes you a recipient of justice. Deal with it."

Later that year, the SPLC published a statement about the reactions to their report, saying it "provoked a tremendous response among men's rights activists (MRAs) and their sympathizers", and that "[i]t should be mentioned that the SPLC did not label MRAs as members of a hate movement; nor did our article claim that the grievances they air on their websites – false rape accusations, ruinous divorce settlements and the like – are all without merit. But we did call out specific examples of misogyny and the threat, overt or implicit, of violence".

A 2014 statement by the SPLC criticized the International Conference on Men's Issues, particularly finding fault with the citations made that "40% to 50% of rape allegations are false" since the SPLC views that "the best scholarly studies show that between about 2% and 8% of such allegations are actually false— a rate that is comparable for false allegations of most other violent crimes." However, the organization's statement also argued that the AVFM-associated conference was "relatively subdued" given that most of those there worked to keep "vitriol to a minimum" in the discussions. A commentary on the nature of grief for men received praise from the SPLC, but the organization cautioned that the nature of prior material stated by those in AVFM was still a severe problem.

AVFM's rhetoric has been described as misogynistic and hateful by feminist commentators such as Leah McLaren, Jaclyn Friedman, Jill Filipovic, Brad Casey, Clementine Ford, and Mark Potok of the SPLC. Writing in The New York Times, Charles McGrath stated that websites like AVFM contain "a certain amount of anti-feminist hostility, if not outright misogyny". Time has reported on SPLC's "misogynist" description of the group as well as on the movement's official disavowing the concept of misogyny, with Elam cited as stating that being controversial was a way of drawing attention. Journalist Jessica Roy remarked that she found the AVFM conference divided between many individuals making violent threats and laughing openly at jokes about rape, and many individuals seeking to promote socioeconomic and legal changes by polite discussion.

In 2018, the SPLC categorized AVFM as a male supremacist hate group. However this categorization was removed from the SPLC hate list in 2022.
