= Herb Goldberg =

American psychologist and author (1937–2019)

- Born: Herbert Goldberg; July 14, 1937; Berlin, Germany
- Died: April 5, 2019 (aged 81)
- Occupations: Author, psychology professor
- Website: http://www.herbgoldbergphd.com

Herb Goldberg (July 14, 1937 – April 5, 2019) was a professor emeritus of psychology at California State University, Los Angeles and a practicing psychologist in Los Angeles.

He was the author of the book What Men Still Don't Know About Women, Relationships, and Love, previously authored The Hazards of Being Male: Surviving the Myth of Masculine Privilege (1975), related to the formative men's movement.

== Life and career ==
Goldberg was born on July 14, 1937, in Berlin, Germany, to Jacob and Ella (Nagler) Goldberg. He attended Bronx Science High School. In 1958 he got a B.A. from City College (now City College of the City University of New York), and in 1963 he received his Ph.D. from Adelphi University. In 1965 Goldberg became a professor of psychology at California State University, Los Angeles and retired in about July 2007.

Goldberg died on April 5, 2019, in Mount Washington, California, at the age of 81.

== His books ==
His newest book and his first in fifteen years, What Men Still Don't Know About Women, Relationships, and Love, synthesizes the major points that he wrote about in his seven previous books, as he explores contemporary issues that confront men in their relationships with women and family. While originally seen as an author of men's books, his writing has also become popular among women. His last two books, What Men Really Want and Men’s Secrets solidified a base of female readers that had previously embraced The Hazards of Being Male and The New Male-Female Relationship.

His first book, Creative Aggression, co-authored with Dr. George R. Bach, became a national best-seller and sold over one million copies. On September 20, 1981, the Los Angeles Times Book Review selected Creative Aggression for its list of “100 Books for the Modern Person,” a contemporary reading list of books published over the preceding 35-year period.

Goldberg then wrote The Hazards of Being Male: Surviving the Myth of Masculine Privilege, which aimed to explore men's personal experiences in response to the growing feminist movement. It had an initial printing of 7,500 copies, but eventually sold 20,000 hardcover copies. The Hazards of Being Male became a surprise best-seller and had a backlist with almost 30 printings and nearly one million copies sold.

Goldberg followed The Hazards of Being Male with the publication of The New Male, which sold over 300,000 copies.

At about the same time, Goldberg co-authored Money Madness. The paperback version was reprinted twice and was one of the first books to explore the relationship between people's financial habits and their personalities. It sold approximately 200,000 copies.

The New Male-Female Relationship created a new readership of women and was praised for being a balanced exploration of man-woman relationships. It sold approximately 250,000 copies.

The New Male-Female Relationship was followed by The Inner Male. This book advanced Goldberg's theory of polarized gender defenses. Total sales were in the vicinity of 200,000.

What Men Really Want (1991) was Goldberg's first book written for a female audience. What Men Really Want spawned a successful mini-book titled Men’s Secrets that was sold at chains such as Wal-Mart and K-Mart. It brought a new readership of women with blue collar backgrounds from the South and West, many of whom wrote letters to him about their relationship problems.

In 1991, Goldberg, a practicing clinician, university professor, and single parent, retreated from writing and traveling to concentrate on being a father, building a practice, and teaching at California State University, Los Angeles.

He now returns in writing to in order to address the critical relationship concerns for contemporary men and their female partners. In What Men Still Don’t Know About Women, Relationships and Love (Barricade, due out in June 2007), Goldberg writes on the many “I just don’t get it” aspects of men's experiences with women, providing illuminating case histories, concrete guidelines, and sound advice.

His most recent book is entitled "Overcoming Fears of Intimacy and Commitment: Relationship Insights for Men and the Women in Their Lives" which was published October 2016 by Rowman and Littlefield Inc. This book describes twelve dimensions of men's relationships. Each phase contains specific insights followed by a conversation, an explanation and a section for women and men separately.

== Bibliography ==
- Goldberg, Herb; Bach, George (1974). Creative aggression. Doubleday. ISBN 978-0-385-08746-9.
- Goldberg, Herb (1976). The hazards of being male: surviving the myth of masculine privilege. Nash Pub. ISBN 9780840213648.
- Goldberg, Herb; Lewis, Robert (1978). Money madne$$: the psychology of saving, spending, loving, and hating money. Morrow. ISBN 9780688032968.
- Goldberg, Herb (1979). The new male: from self-destruction to self-care. Morrow. ISBN 9780688035266.
- Goldberg, Herb (1983). The new male female relationship. Morrow.
- Goldberg, Herb (1987). The inner male: overcoming roadblocks to intimacy. New American Library. ISBN 9780453005609.
- Goldberg, Herb (1991). What men really want. Signet. ISBN 9780451169723.
- Goldberg, Herb (2007). What men still don't know about women, relationships, and love. Barricade Books.
- Goldberg, Herb (2016) Overcoming Fears of Intimacy and Commitment: Relationship Insights for Men and The Women In Their Lives. Rowman and Littlefield.
