= Pro-feminism =

Support for the cause of feminism

Pro-feminism refers to support of the cause of feminism without implying that the supporter is a member of the feminist movement. The term is most often used in reference to men ("male feminists") who actively support feminism and its efforts to bring about the political, economic, cultural, personal, and social equality of women with men. A number of pro-feminist men are involved in political activism, most often in the areas of gender equality, women's rights, and ending violence against women.

As feminist theory found support among a number of men who formed consciousness-raising groups in the 1960s, these groups were differentiated by preferences for particular feminisms and political approaches. However, the inclusion of men's voices as "feminist" presented issues for some. For a number of women and men, the word "feminism" was reserved for women, whom they viewed as the subjects who experienced the inequality and oppression that feminism sought to address. In response to this objection, various groups coined and defended other terms like antisexism and pro-feminism.

The activities of pro-feminist men's groups include anti-violence work with boys and with young men in schools, offering sexual-harassment workshops in workplaces, running community-education campaigns, and counseling male perpetrators of violence.

Pro-feminist men also are involved in men's health, men's studies, the development of gender-equity curricula in schools, and many other areas. Pro-feminist men who support anti-pornography feminists participate in activism against pornography including anti-pornography legislation. This work is sometimes in collaboration with feminists and women's services, such as domestic violence and rape crisis centers.

The term "pro-feminist" is also sometimes used by people who hold feminist beliefs or who advocate on behalf of feminist causes, but who do not consider themselves to be feminists per se. It is also used by those who do not identify with, or wish for others to identify them with, the feminist movement. Some activists do not refer to men as "feminists" at all, and will refer to all pro-feminist men as "pro-feminists", even if the men in question refer to themselves as "feminists". Others criticise "pro-feminist" men who refuse to identify as feminist. Most major feminist groups, most notably the National Organization for Women and the Feminist Majority Foundation, refer to male activists as "feminists" rather than as "pro-feminists".

== Pro-feminist men ==
Men responded in a variety of ways to first-wave feminism and to the societal changes in late 19th and early 20th century United States. For an example, see Thomas Wentworth Higginson, particularly his essay “Ought Women to learn the Alphabet?,” which appeared in the Atlantic Monthly (February, 1859).

Profeminist men embraced feminist ideas and actively advocated for equality between sexes. While antifeminists "articulated a nostalgic yearning for the pre-urban, pre-industrial traditional village, the profeminist position was articulated with a belief in modernity's liberatory potential". Essentially, through their belief in science and progress, profeminists believed that "suffrage was but a public expression of the feminist challenge to the social order that bound both women and men to repressive social conditions" and that in the long run it would be an immense gain for Americans of both genders.

Pro-feminist men are considered by some to be a stream of the modern men's movement sympathetic towards feminism. Pro-feminist men seek to add male voices to feminism and advocate change by both women as well as men in their gender relations and social, political, and institutional structures. Some feminists argue that male inclusion in the feminist movement is necessary for the universalization of the movement, and for the movement to remain relevant in the future. Since the latter half of the 20th century, more pro-feminists around the world have become involved in advocating for various causes typically associated with feminism, including but not limited to anti-rape and anti-violence activism, as well as challenging the sexualization of women in the media. Many of these activities have been chronicled in a variety of publications and books, including, since 1983, Voice Male magazine, edited by Rob Okun, himself a long-time pro-feminist.

Marge Piercy (1969) argued that liberal male politicians will sometimes espouse feminist claims to gain votes, despite dubious backgrounds and actions.

Pro-feminist men are often social activists like August Bebel.

=== Advocacy against violence against women ===
An area of feminist social work in which some pro-feminist men have participated is preventing violence against women, and supporting its survivors. Anti-violence activists work in shelters for battered women, counseling survivors, rehabilitating perpetrators and spreading awareness of the issue. Many male activists support these anti-violence campaigns on two strong fronts: first, that violence against women concerns all people, regardless of gender; and secondly, that more attention should be paid to the social environments that produce perpetrators. Activists have also analyzed the cultural factors that contribute to violence against women.

The White Ribbon Campaign was founded in response to the École Polytechnique Massacre in Montreal, Canada. The movement aims to spread awareness about the issue of violence against women by educating men about the problem.

=== Advocacy against rape ===
Although men's participation in anti-rape activism in American campaigns is still uncommon, some men have proved valuable allies in their positions in shelters, support groups, and rape response teams. Some male activists claim that their efforts are met with mistrust and anger. Much literature about male anti-rape activists involves men experiencing epiphanies about the emotional and psychological impact rape inflicts on its victims. Scholars typically claim that in order to end rape and violence against women, men must become aware of these issues, otherwise there is no hope for stopping rape.

In addition to the struggles men face as a part of their work with anti-rape activism, many men that choose to speak out against rape report social costs, specifically that they are viewed as ‘not masculine.’ Men's deviation from hegemonic masculinity, which is currently characterized by traits such as toughness, dominance, self-reliance, heterosexual behaviors, restriction of emotional expression and the avoidance of traditionally feminine attitudes and behaviors in European and American countries, can lead to exclusion by their male peers. Male activists claim that unless masculinity can be redefined to include both caring for women and being vulnerable to emotional issues such as rape, men will continue to avoid taking action against rape.

=== Advocacy against pornography ===
Some pro-feminist scholars believe that the portrayal of sexuality in pornography has contributed to the rise of sexual violence, misogyny, and the perpetuation of inequality between the sexes. They suggest that the normalization of male-dominated, violent, and degrading sexual acts has led users of pornography to incorporate violence into their own lives. Pro-feminists may assert that these trends in pornography are reflected by increased acts of sexual violence; and also contribute to normalizing rape culture. As with some areas of feminism, pro-feminists may also believe that pornography reduces women and teenage girls to sex objects.

== Core beliefs ==
As there is no centralised "movement" the motivation and goals of pro-feminist men are various. One profeminist website claims that among those motivations are:

- a sympathy for feminism revolving around a simple acceptance that men and women are equal and should thus be treated equally; that is, women should have the access to jobs and areas of public life as men do.
- a passionate and profound commitment that has changed every corner of their lives.
- "...a radical questioning of traditional Western models of thought, of the ways in which these privilege masculine ways of being and knowing."

Issues on which pro-feminists usually campaign include violence against women, sexism, inequalities in pay and promotion at work, sex trafficking, and women's rights to birth control. Pro-feminist men who support anti-pornography feminists also campaign against pornography.

They generally believe that:

- women suffer inequalities and injustices in society, while men receive various forms of power and privilege.
- the current, dominant model of manhood or masculinity is oppressive to women, as well as limiting for men themselves. Pro-feminists believe that men must take responsibility for their own behaviours and attitudes and work to change those of men in general.
- both personal and social change are vital.

Just as there is substantial diversity and disagreement within feminism, there is diversity among pro-feminist men. For example, the extent to which men are also limited or harmed by societal gender relations is an area of disagreement. Some men emphasise the privilege received by virtue of being men in a patriarchal or male-dominated society, while others emphasise the ways in which the gender roles laid down by patriarchal society constrict both men and women.

Some pro-feminist men argue that those who emphasize the latter, or who even claim that, like women, men too are "oppressed", are not really pro-feminist or are not pro-feminist enough. Others make a distinction between "radical pro-feminist" and "liberal pro-feminist" men, and emphasize their shared commitments and similarities.

Pro-feminist men typically also recognise the importance of other forms of injustice and other kinds of social relations. Pro-feminists assume that class, race, sexuality, age and other such things are important influences on the relations between and among men and women.

Pro-feminist men who are politically active have tended to concentrate on a number of specific issues, such as men's violence.

=== Early writings and assumptions ===
Early writings in the U.S. that the pro-feminist men's movement has identified as antecedents to its thought include Jon Snodgrass's A Book of Readings for Men against Sexism, Michael Kimmel and Michael Messner's collection of essays, Men's Lives, and Joseph Pleck's The Myth of Masculinity. Three basic assumptions of these early texts included the distinction between sex and gender, the treatment of gender as a social construct, and the position that men are harmed by proscriptive gender roles. Building on this last assumption, early pro-feminist men's texts assumed a corollary that if men were made aware of these conditions, they would relinquish their social privileges.

== Compared to feminism ==
Some feminists and pro-feminists believe that it is inappropriate for men to call themselves "feminists". There is also internal disagreement within this "movement", for example with socialist movements, anti-racist struggles, and so on. Those who claim that "feminist" can apply equally to men and women often point out that the arguments made by advocates of the term "pro-feminist" are based in notions of biological determinism and essentialism, and are actually contrary to feminist principles.

Some pro-feminist men believe that there is a potential for "backlash" within the men's movement, a potential for the movement to turn towards the defence of what they see as men's privilege and position, and some say that this has already occurred. While all pro-feminist men assume that men must act to dismantle gender injustice, some argue that a men's movement is not the way to do this.

== See also ==
- Men and feminism
- Gender role
- Masculinism
- Masculinity
- Matriarchy
- Philandry
- Misandry
- Philogyny
- Misogyny
- Patriarchy
- Sexism

=== Notable pro-feminist writers ===
- Kenneth Clatterbaugh
- Michael Flood
- Clive Hamilton
- Byron Hurt
- Robert Jensen
- Jackson Katz
- Michael Kimmel
- John Stuart Mill
- Michael Messner
- John Neal
- Rob Okun
- Jeremy Adam Smith
- John Stoltenberg

== General bibliography ==
- Brittan, Arthur, 1989, Masculinity and power, Oxford: Basil Blackwell
- Berkowitz, Alan D. (ed.). Men and rape: theory, research, and prevention programs in higher education, issue 65 of New directions for student services, Jossey-Bass, 1994, ISBN 978-0-7879-9971-1.
- Clatterbaugh, Kenneth, 1990, Contemporary perspectives on masculinity: men, women, and politics in modern society, Colorado & Oxford: Westview Press
- Connell, R.W., 1987, Gender and power: society, the person and sexual politics, Sydney: Allen & Unwin
- Connell, R.W., 1995, Masculinities, Sydney: Allen & Unwin
- Cooper, Mick, and Baker, Peter, 1996, The MANual: the complete man's guide to life, London: Thorsons
- Digby, Tom (ed.), 1998, Men Doing Feminism, New York: Routledge
- Edley, Nigel, and Wetherell, Margaret, 1995, Men in perspective: practice, power and identity, London: Prentice-Hall
- Edwards, Tim, 1993, Erotics and politics: gay male sexuality, masculinity, and feminism, New York: Routledge
- Haddad, Tony (ed.), 1993, Men and masculinities: a critical anthology, Toronto: Canadian Scholars' Press
- Kaufman, Michael (ed), 1987, Beyond patriarchy: essays by men on pleasure, power and change, New York: Oxford University Press
- Kaufman, Michael, 1993, Cracking the armour: power, pain and tstview Press
- Kimmel, Michael, and Messner, Michael (eds), 1992, Men's lives, New York/Toronto: Macmillan/Maxwell (2nd edition)
- Mac an Ghaill, Mairtin (ed), 1996, Understanding masculinities: Social relations and cultural arenas, Buckingham & Philadelphia: Open University Press
- May, Larry, and Robert Strikwerda (eds), 1992, Rethinking masculinity: philosophical explorations in light of feminism, Maryland: Rowman & Littlefield
- McLean, Chris, Carey, Maggie, and White, Cheryl (eds), 1996, Men's ways of being, Boulder, Colorado: Westview Press
- Segal, Lynne, 1990, Slow motion: changing masculinities, changing men, London: Virago
- Segal, Lynne, 1990, Slow motion: changing masculinities, changing men, London: Virago pro-feminist men respond to the mythopoetic men's movement (and the mythopoetic leaders answer), Philadelphia: Temple University Press
- Smith, Jeremy Adam. 2009. The Daddy Shift: How Stay-at-Home Dads, Breadwinning Moms, and Shared Parenting are Transforming the American Family. Boston: Beacon Press.
- Snodgrass, Jon (ed), 1977, A book of readings: for men against sexism, Albion CA: Times Change Press
- Stoltenberg, John, 1990, Refusing to be a man: essays on sex and justice, CA & Suffolk: Fontana/Collins
- Stoltenberg, John 1998 The end of manhood: a book for men of conscience, New York: Dutton
- Tarrant, Shira. 2009. Men and Feminism. Berkeley: Seal Press.
- Tarrant, Shira (ed). 2008. Men Speak Out: Views on Gender, Sex and Power. New York: Routledge.
