= Men's liberation movement =

Social movement

The men's liberation movement is a social movement that posits that men suffer from unjust societal restraints and aims to free them from such restraints. Men's liberation activists are generally sympathetic to feminist standpoints.

The men's liberation movement is not to be confused with different movements such as the men's rights movement. The men's liberation movement stresses the negative aspects of "traditional" masculinity; for example, it aims to liberate men from stereotypes and attitudes that prevent them from expressing their emotions in a healthy manner. On the other hand, the men's rights movement is largely about perceived unequal or unfair treatment of men by modern institutions because of, or in spite of, those traits ubiquitous to traditional masculinity.

== History ==
The men's liberation movement, as recognized by feminists and gender scholars, developed mostly among heterosexual, middle-class men in Britain and North America as a response to the cultural changes of the 1960s and 1970s, including the growth of the feminist movement, counterculture, women's and gay liberation movements, and the sexual revolution. Jack Sawyer published an article titled "On Male Liberation" in Liberation journal in the autumn of 1970, in which he discussed the negative effects of stereotypes of male sex roles. The year 1971 saw the birth of men's discussion groups across the United States, as well as the formation by Warren Farrell of the National Task Force on the Masculine Mystique within the National Organization for Women. Robert Lewis and Joseph Pleck sourced the birth of the movement to the publication of five books on the subject in late 1974 and early 1975, which was followed by a surge of publications targeted to both lay and more academic audiences.

The movement led to the formation of conferences, consciousness raising groups, men's centers, and other resources across the United States. The male liberation movement as a single self-conscious liberal feminist movement dissolved during the late 1970s. By the early 1980s, members of the male liberation movement had fully split into two entities. The members who had placed greater emphasis on the 'cost of male gender roles to men' than the 'cost of male gender roles to women' had formed the men's rights movement focusing on issues faced by men. The members who saw sexism exclusively as a system of men oppressing women rejected the language of sex roles and created pro-feminist men's organizations focused primarily on addressing sexual violence against women.

== Race ==
Racial differences have existed within the men's liberation movement which, despite its best efforts of inclusion, such divisions have on occasion been problematic. Some feminist scholars in political opposition to the movement have argued that racism within American society has emasculated non-white men. For example, black men are perceived to lack control over their innate sexual aggression. Within this ideological framework black men are presented as hyper-sexual to an animalistic degree and are compared to animals, predators and beasts because of this. East Asian Americans, however, have been portrayed as unattractive and less masculine.

== Gay liberation ==
Second-wave pro-feminism paid increased attention to issues of sexuality, particularly the relationship between homosexual men and hegemonic masculinity. This shift led to more cooperation between the men's liberation and gay liberation movements. In part this cooperation arose because masculinity was then understood to be a social construction, and as a response to the universalization of "men" seen in previous men's movements.

== Organizations ==
=== California Men's Gatherings ===
The California Men's Gatherings (CMG) was created in 1978 by men in the anti-sexist men's movement. Author Margo Adair, who attended the twelfth gathering in 1987, wrote that she found the atmosphere strangely different than anything she had previously experienced. After thinking about it, she realized it was the first time she had ever felt completely safe among a large group of men, with few other women. She also noticed that everyone was accepted, and affection among participants was displayed openly.

CMG organizes three retreats annually, focused on men's issues. Currently, most of the men attending California Men's Gatherings are gay or bisexual.

=== r/MensLib ===
MensLib is an online forum on the social media site Reddit. It is a pro-feminist community and was created as a healthy and safe space for discussion on how traditional gender roles and masculinity hurts men.

=== National Organization for Men Against Sexism ===
The National Organization for Men Against Sexism (NOMAS) is a pro-feminist, gay affirmative men's organization which also enhances men's lives that began in the 1970s. The 1991 NOMAS national conference was about building multicultural communities.

=== Radical Faeries ===
The Radical Faeries were organized in California in 1979 by gay activists wanting to create an alternative to being assimilated into mainstream men's culture.

== Activities ==
- College men's centers
- Men's support groups
- Public advocacy and law reform

== See also ==
- Affirmative action
- Discrimination against men
- Gay rights
- Gender differences in suicide
- Gender empowerment
- Gender and emotional expression
- Gender essentialism
- Gender polarization
- Gender policing
  - Effeminacy
- Gender roles
  - Gender variance
  - Social construction of gender
- Homophobia
  - Discrimination against gay men
  - Heterosexism
- Intersex
- Machismo
  - Sissy (pejorative)
- Manosphere
- Masculism
  - Men's health
- Men and feminism
- Men's studies
- Men Going Their Own Way
- Misandry
- Patriarchy
- Postgenderism
- Radical Faeries
- Sex and gender distinction
- Transgender men
  - Transmisandry
- Violence against men
  - Rape of males
    - Corrective rape
  - Violence against gay men
