= Masculism =

Advocacy for the rights and interests of males

Masculism or masculinism (Note: Some scholars treat the term masculinism as interchangeable with masculism, while others treat it as a subset or variation on it or as a separate topic.) is the promotion of masculine ideals. The terms masculism and masculinism may also refer to the men's rights movement or men's movement, (Note: Melissa Blais and Francis Dupuis-Déri write: "In English, they [masculinist and masculinism] generally designate either a way of thinking whose referent is the masculine or simply a patriarchal ideology (Watson, 1996), rather than a component of the antifeminist social movement. In English, 'men's movement' is the most common term, though some, like Warren Farrell, use 'masculist' or the more restrictive 'fathers' rights movement'.") as well as antifeminism or machismo.

== Terminology ==
=== Early history ===
According to the historian Judith Allen, Charlotte Perkins Gilman invented the term masculism in 1914, when she gave a public lecture series in New York entitled "Studies in Masculism". Allen writes that Gilman used masculism to refer to the opposition of misogynist men to women's rights and, more broadly, to describe "men's collective political and cultural actions on behalf of their own sex", or what Allen calls the "sexual politics of androcentric cultural discourses". Gilman referred to men and women who opposed women's suffrage as masculists—women who collaborated with these men were "Women Who Won't Move Forward"—and described World War I as "masculism at its worst".

=== Definition and scope ===
A Dictionary of Media and Communication (2011) defines masculinism (or masculism) as "[a] male counterpart to feminism. [...] Like feminism, masculism reflects a number of positions, from the desire for equal rights for men (for example, in cases of child access after divorce), to more militant calls for the total abolition of women's rights." According to Susan Whitlow in The Encyclopedia of Literary and Cultural Theory (2011), the terms are "used interchangeably across disciplines". Sociologist Robert Menzies wrote in 2007 that both terms are common in men's rights and anti-feminist literature: "The intrepid virtual adventurer who boldly goes into these unabashedly mascul(in)ist spaces is quickly rewarded with a torrent of diatribes, invectives, atrocity tales, claims to entitlement, calls to arms, and prescriptions for change in the service of men, children, families, God, the past, the future, the nation, the planet, and all other things non-feminist."

The gender-studies scholar Julia Wood describes masculinism as an ideology asserting that women and men should have different roles and rights owing to fundamental differences between them, and that men suffer from discrimination and "need to reclaim their rightful status as men". Sociologists Arthur Brittan and Satoshi Ikeda describe masculinism as an ideology justifying male domination in society. (Note: Brittan calls masculinism "the ideology that justifies and naturalizes male domination [...] the ideology of patriarchy".) Masculinism, according to Brittan, maintains that there is "a fundamental difference" between men and women and rejects feminist arguments that male–female relationships are political constructs.

The political scientist Georgia Duerst-Lahti distinguishes between masculism, which expresses the ethos of the early gender-egalitarian men's movement, and masculinism, which refers to the ideology of patriarchy. Sociologists Melissa Blais and Francis Dupuis-Déri describe masculism as a form of antifeminism; they equate masculist and masculinist, attributing the former to author Warren Farrell. The most common term, they argue, is the "men's movement"; they write that there is a growing consensus in the French-language media that the movement should be referred to as masculiniste. Dupuis-Déri writes that members of the men's movement refer to themselves as both masculinist and masculist. According to Whitlow, masculinist theory such as Farrell's and that of gender-studies scholar R.W. Connell developed alongside third-wave feminism and queer theory, and was influenced by those theories' questioning of traditional gender roles and the meaning of terms such as man and woman.

Ferrel Christensen, a Canadian philosopher and president of the former Alberta-based Movement for the Establishment of Real Gender Equality, writes that "Defining 'masculism' is made difficult by the fact that the term has been used by very few people, and by hardly any philosophers." He differentiates between "progressive masculists", who welcome many of the societal changes promoted by feminists, while believing that some measures to reduce sexism against women have increased it against men, and an "extremist version" of masculism that promotes male supremacy. He argued that if masculism and feminism refer to the belief that men/women are systematically discriminated against, and that this discrimination should be eliminated, there is not necessarily a conflict between feminism and masculism, and some assert that they are both. However, many believe that one sex is more discriminated against, and thus use one label and reject the other.

According to Bethany M. Coston and Michael Kimmel, members of the mythopoetic men's movement identify as masculinist. Nicholas Davidson, in The Failure of Feminism (1988), calls masculism "virism": "Where the feminist perspective is that social ills are caused by the dominance of masculine values, the virist perspective is that they are caused by a decline of those values." Christensen calls virism "an extreme brand of masculism and masculinism".

Sociologist Andreas Kemper describes masculism as a variation of masculinism whose goal is to oppose what its adherents see as female domination, making it fundamentally anti-feminist.

== Areas of interest ==
=== Education and employment ===
Many masculists oppose co-educational schooling, believing that single-sex schools better promote the well-being of boys.

=== Violence and suicide ===
Masculists cite higher rates of suicide in men than women. Farrell expresses concern about violence against men being depicted as humorous, in the media and elsewhere.

They also express concern about violence against men being ignored or minimized in comparison to violence against women, asserting gender symmetry in domestic violence. Another of Farrell's concerns is that traditional assumptions of female innocence or sympathy for women, termed benevolent sexism, do lead to unequal penalties for women and men who commit similar crimes, to lack of sympathy for male victims in domestic violence cases when the perpetrator is female, and to dismissal of female-on-male sexual assault and sexual harassment cases.

=== Gender studies ===
A masculist approach to gender studies, which have frequently focused on woman-based or feminist approaches, examines oppression within a masculinist, patriarchal society from a male standpoint. According to A Dictionary of Media and Communication (2011), "Masculists reject the idea of universal patriarchy, arguing that before feminism most men were as disempowered as most women. However, in the post-feminist era they argue that men are in a worse position because of the emphasis on women's rights."

== South African masculinist evangelical movements ==
In the wake of the abolition of apartheid, South Africa saw a resurgence of masculinist Christian evangelical groups, led by the Mighty Men Conference (MMC) and the complementary Worthy Women Conference (WWC). The latter saw the development of what theologian Sarojini Nadar and psychologist Cheryl Potgeier call formenism: "Formenism, like masculinism, subscribes to a belief in the inherent superiority of men over women (in other words, only men can be leaders), but unlike masculinism, it is not an ideology developed and sustained by men, but one constructed, endorsed and sustained by women" [emphasis in original]. The Mighty Men movement harkens back to the Victorian idea of Muscular Christianity. Feminist scholars argue that the movement's lack of attention to women's rights and the struggle for racial equality makes it a threat to women and to the stability of the country. Scholar Miranda Pillay argues that the Mighty Men movement's appeal lies in its resistance to gender equality as incompatible with Christian values, and in raising patriarchy to a "hyper-normative status", beyond challenge by other claims to power.

The Worthy Women Conference is an auxiliary to the MMC in advocating a belief in the inherent superiority of men over women. Its leader, Gretha Wiid, blames South Africa's disorder on the liberation of women, and aims to restore the nation through its families, making women again subservient to men. Her success is attributed to her balancing claims that God created the gender hierarchy, but that women are no less valuable than men, and that restoration of traditional gender roles relieves existential anxiety in post-apartheid South Africa.

== See also ==
- Identity politics
- Men's liberation
- Men's movement
- Men's studies

Men's organizations

- International Men's Day (19 November)
- Save Indian Family

UK:

- Fathers 4 Justice

Canada:

- Canadian Association for Equality

France:

- SOS Papa

Notable people associated with masculism

- Robert E. Bly
- Warren Farrell
- Esther Vilar
- David Benatar
