= Asa Baber =

American writer

- Born: June 19, 1936; Chicago, Illinois
- Died: June 16, 2003 (aged 66); Chicago, Illinois
- Other name: "Ace"
- Occupations: Writer, columnist
- Writing career
- Period: 20th century
- Notable works: Land of a Million Elephants, "Men"

Asa Baber (June 19, 1936 – June 16, 2003) was an American author, Marine Corps Captain, and columnist for Playboy magazine.

Growing up on the South Side of Chicago, Baber was involved in several incidents of petty mischief before his grandmother arranged for him to attend the Lawrenceville Academy, a prestigious boarding school in New Jersey. Baber went on to Princeton University where he joined the United States Marine Corps Platoon Leaders Class. After graduation in 1958, he was commissioned as an officer in the Marine Corps and served until 1961, achieving the rank of Captain. He participated in several covert actions in Laos. His military experience became material for several essays and, finally, his first book, Land of a Million Elephants, published in 1971, and serialized in Playboy. Baber performed his graduate work at Northwestern University and the University of Iowa's Writer's Workshop.

From 1969 through 1975 Baber was a professor of English at the University of Hawaiʻi. He was so beloved that, when the Chicago Sun-Times published an article about him in 2002 (focusing largely on his failing health), dozens of former students wrote to him to re-establish contact and offer support.

In 1978, Baber wrote an essay called, "Who Gets Screwed In A Divorce? I Do!" which was published in Playboy. The essay was so popular that Baber joined with longtime Playboy editor Arthur Ketchmer to develop a column called "Men", that became a celebrated cornerstone of Men's liberation. Quickly becoming one of the magazine's most popular features, the unapologetic and politically incorrect column covered a broad spectrum of subjects including sports, sexuality, divorce, male-bashing, employment, personal identity, fatherhood, and personal values.

He was a pioneer in saying there were men's issues, and he also told men not to hide from their issues... [it] helped a lot of guys deal with things that men think of as weaknesses: depression, the pain of divorce, the pain of unemployment, the pain of rejection.

— Playboy editor Arthur Kretchmer

"Women who worked at the magazine hated the column or were embarrassed by the notion that a man would stick up for men, would go out of his way to say that men had character, men had virtues, men had their own sets of needs and that men were also asked to make sacrifices by the culture that they lived in that were minimized by the women's movement: going to a job every day, serving in the military."

— Arthur Kretchmer

In September 2001, Baber was diagnosed with amyotrophic lateral sclerosis (ALS), also known as Lou Gehrig's disease. (Coincidentally, Baber shared a birthday with his hero, Lou Gehrig.) Upon making an announcement on the 2002 Jerry Lewis MDA Telethon, Baber was elected to serve as national president of the Muscular Dystrophy Association, a post he held until his death. His final column, published the month of his death, retained his gritty style and displayed the quintessentially masculine courage with which he faced his disease.

I am here to urge you to be a little more brave, a tad more courageous and self-controlled, and to take some private time to contemplate the mysteries of the universe and ask yourself how you plan to spend whatever time you have left.

— Asa Baber - from the final "Men" column - June, 2003
