= Michael Flood =

Australian sociologist

- Born: Michael G. Flood; Australia

Academic background
- Education: Australian National University
- Thesis: Lust, trust and latex: why young heterosexual men don't use condoms (2000)

Academic work
- Main interests: Sociology; Gender studies
- Website: http://staff.qut.edu.au/staff/floodm/

Michael G. Flood is an Australian sociologist and a professor at the Queensland University of Technology School of Justice. Flood gained his doctorate in gender and sexuality studies from the Australian National University. His areas of research are on violence against women, fathering, pro-feminism, domestic violence, the effects of pornography on young people, safe sex among heterosexual men, men's movements as a backlash to the feminist movement, men's relationships with each other and with women, homophobia, men's health, and gender justice. He is a regular contributor to and is regularly quoted in the media on these and other issues.

Flood is a co-editor of the International Encyclopedia of Men and Masculinities, and the author of numerous academic papers on issues related to men and gender. Flood has also worked as a pro-feminist educator and activist, addressing men's violence against women. He coordinates, edits and contributes to XY, a pro-feminist website providing a range of commentary and research on men and masculinities, male sexuality, feminism, the men's movement and male violence from a feminist perspective. He also coordinates The Men's Bibliography, an online collection of over 22,000 works on men, masculinities, and gender.

== Selected bibliography ==
=== Books ===
- Flood, Michael (2000). Lust, trust and latex: why young heterosexual men don't use condoms (Ph.D. thesis). Australian National University. OCLC 56730906.
- Flood, Michael; et al. (2007). International encyclopedia of men and masculinities. London New York: Routledge. ISBN 9780415333436. ISBN 9780415333436
- Flood, Michael; Howson, Richard (2015). Engaging men in building gender equality. Newcastle upon Tyne: Cambridge Scholars Publishing. ISBN 9781443872485.
- Flood, Michael (2018). Engaging Men and Boys in Violence Prevention. New York: Palgrave Macmillan. ISBN 9781137442109.

=== Book chapters ===
- Flood, Michael (2004), "Backlash: angry men's movements", in Rossi, Stacey Elin (ed.), The battle and backlash rage on: why feminism cannot be obsolete, Philadelphia, Pennsylvania: Xlibris, pp. 261–278. ISBN 9781413459340
- Flood, Michael (2005), "Men's collective struggles for gender justice: the case of anti-violence activism" (PDF), in Kimmel, Michael S.; Hearn, Jeff; Connell, Raewyn (eds.), Handbook of studies on men & masculinities, Thousand Oaks, California: SAGE Publications, pp. 458–466. ISBN 9780761923695 Pdf.
- Flood, Michael (2008), "Bent straights: diversity and flux among heterosexual men", in Oleksy, E. H. (ed.), Intimate citizenships: gender, sexualities, politics (PDF), London: Routledge, pp. 223–240. ISBN 9780415990769 Preview.
- Flood, Michael; Pease, Robert; Taylor, Natalie; Webster, Kim (2009), "Reshaping attitudes towards violence against women", in Buzawa, Eve S.; Stark, Evan (eds.), Violence against women in families and relationships, Volume IV: the media and cultural attitudes, Santa Barbara, California: Praeger/ABC-CLIO, p. 184, ISBN 9780275998547. Details.
- Flood, Michael (2010), "Young men using pornography", in Boyle, Karen (ed.), Everyday pornography (PDF), London, New York: Routledge, pp. 164–178, archived from the original (PDF) on 20 October 2016. ISBN 9780415543781 Preview.
- Flood, Michael (2015), "Current practices to preventing sexual and intimate partner violence", in Johnson, Holly; Fisher, Bonnie S.; Jaquier, Véronique (eds.), Critical issues on violence against women: international perspectives and promising strategies, London: Routledge, pp. 209–220, ISBN 9781135006037.
- Flood, Michael (2015). "Men and gender equality". In Flood, Michael; Howson, Richard (eds.). Engaging men in building gender equality (PDF). Newcastle upon Tyne: Cambridge Scholars Publishing. ISBN 9781443872485

=== Journal articles ===
- Flood, Michael (Summer 1999). "Claims about 'husband battering'". DVIRC Newsletter. Domestic Violence and Incest Resource Centre, Melbourne: 3–8. Pdf.
- Flood, Michael (January 2003). "Lust, trust and latex: why young heterosexual men do not use condoms" (PDF). Culture, Health & Sexuality. 5 (4): 353–369. doi:10.1080/1369105011000028273. S2CID 37928894.
- Flood, Michael; Pease, Bob (2005). "Undoing men's privilege and advancing gender equality in public sector institutions" (PDF). Policy and Society. 24 (4): 119–138. doi:10.1016/s1449-4035(05)70123-5. hdl:10536/DRO/DU:30009028. S2CID 144858631. Pdf.
- Flood, Michael (Summer 2006). "Violence against women and men in Australia: What the Personal Safety Survey can and can't tell us about domestic violence". DVIRC Quarterly. 4. Domestic Violence and Incest Resource Centre, Melbourne: 3–10. Pdf.
- Flood, Michael (March 2007). "Exposure to pornography among youth in Australia" (PDF). Journal of Sociology. 43 (1): 45–60. doi:10.1177/1440783307073934. hdl:1885/35758. S2CID 144510840. Pdf.
- Flood, Michael (Winter 2007). "Involving men in gender practice and policy" (PDF). Critical Half: Bi-Annual Journal of Women for Women International. 5 (1). Women for Women International: 9–14.
- Flood, Michael (April 2008). "Men, sex, and homosociality how bonds between men shape their sexual relations with women" (PDF). Men and Masculinities. 10 (3): 339–359. doi:10.1177/1097184X06287761. S2CID 145135916. Pdf.
- Flood, Michael; Pease, Bob (April 2009). "Factors influencing attitudes to violence against women" (PDF). Trauma, Violence, & Abuse. 10 (2): 125–142. doi:10.1177/1524838009334131. PMID 19383630. S2CID 11494907.
- Flood, Michael (November 2009). "The harms of pornography exposure among children and young people" (PDF). Child Abuse Review. 18 (6): 384–400. doi:10.1002/car.1092.
- Flood, Michael (March 2010). ""Fathers' rights" and the defense of paternal authority in Australia" (PDF). Violence Against Women. 16 (3): 328–347. doi:10.1177/1077801209360918. PMID 20133921. S2CID 206667283. Pdf.
- Flood, Michael (June 2011). "Men as students and teachers of feminist scholarship" (PDF). Men and Masculinities. 14 (2): 135–154. doi:10.1177/1097184X11407042. S2CID 145450198. Pdf.
- Flood, Michael (August 2011). "Involving men in efforts to end violence against women" (PDF). Men and Masculinities. 14 (3): 358–377. doi:10.1177/1097184X10363995. S2CID 2474589. Pdf.
- Flood, Michael (May 2011). "Building men's commitment to ending sexual violence against women" (PDF). Feminism & Psychology. 21 (2): 262–267. doi:10.1177/0959353510397646. S2CID 71528539.
- Flood, Michael (December 2012). "Separated fathers and the 'fathers' rights' movement". Journal of Family Studies. 18 (2–3): 235–345. doi:10.5172/jfs.2012.18.2-3.235. S2CID 55469150. Pdf.
- Flood, Michael; Jewkes, Rachel; Lang, James (18 April 2015). "From work with men and boys to changes of social norms and reduction of inequities in gender relations: a conceptual shift in prevention of violence against women and girls" (PDF). The Lancet. 385 (9977): 1580–1589. doi:10.1016/S0140-6736(14)61683-4. PMID 25467578. S2CID 18597874. Pdf.
