= Discrimination against men =

Discrimination against men refers to gender-based inequality, bias, or disadvantage affecting men or boys, as well as disproportionately adverse outcomes.

Such discrimination has been observed in various areas, for example in the health and education sectors. In the legal system, men on average receive higher rates of incarceration and longer sentences than women for similar crimes. Research on sexism against men has been limited, and the topic is little discussed due to cultural biases.

== Terminology ==
Discrimination against men is sometimes called reverse sexism. Philosopher David Benatar uses the term "second sexism".

== Societal attitudes ==
Researchers Alice Eagly and Antonio Mladinik introduced the women-are-wonderful effect in 1994 after they found that both men and women tend to attribute positive traits to women, with women showing a much more pronounced bias. Positive traits were attributed to men by both sexes too, but to a much lesser extent. They found this trend in their 1989 and 1991 studies, which used questionnaires distributed to students in the United States.

In an online survey conducted by Ipsos between 2022 and 2023, 48% of people believed that the promotion of women's rights has gone as far as discriminating against men. Conservative commentators sometimes claim there is a "war" on men and boys. Richard V. Reeves, author of the book Of Boys and Men, writes that a third of American men believe that they are discriminated against, and that South Korean men in their twenties are twice as likely to believe that discrimination against men is more severe than discrimination against women. According to Reeves, this is false, and men's problems are the result of broader societal shifts, not deliberate discrimination.

== Workforce ==
There is limited research about discrimination against men in the workplace, and the OECD often does not consider men when measuring gender equality. Eurofound's European Working Conditions Survey (EWCS) in 2015 showed that 1% of men and 3.1% of women had perceived discrimination in the past 12 months. Discrimination against men in regards to hiring typically happens in occupations which have the gender role of being feminine. One study found that discrimination against men in female-dominated workplaces is more prevalent than discrimination against women in male-dominated workplaces. Employers may consider that men taking time off means that they are not committed to their job, whereas women taking time off is considered normal. Discrimination can also take the form of stricter dress codes for men.

For a long time in the United States, the idea of discrimination against men was perceived by lawyers and judges as laughable. However, through the efforts of the lawyer Ruth Bader Ginsburg, the anti-stereotyping theory was developed. According to this theory, sex stereotyping, which is often experienced by both men and women in the workplace, can be considered sex-based discrimination. This approach has become the norm in US judicial practice after a landmark decision Price Waterhouse v. Hopkins. And the decision in Oncale v. Sundowner Offshore Services, Inc. has determined that it can also be considered sex-based discrimination when people discriminate against people of the same sex. The feminist movement has made a major contribution to the promotion of the anti-stereotyping principle.

In 2006 researchers of the English labour market sent out CVs with equal qualifications, ages and experience and concluded that the feminine gender role job of secretaries discriminated against men with hiring, but the study also found "mixed occupations" with discrimination against men: trainee chartered accountants and computer analyst programmers. Some believe that this may be due to affirmative action.

According to the Observatory of Inequalities, in France men are put under more pressure in work, expected to work long hours and full time and have higher rates of accidents, which was described as reverse sexism.

In a study published in 2019, researchers looked at gender discrimination in 134 countries, and claimed that in 91 (68%) of those countries, men were more disadvantaged than women. They argued that the Global Gender Gap measure was flawed as weightings often did not include situations where men are disadvantaged, and due to a low level of research about men. They based their claim about more men being disadvantaged due to levels that disproportionately affect men and boys, such as receiving harsher punishments than the same crimes of women, over-representation in the homeless and prison population, compulsory military service (both in the present and living history), higher levels of suicide, higher levels of drug and alcohol abuse, more occupational deaths, under-performance in education, being over-represented in dangerous jobs, and experiencing higher rates of physical assault.

Men are often sanctioned in the form of condemnation and ridicule for their interest in traditionally feminine professions. Writing in Frontiers in Psychology, psychologist Francesca Manzi points out that in such cases, discrimination against men is often not recognised, which may be due to traditional gender attitudes that prohibit men from traditionally feminine behaviour.

A meta-study published in 2023 in the Organizational Behavior and Human Decision Processes journal looking at 361,645 job applications from 1976 to 2020 concluded that selection bias against male candidates in female‐typed jobs had been stable, saying that "selection bias in favor of male over female candidates was eliminated and, if anything, slightly reversed in sign starting in 2009 for mixed-gender and male-stereotypical jobs". The study also asked both laypeople and scientists to forecast gender bias, who did not predict that discrimination against male candidates would be stable, and overestimated bias against female candidates.

=== Nursing ===
Discrimination against men has been described in the healthcare sector due to gender stereotypes and prejudice. In a study of male nurses educators, discrimination was described as a common practice. It included rejection from patients, rejection to support career prospects from hospital management, and having to pay their own expenses during education where female students received stipends. Negative experiences of male nurses included rejection, discrimination, accusations from patients and families; harassment and lack of support from female colleagues, managers, and educators.

After the "feminization of nursing" in the 19th century, it became socially inappropriate for males to provide intimate care for female patients, such as inserting a catheter. It was also theorised that men were not fit for nursing because the rough hands of men were "not fitted to touch, bathe and dress wounded limbs". Some people view that male nurses do not conform to the traditional gender stereotyped role that women are the caretakers, and many consider nursing to be a women-only profession.

In 2006, a male nurse won a discriminatory case against the National Health Service which refused to let him perform procedures on women without a female chaperone. Female nurses did not have this rule.

=== Teachers ===
Compared to identical women, male elementary school teachers are perceived as having a greater safety threat to children, less likeable and less hireable.

A 2016 survey on the education workplace in Denmark found that 64% of men compared to 39% of women had rules to stop them from sexually assaulting the children, the most common being closing doors while changing nappies. It also found that 10% of men compared to 3% of women were not allowed to be with the children alone and 17% of men reported that there were rules for men only in their workplace. 35% of men and 24% of women had rules constraining physical contact with children, such as kissing and hugging. The survey also reported that 50% of men compared to 15% of women restrained from doing certain activities with children in fear of suspicion of inappropriate conduct. This included not having a baby on their lap, not changing nappies and not kissing a child.

=== Quotaism ===
In 2021, the Crime and Corruption Commission of Queensland, Australia, said that due to the Police's strategy on 50/50 recruitment, 200 male candidates were discriminated against. They said that women ineligible for the applied position were selected over men who were eligible.

During 2013, the New Zealand Labour Party proposed banning men from candidate selections to reach 50% women in parliament. It was later scrapped after criticism that it was undemocratic.

== Education ==
Historically men received more education than women, but since 1990s men are underrepresented among tertiary education students in almost all countries.

A study looking at children born in the 1980s in the United States until their adulthood found that boys with behavioural problems were less likely to complete high school and university than girls with the same behavioural problems. Boys had more exposure to negative experiences and peer pressure, and had higher rates of grade repetition. Owens, who conducted the study, attributes this to negative stereotypes about boys and says that this may partially explain the gender gap in education.

People are also less likely to assist males falling behind in grades than females.

=== Grading bias ===
Multiple studies have shown grading bias against boys, regardless of the examiner's sex. In these studies, examiners were provided no information about the students apart from their name. This includes a 2004 study in Israel where 9 subjects; in the arts, sciences and mathematics were tested. A 2020 study of junior high schools in Sweden conducted a similar study, estimating a bias against boys of 23% of a standard deviation. Biases have also been found in Portuguese and French high schools, and a study of 15-year-olds in Czechia, and in Italy. According to a global report performed by the OECD of over 60 countries, girls were given higher marks in comparison to boys with the same ability.

A study looking at the perceptions of students by their teachers found that teachers perceive girls as having higher "Persistence, Mood, and [educational competence]" and boys having higher levels of "Activity, Distractibility, Inhibition, and Negative Emotionality".

=== Punishment ===
Due to gendered behavioural norms which many schools enforce, boys receive on average higher rates of suspension, expulsion and retention than girls with the same behaviours. This begins in preschool.

=== Scholarships ===
In many universities there are scholarships for women only, often known as women's scholarships. These have been described as illegal under Title IX and discriminatory against men, causing the United States Department of Education to launch multiple investigations around the country.

In a study of 220 universities in the United States, 84% of them offered single-gender scholarships. The study described the universities as discriminatory if there are 4 or more women-only scholarships compared to men-only, and described 68.5% of the universities as discriminatory against men. People pushing to get these removed have mentioned that these scholarships were created in the 1970s when women were under-represented in tertiary education, but it is now men who under-perform and that the scholarships should become gender-neutral.

In 2008 the Human Rights Commission of New Zealand considered abolishing women's scholarships.

== Pension ==
In 2022 the European Court of Human Rights found that the Swiss government discriminates against men, because women whose husbands die receive a pension for the rest of their lives whereas men only receive a pension if they have children under the age of 18.

In Cyprus, men cannot receive the pension of a dead person, but women can.

Some countries require for pension benefit calculation the application of unisex annuity tables despite sex differences in life expectancy, which results in redistribution from men to women.

=== Retirement age ===
The retirement age in many countries is lower for women than for men. For instance in Poland, Georgia, and Argentina the retirement age for women is 60 years, but 65 years for men. This has been criticised because generally women have a higher life expectancy and because, even if the retirement age was equal, men have less time in retirement. This included Switzerland where the retirement age for men was 65 whereas the retirement age was 64 for women. The retirement age for women increased to 65 in 2022. In a few countries however, the effective age of labour market exit for men is lower than for women, such as Spain, Finland and France.

Between 1940 and 1991 in the United Kingdom, the pension age was different for men and women. It was 65 for men and 60 for women, although this has now changed. This also had an effect on bus free passes where women previously could get them at a younger age than men.

== Incarceration and sentencing ==
In the United Kingdom, United States, and France, women who commit crimes are less likely to be arrested, and sent to court than men. Males arrested for murder are six times more likely to face the death penalty than females arrested for murder. Many scholars have suggested that this is due to chivalric beliefs.

A study in France of sentences between 2000 and 2003 found that women who committed comparable offences to men received prison sentences that were 33% shorter. The study suggested that the gender gap is caused by the gender of the judge, rather than the prosecutor. A 2015 study in the England and Wales found that males were 88% more likely than females to be sent for prison after committing similar crimes. This sex difference varies between crimes. The study found that there was a 35% difference from shoplifting or non-motor theft, and a 362% difference for offences relating to drug trade and production. A 2014 study in American Law and Economics Review found that in the United States, men receive 63% longer sentences than women on average, saying that "women are also significantly likelier to avoid charges and convictions, and twice as likely to avoid incarceration if convicted". Women of all races in the United States receive shorter sentences than men.

In Russia, the law prohibits the death penalty and life imprisonment for women, but not for men. Also, only men are subject to detention in strict and special regime correctional colonies. Convicted women are kept in general regime correctional colonies, regardless of the severity of the crime they committed. Rima Torosyan, a legal scholar, argues that the lack of differentiation in the issue of assigning the type of correctional institution for women is a violation of the principles of humanism and justice. She points out that the absence of this differentiation does not contribute to the rehabilitation of convicted women. She also believes that the fact that women commit crimes less often than men does not mean that crimes they commit pose a lower level of public danger.

== Violence against men ==
In the United States, crime statistics since 1976 show that men make up the majority (74.9%) of victims in murders. A study in 2023 found that people—especially women—are less likely to accept violence against women than violence against men. Discrimination also leads to the fact that men who are victims of violence do not show empathy.

In multiple countries rape is defined with penetrative sex, which means that by law, men who are forced to penetrate another person, but are not forcibly penetrated, are not considered to be rape victims. This includes England and Wales, the Philippines, and, until the 2020s, Switzerland.

In a number of jurisdictions, such laws were repealed through the efforts of the feminist movement.

=== Domestic violence ===
In a study looking at male victims of female-perpetrated domestic violence in Australia, victims reported that support services responded to them with ridicule, doubt, arresting the victims, and refusal by police to listen to their side of the story. Female-on-male is considered by society as less serious than male-on-female violence, and domestic violence studies and measures often exclusively take account for women.

In a study of psychologists in 2004, they found that psychologists rated that the actions of husbands were more likely to be psychologically abusive and more severe than wives who committed the same actions.

== Discrimination against LGBT men ==
Male homosexuality is criminalised or prosecuted in more jurisdictions than female homosexuality. There were at least 30 countries in 2002 where female homosexuality was not explicitly criminalised, but male homosexuality was illegal. Gay men are much more likely than lesbians to become victims of hate crimes. In 2008 the FBI's hate crime statistics show that 58.6% of crimes based on sexual orientation were motivated against gay men, whereas 12% were motivated against lesbians. Gay men face greater difficulties in adopting children than lesbians, even in countries where same-sex couples are allowed to adopt children.

As gender researcher M. Holleb points out, transgender men face a specific kind of discrimination based on the belief that trans men are actually women. This discrimination includes the invisibility of trans men in society. Researcher E. C. Krell writes about the existence of a "racialized transmisandry" faced by transgender men of color living in an atmosphere of strict control over black masculinity.

== Health ==
Military and criminal violence, suicides and industrial accidents are factors that contribute to the reduction of men's life expectancy, which is on average lower than that of women's. The frequency of fatal violence against men and the greater tolerance for violence against men may help explain why this is the case. In almost all countries of the world, men are also more likely than women to commit suicide. In the West and in Western Asian countries, the suicide rate among men is at least twice as high as among women, and sometimes the gap is even greater. Men also make up the majority of victims of fatal industrial accidents. In the United States, the death rate at work among men is about ten times higher than among women. Although women account for 43% of the hours worked for wages in the United States, they account for only 7% of accidents at work. The situation is worse in Canada, where men account for about 95% of workplace fatalities. In this country, the number of workplace deaths among men is about 10.4 per 100,000, while the corresponding figure among women is 0.4 per 100,000. In Taiwan, men account for about 93% of workplace fatalities.

=== Mental health ===
Much of mental health research is focused on women instead of men, which has caused scholars to describe problems faced by men as a "silent epidemic", an "invisible crisis", or a "quiet catastrophe". Men comprise between 75% and 80% of deaths by suicide, and around three quarters of those with substance use disorders. Despite this, only around 30% of people who use mental health services are men.

Literature on men's mental health has been described by multiple scholars as using an approach that is narrowly focused that borders on victim blaming, unlike the studies on women's mental health. These often focus on mental health issues being caused by "masculinity" and the attitudes and behaviours of men rather than "acknowledging a highly complex web of causation". This includes the World Health Organization, who have encouraged "programmes with men and boys that include deliberate discussions of gender and masculinity". Scholars have criticised that focusing on masculinity "blam[es] the victim; undervalu[es] positive male traits; and alienat[es] men in whom we seek to instill healthy behaviours".

Mental health advertising has been criticised by scholars for blaming men for their mental health issues. For example, the United States Agency for Healthcare Research and Quality have made campaigns with the slogan "this year thousands of men will die from stubbornness". The Australian mental health campaign, Beyond Blue have written "Men are known for bottling things up".

=== Circumcision ===
David Benatar argues that although circumcision in itself is not discriminatory, there are still several significant aspects of circumcision that can be characterised as discriminatory — among them he refers to the lack of anaesthesia when circumcising boys. He also writes about the contrast when Western society ignores the painful circumcision of boys with the removal of the entire foreskin and at the same time extremely negatively perceives minimally invasive forms of manipulation with the genitals of teenage girls (for example, a symbolic incision of the clitoris without removing any vulva tissues in Somali girls in the USA, which served as an alternative to traditional circumcision).

== Parenting ==
Less than 10 per cent of scientific studies about parents or parenting include fathers, and books about parenting almost exclusively focus on the mother. In an interview of 49 single fathers, they said that they perceived that society does not recognise their status as a single parent. Writing in the Family Law Quarterly journal, Jerry W. McCant says that society makes little or no effort to teach boys the social skills of nurturing. She described men as apart from their financial contributions, a 'disposable parent', due to society's belief that women are better equipped for parenting and that fathers are not considered parents. A 2025 meta-analysis found that parents reported giving daughters more favoured treatment over sons.

It is more difficult for gay men to adopt children than for lesbians, even in countries where same-sex adoption is legal.

Unlike motherhood, fatherhood is not mentioned in the Universal Declaration of Human Rights.

== Conscription ==
Opponents of discrimination against men, including some feminists, have criticised military conscription, or compulsory military service, as sexist. At the same time, the existing gender equality indices do not take into account gender-based mandatory conscription in peacetime for men.

Military registration only for men in the United States is one of the examples that men's rights activist Warren Farrell cites to argue that discrimination against men is pervasive. He writes that if any other group (for example, Jews, African Americans or women) were chosen at birth to become the only group for which registration for potential death would be required, society would call it anti-Semitism, racism or sexism. According to Farrell, men absorb society's ideas about military duty as a path to glory and power, and as a result do not consider it as discrimination.

=== Selective service ===
In 1981, the US Supreme Court in the Rostker v. Goldberg case recognised the constitutional practice of military registration of only the male part of the country's population, arguing that women could not serve in positions related to direct participation in hostilities. However, in 2015, the Pentagon lifted all restrictions on military service for women. In this regard, National Coalition For Men filed a lawsuit on the unconstitutionality of military registration aimed only at men, considering this practice discriminatory: men who do not register in Selective Service System at the age of 18 may be denied state benefits, such as employment in federal organisations and student loans. As a result, on 22 February 2019, a federal court in Texas agreed with human rights defenders, recognising the current system of military registration in the United States unconstitutional. However, in August 2020, this decision was overturned by the 5th Circuit Court of Appeals. In June 2021, the US Supreme Court refused to review the decision of the Court of Appeals.

=== In the former Soviet Union ===
In Soviet society, universal male military duty played a significant role in the construction of masculinity: Soviet ideas about militarised masculinity were based on the ideas of civic duty, heroism and patriotism, and Soviet gender ideology defined military service as the most important instance of turning a boy into a man. In post-Soviet Russia, the link between masculinity and militarisation, established by the institute of conscription, has undergone significant changes — largely for political and economic reasons. Unlike the Soviet one, the post-Soviet Russian state no longer provides men with the former social guarantees as a reward for militarisation, and the state's rupture of the former social contract leads to the reluctance of young men to go to military service. In addition, with the collapse of the Soviet state, militarised masculinity came into conflict with the new capitalist masculinity: many young men believe that military service is incompatible with a dynamic market economy and competition in the labour market. Scientists also state a significant gap between the state ideology of militarised patriotism and the sentiments of the Russian population, a significant part of which is sceptical about post-Soviet military conflicts and does not regard them as fair.

During the Russian invasion of Ukraine in 2022, the Ukrainian authorities, in order to mobilise men, banned men aged 18 to 60 from leaving the country before the end of hostilities, which is discrimination against men on the basis of gender and violation of human rights. Partial mobilisation in Russia is no less discriminatory for men, since it forces them to risk their lives and health and kill other people regardless of their views; at the same time, men who fled mobilisation in Russia are not even recognised by other countries as refugees.

== Other ==
=== Airline seating ===
Air New Zealand, Virgin Australia and Qantas banned men from sitting next to unaccompanied children in planes. They were criticised for promoting the idea that all men are paedophiles and removing the distinction between caring family men and paedophiles. It also associated all men with the actions of the minority of men. The policy was criticised for using the health of children to justify discrimination against men. It was described by multiple accounts of men that such policies made them afraid of being falsely accused of child abuse or paedophilia.

=== Women-only parking spaces ===
In several parts of Germany there are parking spaces reserved for women due to them experiencing higher rates of sexual assault. The law of some regions requires that 30 per cent of parking is women-only. It has been debated whether these are discriminatory and promote the stereotype that women are bad drivers. There is also women-only parking in Austria, Switzerland, China, Thailand and Indonesia. In Seoul, these were removed in efforts to promote gender equality.

== Gender studies ==
Discrimination against men has little research due to cultural bias. The Global Gender Gap Index has been criticised for only including disadvantages that disproportionately affect women, meaning that the index cannot measure when men are disadvantaged. It also does not penalise countries where girls outperform boys in education for example, treating it as if the genders were equal.

Factors as such suggest that in order to find reform in gender-based discrimination, an acknowledgment of patriarchal effects on both genders alike. "While the negative impact of patriarchal oppression on women and other minority communities has been long recognized," it is crucial to understand that men also suffer severe detrimental effects from this system.

== Extent and cause ==
The extent of discrimination against men in the modern world is the subject of debate in the scientific community.

Sociologist Øystein Gullvåg Holter characterises the position of men in the gender hierarchy rather as mixed, but not as purely dominant. Sociologist Fred Pincus says men may face intentional discrimination, although women are in a less favourable position than men; Pincus also believes that such cases of discrimination against men have nothing to do with positive discrimination. Psychologist Francesca Manzi says that since men are not typically discriminated, unlike women, discrimination against men is more difficult to detect. Estimates of the scale of the phenomenon may depend on discrepancies in the definition of the term "discrimination". According to her, the non-recognition of a number of unfavorable situations by discrimination may be influenced by traditional gender attitudes, which prohibit men from expressing stereotypical feminine behaviour.

== See also ==
- Femosphere
- Gender role
- Gender-based dress codes
- Negative gender pay gap
- Sex differences in social capital
- Sex segregation
  - Feminist separatism

== Works cited ==
- Eagly, Alice H. (1994). "Are people prejudiced against women? Some answers from research on attitudes, gender stereotypes, and judgments of competence". European Review of Social Psychology. 5: 1–35. doi:10.1080/14792779543000002.
- Eichler, Maya (2011). Militarizing Men: Gender, Conscription, and War in Post-Soviet Russia. Stanford University Press. ISBN 978-0-8047-7836-7.
- Farrell, Warren (1993). The Myth of Male Power: Why Men are the Disposable Sex (1st ed.). New York: Simon and Schuster. ISBN 978-0-425-18144-7.
- Holleb, M. L. E. (2019). "Transmisandry". The AZ of gender and sexuality: From Ace to Ze. Jessica Kingsley Publishers..
- Holter, Øystein Gullvåg (2005). "Can Men Do It? On Men, Caring and Gender Equality in an East and West European Perspective" (PDF). In Tereðkinas, Artûras; Reingardienë, Jolanta (eds.). Men and Fatherhood: New Forms of Masculinity in Europe. Vilnius: Eugrimas. pp. 114–146. ISBN 978-9955-682-35-6.
- Kane, Melinda D. (2015). "Decriminalizing Homosexuality: Gaining Rights through Sodomy Law Reform". The Ashgate Research Companion to Lesbian and Gay Activism. Routledge. ISBN 978-1-315-61314-7.
- Krell, E. C. (2017). "Is transmisogyny killing trans women of color? Black trans feminisms and the exigencies of white femininity". Transgender Studies Quarterly. 4 (2): 226–242. doi:10.1215/23289252-3815033.
- Ku, Manwai C. (2009). "Sexism". In Levine, John M.; Hogg, Michael A. (eds.). Encyclopedia of Group Processes and Intergroup Relations. SAGE Publications. pp. 744–749. ISBN 978-1-4522-6150-8.
- Manzi, Francesca (2019). "Are the processes underlying discrimination the same for women and men? A critical review of congruity models of gender discrimination". Frontiers in Psychology. 10 469. doi:10.3389/fpsyg.2019.00469. PMC 6414465. PMID 30894831.
- Pincus, Fred L. (2003). Reverse Discrimination: Dismantling the Myth. Lynne Rienner Publishers. ISBN 978-1-58826-203-5.
- Strunk, Kamden K.; Locke, Leslie Ann, eds. (2019). Research Methods for Social Justice and Equity in Education. Cham: Palgrave Macmillan. p. 308. doi:10.1007/978-3-030-05900-2. ISBN 978-3-030-05900-2. S2CID 149252223.
- Riach, P. A.; Rich, J. (2002). "Field Experiments of Discrimination in the Market Place" (PDF). The Economic Journal. 112 (483): F480–F518. doi:10.1111/1468-0297.00080. ISSN 0013-0133. S2CID 19024888.
- Wojnicka, K. (17 January 2023). "His body, his choice? Patriarchy, discrimination against men and protective masculinity at war". Norma: International Journal for Masculinity Studies. 18: 1–4. doi:10.1080/18902138.2023.2168849. S2CID 256136163.
