= Adversity.net =

Anti-affirmative action website (1997–2019)

- Available in: English
- Creator: Tim Fay
- Website: adversity.net
- Launched: 1997
- Current status: Inactive (redirects to FreePeopleSearch.com)

Adversity.net was a website dedicated to opposing affirmative action and other race-conscious policies. The site criticized such policies on the grounds that they adversely affect white people, and it claimed to have been established "for victims of reverse discrimination". The website was active between the years 1997 and 2019.

== History ==
Adversity.net was founded by businessman Tim Fay in 1997. Fay claims that he was the victim of reverse discrimination when, in 1987, the Federal Emergency Management Agency (FEMA) prohibited his four-person firm FayComm from bidding on a potential contract. Instead, FEMA awarded the contract to Technical Resources, Inc., a 100-person firm which the government had deemed "disadvantaged."

== Reception in academia ==
Sociologist Fred Pincus describes Adversity.net as "the premier site" promoting the idea that "whites are hurt" by race-conscious policies such as affirmative action. He also criticizes the site for misleadingly equating "goals" of affirmative action policies with racial quotas. Carol M. Swain wrote that adversity.net was an example of a website that was created to enable "whites who believe they have been victims of affirmative action programs to share their sense of grievance and outrage with a sympathetic audience of fellow whites."
