= Dream Hoarders =

2017 book by Richard Reeves

- Author: Richard V. Reeves
- Publisher: Brookings Institution Press
- Publication date: 2017
- ISBN: 978-0-8157-2912-9
- Website: brookings.edu/books/dream-hoarders

Dream Hoarders: How the American Upper Middle Class Is Leaving Everyone Else in the Dust, Why That Is a Problem, and What to Do about It is a book written by British author and senior Brookings fellow Richard Reeves and published in 2017.

The book analyzes America's upper middle class—what Reeves defines as the top quintile, or top 20% of America's economic class as a whole. In the book's analysis, Reeves makes the case that the biggest beneficiary of income inequality in the United States is not actually the top 1% of wealthy Americans. Rather, preferential college admissions such as legacy admissions, as well as favors retaining protectionist housing policy such as zoning practices, are mostly kept in place by the top 20% earners in the USA, and that these same individuals lobby for policies that prevent the social mobility of lower- and middle-class persons. Reeves argues that this top 20% group is effectively keeping many beneficial social program benefits for themselves at the expense of the bottom 80%, and thereby "hoarding" the American Dream.

== Content ==
The book opens by documenting how, in January 2015, then-President Barack Obama had tried to reform a George W. Bush-era tax plan that sent almost 90% of its benefit to the upper middle class: the college 529 plans. Reeves argues that the reform proposed by President Obama was, "...sensible, simple, and progressive. Remove the tax benefits from 529 college savings plans, which disproportionately help affluent families, and use the money to help fund a broader, fairer system of tax credits".

A major focus of Dream Hoarders is to argue that the upper middle class is best positioned to make the political changes needed to help all members of society, especially the bottom 80%. Reeves points out that over half of the wealth of Americans is held in the hands of the top 20%, and the largest share of active voters, and donors to political campaigns comes from this top quintile, not the 1%. In other words, the top 1% may be wealthy, but they are not numerous, whereas the top quintile has wealth and numbers of voters. Reeves also argues that nearly all members of the media reporting on issues of economic and income inequality are part of the upper middle class and thereby face a conflict of interest in reporting against their self-interest. He states:

Right now, there is something of a culture of entitlement among America's upper middle class. Partly this is because of a natural tendency to compare ourselves to those even better off than us. This is the "we are the 99 percent" problem. But it is also because we feel entitled to our position since it results from our own merit: our education, brains, and hard work.

Accordingly, Reeves argues that focusing on the top 1% of Americans is a mistake, saying that by scapegoating this tiny group, the upper middle class in the US has been able to "...convince ourselves we are in the same boat as the rest of America", and that this distracts from solving real problems facing Americans or producing tangible solutions. The book also claims hypocrisies amongst some activists, such as with the Occupy protestors from 2011: "more than a third of the demonstrators on the May Day 'Occupy' march in 2011 had annual earnings of more than $100,000" (equivalent to $143,121 in 2025). Reeves goes to great pains to explain that he includes himself in this overall criticism of the upper middle class, thus the usage of the word "we" in the "Will we share it?" Reeves explains:

You may have noticed that I am often using the term 'we' to describe the upper middle class rather than 'they.' As a Brookings senior fellow and a resident of an affluent neighborhood in Montgomery County, Maryland, just outside DC, I am, after all, writing about my own class. This is not one of those books about inequality that is about other people—either the super-rich of the struggling poor. This is a book about me and, likely, you, too.

Towards the end of the book, Reeves lays out his 7-point-plan to help address the issues he outlines earlier in the book:

1. Reduce unintended pregnancies through better contraception —"There are now highly effective, convenient forms of contraception available, known in wonky circles as LARCs (long-acting reversible contraceptives), but only a minority uses them. To say these methods are better than condoms or the pill is like saying that modern anesthetic is better than whiskey."
2. Increase home visiting to improve parenting — "Home visiting programs are a good place to start. These are centered on visits from parent educators, social workers, or registered nurses to families with pregnant mothers and babies in the home."
3. Get better teachers for unlucky kids — "The amount of money a school spends is not in any case a very good predictor of institutional performance. Nor is class size. What clearly does count is teacher quality. A good teacher, measured on a value-added (VA) basis, boosts college going and college quality as well as lifetime earnings, according to a study by Raj Chetty."
4. Fund college fairly — "Free college is a terrible idea; in practice it would be yet another boondoggle for the upper middle class... [Instead] a federally administered system, run cheaply and easily through the IRS, [could] base repayment levels on income".
5. Curb exclusionary zoning — "A particular problem is the inappropriate or onerous restrictions placed on housing development in many parts of the country. These deepen the wealth divide, worsen economic segregation, and contribute to inequalities in schooling. NIMBYism is opportunity hoarding".
6. End legacy admissions — "...there is one step toward more equal opportunity that could be simple and immediate: ending legacy preferences in college admissions... Legacy admissions are an embarrassment for a nation that prides itself on being a meritocracy."
7. Open up internships — "Legally, a simple but important step would be to increase the regulatory oversight of internships, to prevent abuse and to ensure that minimum wage and fair employment laws are properly enforced."

== Reception ==
The book was generally met with favorable reviews, including from Financial Times, The Atlantic, and National Review. Critics of the book included The New Republic,The Washington Post, and Vox.
