= Reverse sexism =

Sociological concept

Reverse sexism is a controversial term for discrimination against men and boys, or for anti-male prejudice. The term has been used to claim that men have become the primary victims of sexism. Specifically, opponents of affirmative action argue that men and boys are systematically discriminated against in employment and school admissions.

Reverse sexism has been compared by sociologists to the concepts of "reverse racism" and "reverse ethnocentrism" in that both are a form of backlash by members of dominant groups (e.g., men, whites, or Anglos). Reverse sexism is rebutted by analogy with the criticism of reverse racism as a response to affirmative action policies that are designed to combat institutionalized sexism and racism. In more rigid forms, this stance assumes that the historic power imbalance in favor of men has been reversed, and that women are now viewed as the superior gender or sex.

Feminist theorist Florence Rush characterizes the idea of reverse sexism specifically as a misogynist reaction to feminism; men's rights activists such as Warren Farrell promote the idea of reverse sexism to argue that the feminist movement has rearranged society in such a way that it now benefits women and harms men. In the preamble to a study on internalized sexism, Steve Bearman, Neill Korobov and Avril Thorne describe reverse sexism as a "misinformed notion", stating that "while individual women or women as a whole may enact prejudicial biases towards specific men or toward men as a group, this is done without the backing of a societal system of institutional power".

== See also ==
- Antifeminism
- Feminist separatism
- Male privilege
- Masculism
- Misandry
- Reverse discrimination
