= Of Boys and Men =

Book by Richard V. Reeves

- Book-cover 1st Edition, Hardcover
- Author: Richard V. Reeves
- Language: English
- Subject: Men, Men's rights, American youth, Social criticism, sociology
- Publisher: Swift Press (UK), Brookings Institution (US)
- Publication date: September 27, 2022 (UK), November 27, 2022 (US)
- Publication place: United States, United Kingdom
- Media type: Print, Audio-Book, eBook (Amazon Kindle, ePUB 3)
- Pages: 298 (first edition)
- ISBN: 978-1800750548 1st Ed., Hardcover
- Website: SwiftPress·Of Boys and Men

Of Boys and Men: Why the Modern Male Is Struggling, Why It Matters, and What to Do About It is a 2022 non-fiction book by British author Richard V. Reeves.

== Overview ==
The book drew significant public attention and media-coverage from several sides of the political spectrum, because the topic of men generally being considered as 'falling behind' has been one of interest to academia and the media.

In the book, Reeves argues that the advancement of women's rights and the changing job market, which now values cognitive skills over physical strength, have left some men feeling insecure and uncertain about their place in the world (i.e. without ontological security). The book also highlights the difficulties boys face in education. It suggests that boys are not performing as well academically as girls (with women outperforming men in various academic and professional domains), which can affect their future opportunities and contribute to their overall sense of frustration. It also notes the struggles faced by men in fulfilling their roles as providers and fathers, citing research which says that men in the US are now more likely to feel socially excluded and less likely to be successful after divorce.

Reeves says that these challenges have particularly hit Black men the hardest, as years of higher incarceration rates among Black men have severely limited their prospects in life. Similarly, men without college degrees have experienced declining wages, notable drops in life expectancy, and increased rates of family disruption. He notes that aspects of hypermasculinity promoted by popular culture is off-putting to modern men, and says that efforts towards achieving gender equality should also address the needs and concerns of boys rather than exclusively focusing on girls and women.
