= Richard V. Reeves =

Anglo-American writer (born 1969)

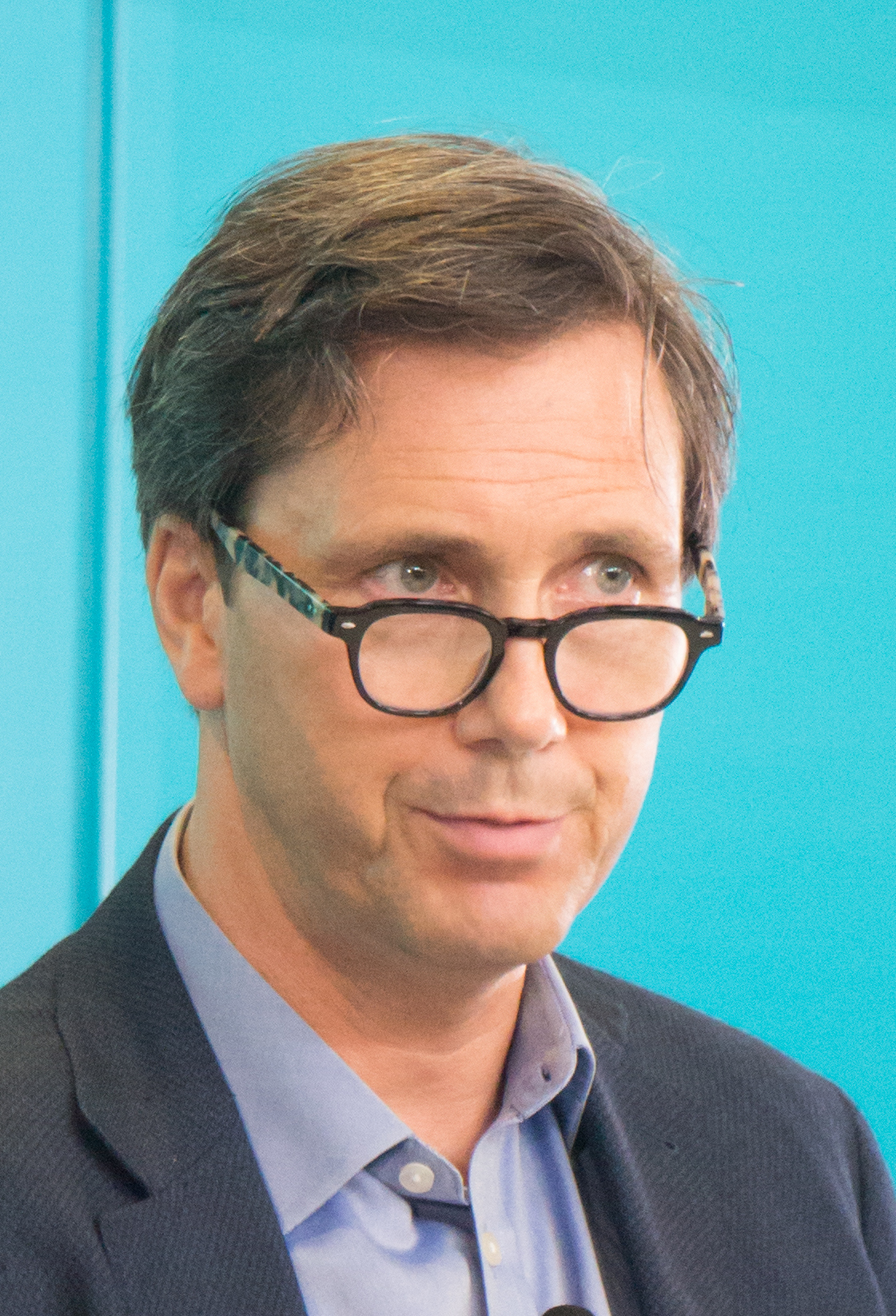
- Reeves in 2018
- Born: July 4, 1969 (age 57); Peterborough, United Kingdom
- Education: Wadham College, Oxford (BA); University of Warwick (PhD)
- Occupations: writer; scholar
- Writing career
- Pen name: Richard Thomas
- Subjects: History, philosophy, liberal politics
- Website: www.richardvreeves.com

Richard Vaughan Reeves (born 4 July 1969) is a British-American writer and social scientist. He is a Senior Fellow at the Brookings Institution and President of the American Institute for Boys and Men.

== Early life and education ==
Reeves was born in Peterborough, United Kingdom. He was educated in geography at Wadham College, Oxford. He later received a Ph.D. in philosophy from the University of Warwick.

== Career ==
Reeves has held positions including Director of Futures at The Work Foundation, a British non-profit organisation, Society Editor of The Observer, Economics Correspondent and Washington Correspondent of The Guardian, policy adviser to Frank Field when he was Minister for Welfare Reform, and director of the London-based think tank Demos.

In summer 2010 Reeves left Demos, joining the office of Deputy Prime Minister Nick Clegg, a Liberal Democrat, as a Special Advisor. Until 2012 Reeves was Director of Strategy to Nick Clegg.

In 2012 Reeves urged the Liberal Democrats to choose to become a radical centrist political party, "a hard-driving radical liberal party of the political centre", continuing his campaign for centre left Liberal Democrats to leave, "Any attempt to position the Liberal Democrats as a party of the centre left after five years of austerity government in partnership with the Conservatives will be laughed out of court by the voters – and rightly so. Anybody who wants a centre-left party will find a perfectly acceptable one in Labour. The Liberal Democrats need centrist voters, "soft Tories", ex-Blairites, greens".

Reeves was Director of the Future of the Middle Class Initiative at Brookings, working principally on issues related to intergenerational mobility, inequality and social change. In 2014, he published a Brookings Essay, Saving Horatio Alger, along with a video in which he used Lego bricks to illustrate levels of social mobility in the U.S. In May 2014, he appeared in a Daily Show segment satirizing how the complaints about the plight of the poorer members of the top 1% distracts from solutions to social mobility.

Reeves has published four books, including John Stuart Mill: Victorian Firebrand (2007), a biography of the British liberal philosopher and politician, Happy Mondays (2002) about job satisfaction, and Of Boys And Men: Why the Modern Male Is Struggling, Why It Matters, and What to Do about It (2022). He co-authored The 80 Minute MBA (2009) with John Knell, a condensed business management book.

Reeves appears regularly on radio and television as a political commentator and writes for a variety of publications including The New York Times, The Atlantic, The Guardian and The Observer. He is also a regular contributor to the online 'Think Tank' section of The Wall Street Journal. In 2005, he co-presented the four-part BBC2 series, Making Slough Happy. He writes regularly in British newspapers and magazines on politics, well-being, work and character. In 2008 he argued in The Guardian that social-liberals [a majority of Lib Dem members] should not be involved with the Liberal Democrats, but the Labour Party.

In June 2017, Reeves published a widely circulated New York Times op-ed, "Stop Pretending You're Not Rich".

Reeves's 2017 book is Dream Hoarders: How the American Upper Middle Class Is Leaving Everyone Else in the Dust, Why That Is a Problem, and What to Do about It.

In 2022, Reeves published Of Boys and Men, which David Brooks of The New York Times described as a “landmark” work. The book was named as one of the best books of the year by The Economist and The New Yorker. In The New Yorker, Idrees Kahloon wrote, “Reeves offers a wide menu of policies designed to foster a ‘prosocial masculinity for a postfeminist world.’” Former President Barack Obama included Of Boys and Men on his list of recommended “great books” in August 2024.

Reeves’s work has also drawn criticism. Some argue that the issues he addresses in education, employment, and family life are broad societal problems rather than specifically male ones. Michelle Goldberg of The New York Times wrote, “Dismissive of partisanship, Reeves elides the political and economic decisions that have made American life brutal, in different but overlapping ways, for women and men both.” Matthew Yglesias noted that “Reeves is focused on ‘boy solutions,’ but even here it’s often a little unclear how much sex really matters.” Conservative critics have taken issue with his relatively muted focus on marriage as a solution for men’s challenges, with one commentator arguing that “he implies that what fathers teach can be decoupled from their role as husband.”

In 2023, Reeves delivered a TED talk titled “How to solve the education crisis for boys and men” and produced several videos with Big Think, including “Male Inequality” and “The Friendship Recession,” the latter winning a Webby Award in 2024. That same year, he established the American Institute for Boys and Men, a think tank dedicated to “shaping policy and public conversation with reliable, non-partisan research.”

== Personal life ==
Reeves is a dual citizen, having been naturalized in October 2016 as an American citizen. As of 2018, he lives in Maryland.
