= Sex differences in social capital =

Sex differences in social capital are debated differences between men and women's ability to achieve their aims through social constructs such as trust, norms and networks. Social capital is often seen as the missing link in development. Social networks facilitate access to resources and protect the commons, whilst co-operation makes markets work more efficiently. Social capital has been thought of as women's capital because there are gendered barriers to accessing economic capital, whereas women's role in family and community ensures that they have strong networks. There is potential that the concept can help to bring women's unpaid 'community and household labour', vital to survival and development, to the attention of economists. However, research analysing social capital from a gendered perspective is rare, and the notable exceptions are very critical.

To summarise the debate, it is argued that communitarian theories of social capital naturalise the labour that women put into maintaining social networks and take advantage of rather than valorise their work in the community and family. Communitarian theories of social capital are the most prominent in development literature (mostly inspired by Putnam's 1994 work) and it is assumed that an increase in social capital is inherently good and can support political participation and market efficiency. Social capital is increased by building and fortifying the traditions and norms that underpin reciprocity, co-operation and trust. Whilst this could be seen to valorise the feminised role in maintaining these norms and traditions that is overlooked by development theories based on increasing GDP and getting the prices right, it could also be argued to ossify patriarchal traditions and norms and rely on women's naturalised, unpaid labour in the household and community.

Assuming that social capital is inherently good overlooks hierarchies, power dynamics and difference within 'communities' and groups, and that norms can be downward levelling as well as supportive. A Marxist approach, inspired by the work of Pierre Bourdieu (Bourdieu 1985), can bring out the 'downside' to social capital, and is argued to be crucial if the concept of social capital is to valorise rather than exploit women's labour. Network theorists define social capital as 'aggregate of the actual or potential resources which are linked to possession of a durable network' (Bourdieu, 1985: 248), allowing the relationship between social networks and economic resources to be examined, and potentially exploitative or restrictive traditions, norms and relationships to be identified.

Other critics claim that the concept of social capital is wholly inappropriate to the feminist project. Rather than being trapped in a paradigm that feminists have sought to problematise, gendered critiques of value and the economy would do better to draw on the work of Foucault than Bourdieu (Adkins 2005), or focus on economic diversity rather than how social capital supports capital-centric development (Gibson Graham 1996). However, given the prominence of social capital on the development agenda and the plethora of policy and academic work that refers to the term, it seems vital that the gendered dimensions of the debate be highlighted.

== See also ==
- Social support#Gender differences
