= Fred Pincus =

American sociologist and professor

Fred L. Pincus
- Born: September 6, 1942 (age 83); New York, NY
- Education: UCLA (B.A., 1964; M.A., 1967; Ph.D., 1969)
- Occupation: Sociologist
- Website: fredlpincus.com

Fred L. Pincus (born September 6, 1942, in New York City, New York) is an American sociologist and emeritus professor of sociology at the University of Maryland—Baltimore County, where he taught for 44 years. He is known for researching claims of reverse discrimination by whites and males in the United States.

== Education and career ==
Pincus received his degrees from the University of California, Los Angeles (B.A., 1964; M.A., 1967; Ph.D., 1969). He originally joined the University of Maryland faculty in 1968, and retired at the end of the 2012 spring semester.

Pincus is on the board of directors of the Research Associates Foundation, a Baltimore-based foundation that awards mini-grants to local activist groups and individuals. He is also co-president of the Baltimore Jewish Cultural Chavurah, a secular Jewish community that is affiliated with the Society for Humanistic Judaism.

== Published works ==
Pincus wrote extensively.

Books and Monographs

- Fred L Pincus (2020), Confessions of a Radical Academic: A Memoir. New York: Adelaide Books, ISBN 9781952570858
- Fred L Pincus (2011) Understanding Diversity: An Introduction to Class, Race, Gender, Sexual Orientation and Disability, 2nd Edition. Boulder, CO: Lynne Rienner Publishers,ISBN 9781588266217.
- Fred L Pincus (2003), Reverse Discrimination: Dismantling the Myth. Boulder, CO: Lynne Rienner Publishers, ISBN 1588262030
- Fred L Pincus; Howard J. Ehrlich, eds. (1999). Race and Ethnic Conflict: Contending Views on Prejudice, Discrimination and Ethnoviolence (2 ed.). Boulder, CO. ISBN 978-0813334981.
- Fred Pincus; Elayne Archer (1989). Bridges to Opportunity: Are Community Colleges Meeting the Needs of Minority Students?. New York: Academy for Educational Development and the College Entrance Examination Board. ISBN 9780685599310.
- Fred Pincus (1975). Education in the People's Republic of China. Baltimore: Research Group One.

Articles

- Understanding Diversity: An Introduction 3rd Edition, co-authored with Bryan R. Ellis. Boulder, CO: Lynne Rienner Publishers, 2021.ISBN 9781626379534
- Affirmative Action: Not the Harsh Impact on Whites That Some Assume (2021)
- "Test of Affirmative Action Knowledge". Current World Leaders: International Issues. 39: 94–104. April 1996.
