= The Red Pill =

2016 film by Cassie Jaye

- Promotional release poster
- Directed by: Cassie Jaye
- Produced by: Evan Davies; Cassie Jaye; Nena Jaye; Anna Laclergue
- Cinematography: Evan Davies
- Edited by: Cassie Jaye
- Music by: Douglas Edward
- Production company: Jaye Bird Productions
- Distributed by: Gravitas Ventures (DVD)
- Release dates: October 7, 2016 (New York City); March 7, 2017 (DVD release)
- Running time: 117 minutes
- Country: United States
- Language: English
- Budget: $211,260

The Red Pill is a 2016 American documentary film directed by Cassie Jaye. The film explores the men's rights movement, as Jaye spends a year filming the leaders and followers within the movement. It premiered on October 7, 2016, in New York City, followed by several other one-time screenings internationally. It was released on DVD and Blu-ray in 2017 by Gravitas Ventures.

== Overview ==
The "red pill", a metaphor borrowed from the 1999 film The Matrix, concerns embracing uncomfortable truths about reality. For men's rights activists (MRAs), this means accepting the belief that men are oppressed in a society dominated by women. The film shifts from Jaye's investigation of what she initially believed to be a hate movement to more sympathetic coverage of the movement. The shift is shown in the film through Jaye's questions about her own views on gender, power, and privilege. The Red Pill also discusses issues facing men and boys, including interviews with men's rights activists and those supportive of the movement, such as Paul Elam, founder of A Voice for Men; Harry Crouch, president of the National Coalition for Men; Warren Farrell, author of The Myth of Male Power; and Erin Pizzey, who started the first domestic violence shelter in the modern world. It also includes interviews with feminists critical of the movement, such as Ms. magazine executive editor Katherine Spillar, and sociologist Michael Kimmel. It additionally contains excerpts from Jaye's video diary.

Some of the issues discussed as facing men and boys are male suicide rates, workplace fatalities, high-risk jobs, military conscription, lack of services for male victims of domestic violence and rape, higher rates of violent victimization, issues concerning divorce and child custody, disparity in criminal sentencing, disproportionately less funding and research on men's health issues, educational inequality, societal tolerance of misandry, routine circumcision, men's lack of reproductive rights, the putative father burden, lower life expectancy, false rape allegations, paternity fraud, sperm theft and homelessness.

== Funding ==
According to Jaye, she initially struggled to find financiers for a film about the men's rights movement. In an October 2015 interview with Breitbart News, Jaye said "we weren't finding executive producers who wanted to take a balanced approach, we found people who wanted to make a feminist film." Jaye started a campaign on the crowdfunding platform Kickstarter, which she called a last resort. The Kickstarter page, which described the project as a "fair and balanced" look at the men's rights movement, was strongly criticized by some feminists. The campaign raised $211,260, exceeding its goal of $97,000.

Alan Scherstuhl's review for The Village Voice suggested that many of those providing funding for the film may have themselves been men's rights activists, thereby creating a conflict of interest. Jaye has said that the suggestion the film was funded by men's rights activists is "a common lie that keeps spreading," despite the fact one of the largest pledges to the film was by anti-feminist and men's rights supporter Mike Cernovich, who pledged $10,000 to the Kickstarter project. Still, Jaye maintained that "our five highest backers [...] are neither MRA nor feminist. I would say three out of five of them didn't even know about the men's rights movement, but wanted to defend free speech," and that the film's backers and producers would have no influence or control of the film.

== Release ==
The Red Pill had its world premiere on October 7, 2016, at Cinema Village in New York City. It played there for a week before opening in Los Angeles on October 14, 2016. One-time screenings were also scheduled at various locations in the United States, Canada, Europe, and Australia.

In March 2017, the film was made available online.

=== Screening cancellations ===
The Australian premiere at the Palace Kino cinema in Melbourne cancelled their planned November 6 screening after a petition circulated that called the film "misogynistic propaganda". The Change.org petition gained 2,370 signatures. A counter-petition to reverse the decision gained close to 5,000 supporters in the following days, characterizing the original petition as an "effort to close down free speech in Australia" by those who wished to prevent "a screening of a movie that discusses issues that they fear might interfere with their agenda." Organizer David Williams was critical of the original petition, stating that nobody who signed the petition would have seen the film.

The Mayfair Theatre in Ottawa cancelled a private screening of the film. Lee Demarbre, co-owner and programmer of the theater, said long-time patrons and a sponsor threatened to stop doing business with the venue if the film screening went ahead. The screening was organized by the Canadian Association for Equality (CAFE). Justin Trottier, co-founder of CAFE, said that the screening was an attempt to find common ground instead of polarizing the debate. Julie S. Lalonde, who runs Hollaback! Ottawa was one of several people who made complaints to the theater. She said the idea of freedom of expression was being abused, and that "no one has the right to have their film shown."

A screening had been planned by the Wildrose on Campus club at the University of Calgary, an organization for student supporters of the Wildrose Party of Alberta, but was cancelled after an email about the screening was sent out by the club with the subject line "Feminism is Cancer" and beginning "You and I both know that feminism is cancer. To create a dialogue on campus, we have decided to take action." The club later posted an apology to Twitter and cancelled the screening. In response to the controversy, Jaye said she would never equate feminism with cancer but "would be curious why do they think that."

After initially agreeing to finance a student screening, Sydney University's student union defunded the event, claiming the film promoted violence against women. In a public post on its website, the union said "We believe there is the distinct possibility that the planned screening of this documentary would be discriminatory against women, and has the capacity to intimidate and physically threaten women on campus". The screening was moved back a week and had to be financed privately by the clubs that had initially organized it.

== Reception ==
=== Critical response ===
Review aggregation website Rotten Tomatoes has given the documentary a 29% rating based on 7 critic reviews, with an average rating of 4/10.

Katie Walsh of Los Angeles Times said the documentary "lacks a coherent argument" because it "is built on a fundamental misunderstanding" of key terms. Walsh said the terms could have been better defined "to comprehend the ways in which patriarchal systems control resources to exploit both women and men". She recognized that "there are many dire and urgent troubles men face that should be addressed" but concluded of the documentary, "[It] only exacerbates that divide with its uncritical, lopsided presentation and inability to craft a compelling argument regarding a topic this controversial."

John DeFore of The Hollywood Reporter said, "Cassie Jaye's The Red Pill is clumsy and frustrating in many ways. But it demonstrates enough sincerity and openness to challenging ideas — letting representatives of this problematic movement make their case clearly and convincingly — that one wishes it were able to look at multiple sides of this debate at the same time." DeFore summarized the film as "an admirable attempt at evenhandedness whose journalistic and aesthetic failings dilute its arguments".

Alan Scherstuhl of The Village Voice, critical of the men's rights movement, considered the film's production quality weak due to being Kickstarter-funded and highlighted that it was campaigned for by A Voice for Men and Reddit's men's rights forums. Scherstuhl considered the documentary to be "amateurish" with weak visuals. He said, "What the film and the movement fail to demonstrate is any kind of systemic cause. Instead, the author of men's troubles here is always that vague bugaboo feminism, which we're told is designed to silence its opponents."

Cathy Young of Heat Street gave the film a positive review, saying it raised important issues that often go undiscussed and made "well-deserved" criticisms of feminism. She criticized the film for failing to devote attention to "the dark side of the men's movement", and stated that the film would have benefited from onscreen discussion of the subjects in which men's rights activists are on "far shakier ground".

Corrine Barraclough, of the Australian tabloid newspaper The Daily Telegraph, said "the message of The Red Pill is compassion" and the film made her "wonder why feminists tried so hard to silence this crucial conversation."

Common Sense Media gave the film 1/5 stars, proclaiming that the film was an "Unbalanced docu[mentary] about men's rights movement", further stating that the film was unfairly biased against women and that the general message of rejecting feminism is wrong.

=== Awards ===
The Red Pill won three awards at the 2017 Idyllwild International Festival of Cinema: "Best of Festival", "Excellence in Directing Documentary", and "Excellence in Producing a Documentary". Cassie Jaye also won the "Women in Film Award" at the Hollywood Digifest Festival for her work on the film.
