= 1988 Winnetka attacks =

Attacks in Illinois, US

- Location: Winnetka, Illinois, US
- Date: May 20, 1988
- Attack type: Poisoning; arson; mass shooting; school shooting
- Weapons: Arsenic poisoned snacks; Gasoline; Incendiary devices; .357 Magnum Smith & Wesson Model 19 revolver; .32 S&W Smith & Wesson Model 30 revolver; .22LR Beretta 21A Bobcat semi-automatic pistol
- Deaths: 2 (including the perpetrator)
- Injuries: 6
- Perpetrator: Laurie Dann

On May 20, 1988, 30-year-old Laurie Dann carried out a series of attacks in and around Winnetka, Illinois, United States, resulting in the death of 8-year-old Nick Corwin and injuries to six other people. In addition to the attacks in Winnetka, Dann mailed or personally delivered snacks poisoned with arsenic to several of her intended victims, however the doses were too diluted to cause harm.

The attacks began with taking two of her former babysitting client's sons on a supposed trip to a fair, but instead she drove them to Ravinia Elementary School in Highland Park where she set off an incendiary device inside a hallway, but the fire was put out without causing serious damage. Dann then drove the two children to a Jewish daycare where her ex-sister-in-law's daughter attended where she attempted to enter with a jerry can of gasoline, but she was stopped by staff. Dann then returned the two boys to their home, where she first tried to poison them, then set their house on fire, but the two children and their mother escaped.

Dann then drove to Hubbard Woods Elementary School in Winnetka, where she opened fire, killing Corwin and injuring five students. Dann then fled and took refuge inside a man's home after feigning that she was a rape victim who had just shot her attacker, but the police were after her because they were unaware it was in self-defense . Eventually, after the police zeroed in on her location, she shot the man and went into a bedroom where she fatally shot herself.

== Attacks ==
=== Poisonings and arsons ===
During the days before May 20, 1988, Dann prepared Rice Krispies Treats and juice boxes poisoned with the diluted arsenic she had stolen in Wisconsin. She mailed them to a former acquaintance, ex-babysitting clients, her psychiatrist, her ex-husband and others. In the early morning hours of May 20, she personally delivered snacks and juice "samples" to some of the intended recipients. Other snacks were delivered to Alpha Tau Omega, Psi Upsilon and Kappa Sigma fraternity houses and Leverone Hall at Northwestern University. Notes were attached to some of the deliveries. (Note: Sources ascribe similar notes to different recipients. For example, Associated Press articles mention that a note reading, "Love your little sisters. Enjoy" was sent to one family, while a Chicago Tribune article and Kaplan et al. (1991) suggests that similar notes ("Love, your little sisters. Enjoy" and "To the ATOs, from your little sisters") were received by the fraternities. Similarly, a longer text – "I'm going to be in Glencoe when your in town-look forward to seeing you guys. I was going to send you coffee cake, but I was making rice crispy treats for school and decided to send some. Enjoy. Love, Laurie" – was sent by mail according to Kaplan et al., and attached to the fraternity deliveries according to the Egginton (1991).) The drinks were often leaking and the squares unpleasant-tasting, so few were actually consumed. In addition, the arsenic was highly diluted so nobody became seriously ill.

At about 9am, Dann arrived at the home of the Rushe family, former babysitting clients in Winnetka, to pick up their two youngest children. The day before, she'd offered to resume babysitting their sons but was told that that wasn't necessary and they were going to move to New York shortly. Laurie managed to talk them into letting her take the boys to a fair. Instead of taking the children on the promised outing, she took them to Ravinia Elementary School in Highland Park, where she erroneously believed that both of her former sister-in-law's two sons were enrolled (in fact, one of Dann's intended targets was not even a student at the school). She left the two children in the car while she entered the school and tried to detonate an incendiary device in one of the corridors. After her departure, the small fire caused by the device was subsequently discovered by students and quickly extinguished by a teacher. Dann drove to a Jewish daycare center attended by her ex-sister-in-law's daughter and tried to enter the building with a plastic can of gasoline but was stopped by staff.

Dann next drove the children back to their home and offered them some arsenic-poisoned milk, but the boys spat it out because they found the taste strange. Once inside the house, Dann lured the children downstairs and used gasoline to set fire to the house, trapping them and their mother in the basement, though they managed to escape.

=== Hubbard Woods Elementary School shooting ===
Dann drove three and a half blocks away to the Hubbard Woods Elementary School, armed with three handguns. It is speculated that she was out to get the Rushes' two older children but they were on a field trip that day. She wandered into a second-grade classroom for a short while, then left. Finding a boy in the hallway, six year old Robert Trossman, Dann pushed him into the boys' washroom and shot him in the chest with her Beretta pistol. Her Smith & Wesson revolver malfunctioned when she tried to fire at two other boys, and she threw the weapon into the trash along with its spare ammunition. The boys fled the washroom and alerted staff. Dann then reentered the second-grade classroom, where students were working in groups on a bicycle safety test. She ordered all the children into the corner of the room. The teacher attempted to disarm Dann, managing to unload the Beretta in the struggle. Dann drew her other Smith & Wesson from the waistband of her shorts and aimed it at several groups of the students. She shot five children, killing Nick Corwin with a single shot to the heart and wounding four others (Mark Tiborec, Peter Monroe, Lindsay Fisher, and Catherine Miller) before fleeing in her car. She saw a police car coming so turned around and went the other direction.

=== Hostage-taking and final stand-off ===
Dann was prevented from leaving the area by car because the roads were closed for a funeral cortege. She decided to drive her car backwards down the nearby street, but took a corner too fast and crashed into a tree. Abandoning the wrecked car, Dann removed her bloodstained shorts and tied a blue garbage bag around her waist. With her two remaining guns she made her way through the woods and came upon the house of the Andrew family. Dann entered the house and met Mrs. Andrew and her twenty-year-old son, Philip, who were in the kitchen. She claimed she had been raped by a man in her car and had shot the rapist in the struggle but police didn't realize this and were after her.

Taking Dann's story at face value, the Andrews tried to convince her that she need not fear police because she had acted in self-defense. Mrs. Andrew gave Dann a pair of her daughter's pants to wear. While she was putting them on, Philip was able to pick up and pocket Dann's Beretta. At his suggestion, Dann called her mother, telling her she had done something terrible and that the police were involved. Philip took the phone and explained Dann's story about the rape and shooting, suggesting that Dann's mother to come pick her up; Dann's mother said she could not come because she did not have a car.

After Mr. Andrew arrived home, the family began to insist that Dann give up her second gun. When Dann called her mother again, Mr. Andrew spoke with her, asking her to persuade Dann to give up the gun. He described Edith Wasserman as "disinterested" and only remarked that she hoped her daughter would get home safely before hanging up. During this call, Mrs. Andrew left the house and alerted police. Mr. Andrew told Dann that he would not remain in the house if she did not put down the gun and leave. Dann ordered Philip to stay. Just before noon, Dann saw police advancing on the house and shot Philip in the chest. Philip managed to escape out the back door before collapsing and being rescued by first responders.

With the house surrounded, Dann went upstairs to a bedroom. Her parents and ex-husband were brought to the house. At about 7pm, an assault team entered the house while Dann's father attempted to get her attention with a bullhorn. The police found her body in the bedroom; she had shot herself in the mouth.

== Victims ==
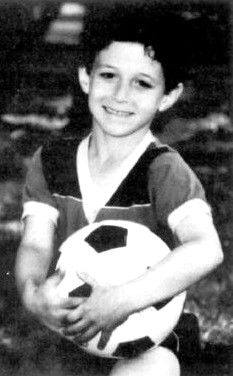
Portrait of Nick Corwin

Nick Corwin was born on April 9, 1980, to Joel and Linda Corwin in Chicago. In school, he was a student athlete known for his sportsmanship and skill. His name has since been attached to a popular soccer field and playground in Winnetka, Illinois, a suburb of Chicago.

According to a report in People magazine, 1,500 people attended Corwin's funeral. Shortly after his death, playing on the meaning of his name (“giver of gifts”) his friends and schoolmates created a book, The Gifts that Nicholas Gave.

Following Corwin's death, Winnetka passed a handgun ban, which stood until D.C. vs Heller and subsequent NRA lawsuits. Corwin is interred at Memorial Park Cemetery in Skokie, Illinois. All but one of the victims wounded by Dann recovered from their injuries, including a girl who was shot and suffered severe internal injuries. The victims and their parents received extensive support to help them cope with the psychological after-effects of the attacks.

== Perpetrator ==
=== Early life ===
Laurie Dann was born Laurie Wasserman on October 18, 1957, and grew up in Glencoe, Illinois, a north suburb of Chicago. She was the daughter of Edith Joy and her husband, accountant Norman Wasserman. The family was Jewish and she had one older brother.

Laurie was described as shy and had trouble socializing; in childhood she displayed signs of obsessive-compulsive disorder but they seemingly disappeared when she started adolescence. In high school she had a couple of short-term romantic relationships. The Wassermans vacationed in Hawaii over the 1973 holiday season during which time Laurie met Barry Gallup, a year older than she and also from the Chicago area. They continued seeing each other after going home to Illinois but Barry graduated high school the following spring, went to college, and broke off the relationship. The Wassermans moved to a different neighborhood in 1974 and Laurie would attend a different high school for her senior year. During a summer trip to Aspen, Colorado, she met another boy her age named Wade Keats, also from the Chicago area, and they continued seeing each other afterwards but broke it off in two months. Laurie pursued several brief relationships for the rest of her senior year and also got plastic surgery to reduce the size of her nose. She graduated from Winnetka's New Trier High School in 1975, and despite poor grades was able to attend Drake University in Des Moines, Iowa. When her academic record improved, Dann transferred to the University of Arizona ostensibly to pursue a teaching career, although she told an acquaintance that she really just wanted to find a husband. She dated a pre-med student named Steve Witt, but he prioritized his education over his love life and Laurie was denied the attention she desired. Eventually Witt was accepted for residency in an Arizona hospital and ended the relationship. In the summer of 1977, Dann attended the University of Wisconsin in Madison, taking a course in home economics.

In 1980, Dann moved back to her parents' home. She then transferred to Northwestern University to complete her degree, but dropped out of all her classes and never graduated.

=== Marriage and divorce ===
Picture of Laurie Dann

Laurie began working as a cocktail waitress at Green Acres, an exclusively Jewish country club, where she met Russell Dann, a 25 year old insurance salesman for his parents' insurance firm. She told him a series of exaggerated claims about herself, including that she was a graduate student at Northwestern University and working towards a career in hospital administration. She also claimed to have previously worked for Dann Brothers Insurance and that she possessed an accounting degree from the University of Arizona. They dated for nine months before marrying at the Green Acres club on September 11, 1982, and honeymooned in the British Virgin Islands. However, the marriage quickly soured as Russell's family noted signs of obsessive–compulsive disorder (OCD) and other strange behavior from his wife, including leaving trash around the house. She was also repeatedly fired from various jobs, claiming to her husband in each case that she either quit voluntarily or was fired for reasons outside her control. Russell's family considered Laurie childish and anti-social and developed a dislike for her. Once at a family gathering she served a dish of rotting potatoes. Laurie saw a psychiatrist for a short period, quitting after three months, and although Russell eventually talked her into returning to it, she did not take it seriously.

Russell attended one of her therapy sessions in September 1985, shortly after their third anniversary, and found that she'd never fully disclosed her problems to her therapist. His family began pressuring him to divorce her, however Russell hoped she would improve and bought Laurie a gift of a pink sweatsuit and a bouquet of flowers. She proceeded to carry the flowers around with her even after they died and refused to take off the sweatsuit for fear that Russell would leave her if she did. In October, he announced he wanted a divorce. Laurie moved back in with her parents and her psychological problems escalated. The divorce negotiations were acrimonious, with Laurie claiming that Russell was abusive, and telling him if she couldn't have him, nobody could. Over the following months, police were called to investigate various incidents involving Laurie, including several harassing phone calls made to Russell and his family. In April 1986, Laurie accused Russell of breaking into and vandalizing her parents' house, where she was then living. On May 5, she purchased a Smith & Wesson Model 19 .357 Magnum, telling the salesman that she needed it for self-defense. She filled out all the registration work and received the gun three days later. Since Laurie did not have a criminal record, she was able to legally obtain a firearm but police were concerned and unsuccessfully tried to persuade Laurie and her parents that she should surrender it. During June, Laurie was in the process of divorce negotiations with Russell in which her father demanded a $100,000 lump settlement with $20,000 monthly alimony payments for ten years. Although Russell was wealthy, his lawyers argued Laurie had no need for this level of financial support and demanded a copy of her college records to establish she was able to financially support herself. After obtaining them, they found out that she never graduated and had never been a research assistant.

In August 1986, Laurie contacted her ex-boyfriend Steve Witt, who was by then a resident at a New York hospital and now married to a different woman, and claimed to have given birth to his child. As he had not seen Laurie in five years he dismissed her claim; Dann called the hospital where he worked and claimed her ex-boyfriend had raped her in the emergency room.

In September 1986, Russell accused Laurie of stabbing him in his sleep with an icepick, barely missing his heart, despite not having seen his attacker. Police decided not to press charges based on a medical report which suggested that the injury might have been self-inflicted, as well as Russell's abrasive attitude towards investigators and a failed polygraph test. Russell and his family continued to receive harassing phone calls, and Laurie was arrested for abusive calls made to Russell's sister. The charges were dropped due to lack of evidence.

In February 1987, Laurie and Russell agreed to split the profit from selling their house,as well as $10,000 for Laurie's legal fees, and $1,250 a month paid to Laurie for three years. Just before their divorce was finalized in April, Laurie accused Russell of raping her. There was no physical evidence supporting Laurie's claim, although she passed two polygraph tests. In May, Laurie accused Russell of placing an incendiary device in her home. She showed police an intact Molotov cocktail she said was placed in her house and claimed a lit candle had been set up to activate its fuse. She also said a window screen was cut out. Police failed to find anything to incriminate Russell. No charges were filed against him for either incident. Laurie's parents believed her claims and supported her throughout. By this time, she was being treated by another psychiatrist for OCD and a "chemical imbalance"; the psychiatrist told police that he did not think Laurie was suicidal or homicidal.

=== Final year ===
During this time Laurie Dann began working as a babysitter and placed advertisements around the neighborhood for her services. Some clients thought well of her. However, others made complaints to police about damage to their furniture and the theft of food and clothes. Despite these complaints, no charges were filed. Dann's father paid for damages in one case.

In the summer of 1987, Dann sublet a university apartment in Evanston, Illinois. Once again, her strange behavior was noted, including riding up and down in elevators for hours, wearing rubber gloves to touch metal and leaving meat to rot in sofa cushions. She took no classes at the university. That autumn, Dann claimed she had received threatening letters from Russell and that he had sexually assaulted her in a parking lot, but police did not believe her claims. A few weeks later, she purchased a .32-caliber Smith & Wesson Model 30-1 revolver.

With her mental condition deteriorating, Dann and her family sought specialized help. In January 1988 she moved back to Wisconsin to live in a student residence while being observed by a psychiatrist who specialized in OCD. She had already begun taking clomipramine, a drug for OCD, and her new psychiatrist increased the dosage, adding lithium carbonate to reduce her mood swings and initiating behavioral therapy to work on her phobias and ritualistic behaviors. Despite the intervention, Dann's strange behavior continued, including riding elevators for long periods, changing television channels repetitively and an obsession with "good" and "bad" numbers. She gained a reputation on campus as "the psycho elevator lady." There were also concerns about whether Dann was bulimic.

Dann purchased a .22-caliber Beretta 21A Bobcat at the end of December 1987. In March 1988, she stopped attending her appointments with the psychiatrist and behavior therapist. At the same time, Dann began to make preparations for the attacks. She stole library books on poisons, and diluted arsenic and other chemicals from a lab. She also shoplifted clothes and wigs to disguise herself and was arrested for theft on one occasion. Both her psychiatrist and her father tried to persuade Dann to enter the hospital as an inpatient, but she refused.

Dann continued to make numerous hang-up phone calls to her former in-laws and babysitting clients. Eventually, the calls escalated to death threats, telling her babysitting clients that their children were going to die. She eventually called Steve Witt and threatened him as well. However, some victims of her phone calls were chosen at random and had no connection to her at all. Once Dann called the family of a boy who'd won a spelling bee and told them she would kill their son. In May 1988, a letter, later confirmed to have been sent by Dann, was sent to the hospital administration where her ex-boyfriend worked, again accusing him of sexual assault. Assistant US Attorney Janet Johnson considered charging Dann with making threatening interstate phone calls, which she described as "frightening to listen to." Police were unable to convince Norman Wasserman to surrender his daughter's guns. Witt, fearful of publicity, and concerned about Dann getting bail and then attempting to fulfill her death threats, decided to wait until other charges were filed in Illinois before reporting her threats. That same month, a janitor found Dann lying in the fetal position inside a garbage bag in a trash room. This precipitated a search of her room and her departure back to her parent's home in Glencoe. FBI agents arrived at her vacated apartment to question Dann about the threatening phone calls to Witt but since the case was considered a low-priority one, they did not bother searching for her further.

== Aftermath ==
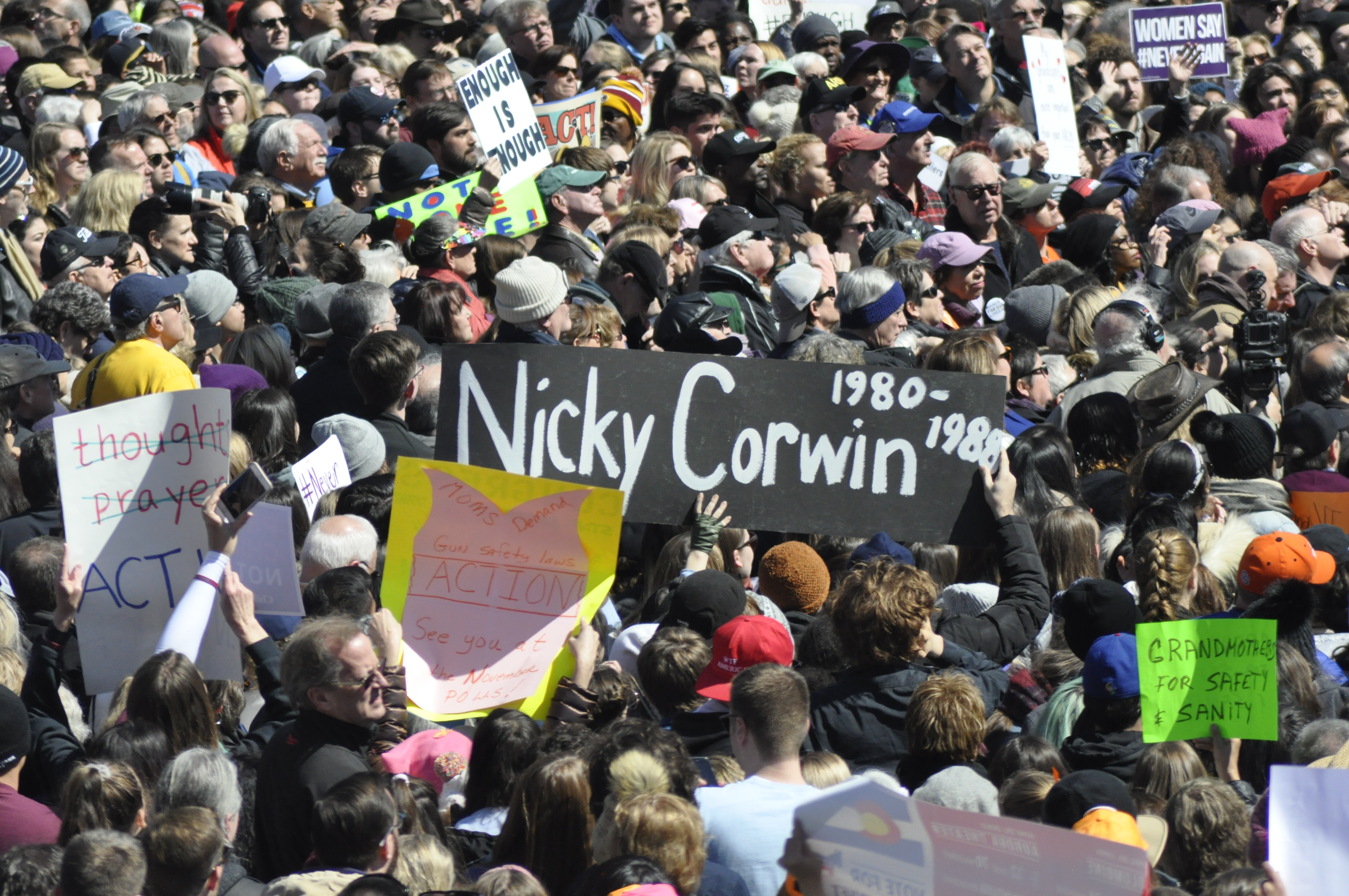
Nicky Corwin remembered at March for Our Lives on 24 March 2018 in Washington, D.C.

Corwin's murder inside an elementary school was among the first to feature prominently in the 24-hour news cycle, mostly revolving around Dann's mental state. Because no other school shooting had received such wide coverage, the murder is sometimes called “the first school shooting.” Since Corwin's murder, a school shooting has been widely reported almost every year. Others noted that the shooting marked an "end of innocence" for the prosperous community along Chicago's North Shore, which had not seen a murder in thirty years.

Parents and members of the community subsequently devoted many years to campaigning for gun control policy. Philip Andrew gave interviews about gun control from his hospital bed, and later became active in local and state gun control organizations as the executive director of the Illinois Council Against Handgun Violence; he subsequently became a lawyer and then an FBI agent.

Dr. Donald Monroe, superintendent of Winnetka School District 36, noted "his 'safe' school" was "not as isolated and insulated as we thought." At the time of the shooting, Hubbard Woods, like many schools, was an open campus, with many doors, such as those to individual classrooms, kept open. After the shooting, a pattern of single-point entry emerged in more schools.

The shooting also fueled the debate about criteria for committing mentally ill people to health facilities against their will. Some favored the involuntary commitment of a person who is determined to be mentally ill and incapable of making informed decisions about treatment; civil libertarians like Benjamin Wolf opposed the idea, saying, "It would be a shame if we cut back on the civil liberties of literally millions of mentally ill people because of the occasional bizarre incident."

A book on the tragedy called Murder of Innocence, written by Eric Zorn, was adapted into a made-for-television film. In the film, Dann's name is changed to "Laurie Wade"; she was played by Valerie Bertinelli. Russell Dann helped coach Bertinelli while she was preparing for the role.

== Search for a rationale ==
Some blamed Dann's parents for shielding her in spite of the signs of her deteriorating mental health. Investigations were hampered by their refusal to be interviewed by police or to provide access to Dann's psychiatric records, which were eventually obtained by court order. On the night of the shooting, Dann's parents allowed only a very brief search of her bedroom; afterwards, they cleaned the room and removed potential evidence. Norm Wasserman also insisted Laurie's wrecked Toyota be returned to him as it was registered in his name. Police were also criticized for not sealing off the bedroom as a crime scene. Parents of the shooting victims subsequently sued Dann's parents for damages.

Further criticism was directed at Dann's psychiatrists for failing to identify or take action regarding the signs of her failing mental stability. At the time of her death, Dann was taking clomipramine, which had not yet been approved by the FDA for prescription usage. The drug's effects were initially considered as contributing factors to Dann's mental decline, but ultimately ruled out.

Two newspaper clippings were found among Dann's possessions. One described a man who randomly killed two people in a public building. The other described a depressed young man who had attempted to commit suicide in the same way that Dann did; he survived and discovered that his brain injury had cured him of his OCD.

One theory of Dann's rationale was that she targeted people who had "disappointed" her in some way: her ex-husband, her former sister-in-law (through the firebombing attempts at her children's schools and daycare), her ex-boyfriend and his wife, the family whose children she had abducted, as well as former friends and babysitting clients.

Dann was also briefly investigated as a possible suspect in the Chicago Tylenol murders, but no direct connection was found.

In his book The Myth of Male Power, author Warren Farrell suggested that Dann's actions were an example of women's violence against men. He claimed, erroneously, that all of Dann's victims were male, that she had burned down a Young Men's Jewish Council, had burned two boys in a basement, had shot her own son and had justified the murder of Nick Corwin by claiming he was a rapist. Men's rights activists, academics, and the media have repeated Farrell's errors and conclusion. Farrell later issued a partial correction on his web site. (Note: "While Laurie Dann did go into a boys' bathroom and not a girls' bathroom, and tried to kill the boys for whom she was a babysitter, the Chicago Tribune on May 21, 1988, section 1, does list two women who were direct victims of Laurie Dann, and a mother who was an indirect victim, when she tried to rescue her two sons who had been taken to a basement by Laurie Dann, who immediately lit a fire in the basement. Therefore my suggestion that she was a parallel force to the celebrated University of Montreal killer who focused on women, was not accurate. — W. Farrell")

== See also ==
- List of homicides in Illinois
- List of school shootings in the United States by death toll
