= Canadian Association for Equality =

Canadian non-profit organization

- Abbreviation: CAFE
- Founder: Justin Trottier
- Type: Registered Educational Charity
- Purpose: Public education and outreach
- Headquarters: Canadian Centre for Men and Families (Toronto)
- Official language: English
- Key people: James Brown (President)

The Canadian Association for Equality (CAFE) is a Canadian non-profit organization. CAFE has frequently been characterized as a men's rights group by sources, though the organization denies this. In March 2014 the Canadian Association for Equality was granted charitable status by the Canada Revenue Agency, making it the first charity focused on men's issues.

CAFE is sometimes portrayed as a moderate and academic voice, particularly by members of men's movement, such as author Warren Farrell, though media reports have characterized the group as controversial, and various feminist, student, and anti-domestic violence groups associate CAFE with more radical men's rights organizations such as A Voice for Men. CAFE spokesperson Justin Trottier has denied these allegations.

CAFE hosts a regular series of speakers and talks, featuring speakers such Warren Farrell, University of Ottawa English Professor Janice Fiamengo, and McGill Professors Katherine K. Young and Paul Nathanson. Other events have included a presentation by York University Sociologist Dr. Robert Kenedy on the new discipline of male studies, a talk by National Post columnist Barbara Kay on family courts and fatherhood, and a talk by prostate cancer survivor Aaron Bacher on men's health. The group has also hosted anthropologist Lionel Tiger.

== History ==
=== Campus activities ===
CAFE became the focus of mainstream media attention when they hosted author and masculinist Warren Farrell to speak at the University of Toronto on November 16, 2012. The talk was met with protests from a coalition of controversial activist groups, U of T Students United Against Sexism. The protesters accused Farrell and CAFE of "misogyny, and of protecting and denying male privilege." The event attracted a group of about 50–100 protesters who argued that Farrell's talk was hate speech and chanted "No Hate Speech on Campus" throughout the demonstration. The event was briefly delayed after protesters blocked access to the venue, before police intervened, allowing the event to proceed. Police and campus police who were stationed at the event arrested one protester before releasing them without charge, while another was cautioned for assaulting a police officer. After the protest, several of the women who had protested against Farrell's talk were subjected to online bullying and harassment, after their pictures, names, and other identifying information were posted on the website register-her.com, which was operated by American men's rights group A Voice for Men.

Follow up events in CAFE's monthly lecture series were also marked by significant protest, and required a police or campus police presence. These events included a presentation by Professor Janice Fiamengo titled "What's Wrong with Women's Studies," and a panel discussion by McGill academics Professors Katherine K. Young and Paul Nathanson, authors of Spreading Misandry: The Teaching of Contempt for Men in Popular Culture. After protests at a CAFE event in April 2012, A Voice for Men uploaded a video of one of the protesters. The video quickly reached more than 100,000 views online, while hundreds of men's rights activists posted comments threatening to beat, rape, and murder the woman in the video. The woman told Maclean's that men's rights activists distributed her home address and personal information online, and sent her hundreds of graphic, and sexualized threats of violence – some of which included personal details such as her favourite bars and her dog's name.

CAFE has faced resistance from student's unions and other activist groups in attempting to set up campus chapters. The University of Toronto Student Union rejected an application for ratification from the University of Toronto Men's Issues Awareness Society in 2012, and in March 2013 the Ryerson Students' Union (RSU) rejected the application for ratification from the Ryerson Equality Association for failing to "centre women's voices." The Ryerson group was led by two female students. In the week prior to rejecting the group, the RSU had passed an emergency motion to oppose "the concept of misandry," a position they then referenced to justify the group's prohibition. In January 2014 the Canadian Association for Equality announced it would sponsor events at Ryerson hosted by members of the University community, starting with a presentation by female men's activist Karen Straughan in February 2014.

By 2016, CAFE was affiliated with 15 men's issues campus groups across Canadian universities. The group frequently sponsors events hosted by the University of Toronto Men's Issues Awareness Society." In November 2015, the Ryerson University Men's Issues Awareness Society was denied certification.

=== Charity application ===
In March 2014 the Canadian Association for Equality was granted charitable status by the Canada Revenue Agency. In its application for charitable status, the group listed organizations such as the Women's Legal Education and Action Fund, Egale Canada and the Status of Women Canada as potential participants in panel discussions and other CAFE events. When informed that they had been listed as potential participants in CAFE events on the application, however, LEAF charged CAFE with being "very disingenuous" with their application, noting that "we absolutely are not associated with this group and what they stand for," while an Egale Canada spokesman made it clear that "Egale is not affiliated or associated with [CAFE] in any way." Queens University Professor Sarita Srivastava was "stunned" to learn that CAFE had claimed to be "currently" setting up a panel discussion with her on their charitable status form, noting that she had declined to participate in such a discussion months earlier. Several individuals and organizations listed on the application suggested that CAFE had a "problem with their reputation" and had invited listed feminist individuals and groups on the application "to counter criticism that they are anti-feminist and one-sided."

=== Equality Day Concert ===
In May 2014, CAFE organized an Equality Day concert in support of men's parental rights and Conservative MP Maurice Vellacot's Bill C-560, "An Act to amend the Divorce Act (equal parenting)," which was defeated on May 28. The event was scheduled to take place at Artscape Gibraltar Point, a performance space on the Toronto Islands, but Artscape cancelled the event days before it was scheduled to place, after receiving an email which indicated that the event might be a political one, in contravention of Artscape's policies. An Artscape spokesperson suggested that the event had been presented to them as "a fair and equitable event that was family-friendly and a lovely music festival," but that Artscape had elected to cancel the event after it "turned political." Three of the musical acts which had been scheduled to perform at the event later suggested that they had been misled about the event's purpose and CAFE's platform. Musical group the Hogtown Brewers apologized for their involvement, noting that "we were not aware of the true nature" of CAFE, and suggesting that "we would not have knowingly supported this cause." Similarly, musical group Giraffe suggested that "we feel that we were not fully informed about what it was that is being supported here," and that CAFE had been "intentionally misleading to us in its effort to entice us to play this show."

=== Canadian Centre for Men and Families ===
In 2013, the Canadian Association for Equality announced plans to build Toronto's first "Men's Centre," to be named the Canadian Centre for Men and Families. After a successful capital campaign, the Centre opened in downtown Toronto in November 2014, under the directorship of CAFE co-founder Justin Trottier. The Centre runs a variety of men's programs: counseling and peer support, a fathering group, legal services, mentorship for boys and young men, and support for male victims of domestic violence, sexual abuse and trauma. The center has worked to raise awareness of domestic violence against men, and Trottier has said that "We've long known that domestic violence victims span all ages, races and ethnicities. Now we're becoming aware they also span all genders and sexual orientations. Yet fathers and their children experiencing abuse often have no place to go."

Writing about male suicide rates, The Province writer Kent Spencer called the center "the country's first men's-only shelter in Toronto, which provides safe space, peer support and services for male victims of trauma and violence."

In August 2017, CAFE became the first organization for male survivors of domestic abuse authorized by Legal Aid Ontario to provide legal aid certificates to male victims of domestic violence.

=== Pride parade controversy ===
On June 27, 2014 Pride Toronto revoked CAFE's permit to march in the 2014 World Pride Parade, despite regulations which prohibited the cancellation of permits after June 21. Pride Toronto executive director Kevin Beaulieu explained the decision to bar CAFE from the parade by suggesting that it had been made out of concern that the CAFE's work "may contravene the spirit of the Mission, Vision and Values of Pride Toronto," and in response to public concerns "about the activities and purpose of CAFE and whether they actually match the intent they express" CAFE representatives characterized the decision to exclude their organization from the parade as "regrettable," asserting that the organization is "not anti-woman" and is "absolutely inclusive." Despite having their permit to march revoked, CAFE members marched in the June 29 Parade, alongside marchers from the Sherbourne Health Center, a community clinic focused on the health needs of new immigrants to Toronto, the lesbian, gay, bisexual, and transgender community, and the homeless or under-housed. The CAFE members initially arrived at the parade wearing CAFE T-shirts, but were asked to wear Sherbourne Health Center T-shirts instead, and they passed out CAFE buttons along the parade route. Speaking to the press after the Parade, Sherbourne Health Center's director of human resources stated that the group had been unaware of the controversy surrounding CAFE's participation in the parade. Stating that "Sherbourne unequivocally does not endorse or support CAFE," he suggested that "had we had time to conduct any background research, we would have politely declined their request to join us." In June 2015, CAFE was banned from all future events organized by Pride Toronto, in response to community complaints that the participation of CAFE would "directly undermine the participation of queer, lesbian and trans women in the Pride Parade."

On August 23, CAFE walked in the Ottawa Pride parade. The Ottawa Sun, which covered their participation, interviewed Tammy Dopson, chair of the community advisory committee, who explained they received "no complaints about CAFE participating in the parade this year" and went on to say "Unless they're practising hate speech, there's no reason to exclude them," said Dopson. "Like many other people marching the parade, people agree and disagree."

=== Billboard Campaigns ===
In March 2015, CAFE unveiled a billboard in downtown Toronto, which asserted that "half of domestic violence victims are men," and that "no domestic violence shelters are dedicated to us." The campaign coincided with International Women's Day, and took place shortly after Ontario Premier Kathleen Wynne announced a three-year plan to combat sexual violence. In a news release, CAFE suggested that Wynne's violence against women initiative "reinforces sexist stereotypes that ignore violence against men, gays, and lesbians, and endanger children with abusive mothers." In an interview with CBC, Trottier stated that while "initiatives to combat violence against women are necessary and praiseworthy," policies "should be built on facts rather than bound by ideologies."

The National Post noted in its coverage of the campaign that CAFE's claim was based on a Statistics Canada survey from 2009, which found that roughly similar numbers of men and women experienced spousal violence in Canada. The same survey, the Post noted, had also found that women were twice as likely to be injured by spousal violence, three times more likely to be the victims of serious violence, and seven times more likely to fear for their lives. Responding to the billboard campaign, The Globe and Mail writer Leah McLaren wrote that CAFE's stance on the issue was "beyond ludicrous," suggesting that the group had a "topsy-turvy world view." Responding to the billboard, Todd Minerson of White Ribbon Campaign said that "women are more likely to experience violence in an intimate relationship [by] many, many times," adding that "women are more likely to experience more severe and, in fact, far more likely to experience fatal violence," Social worker Gary Direnfeld was also critical of the billboard. "The way that that is presented is misleading," he said. Acknowledging that "there aren't shelters dedicated to men," Direnfeld suggested that "the need is so disproportionately greater for women that that is where the bulk of the money goes."

Penny Krowitz, who is the executive director of Act to End Violence Against Women was also critical of the billboard. Speaking to the National Post, she said "If we had enough men coming forward saying, 'I need shelter from this abusive woman' or 'I need shelter from this situation,' do you not think that we would have provided those services to men?" and adding that "if service providers were finding that there was such a need for men's shelters, there would be men's shelters,"

In November 2015, CAFE unveiled a second billboard on the theme of fatherlessness and parental alienation. The image showed a girl being pulled out of the loving arms of her father, with the text "I am not parental prey. Help me keep mommy AND daddy."

=== Indigenous Boys and Men ===
CAFE has joined calls for Canada's Inquiry Into Missing and Murdered Indigenous Women to include boys and men, based on the fact that 70% of murdered indigenous people are men. University of Saskatchewan professor Rob Innes has said that, it "might not be the best idea" for those wishing to expand the inquiry to include men to ally with CAFE, because "as men's rights activists do in general—they point towards men being disadvantaged because of feminists." CBC reporter Stephanie Cram, who called CAFE "one of the loudest and most controversial voices in so-called men's rights activism," wrote that the group "undermined" the drive to include men in the inquiry. According to Cram, Trottier's claim that there had already been many inquiries into missing aboriginal women was "simply not true." She also cited a 2016 Statistics Canada report, which found that Indigenous women experience double the rate of violent victimization of Indigenous men.

=== Red Pill film screening ===
In December 2016, CAFE organized a screening of The Red Pill, a documentary film about the men's rights movement directed by Cassie Jaye, at Ottawa's Mayfair theatre. The Mayfair cancelled the screening following community and advertiser complaints that CAFE was spreading hatred and homophobia on campus, and allegations that the group had been dishonest in its Canada Revenue charity status application. According to the Mayfair's co-owner, the cancellation was followed by a "48-hour avalanche of hateful insults," including death threats, from supporters of CAFE and the film. Responding to the intimidation, the theatre's co-owner said "If there was an ounce of 'Oh, I'm sorry guys' before, that went away quickly." The film was later shown at Ottawa's City Hall theatre.
