= Mike Cernovich =

American right-wing commentator and conspiracy theorist (born 1977)

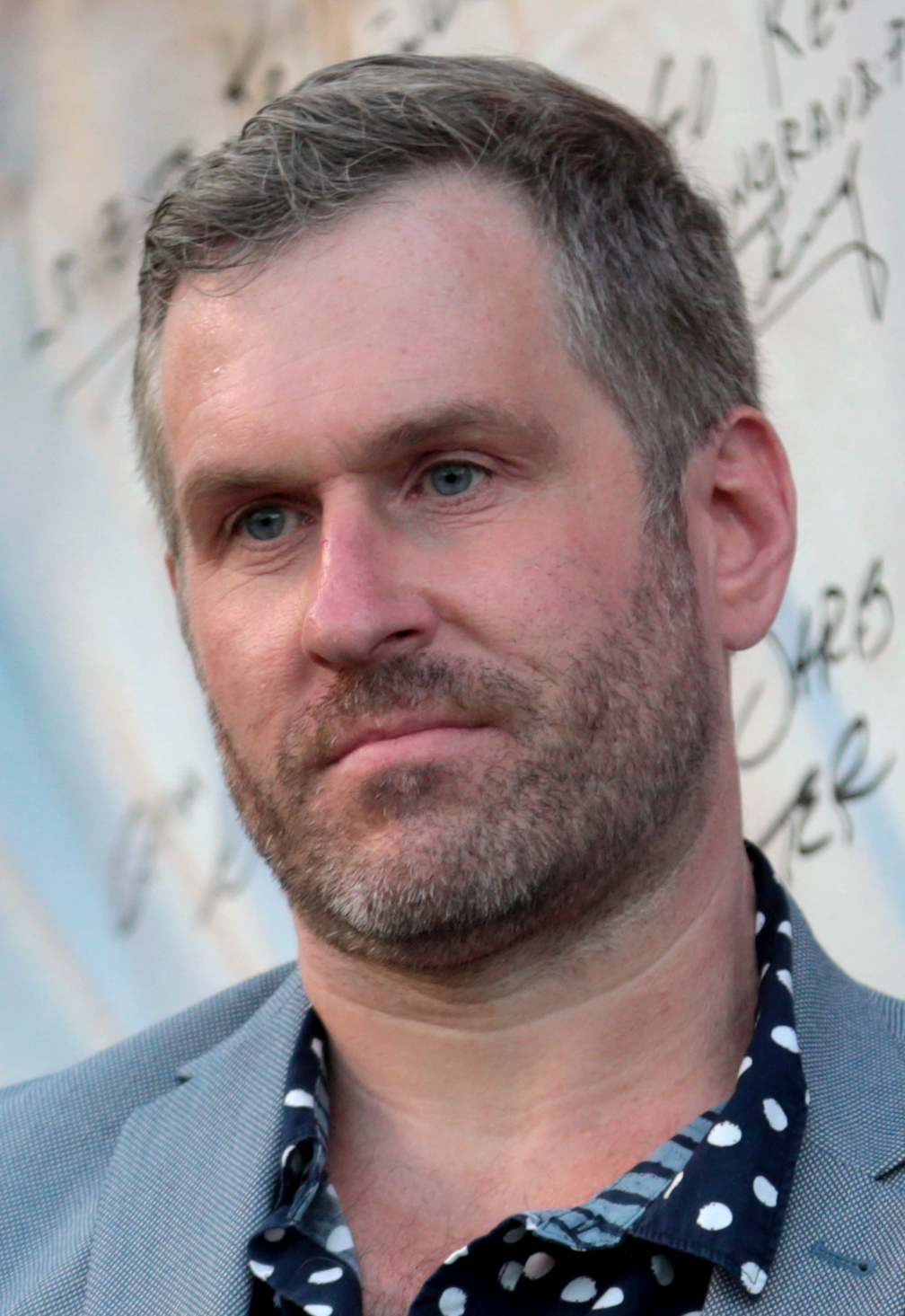
- Cernovich in 2018
- Born: Michael Cernovich; November 17, 1977 (age 48); Kewanee, Illinois, U.S.
- Education: University of Illinois Springfield (BA); Pepperdine University (JD)
- Movement: Manosphere
- Website: cernovich.com

Michael Cernovich (born November 17, 1977) is an American right-wing social media personality and political commentator. Though he initially called himself alt-right, he dissociated from the movement after Richard Spencer became its public face. Cernovich describes himself as part of the new right and some have described him as part of the alt-lite.

Cernovich became a blogger in the 2000s, focusing on anti-feminist themes. He gained notice within the manosphere, and made a number of inflammatory comments about dating and sexual assault, including the claim that date rape is "liberal fiction". He created a website, Danger and Play, in 2011; it was first known for his postings about men's rights and mindset techniques. In 2014, Cernovich became a prominent figure in the Gamergate harassment campaign against several women in the video game industry, and through this built a following among the alt-right. During the 2016 presidential campaign, he adapted his website to a political blog. He was an early supporter of Republican candidate Donald Trump, and promoted conspiracy theories about Democratic candidate Hillary Clinton. Since 2018, he has become increasingly critical of Trump, and in 2022 voiced support for Ron DeSantis instead for the 2024 election.

Cernovich has promoted fake news, conspiracy theories, and smear campaigns. He helped spread the Pizzagate conspiracy theory, which falsely claimed that John Podesta and other high-ranking Democratic Party officials were involved in a child-sex ring. Cernovich has frequently made unsubstantiated accusations about political opponents of being pedophiles.

== Early life ==
Cernovich was born on November 17, 1977, in the farming town of Kewanee, Illinois. His family was poor, and his parents were both devout Christians.

Cernovich graduated with a Bachelor of Arts in philosophy from the University of Illinois at Springfield in 2001. He graduated with a Juris Doctor from Pepperdine University School of Law in 2004.

== Writings and films ==
=== Blogs ===
In 2004, Cernovich started a legal blog entitled Crime & Federalism, where he wrote about law from a libertarian perspective.

Shortly after his divorce in 2011, he created the blog Danger & Play, where he wrote about men's rights, fitness, and self-help topics. The title of Danger & Play came from a quote by Friedrich Nietzsche: "The true man wants two things: danger and play. For that reason he wants woman, as the most dangerous plaything."

In an October 2016 blog post, Cernovich wrote that date rape is "liberal fiction" that is "harmful ... for men and women" and leads to false rape accusations, claiming that: "Lying about being in love to sleep with someone isn't rape [...] Getting played isn't rape. Regret isn't rape. Thinking, 'I might have been date raped,' means you weren't raped." His comments received sustained criticism.

=== Books ===
In 2015, Cernovich self-published Gorilla Mindset: How to Control Your Thoughts and Emotions, Improve Your Health and Fitness, Make More Money and Live Life on Your Terms, which became a bestseller in the motivational self-help category on Amazon.

In 2016, Cernovich published Danger & Play: Essays on Embracing Masculinity. In October 2016, he published MAGA Mindset: Making YOU and America Great Again through Castalia House, a Finnish publishing house founded by Vox Day which primarily publishes science fiction and fantasy.

=== Films ===
In 2016, Cernovich was an associate producer for Cassie Jaye's documentary The Red Pill, which discusses the men's rights movement, and issues like male suicide, child custody, and educational inequality.

In 2018, Cernovich produced a documentary called Hoaxed: Everything They Told You Is a Lie, with associate producers Scooter Downey and Jon Du Toit. The Hollywood Reporter described it as "a right-wing take on corporate malfeasance and media bias". The movie interviewed a wide range of conservative figures, including Anthony Scaramucci, Jordan Peterson, Scott Adams, James O'Keefe, and Alex Jones. Hoaxed was also made into a book of the same name. The documentary was listed on the Amazon platform before being removed without comment in 2020.

== Political activities ==
=== Identification with, and later disavowal of the alt-right ===
Cernovich's writings turned political after Trump announced his candidacy for the 2016 U.S. presidential election. He became notable for his trolling; his maxims were "conflict is attention", and "attention is influence". He identified himself as alt-right, and joined forces with provocateurs like Milo Yiannopoulos. Early on, the alt-right was a "big-tent" that included "any conservative or reactionary who was [...] too belligerently antiestablishment to feel at home in the Republican Party". In November 2016, white nationalist Richard B. Spencer, who also self-identified as alt-right, became its "indelible face" after a video of him giving a Nazi salute provoked universal outrage. This led to a rift in the alt-right movement between white nationalists and civic nationalists, with the former branding the latter "cuckservatives" and "alt-lite". Following the schism, Cernovich disassociated himself from alt-right, saying: "The first order of business is getting that Nazi shit way the fuck away from me". He adopted the label "new right", and has also described himself as an economic nationalist.

Cernovich was one of the organizers of the January 2017 DeploraBall inaugural ball to celebrate Trump's victory; the name was a reference to Hillary Clinton's earlier "basket of deplorables" comment. He banned fellow organizer Baked Alaska after the latter made an antisemitic tweet, and banned Spencer after he discovered the latter had bought a ticket. Notable attendees of the DeploraBall include Martin Shkreli, James O'Keefe, and Cassandra Fairbanks; Peter Thiel also briefly appeared. Outside the ball, there were clashes between Trump supporters and protesters.

=== Ideology ===
In 2015 and 2016, Cernovich repeatedly made false claims that white South Africans were being eliminated in a genocide, which were debunked by Genocide Watch. He later deleted the tweets.

Politico described him in 2016 as wanting an IQ test requirement for immigrants and to end federal funding for universities. Interviewed on 60 Minutes in March 2017, Cernovich advocated single-payer healthcare. Cernovich has supported "some sort of universal basic income", and suggested in 2018 that the "new right" was "more of a populist movement than a conservative or liberal movement", and that "conservatism is on the way out".

=== Donald Trump ===
During the 2016 United States presidential campaign, Cernovich saw Donald Trump as a kindred spirit and, according to Politico, during the 2016 campaign and early period of the Trump administration, Cernovich was an "indefatigable Trump cheerleader" and was among a group of alt-right celebrities who believed they could become a major influence on the Republican Party.

In 2018, Cernovich became "increasingly critical" of Trump, and less politically active. In September 2018, he tweeted his disappointment, "There's no Wall. She's not locked up. But Flynn got fired and sent to wolves. And Saudi Arabia sold weapons of murder. I give zero f-cks about Republicans losing the House." Also in 2018, Cernovich criticized the Trump administration's missile strikes against Syria, which divided the president's political base.

Following the 2022 midterm elections, Cernovich said the losses meant that "at least no one has to suck up to Trump anymore", and that "Trump has zero shot at 2024". He voiced his support for Ron DeSantis for the 2024 election.

=== Attempts to influence the news cycle ===
During the 2016 campaign, Cernovich told journalist Andrew Marantz: "if there's a story that can hurt Hillary, I want it in the news cycle". He set out to coin and promote hashtags that would promote these stories, and aimed to get the stories covered by conservative news aggregator The Drudge Report, saying: "If it's on Drudge, then it's on Hannity. If it's on Hannity, then Brian Stelter's talking about it on CNN". Researchers from Oxford University said in a 2020 book that it exemplifies a propaganda pipeline that "[takes] advantage of the media ecosystem architecture", in which "destructive memes" that emerge from the media's periphery (social media and sites like Infowars) can spread to its core, as mainstream media covers the controversies.

=== Conspiracy theories ===
Politico has described Cernovich as an "avid consumer and progenitor of conspiracy theories".

During the 2016 campaign, Cernovich was "among the first" to spread rumors about Hillary Clinton's health. Clinton had previously experienced a brain concussion and blood clots, but testing found "complete resolution", and her doctors attested to her good health. In March 2016, he claimed that a photo of Hillary Clinton winking showed she had experienced a "mild stroke". In August, he promoted the hashtags: #CoughingHillary and #SickHillary on Twitter, and spread rumors that Clinton had epilepsy and Parkinson's disease. These rumors were amplified by the Drudge Report website, Rudy Giuliani, and Donald Trump. In September 2016, Clinton was filmed collapsing from pneumonia after a memorial service, and Cernovich started the #HillarysHealth hashtag, which trended nationwide; that month, Cernovich's tweets were seen more than 100 million times.

In November 2016, Cernovich and other conspiracists promoted the baseless Pizzagate conspiracy theory, which misinterpreted the leaked Podesta emails to imply that high-ranking Democrats were involved in a child sex-trafficking ring. He also claimed that a 1997 video of Marina Abramovic's "spirit cooking" performance art constituted "occult symbolism" to "openly taunt the public", and that it proved that Clinton's inner circle was part of a sex cult. He helped #Pizzagate become one of the biggest trending hashtags on Twitter; the hashtag drew conspiracy theorists from across the political spectrum, whose common link was their "profound distrust of the mainstream media". The rumors later inspired a gun-wielding man to visit Comet Ping Pong. Cernovich, who had used the hashtag 60 times, later deleted the tweets, and downplayed his involvement in propagating the theory.

Cernovich regularly asserts, without evidence, that there are active child sex rings in Washington, D.C. and in Hollywood. He has accused his opponents of being pedophiles on many occasions. He saw a visit to Haiti by the Clintons as evidence that the couple were involved in child trafficking. In another YouTube video, he said that most people employed by the news media and "every A-list actor" in Hollywood were also pedophiles.

Cernovich has also supported the unevidenced theory that there were multiple shooters at the 2016 Orlando nightclub shooting, which he claims the government is covering up. In 2016, Cernovich worked with Chuck Johnson and Wikileaks to offer a bounty for information supporting the conspiracy theory that murdered DNC staffer Seth Rich had been behind a leak of emails from the Democratic National Committee. In April 2017, Cernovich promoted a conspiracy theory that the Khan Shaykhun chemical attack in Syria was a hoax funded by an American financier.

Cernovich commissioned artist Ben Garrison to draw an antisemitic cartoon portraying Generals H.R. McMaster and David Petraeus being controlled by Jewish puppetmasters- specifically George Soros and the Rothschild Family. Garrison was disinvited from an event at the White House in 2019 following complaints about the cartoon from the Anti-Defamation League.

Cernovich began hosting the fourth hour once a week on conspiracy theorist Alex Jones' InfoWars show in May 2017.

=== Other activities ===
During the 2021 effort to recall incumbent California governor Gavin Newsom, Cernovich floated a potential run.

== Journalism activities ==
Cernovich's high prominence in pro-Trump social media circles led him to build a network of sympathetic sources, and break several stories on his blog, which he promoted on Twitter and video streaming sites like Periscope. The New Yorker's Andrew Marantz described it as "hardly journalism in its highest form. But it's not exactly fake news, either", comparing it to the Huffington Post's citizen journalism.

=== Intelligence unmasking by Susan Rice ===
On April 2, 2017, Cernovich broke the news that Susan Rice, Obama's national security advisor, had requested the unmasking of several Trump transition officials who appeared in intelligence reports. When electronic eavesdropping of foreign officials incidentally capture American citizens' names, those names are redacted in intelligence reports, but can be "unmasked" through a legal process. Cernovich publicized his claims in a Medium.com article, in tweets, and on Periscope live streams. The hashtag #SusanRice became a trending topic on Twitter; he later posted a screenshot showing the tweets received 400,000 impressions. Cernovich claimed that his sources were sympathetic employees of mainstream media outlets, whose outlets were "sitting on this story".

The next day, Bloomberg News published its story on the intelligence unmasking. The White House falsely claimed it was a "smoking gun" that supported its past allegations that Obama had "illegally wiretapped" Trump Tower, though the Susan Rice story was tangential to those claims. Trump himself, conservative commentators Tucker Carlson and David French, White House counselor Kellyanne Conway, and congressmen Rand Paul and Devin Nunes all promoted the story. Donald Trump Jr. claimed Cernovich deserved a Pulitzer Prize. The story was criticized as a distraction from the Russia probe investigating Trump.

The New Yorker's Ryan Lizza said there were "valid reasons" for concerns about unmasking, but that it was constrained by a legal process and independent review, and noted there was no evidence of misconduct. Experts and bipartisan congresspeople concluded Susan Rice was "doing her job", that there was "absolutely" no smoking gun in the unmasked reports, and that the unmaskings were "neither unusual nor against the law".

=== H.R. McMaster ===
In 2017, Cernovich launched a sustained campaign to influence Trump to fire his national security advisor, H. R. McMaster, claiming that McMaster was undermining the president's America First agenda. He started the McMasterLeaks.com website to document his and others' criticisms of McMaster.

On May 8, 2017, Cernovich reported that McMaster had called White House director of strategic communications Hope Hicks a "high schooler". New York Magazine's Olivia Nuzzi later corroborated the quote.

Cernovich was interviewed on Foreign Policy's podcast in relation to his anti-McMaster campaign, and discussed the tension between journalism and activism.

=== Shitty Media Men list ===
On October 12, 2017, Buzzfeed revealed the existence of the "Shitty Media Men" spreadsheet, which had been created a day earlier in the aftermath of the Harvey Weinstein scandal, and was used by female journalists to crowdsource allegations ranging from "weird lunch dates" to rape and stalking committed by their male coworkers. The list included reporters from The New York Times, The Wall Street Journal, The New Yorker, and Buzzfeed.

On October 16, Cernovich offered to pay $10,000 for a copy of the list. He obtained it on October 21, claiming the source "was insistent on not accepting anything", and announced his intent to release it; he published two of the names, but held back the rest after consulting his lawyer. New York Magazine denounced Cernovich's actions as a weaponization of the allegations in order to "attack the hated liberal media". The list itself later led to a string of investigations, resignations and firings.

=== Sexual harassment allegations against John Conyers ===
In November 2017, Cernovich uncovered sworn affidavits in which former staffers accused Democratic congressman John Conyers of sexual harassment. The documents also revealed that the accusers were paid a settlement by Congress's Office of Compliance in exchange for a confidentiality agreement. Cernovich then gave the documents to BuzzFeed, saying he did not publish them on his own because he thought Democrats would attempt to discredit him. BuzzFeed verified that the documents were real, and published their article on November 20, 2017. The House Ethics Committee launched an investigation; other allegations followed, and Conyers resigned in December 2017.

=== Role in the media ecosystem ===
New York Magazine's Jesse Singal said Cernovich benefited from common conservative sentiments that mainstream journalism is "fake news" and "utterly corrupt", sentiments which blur the line between established news organizations and activists, and lead conservatives to downplay or excuse fake news published by "their side". Singal described conservatives as believing "[people like Cernovich] are on the right side, and they're set to overtake those corrupt dinosaurs who have controlled the flow of information for far too long".

In an interview with Vice News, Cernovich claimed he was filling a "vacuum" created by conservative distrust of mainstream media.

The people who are going to watch [this interview] on VICE, or on HBO, are not my people. So you guys could create this caricature of a madman and a monster, and maybe two or three people who follow me on Twitter would even watch it. So we live now in parallel structures. Right now there's no shared set of facts in the country.

— Mike Cernovich, "Post-Truth" News with Mike Cernovich, VICE on HBO

In the same segment, VICE noted that only 32% of Americans trusted the press, and interviewed Eugene Yi of the MIT Media Lab, who showed that mainstream journalists had practically no reach among conservative Twitter users.

== Legal activities ==
=== Jeffrey Epstein lawsuit ===
In 2015, Virginia Giuffre sued Ghislaine Maxwell, alleging that Maxwell sexually trafficked her for Jeffrey Epstein while she was a minor. Maxwell settled the suit.

In January 2017, Cernovich filed a motion to unseal evidence and depositions from Giuffre's lawsuit. He told Politico he was "astonished" by the amount of redactions the judge allowed, with some documents "largely or entirely redacted". Alan Dershowitz later filed a similar motion, and the Miami Herald filed a third in April 2018. The motions were denied by the trial court, and Cernovich and the Herald appealed to the Second Circuit Court of Appeals. The Reporters Committee for Freedom of the Press (which includes the Associated Press) filed an amicus brief to support the appeal. In July 2019, the Court of Appeals ordered the documents unsealed.

=== Other lawsuits ===
In February 2020, Cernovich filed a third-party motion in Roger Stone's criminal case, calling for the release of the jury foreperson's questionnaire answers. This motion too was supported by the Reporters Committee for Freedom of the Press. It was later backed by Roger Stone, who filed a motion for a new trial, which was denied.

== Social media ==
Cernovich became influential on social media, initially as part of the manosphere movement. Cernovich calls his adversaries "beta males", losers, or "cucks", saying: "to beat a person, you lower his or her social status". Cernovich uses trolling tactics, which he says he uses to build his brand rather than for his own amusement. In December 2017, Cernovich hosted an "Ask Me Anything" on Reddit; this was judged a failure by several media outlets.

=== Gamergate ===
In 2014, Cernovich became a prominent figure of Gamergate, which targeted feminists as part of a nascent culture war in the aftermath of the MeToo movement. He encouraged the doxing of opponents, and wrote about women attacking men with false rape allegations. Wired Magazine wrote that Cernovich "gained a kind of leadership over the unruly mob", and that the movement had more to do with identity than with gaming or women.

Cernovich hired private investigators to hound Zoë Quinn, a central target of Gamergate, and worked with Eron Gjoni, Quinn's former boyfriend who had written the disparaging blog post about Quinn which incited the harassment campaign. According to O'Toole et al. writing in Gender Violence, "Cernovich's ongoing strategy, even after Gamergate itself died down, has been to promote conspiracy theories, provide dubious legal advice, and offer a constantly rotating platter of targets." Writer and activist Soraya Chemaly called Gamergate a "breeding ground and practice ground" for the 2016 campaign.

=== Involvement in firings of other individuals ===
==== Sam Seder ====
In December 2017, Cernovich published a Medium post and contacted several journalists and news outlets about a joke tweet that comedian and MSNBC contributor Sam Seder had written in 2009. Cernovich claimed that the tweet, which read "Don't care re Polanski, but I hope if my daughter is ever raped it is by an older truly talented man w/a great sense of mise en scene," proved Seder tacitly endorsed Roman Polanski's sexual abuse crime. MSNBC elected to sever ties with Seder by not renewing his contract (due to expire in February 2018) due to the controversial tweet. Seder defended the tweet by pointing out that, taken in context of the current events around the time he posted it, it was a satirical response to a petition urging Polanski's release from detention in Switzerland because of his stature as an artist, and that he had been mocking Polanski's apologists. After news of the termination broke, Cernovich released a video on Twitter video celebrating his triumph. By then, Seder noted that advertisers on The Majority Report with Sam Seder podcast were also being contacted and pressured by Cernovich and his followers to cut ties with the show over the tweet. In response, Seder launched a GoFundMe campaign to help maintain funding for the show in the face of potential loss of advertising revenue, and also to produce a three-minute video educating people on Cernovich's tactics. According to Seder, Cernovich's ploy had been retribution for Seder's frequent criticism of then-President Donald Trump as well as Republican Alabama Senate candidate Roy Moore. Cernovich retorted to CNN that "the left isn't going to stop going through our tweets so we aren't going to stop going through theirs."

The news of Seder's dismissal prompted an almost immediate backlash. Over 12,000 people signed a petition protesting Seder's termination, arguing that Cernovich had acted in malice and was deliberately mischaracterizing the tweet. AV Club wrote that "MSNBC has now fully bought into that smear campaign ... whose openly stated goal is the destruction of news outlets just like it through the use of blatantly manipulative trolling techniques." Mother Jones rebuked MSNBC for capitulating "to the demands of a lunatic conservative." HuffPost chided that Cernovich was now MSNBC's new "De Facto Ombudsman". MSNBC primetime anchor Chris Hayes tweeted, "The entire culture and our politics are now dominated by people who have weaponized bad faith and shamelessness." There was considerable dissent within MSNBC over Seder's termination. Some employees expressed concerns that his firing would encourage other far-right personalities to launch similar campaigns. A senior MSNBC employee characterized the capitulation as "really weak" and "pathetic". MSNBC's management itself was unsettled by the celebratory reaction from the far-right. On December 7, 2017, MSNBC decided to reverse their decision to terminate Seder's employment.

Cernovich acknowledged that "some are saying Seder was making a joke or being sarcastic." However, he maintained that he didn't misrepresent the tweet and that he had simply "reported on what [Seder] said."

Columbia Journalism Review cited the incident as an example of a broader pattern of far-right media personalities using online smear campaigns to get mainstream journalists fired.

==== James Gunn ====
On July 18, 2018, filmmaker Mark Duplass faced swift backlash on Twitter for recommending his "fellow liberals [cross] the aisle" and follow conservative commentator Ben Shapiro on Twitter; filmmaker James Gunn came to Duplass's defense, and Duplass publicly retracted his endorsement, calling it "a disaster on many levels". A day later, Cernovich and conspiracy theorist Jack Posobiec unearthed tweets by Gunn in which he joked about pedophilia and rape; Gunn had been a vocal critic of Donald Trump, and the tweets were widely shared among conservatives, and trended nationwide on Twitter. The next day, Gunn issued an apology for the tweets. Disney called the tweets "indefensible", and fired Gunn from Guardians of the Galaxy Vol. 3. After Gunn's firing, Cernovich also unearthed similar tweets by comedians Michael Ian Black and Patton Oswalt.

Disney's decision to fire Gunn was criticized by fans of the series, Hollywood stars, and several media outlets. An online petition urging Disney to re-hire Gunn received over 400,000 signatures. Fellow Guardians of the Galaxy cast members released a statement expressing their "[full] support" for Gunn.

In March 2019, Gunn was reinstated by Disney as director of the third film. Prior to his rehiring, he had also signed on with Warner Bros. to write and later direct what would eventually become the DC Extended Universe film The Suicide Squad. In 2022, Gunn was chosen to lead DC Studios, the retooled film division of DC Comics.

== Personal life ==
Cernovich was arrested and charged with rape in 2003. The rape charges were dismissed, but he was ordered to perform community service for misdemeanor battery. His record was later expunged.

Cernovich married his first wife when he was a law student in 2003. He later said the marriage was "ruined by feminist indoctrination". An attorney for a Silicon Valley firm, his first wife earned millions of dollars from an initial public offering (IPO). She filed for divorce in 2011, and Cernovich received what he has described as a "seven-figure sum" in the settlement. He later married his second wife, Shauna. The couple have four children together.

== Works ==
=== Books ===
- Cernovich, Mike (2015). Gorilla Mindset: How to Control Your Thoughts and Emotions, Improve Your Health and Fitness, Make More Money and Live Life on Your Terms. CreateSpace Independent Publishing Platform. ISBN 9781514672112. OCLC 927343429.
- Cernovich, Mike (2016). Danger & Play: Essays on Embracing Masculinity. CreateSpace Independent Publishing Platform. ISBN 9781519652928. OCLC 974812153.
- Cernovich, Mike (2016). Vox Day (ed.). MAGA Mindset: Making YOU and America Great Again. Kouvola, Finland: Castalia House. ISBN 978-952-7065-92-1. OCLC 964446485.
- Downey, Scooter; Du Toit, Jon; Cernovich, Mike (2018). Hoaxed: Everything They Told You Is a Lie. Jonathan Hom. ISBN 9780998490113. OCLC 1080581048.

=== Films ===
Year	Title	Role
2016	The Red Pill	Associate producer
2016	Silenced, Our War for Free Speech	Producer
2019	Hoaxed: The Media's War on Truth	Producer and as self
2020	The Plot Against the President	Self
2020	White Noise	Self
