= Centre for Inquiry Canada =

Not-for-profit educational organization

Centre for Inquiry Canada (CFIC)
- Founded: 2007
- Type: Not-for-Profit Educational Organization
- Location: Ottawa, Ontario, Canada
- Method: Research, education, outreach, and advocacy
- Key people: Current: Gus Lyn-Piluso, Seanna Watson; Former: Kevin Smith, Justin Trottier, Derek Pert, Michael Payton, Eric Adriaans
- Website: centreforinquiry.ca

The Centre for Inquiry Canada (CFIC) is a not-for-profit educational organization with headquarters in Ottawa, Ontario, Canada. The Canadian organization was founded as a member and volunteer driven organization in 2007. It is the Canadian affiliate of CFI Transnational. Their primary mission is to provide education and training to the public in the application of skeptical, secular, rational and humanistic inquiry through conferences, symposia, lectures, published works and the maintenance of a library.

== History ==
CFI Canada was originally established as a branch of CFI Transnational in Toronto, Ontario, Canada, in 2006. Initially supported in part by CFI Transnational, CFIC is an independent Canadian national organization with branches in several provinces. Justin Trottier served as the first National Executive Director from 2007 to 2011, followed by Michael Payton until June 2013, and by Eric Adriaans from March 2014 to July 2016.

== Structure ==
CFI Canada is governed by a Board of Directors to whom the National Executive Director reports. The ancillary Council of CFI Canada is a quasi-governance body responsible for the election of the Board and for approval of changes to CFIC by-laws. Branch directors (leaders) report to the National Executive Director.

=== Branches ===
CFI Canada has branches in Halifax, Montreal, Ottawa, Toronto, Saskatoon, Calgary, Regina, Kelowna, Victoria and Vancouver.

=== Committee for the Advancement of Scientific Skepticism (CASS) ===
The Committee for the Advancement of Scientific Skepticism (CASS) was a science-focused working group of CFI Canada, acting as a national Canadian science advisory group that encouraged evidence-based inquiry into scientific, medical, technological and paranormal claims using scientific scepticism. CASS conducts research, provided educational programs in schools, and published papers on a variety of scientific topics in a proactive approach to public outreach, and also acted reactively to non-evidence based scientific, medical, and paranormal claims in public discourse.

CASS was formed in 2010 to act as point of contact for science outreach for the organization. The committee was a volunteer driven panel of experts and enthusiasts. CASS was run by two co-chairs. Past co-chair members included Iain Martel, a University of Toronto contract lecturer with a background in the metaphysics of physics, Michael Kruse, a contributor to Skeptic North with a background in health. CASS activities were incorporated into the work of the Board of Directors in 2014.

=== Strategic Priorities ===
Drawing on the success of CASS, in 2014, CFIC developed the Committee For the Advancement of Human Rights (CAHR) and the Committee for the Advancement of Education. The three priority areas (human rights, education and science) are championed at CFIC's Board of Directors by the committee Chairs. In 2019, CFIC states that its strategic priorities include secularism, scientific skepticism, critical thinking and building community.

== Campaigns and outreach activities ==
CFI Canada branches host a public education series across the country featuring leading academics, scientists, authors, performers and artists. National campaigns on relevant themes are also a key focus for the organization's activities.

=== Secular library ===
CFIC houses a library of approximately 7000 secular books available for loan to members for research and study purposes. Large portions of the library were in storage from 2011 to 2014 with a repatriation of the full collection occurring in June 2014. The CFIC library was relocated to the Ottawa Branch in 2017.

=== Extraordinary Claims Campaign ===
The Extraordinary Claims Campaign was a series of planned advertisements developed in 2010 based on the Carl Sagan quote "extraordinary claims require extraordinary evidence". It was designed to be a follow-up to the Freethought Association of Canada's Atheist Bus Campaign in 2009. The ads were to feature a list of "extraordinary claims" on topics of pseudoscience, religion, and alternative medicine, including Allah, Christ, Bigfoot, chiropractic, and many more. The campaign also focuses on public education, running a series of events and publishing articles throughout the campaign that explored each extraordinary claim in more detail. The campaign received coverage in The National Post and The Toronto Star. However, as of 2017, these ads never went up.

=== 10:23 ===
CASS takes part in the annual 10:23 campaign, an international campaign aimed at raising awareness about what homeopathy is with the slogan: "There's nothing in it." In cities around the world, individuals get together to take an 'overdose' of homeopathic pills to highlight their dilution and ineffectual nature. In 2011, members of CASS in Vancouver were featured taking their overdose on a CBC Marketplace episode dedicated to homeopathy called: "Cure or Con?"

In March 2011, CASS sent an official complaint to Ontario Health Minister Deb Mathews (Ministry of Health and Long-Term Care), to express concern over a move in the province of Ontario to create a college of homeopaths as a regulated health profession. Key demands have been to ensure that the term "doctor" remain and be enforced as a protected term and to ensure public health safety with particular reference to the promotion of homeopathic vaccines.

=== Public education and events ===
During the Canadian federal election of 2011, CASS sent questionnaires asking candidates their position on public health as it relates to homeopaths and alternative medicine practitioners, scientific integrity and political influence, climate change, and critical thinking education. Responses received were posted publicly.

In the summer of 2011, CASS sent a team of four members to speak on a variety of skeptical science topics at Polaris 25 in Toronto. The panel was the first of its kind at a Canadian science fiction conference and was modelled after Skeptrack at DragonCon in Atlanta.

=== Good Without God Billboard Campaign ===
CFIC launched a Good without God Billboard campaign in 2013 with billboards appearing in Vancouver and Calgary. CFIC also supported a bus ad in Sudbury, Ontario. The campaign featured secular "verses" promoting secular ethics.

=== Kids For Inquiry ===
Kids for Inquiry was launched by the Okanagan Branch of CFIC as a program to bring the values of critical thinking and science education to families with young children.

=== Secular Seminar Series ===
In 2014, CFIC launched its Secular Seminar series as an educational tool targeted to increase awareness and knowledge of targeted topic of Canadian secularism. The first two seminars focused on Prayers in Public Spaces and Canada's Blasphemous Libel law (Criminal Code Section 296). Each seminar is a collaborative participation session where members learn while contributing new content.

=== Criminal Code Section 296: Canada's Blasphemous Libel ===
Following the brutal murders at Charlie Hebdo in France and the imprisonment and torture of Raif Badawi in Saudi Arabia CFIC launched initiatives to educate Canadians regarding Canada's blasphemous libel law, Criminal Code Section 296. Between 2014 and 2017, CFIC called-upon the Canadian government to repeal Criminal Code Section 296 and was a leading organizer of the International Coalition Against Blasphemy Laws (ICABL), a group of organizations from around the world working together to educate and oppose blasphemy laws around the world. The International Humanist and Ethical Union collaborated with ICABL with the End Blasphemy Laws website. Section 296 was repealed in 2018 as part of a larger set of reforms to Canada's criminal code.

=== Bangladeshi writers ===
During a period of turbulence beginning in 2013, there had been a series of killings of writers who were critical of religion in Bangladesh, including the murder of Avijit Roy. In 2015, CFI Canada called on the Canadian government to intervene in the case of Bangladeshi writer Tareq Rahim, whose wife lived in Montreal who was attacked and wounded. Later in that same year, CFI Canada assisted Bangladeshi writer Raihan Abir and his wife to find sanctuary and claim asylum in Canada. Abir had not been attacked, but had feared he was next.

== Affiliate organizations ==
- Center for Inquiry
- Committee for Skeptical Inquiry (CSI)
- 10:23 Campaign
