= James P. Sterba =

American philosopher

James P. Sterba is an American philosopher who specializes in ethics, political philosophy and philosophy of religion. He was the first neo-libertarian.

== Biography ==
Sterba is Professor of Philosophy at the University of Notre Dame. He is a past president of the American Philosophical Association and the North American Society for Social Philosophy. He has authored 35 books.

Sterba is an atheist. His 2019 book, Is a Good God Logically Possible?, is on the problem of evil. Sterba has argued that the God of traditional theism (omnipotent, omnibenevolent and omniscient) is logically incompatible with significant moral evil, hence no such God exists.

== Personal life ==
Sterba is married to Janet Kourany, who is also a professor of philosophy at Notre Dame. They have a daughter named Sonya who is a professor of psychology and human development at Vanderbilt University in Nashville, Tennessee.

== Selected publications ==
- The Demands of Justice (University of Notre Dame Press, 1980)
- Justice for Here and Now (Cambridge University Press, 1998)
- Three Challenges to Ethics: Environmentalism, Feminism, and Multiculturalism (Oxford University Press, 2000)
- Terrorism and International Justice (Oxford University Press, 2003)
- The Triumph of Practice Over Theory in Ethics (Oxford University Press, 2005)
- Does Feminism Discriminate Against Men?: A Debate (with Warren Farrell and Steven Svoboda) (Oxford University Press, 2007)
- From Rationality to Equality (Oxford University Press, 2013)
- The Pursuit of Justice: A Personal Philosophical History (Rowman & Littlefield Publishers, 2014)
- Affirmative Action for the Future (Cornell University Press, 2009)
- Is a Good God Logically Possible? (Palgrave Macmillan, 2019)
- What is Ethics? (Wiley, 2019)
