= Blasphemy Day =

Unofficial observance

- Observed by: Various countries; mostly European and North American ones; none officially
- Type: Cultural
- Significance: A day celebrating blasphemy (as defined in the various national, state or religious laws).
- Date: 30 September
- Next time: 30 September 2027
- Frequency: Annual

Blasphemy Day, also known as International Blasphemy Day or International Blasphemy Rights Day, encourages people to vocally criticize or express outright contempt for religion. Blasphemy Day was introduced as a worldwide celebration by the Center for Inquiry in 2009.

== Origins ==
Blasphemy Day is celebrated on September 30 to coincide with the anniversary of the 2005 publication of satirical drawings of Muhammad in one of Denmark's newspapers, resulting in the Jyllands-Posten Muhammad cartoons controversy. Although the caricatures of Muhammad caused some controversy within Denmark, especially among Muslims, it became a widespread furor after Muslim imams in several countries stirred up violent protests in which Danish embassies were firebombed and over 100 people were killed (including protesters shot by police). The idea to observe an International Blasphemy Rights Day originated in 2009. A student contacted the Center for Inquiry in Amherst, New York, to present the idea, which CFI then supported. Events worldwide on the first annual Blasphemy Day in 2009 included an art exhibit in Washington, D.C., and a free speech festival in Los Angeles.

== Intent ==
Ex-Muslims tearing apart Quranic verses with on Blasphemy Day 2018

During the first celebration of Blasphemy Day in 2009, Center for Inquiry President and CEO Ronald A. Lindsay stated in an interview with CNN: "[W]e think religious beliefs should be subject to examination and criticism just as political beliefs are, but we have a taboo on religion." According to USA Today's interview with Justin Trottier, a Toronto coordinator of Blasphemy Day, "We're not seeking to offend, but if in the course of dialogue and debate, people become offended, that's not an issue for us. There is no human right not to be offended."

== See also ==
- Antitheism
- Antireligion
- New Atheism
