= Neo-libertarianism =

Political ideology

Neo-libertarianism or Neolibertarianism is a political and social philosophy that combines "the libertarian's moral commitment to negative liberty with a procedure that selects principles for restricting liberty on the basis of a unanimous agreement in which everyone's particular interests receive a fair hearing."

Neo-libertarianism has its roots at least as far back as 1980 when it was first described by James Sterba of the University of Notre Dame. Sterba observed that libertarianism advocates for a government that does no more than protection against force, fraud, theft, enforcement of contracts and other "negative liberties" as contrasted with "positive liberties" by Isaiah Berlin. He contrasted this with the older libertarian ideal of a "night watchman state” or “minarchism”.

Sterba held that it is "obviously impossible for everyone in society to be guaranteed complete liberty as defined by this ideal: after all, people's actual wants as well as their conceivable wants can come into serious conflict. [...] It is also impossible for everyone in society to be completely free from the interference of other persons". In 2013, Sterba wrote:

I shall show that moral commitment to an ideal of "negative" liberty, which does not lead to a night-watchman state, but instead requires sufficient government to provide each person in society with the relatively high minimum of liberty that persons using Rawls' decision procedure would select. The political program actually justified by an ideal of negative liberty I shall call Neo-Libertarianism.

Neo-libertarians also advocate for european federalism. Later there was a Manifesto written about it, and also other works.

The concept of neolibertarianism gained a small following in the mid-2000s among right-leaning commentators who distinguished themselves from neoconservatives by their support for individual liberties and from libertarians by their support for foreign interventionism.
