= Lorne Trottier =

Canadian businessman (born 1948)

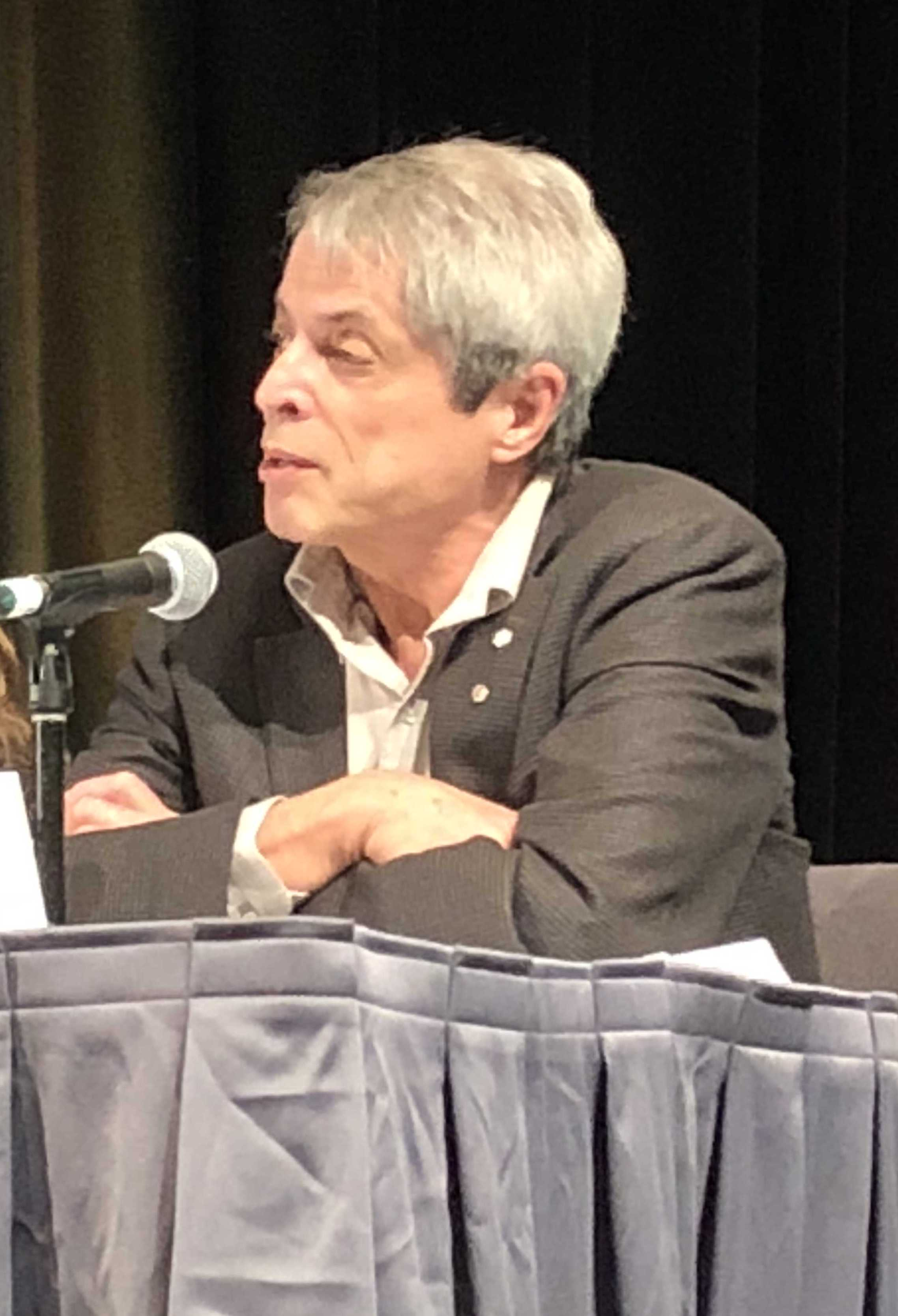
- Lorne Trottier at the 2018 Trottier Public Science Symposium
- Born: Lorne Trottier; 15 June 1948 (age 78); Montreal, Quebec
- Education: Masters of Engineering, Bachelor of Engineering, Electrical Engineering (1970)
- Alma mater: McGill University
- Relatives: Justin Trottier (nephew)

Lorne M. Trottier, OC (born 15 June 1948) is a Canadian engineer, businessman and philanthropist. He co-founded Matrox, a computer corporation that specializes in computer graphics. Trottier sits as an advisor to Canada's Ecofiscal Commission.

== Early life and education ==
Lorne Trottier was born in Montreal, Quebec, to a Franco-Ontarian father and a Jewish mother. He graduated from Baron Byng High School and thereafter received a Bachelor of Engineering in Electrical Engineering in 1970 and a Masters of Engineering in the same field in 1973 both from McGill University.

He has had a lifelong interest in science.

== Philanthropy ==
Trottier has repeatedly made significant donations to his alma mater McGill. In 2000 his gift of $10 million funded construction of the Lorne M. Trottier Building, home to the Department of Electrical and Computer Engineering and the School of Computer Science. In 2006 his second gift of $12 million created two Lorne Trottier Chairs at the school, one in Aerospace Engineering and the other in Astrophysics and Cosmology. In 2012 he donated $15 million to the university to create both the Trottier Institute for Sustainability in Engineering and Design and endow the Trottier Institute for Science and Public Policy. Trottier is believed to be the largest donor to the Faculty of Science at McGill.

Beginning in 2005 the Lorne Trottier Public Science Symposium has been held in the fall of each year, featuring eminent scientists from throughout the world speaking on topics of interest to the public. The first one was held 24 November 2005 and focused on climate change. In November 2011 Trottier gave $5.5 million to make the Symposium permanent and to fund Joseph A. Schwarcz's McGill's Office for Science and Society to educate the public about quackery and to "battle against charlatans." It is believed to be the largest single gift for science promotion in Canada.

He has also supported Polytechnique Montréal, Montréal Science Centre, John Abbott College, the Lakeshore General Hospital and the West Island Palliative Care Residence with donations.

He is a member of the board of directors of the National Center for Science Education. From 2010 to 2011 he was also on the board of directors of CFI Canada.

The Trottier Observatory at Simon Fraser University, open April 2015, is primarily funded by a $2.7 million gift from The Trottier Family Foundation.

On 21 November 2022, the Trottier Family Foundation donated Can$26 million to fund space research at McGill University and the Université de Montréal. In recognition, the McGill Space Institute was renamed the Trottier Space Institute at McGill University.

== Awards ==
- Réseau Action TI, "Les grands bâtisseurs des TIC du Québec" (2003)
- Prix Lionel-Boulet (2003)
- Honorary Doctorate of Science, McGill University (2006)
- Member of the Order of Canada (2007), later promoted to Officer (2016).
- Honorary Doctorate of Science, École Polytechnique de Montréal (2011)
- NCSE Friend of the Planet Award (2024)
