= Justin Trottier =

Canadian political activist

- Born: Justin Trottier; 4 December 1982 (age 43); Montreal, Quebec, Canada
- Education: Bachelor of Applied Science, Engineering
- Alma mater: University of Toronto
- Occupation: executive director
- Years active: 2002-present
- Organization(s): Canadian Association for Equality (CAFE), Canadian Centre for Men and Families
- Relatives: Lorne Trottier

Justin Trottier (born 4 December 1982) is a political activist, former political candidate and founder of Canada's largest social-political movements for secularism and men's issues. He was one of several founding members of several secular organizations such as the Centre for Inquiry Canada in 2007, where he served as National Executive Director until 2011. He also founded the Freethought Association of Canada, which created the 2009 atheist bus campaign where Trottier served as one of the spokespersons. He also founded the Canadian Secular Alliance. In 2011, he was a Green Party candidate in the 2011 Ontario provincial election. Later, Trottier co-founded and has served as the chairman and spokesperson for the Canadian Association for Equality (CAFE), and was heavily involved in CAFE's campaign to open the Canadian Centre for Men and Families in 2014. He currently serves as the Centre's director.

== Biography ==
Trottier graduated from the University of Toronto with a degree in Engineering Science in 2006. His uncle, Lorne Trottier, is the co-founder of Matrox computing.

In 2005, Trottier joined the board of directors of the Canadian Space Society and had served as the society's external director and as the managing editor of its publication, the Canadian Space Gazette. In 2012 Trottier became the executive producer and host of the Star Spot Radio Show and podcast. The program is aired on CJRU The Scope at Ryerson University.

=== Political career ===
In 2011, Trottier became the Green Party of Ontario candidate in Parkdale—High Park in the 2011 Ontario general election. Trottier placed fourth in the election with 3.33% of the vote. New Democratic Party candidate Cheri DiNovo, who was the incumbent, kept her seat.

== Organizations ==
In 2005 Trottier founded the University of Toronto Secular Alliance with Jennie Fiddes. The organization successfully lobbied for the secularization of the University of Toronto's graduation ceremony through the removal of convocation prayers. Then in March 2006, Trottier opened the Secular Freethought Centre, the first community centre in Canada for secular humanists. By January 2007 the Secular Freethought Centre had become the Centre for Inquiry Canada (CFI) and Trottier was hired as its first Executive Director. CFI currently operates 10 branches in Canada as a national educational charity. Until 2011, Trottier served as chief spokesperson and led the national office.

In June 2010, Trottier hired Nathan Phelps, the estranged son of Pastor Fred Phelps of the notoriously anti-gay Westboro Baptist Church, to head up the Calgary, Alberta, branch of the Centre for Inquiry. Trottier's Canadian Campaign for Free Expression sparked the Centre for Inquiry's annual Blasphemy Day.

Trottier co-founded the One School System Network which advocates for the defunding of the tax-payer supported Roman Catholic School System in Ontario. The One School System Network lobbied against the Conservative Party leader John Tory's 2007 election campaign proposal to fund all private faith-based schools in Ontario fully.

In June 2014 he filed an affidavit and was granted intervenor status by the Supreme Court of Canada on behalf of the Canadian Secular Alliance, in the case of Mouvement laïque québécois v Saguenay, a Supreme Court of Canada case looking at the constitutionality of government prayer. Atheist Alain Simoneau and the secular rights organization Mouvement Laïque Québécois had initiated an action before the Quebec Human Rights Tribunal (Commission des droits de la personne et des droits de la jeunesse) against Jean Tremblay, Mayor of the Quebec town of Saguenay, calling for an end to the practice of the municipal council initiating its city council meetings with a Catholic prayer, on the basis that doing so infringes on freedom of conscience and religion. The Supreme Court unanimously agreed with the plaintiffs, and ordered an end to the practice.

=== Atheist bus campaign ===
Trottier is the founder and former president of the Freethought Association of Canada. During his leadership he acted as one of the primary spokespersons for the 2009 Canadian Atheist Bus Campaign, which received considerable media attention. The campaign ran atheist ads on public transit vehicles in multiple Canadian cities. A variety of cities refused to run the ads, although some withdrew their prohibition after a Supreme Court ruling found banning political or controversial ads a violation of the free speech provision in the Canadian constitution.

The Canadian Atheist bus ads sparked counter campaigns in response, which Trottier publicly supported, including an ad sponsored by Syed Sohawardy of the Islamic Supreme Council of Canada and another by the United Church of Canada.

=== Gender issues ===
In 2011, Trottier became the leader of the Toronto Men's Issues Awareness Campaign. In an interview with the Toronto Star about the campaign, Trottier stated that "in gender issues, it’s not as simple as women are always victims and men are always the victimizers," and that "there’s a far more nuanced debate that we should be having." Describing the campaign as "about equality and equalism," Trottier suggested that "for all our talk of equality, it’s ironic that our societal investments have really been on women’s issues."

Trottier co-founded, and currently acts as chair and spokesperson for the Canadian Association for Equality (CAFE). CAFE has often been described in the media as being a men's rights group, and has frequently been the subject of controversy.

In 2013, CAFE announced plans to build Toronto's first "Men's Centre," to be named the Canadian Centre for Men and Families. Trottier was involved in CAFE's campaign to raise funds for and open the Canadian Centre for Men and Families, and he now serves as the Centre's director. Trottier has described the centre as a "hub for men’s and boy’s issues and for the health and well-being of boys more generally," but it has also faced criticism from feminist and anti-domestic violence organizations such as the Toronto YWCA and the White Ribbon Campaign. The centre opened in downtown Toronto in August 2014, with programs including grief counseling, sexual trauma support, anger management, suicide prevention, fathering, tutoring and mentorship.

== Media work ==
Trottier has made many media appearances, representing various atheist, men's issues, and political groups. In 2010 Trottier was the skeptical voice on the pilot episode of The Conspiracy Show with Richard Syrett, airing on VisionTV. He subsequently became a regular guest, speaking on crop circles, the Shroud of Turin and freemasonry. He has also been featured on the cover of Eye Weekly magazine, and been interviewed for Vision TV's two-part documentary "Godless."

Since January 2011, Trottier has appeared regularly on the John Oakley Show's Tuesday morning Culture War segment on Toronto Talk Radio AM640. His debate opponents have tended to be conservative religious leaders, including Reverend Charles McVety, Pastor Scott Masson, and Rabbi Mendel Kaplan. In April 2009, he was invited to become a contributor to the National Post's online Holy Post blog.
