= Smith & Wesson Model 30 =

- Type: Revolver
- Place of origin: United States

Production history
- Manufacturer: Smith & Wesson
- Produced: 1903–1976

Specifications
- Length: 8 inches (200 mm) with 4 in (100 mm) barrel
- Barrel length: 2 inches (51 mm); 3 inches (76 mm); 4 inches (100 mm); 6 inches (150 mm)
- Cartridge: .32 S&W Long; .32 S&W
- Action: Double-action
- Feed system: Six round cylinder
- Sights: Fixed

The Smith & Wesson Model 30 is a small-frame, six-shot, double-action revolver chambered for the .32 S&W Long cartridge. It was based on the Smith & Wesson Hand Ejector Third Model and was finished at the factory with a blued or nickel finish. It was a "round butt" I-frame and was produced from 1948 to 1960 and was replaced by the J-frame Model 30–1, which remained in production until 1976.

== History ==
From 1948 to 1957, this model was known as the "Model .32 Hand Ejector" and was built on the 5-screw I-Frame. In 1958 the frame was redesigned to use four screws and a coiled mainspring as opposed to a flat or leaf spring and called the "Improved I-Frame". Three years later in 1961, the "I-Frame" was discontinued and the slightly longer 3-screw "J-Frame" replaced it.

== Variants ==
A square-butt version first known as the "Model .32 Regulation Police" was made during the same time period as the "Model .32 Hand Ejector" and was eventually replaced by the Model 31 in 1958. The Model 31 followed the same path as the Model 30 with regard to production dates.
