= Katherine K. Young =

Canadian religious studies professor

Katherine K. Young is a Canadian religious studies professor at McGill University. Originally a scholar of Hinduism, in later life her interests turned to the topic of misandry, fighting against feminism. She and conservative activist theologian Paul Nathanson have co-authored four books on misandry. Young and Nathanson joined theologian Margaret Somerville to testify against gay marriage in the case Varnum v. Brien, but the Iowa Supreme Court rejected their statements, saying they had an "absence of expertise in sociology, child development, psychology, or psychiatry."

== Life ==
She was awarded her M.A. from the University of Chicago and her Ph.D. from McGill University, for research on the history of religions, specializing in Hinduism. After completing her doctorate Young remained at McGill as a faculty member where she continues to teach.

== Publications ==
=== Series ===
- with Paul Nathanson. Spreading Misandry. : McGill-Queen's University Press, 2001.
- with Paul Nathanson. Legalizing Misandry. : McGill-Queen's University Press, 2006.
- with Paul Nathanson. Sanctifying Misandry: Goddess Ideology and the Fall of Man. : McGill-Queen's University Press, 2010.
- with Paul Nathanson. Replacing Misandry: A Revolutionary History of Men. : McGill-Queen's University Press, 2015.

=== Monographs ===
- with Harold G. Coward and Julius J. Lipner. Hindu Ethics: Purity, Abortion, and Euthanasia. Albany, New York: State University of New York Press, 1988.

=== Articles ===
- 'Women in Hinduism'. In Today's Woman in World Religions. Albany, New York: State University of New York Press, 1994. Pages 77–136.
- 'World Religions: A Category in the Making?' Chapter 11 in Michael Despland and Gérard Vallée (editors). Religion in History: The Word, the Idea, the Reality. :,1992.
- 'Hinduism'. In Encyclopedia of Feminist Theories. London: Routledge, 2000. Pages 248–249.
- Review of Transdisciplinarity: Recreating Integrated Knowledge. In Encyclopedia of Life Support Systems. Oxford: UNESCO, 2000.

=== Editor ===
- General editor of the McGill Studies in the History of Religions series.
- Co-editor with David E. Guinn and Chris Barrigar (editors). Religion and Law in the Global Village. Atlanta: Scholars Press, 2000.
- Co-editor with Arvind Sharma. Feminism and World Religions. Albany, New York: State University of New York Press, 1998.
- Co-editor with Arvind Sharma. Her Voice, Her Faith: Women Speak On World Religions. Boulder, Colorado: Westview Press, 2002.

== See also ==
- Women in Hinduism
