= Cassie Jaye =

American film director

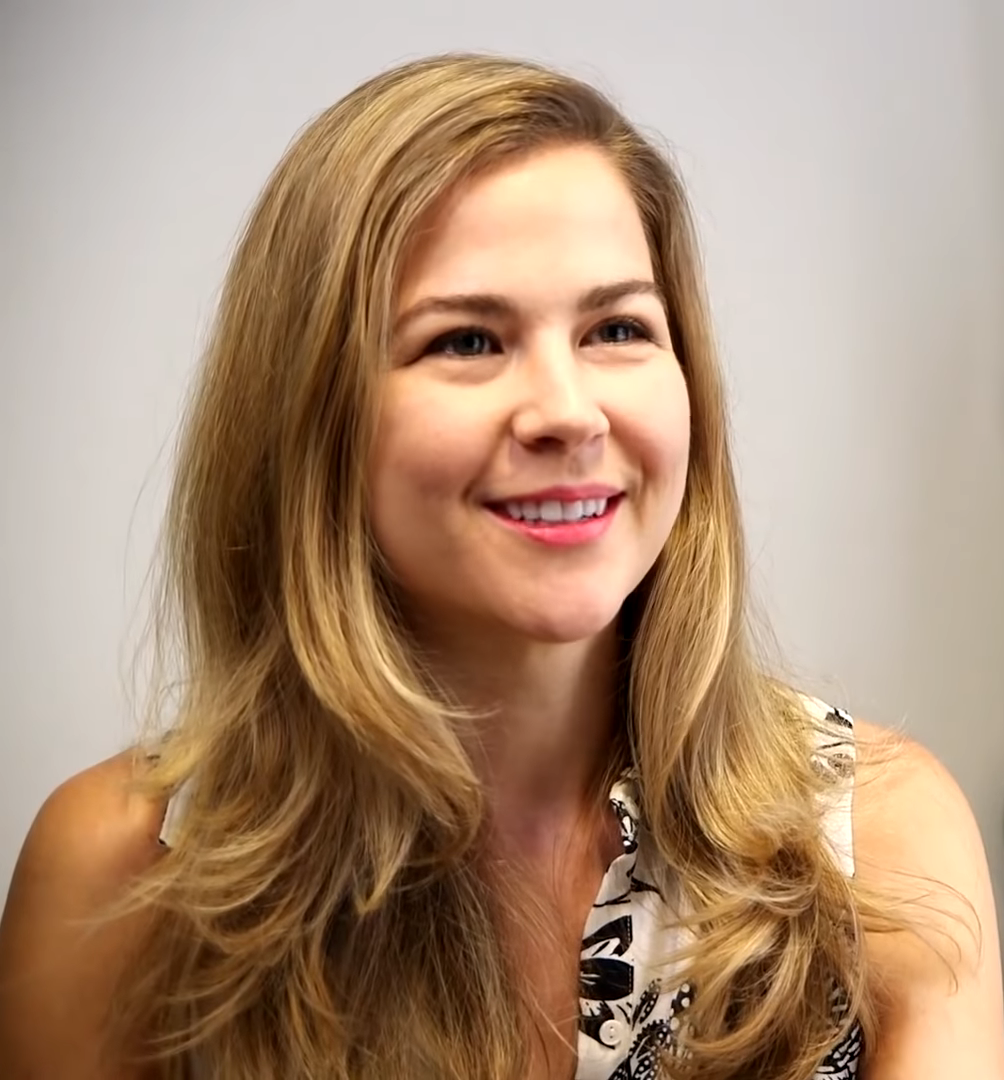
- Jaye in 2018
- Born: Cassandra Nelson; May 1, 1986 (age 40); Fort Sill, Oklahoma, U.S.
- Occupations: Film director, producer
- Years active: 2004–present
- Notable work: The Red Pill
- Spouse: Evan Davies (m. 2018)
- Website: jayebirdproductions.com

Cassie Jaye (born May 1, 1986) is an American film director, best known for directing the 2016 documentary film The Red Pill about the men's rights movement.

== Early life and work ==
Jaye was born in Fort Sill, Oklahoma, to Nena Jaye. When she was aged 6, her parents divorced. When she was 14, Jaye moved to Las Vegas, where she attended Palo Verde High School.

At age 18, she moved to Los Angeles, where she was an actress for five years before moving to Marin County, California in 2008. Jaye disliked the stereotypical roles she was cast in, which she described as "cute girl-next-door who always died in horror films." Along with several incidents of sexual harassment, this led her to embrace feminism.

== Documentary career ==
After leaving the acting field, Jaye stayed in films, but as a documentary producer, director, and editor. She formed Jaye Bird Productions, a film production company, in 2008. Her mother is her production partner.

=== Daddy I Do (2010) ===
Jaye directed and produced the 2010 American documentary film Daddy I Do which examines sex education and sexual abstinence programs in the United States. Daddy I Do includes interviews with the founder of the Silver Ring Thing Denny Pattyn, feminist writer Amanda Marcotte, and Douglas Kirby. The film discusses personal stories from women facing teenage pregnancy, single motherhood, abortion and sexual assault. Bust magazine praised "Jaye for exposing the truth about abstinence-only programs, the stories of teenagers who buy into it, and its consequences".

In December 2018, Jaye published Daddy I Do on her channel on YouTube.

=== The Right to Love: An American Family (2012) ===
Jaye directed and produced her second feature documentary film The Right to Love: An American Family in 2012. The film chronicles a family known as "Gay Family Values" on YouTube in the aftermath of 2008 California Proposition 8.

The film premiered in February 2012 at the Castro Theatre in San Francisco with guest speaker Zach Wahls. The film was screened at the Frameline Film Festival.

In December 2018, Jaye published The Right to Love on her channel on YouTube.

=== The Red Pill (2016) ===
Jaye directed and produced the 2016 American documentary film The Red Pill about the men's rights movement. Jaye spent a year interviewing men's rights figures, such as Paul Elam, founder of A Voice for Men; Harry Crouch, president of the National Coalition for Men; Warren Farrell, author of The Myth of Male Power; and Erin Pizzey, who started the first domestic violence shelter for men in the modern world. She interviewed critics of the movement, such as Ms. magazine executive editor Katherine Spillar, and sociologist Michael Kimmel.

Jaye initially relied on her own money to fund the film, as well as that from her mother and her boyfriend, as she found difficulty finding backers from traditional sources after it became known that the film would take a "balanced approach" view of the men's rights movement. In what she called a "last resort", she started a campaign on the crowdfunding platform Kickstarter. The Kickstarter project promised to be a "fair and balanced" look at the men's rights movement. She received support from Breitbart News columnist Milo Yiannopoulos.

At the end of the film, Jaye states that she no longer identifies as a feminist, saying that she now believes that "feminism is not the road to gender equality". Although she no longer calls herself a feminist, she has stated that she is "still an advocate of women's rights and always will be" but is now "adding men to the discussion."

Jaye gave a TEDx speech about her experience making The Red Pill. It focused particularly on how the process initially affirmed her feminist sense of otherism and outrage against the men's rights movement, but then later broke it down. It was an "uncomfortable and humbling experience", and one that turned her "from feminism to gender equality activism".

In 2019, Jaye said that the video diaries she recorded during filming allowed her to remember what her views on feminism were before she started working on the film, and why she thought that way. Looking back on the diaries, she could see that her previous views weren't necessarily malicious, but just uninformed.

==== Criticisms and backlash ====
Jaye's effort for the Kickstarter project was strongly criticized by some feminists including David Futrelle, who runs a website called We Hunted the Mammoth and who said it looked like propaganda. The film had screenings canceled in Australia following petitions, protests, and threats against those holding the screening.

David Futrelle accused Jaye of soliciting funding from members of the men's rights movement, which she portrays sympathetically. She has said that the suggestion the film was funded by MRAs (men's rights activists) is "a common lie that keeps spreading," and that the film's backers and producers would have no influence or control of the film. It has also been criticized by Alan Scherstuhl of The Village Voice, among others, for failing to challenge controversial comments and behavior from men's rights figures such as Elam. Jaye has defended the film as being "extremely balanced" and that people were "heard in context without manipulation".

In a 2017 interview with Australian TV show The Project, when Carrie Bickmore asked her about a recent high-profile murder of Luke Batty by his father, Jaye emphasized that it was a specific example of a male victim of domestic abuse, where Waleed Aly tersely rebuts, "that's the lesson you took from that?" (from the murder). Jaye responded that "we have to distinguish between victims and perpetrators, or criminals, because a boy who is being abused by a parental figure, that is a boy that deserves care and compassion and resources if he needs to find help." Jaye described the interview as "hostile and aggressive", and initially pulled out of some interviews following the incident. Later she resumed interviews but made her own recording of the discussions, as she stated she had been "misquoted so much".

In an interview on the Australian TV show Weekend Sunrise, Jaye asked the show's hosts Andrew O'Keefe and Monique Wright directly "Did you see the film?". The co-hosts said they had not. After receiving a wave of comments critical of the hosts and supporting Jaye, Sunrise removed the video of the interview from their Facebook page. Jaye uploaded the interview to her own page, where it was removed shortly after as a copyright violation. When asked about the removal from Facebook a spokeswoman for the Seven network which produces Sunrise declined to comment. Jaye also posted screenshots of emails to prove that Sunrise's producer had received a copy of the film a month before the interview and plenty of time for the hosts to have watched it. This was to disprove the hosts' claim that they did not receive a copy of the film.

== Filmography ==
- Daddy I Do (2010)
- The Right to Love: An American Family (2012)
- The Red Pill (2016)

== Awards ==
- 2010, "Best Documentary" – Daddy I Do Action On Film International Film Festival
- 2010, "Best Documentary" – Daddy I Do, Idyllwild International Festival of Cinema
- 2010, "Best Docu-Drama" – Daddy I Do, Bare Bones International Film Festival
- 2012, "Best Social Commentary Award", The Right to Love: An American Family, Action On Film International Film Festival
- 2012, "Grand Jury Award" – The Right to Love: An American Family, Bare Bones International Film Festival
- 2017, "Best Documentary Feature" – The Red Pill, Louisiana International Film Festival
- 2017, "Best of Festival", "Excellence In Producing A Documentary", and "Excellence In Directing Documentary" – The Red Pill, Idyllwild International Festival of Cinema
- 2017, "Women In Film" – The Red Pill, Digital Hollywood DigiFest Film Festival

== Personal life ==
Cassie Jaye and Evan Davies married in June 2018. Davies worked as director of photography on The Red Pill.

In September 2018, Jaye discovered that she was pregnant, but then miscarried about a month later. She recorded the events of her pregnancy and miscarriage in footage code-named Robin, the name she gave to the miscarried baby. She has given consideration to produce a documentary project based on that footage, which would be named, Waiting to Miscarry.

== See also ==
- The Red Pill
- Karen DeCrow
- Wendy McElroy
- Camile Paglia
