= Warren Farrell =

American author, spokesperson, and political candidate

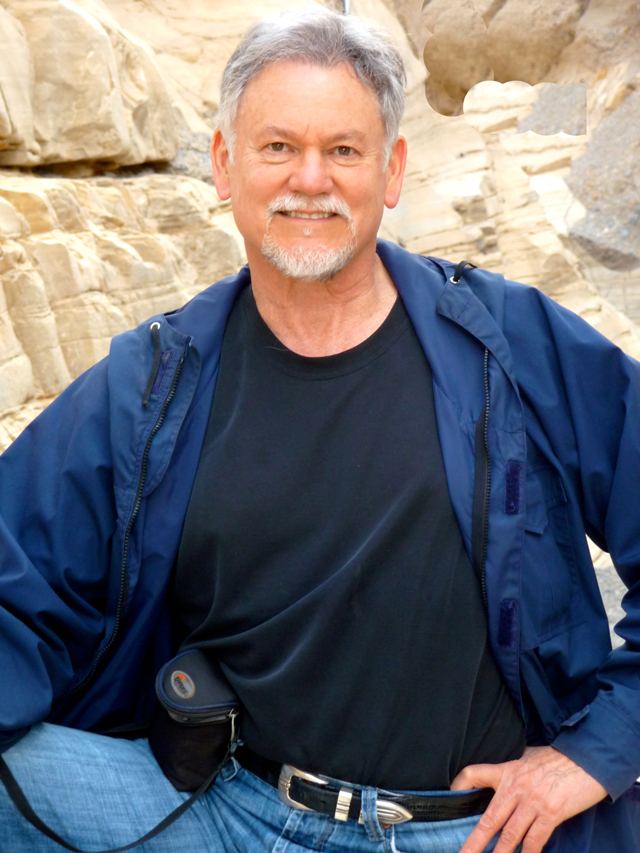
- Born: Warren Thomas Farrell; June 26, 1943 (age 83)
- Education: Montclair State University (BA); UCLA (MA); NYU (PhD)
- Occupation: Author
- Spouse(s): Ursula Farrell (divorced); Liz Dowling (2002–present)
- Children: 2 stepdaughters
- Writing career
- Period: Contemporary
- Genres: Psychological, social, political
- Subjects: Men's/women's/fathers' issues, gender, couples' communication, child custody, boy crisis
- Movements: women's movement men's movement fathers' movement
- Website: warrenfarrell.com

Warren Thomas Farrell (born June 26, 1943) is an American author, educator, and activist who has written about gender, particularly men's issues. Initially active in the second wave feminist movement of the late 1960s and 1970s, Farrell was a board member of the National Organization for Women in New York City and authored The Liberated Man (1974), which explored how traditional gender roles constrained both men and women. He obtained his doctorate in political science on the topic in 1974. His role-reversal workshops in the 1970s and early 1980s brought him mainstream attention. Over time, he grew critical of feminism and shifted his focus toward highlighting the disadvantages and challenges faced by men.

In the 1980s and 1990s, Farrell established himself as a leading voice in the emerging men's movement. His books Why Men Are the Way They Are (1986) and The Myth of Male Power (1993) argued that men are systematically disadvantaged in areas such as family law, education, health, and cultural representation. Farrell contended that men, often seen as "success objects," bore hidden costs of traditional masculinity, from hazardous work to military conscription, while facing rising cultural hostility. These writings were widely reviewed and translated.

Farrell's later books and talks broadened into broader relationship advice and advocacy on men's issues. Women Can't Hear What Men Don't Say (1999) and Father and Child Reunion (2001) addressed communication and parenting, with Farrell calling for greater recognition of fathers as caregivers. His subsequent books, including Why Men Earn More (2005) and Does Feminism Discriminate Against Men? (2008, with James P. Sterba), continued to argue that pay disparities and gender inequalities were rooted more in life choices and systemic biases against men than in widespread discrimination against women. In The Boy Crisis (2018, with John Gray), he emphasized the effects of father absence on boys' health, education, and well-being. His most recent work, Role Mate to Soul Mate (2024), extends his focus to couples' communication and conflict resolution.

Farrell and his work have regularly been featured at fora associated with the men's rights movement, including conferences, websites, podcasts and he is often described as the intellectual father of the movement. Farrell himself denies the activist label. His work, on gender and his abandoned research on incest have sparked interest, praise, criticism and controversy. Farrell has remained a prominent public speaker and commentator, advocating for what he describes as genuine gender equality by addressing the overlooked disadvantages faced by men and boys.

== Early life and education ==
Farrell was born on June 26, 1943. He is the eldest of three children born to an accountant father and a mother who struggled with her role as a housewife. His mother suffered from depression, particularly when she was not working, and died age 48 after a fall. He grew up in New Jersey, but spent time in Europe as a teenager, which taught him to challenge orthodoxies and to listen to others. Farrell graduated from Midland Park High School in Midland Park, New Jersey in 1961.

Farrell received a B.A. degree in social sciences from Montclair State University in 1965. As a college student, Farrell was a national vice-president of the Student-National Education Association, leading President Lyndon B. Johnson to invite him to the White House Conference on Education.

When he was a junior, Farrell met his first wife Ursula ("Ursie") at a convention. He encouraged her to speak up as she had stage fright, and the couple married in 1966. The same year, he received an M.A. in political science from the University of California, Los Angeles.

Farrell obtained a Ph.D. degree, also in political science, from the New York University Graduate School of Arts and Science in 1974; his dissertation topic was "The political potential of the women's liberation movement as indicated by its effectiveness in changing men's attitude".

== Feminist years ==
The Farrells' marriage began with the couple following traditional gender roles. Ursula worked but did most of the domestic tasks. Farrell, in contrast, focused on developing his career as quickly as possible so he could be the main breadwinner when they had children. A mathematician and IBM executive, Ursula enjoyed working, and offered to provide for the couple while Farrell did doctoral research in political science at the New York University. Farrell initially studied American government, but became interested in sex roles and the feminist movement and changed his dissertation topic. He joined the National Organization of Women (NOW) in 1969. Farrell quickly came to the conclusion that women could not be liberated until men were liberated from the constraints of their own ideas about masculinity. In 1971, he became coordinator of NOW's Task Force on the Masculine Mystique, and began a network of more than 200 men's consciousness raising groups throughout the US. For three years, he served on the board of directors of the NYC chapter of National Organization for Women (1971–74).

In the same year he finished his doctorate in 1974, Farrell published The Liberated Man; written from a feminist perspective and based on his experiences with the consciousness raising groups, the book noted that men are also victimized by sexism. For example, he observed that men were forced into a role as breadwinner/provider and socialized to repress their emotions. In parallel to women's experience as "sex objects", Farrell labeled men's experience as "success objects", judged by their status and potential to earn money. As a tool for change, he provided guidelines and suggestions for consciousness raising groups in which men confronted their sexist relationships. He also proposed using gender-neutral language, including pronouns such as 'te' instead of she/he; this approach was critiqued by reviews in the New York Times by Larry McMurtry and John Leonard.

In 1974, Farrell left New York and his teaching at Rutgers when his wife became a White House Fellow to incoming President Gerald Ford in Washington D.C. He taught part-time at American University (1973–74), Georgetown University, (1973–75) and Brooklyn College (1975). The couple separated in 1976, and divorced in 1977.

During this period, Farrell was frequently featured in the media, and mingled with luminaries and media personalities, such as Gloria Steinem and Barbara Walters. He made numerous talk show appearances, including The Phil Donahue Show, and was featured in People. He was known for creating audience participation role-reversal experiences to "let men and women walk around in each other's moccasins".

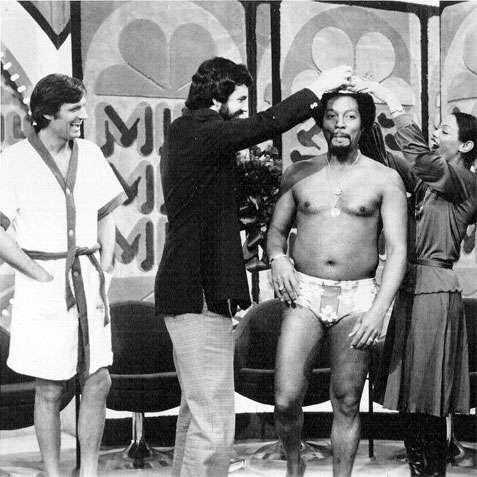
Farrell conducting a "men's beauty contest" on the Mike Douglas Show with Alan Alda, Billy Davis Jr., and Marilyn McCoo, in 1975

In the men's beauty contest, men were invited to experience a woman's perspective, because "for women, life...is a beauty contest in which, willing or not, every women takes part, every day of her life". The male volunteers stripped, posed in swimming suits and were cat-called and criticized. In the "role-reversal date" simulations, women judged "boys" as sex objects based on their appearance while the men viewed women as "success objects" in terms of their earning potential. In another activity, women were placed into rows based on their salaries, with the lowest earners branded as 'losers'. Farrell's advocacy of men's liberation led Carol Kleiman of the Chicago Tribune to call him 'the Gloria Steinem of the men's movement". However, Farrell became disenchanted with the feminist movement due to its stance on custody policy. NOW supported giving child custody to the primary caregiver, which was usually the mother. In a 1997 interview, Farrell stated: "Everything went well until the mid-seventies when NOW came out against the presumption of joint custody. I couldn't believe the people I thought were pioneers in equality were saying that women should have the first option to have children or not to have children — that children should not have equal rights to their dad." Farrell started to believe that feminists were more interested in power for women than in equality between the sexes.

Farrell moved to California in 1978, and taught courses in sex roles and male sexuality at the California School of Professional Psychology from 1978 to 1979, and San Diego State University from 1979 to 1980. In addition, he continued giving role-reversal workshops and other lectures in the US and Canada.

== Research into incest ==
Beginning in 1976, Farrell began writing a book on incest, with the goal of "helping people who were traumatized" by the experience. Wishing to go beyond those identified by legal, psycho-social or medical services, he advertised for people who had had incestuous experiences in newspapers and magazines. He interviewed more than 200 people, and also obtained data on incestuous relations from the Kinsey studies. Between 1977 and 1986, Farrell reported his research in interviews and talks including at the 1983 World Sexology conference. He also wrote on the topic, including a chapter in the Handbook of Sexology: Childhood and adolescent sexology. He challenged the notion that incest is inherently traumatic and harmful, and reported that it was often viewed positively by his informants. He stated that outcomes of incest were almost always negative when they involved a preteen girl and an older male relative. In contrast, incest between mothers and sons, and other combinations (siblings, cousins etc.) were viewed positively by most of his interviewees. Farrell suggested the reason for this gender difference was that women and girls are socialized to feel sexual guilt, and thus later reinterpreted their experience negatively when they learn of the incest taboo. He compared of the effects of incest to a magnifying glass in that they exacerbate difficulties in some families while strengthening relationships in others. He proposed that the terms 'incest', 'victims', 'perpetrators' should be replaced by 'family sex' and 'incest participants'. After some difficulty, Farrell's book found a publisher. However, during the writing period, the research, its methodology and interpretations were criticized by mental health professionals, academics and feminists and Farrell abandoned the project. Nearly twenty years later, Farrell reflected that he better understood the reaction, having raised stepchildren in the meantime. "[I] tried to be neutral, to disengage from the horror, let the data speak for itself, then draw thoughtful, balanced conclusions. Now that I've raised two sets of stepchildren I would have a more gut-level negative reaction. The idea of touching is repulsive. If someone touched one of my daughters when she was 13, I'd be so furious." Farrell also stated that his views had been conflated with those of his subjects, and he was simply reporting how they justified incest.

== Men's issues ==
By 1983 Farrell had turned his attention to the situation of men, and in 1986 published Why Men Are the Way They Are. In his book, he argued that men are the victims of a "new sexism", and feminists are ignoring discrimination against men, and are promoting intolerant, anti-male attitudes. He described what he believed to be each sex's primary fantasies: women to find the economic security associated with one successful man, and men to have sexual access to multiple beautiful women without risking rejection. Conflicts between the sexes are caused by each sex failing to fulfill the desires of the other. According to Farrell, it is a myth that men hold all the power in society as female expectations control men, for example to be a 'success object' – judged by their earning potential so as to attract the sexual interest of women. He taught a course based on the book at the School of Medicine at the University of California, San Diego between 1986 and 1988. He also wrote a series of articles about myths about men which were published in the media.

In his next book, The Myth of Male Power: Why Men Are the Disposable Sex, Farrell elaborated this theme. Published in 1993, the book asserts that the widespread perception of men having inordinate social and economic power is false, and women's sexual power negates any such leverage. He argued that men feel themselves to be disposable, and are systematically disadvantaged in many ways. He noted that men are more likely die or be injured during war and urban violence, and that only men are subject to conscription in the US. Men's life expectation is lower than women's, and more men than women die by suicide. He suggested that research funding is skewed towards women, pointing to more funding for breast cancer than for prostate cancer. He asserted that while some men have high paying jobs with prestige, but most have far less power, and do dangerous and dirty jobs in order to support women or children. He posited that the reason for the pay gap between men and women is the career/family choices women make. He noted that men are also the victims of domestic violence and rape. He stated that many rape accusations and sexual harassment claims are false, the result of misunderstandings. He attacked affirmative action programs, arguing that they increase inequality. He controversially compared the society's treatment of men to Jews during the Second World War, and to that of African Americans, writing that "men are the new n*ggers".

Both books were widely reviewed, often critically, and went into multiple editions and translations. Farrell reported that he had lost income and exposure when he researched incest and began speaking about men's issues, but following publication of these books was again solicited for presentations and interviews in the US and internationally. He appeared once more on talk shows, including the Oprah Winfrey Show.

In 1999, Farrell published his next book, Women Can't Hear What Men Don't Say: Destroying myths, creating love. According to Farrell, the book was an attempt to build bridges between genders, by freeing all from rigid gender roles and drawing to attention to discrimination against men. In the first of three sections, Farrell tackled the issue of communication skills, including expressing feelings and giving and receiving criticism. He provided specific structure and techniques to manage disagreements. In the second section, Farrell argued against the notion that women undertake most of the housework, even when the couple are both working an equal number of hours outside the home. He suggested that men do more home work that is appreciated when all tasks are taken into account. Reviewers commented that this list of "men's" tasks were often ones that did not often need to be done. Farrell returned to the topic of domestic violence, stating that women are equally or more likely to assault men than men are to assault women. He provided examples of negative portrayal of men in cartoons, greeting cards, books, movies and the media. In the third section, Farrell stated that organizations including governments and the media have institutionalized "man bashing". He criticized the women's movement's distinction between empowerment feminism which was, in his view, positive in freeing women, and victim feminism which sees women as the victims of men. He used the term the "Lace Curtain" to describe and critique how institutions see gender issues from a feminist/female lens. Farrell promoted his book in presentations, workshops and tours, including to Canada.

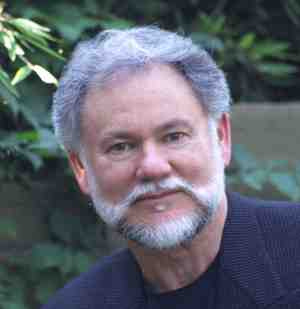
Farrell in 2008

In his next book Father and Child Reunion, published in 2001, Farrell wrote about fathers and children. In it, he noted the desire of fathers to be seen as nurturers and raisers, not just breadwinners. He described this as a revolution in men's desire to reenter the family, parallel to women's desired to enter the workforce. He noted strengths in fathers such as teaching informed risk-taking, and maintaining firm boundaries/rules. Noting the increasing numbers of single fathers, he listed research that suggested that medical, psychological, social and educational outcomes for children being raised by single fathers in the US were better than those raised by single mothers. These fathers were older, better off, and better educated, and typically less negative towards their co-parent. He acknowledged that they were, however, self-selected and highly motivated. Farrell stated that children of divorce do better when three conditions prevail: equally-shared parenting (or joint custody); close parental proximity; and no bad-mouthing between the parents. In the years after publication, he published columns on the subject in the US media and spoke and consulted on the topic. He toured to Canada and Australia to publicize the book, making presentations, and appearing on radio and TV. His work in this area has led to him acting as an expert witness in child custody disputes.

In 2005, Farrell published Why Men Earn More: The Startling Truth Behind the Pay Gap—and What Women Can Do About It, in which he examined the gender pay gap in the United States. In it, he listed 25 differences in men and women's work-life choices which, he argued, accounted for most or all of the pay gap more accurately than did claims of widespread discrimination against women. Farrell wrote that men chose to earn more money, while each of women's choices prioritized having a more fulfilling and balanced life. He suggested that men could learn from women the benefits of more balanced lives, and not just considering careers with high incomes, given that "the road to high pay is a toll road." Farrell offered suggestions for women for achieving higher pay—and accompanied each with their possible trade-offs. These included working more hours and for more years, taking technical or more hazardous jobs, and relocating overseas or traveling overnight. The book was recommended by Marty Nemko in the U.S. News & World Report and by Richard Bolles in What Color Is Your Parachute? as a useful career book for women. It was critiqued by others who commented on the inaccuracies and omissions in the use and interpretation of statistics and the societal and psychological claims made.

Farrell's 2008 book, Does Feminism Discriminate Against Men?, is a debate book with feminist co-author and philosopher James P. Sterba. In the book, Farrell and Sterba debated 13 topics, including criminal justice, power, work and pay, the military, health, marriage and divorce, domestic violence, rape and media bias against men. In his section, Farrell repeated themes and evidence from his past books, emphasizing his view that feminism is damaging men by failing to accept the privileges of womanhood. In this book, as at other times, Farrell addressed abortion arguing that it is unjust that a woman can unilaterally decide to keep a pregnancy, thus forcing unwilling fathers to pay child support, or end a pregnancy without input from the father. Reviewers differed on whether Farrell or Sterba's arguments were the stronger, as well as whether the book would be useful as a text at universities, with critiques of its binary, confrontational format.

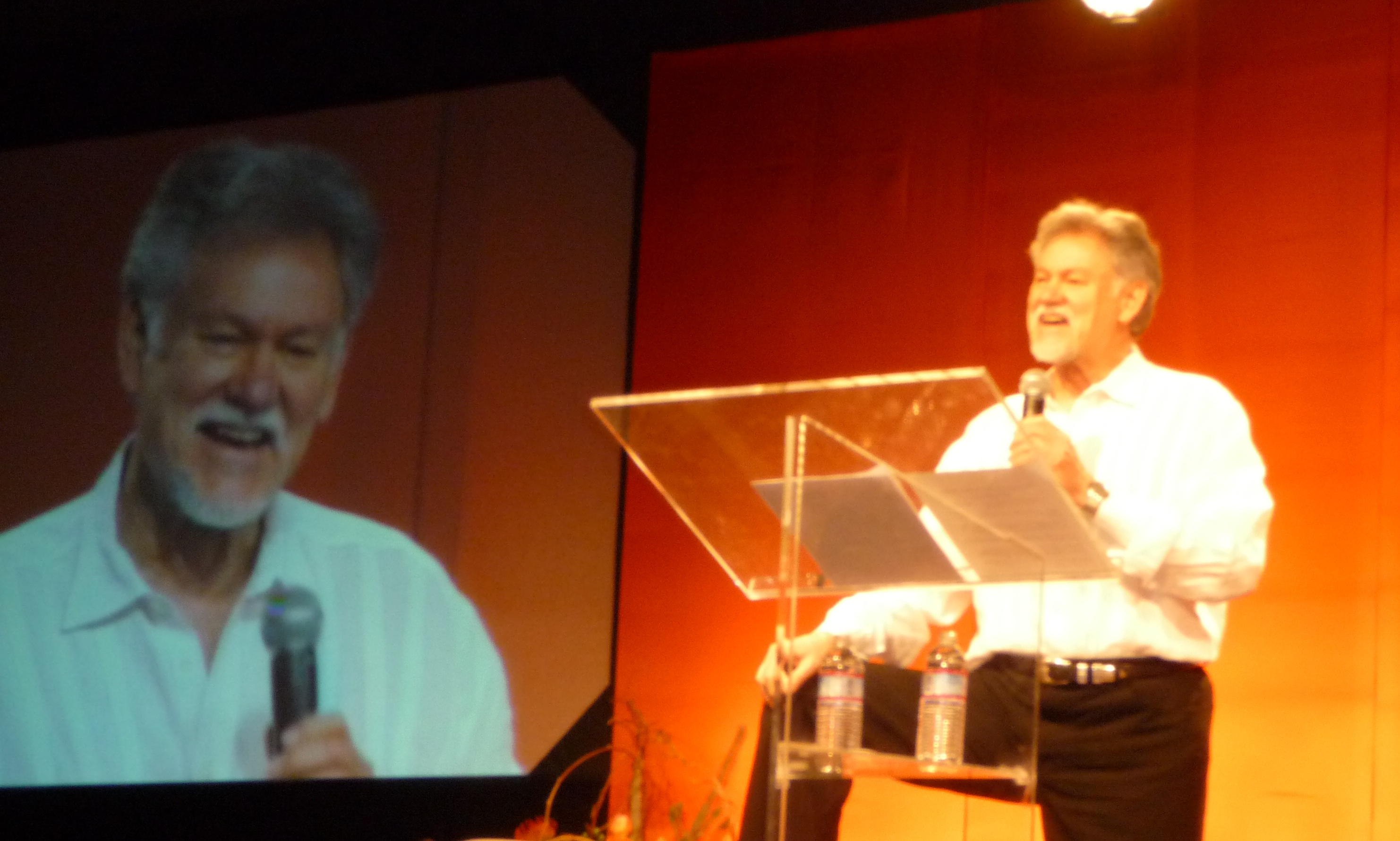
Farrell addressing a world conference of spiritual leaders, 2010

In 2018 Farrell co-authored The Boy Crisis with John Gray, writing that boys are falling behind girls in education, physical, mental and emotional health and behavior across developed nations. The book discussed contributing factors such as educational under-performance and mental/emotional health challenges, particularly in father-absent households. Farrell and Gray argued that "dad deprivation", the result of high divorce rates, significantly impacts boys' outcomes in emotional and behavioral areas. They proposed that boys to be taught "health intelligence" to keep them happy and safe, not just the traditional "heroic intelligence" in which men rescue, protect and provide for others. They argued for fathers (and mothers) to be deeply involved with their children, and proposed a range of solutions for reclaiming the relationship.

== Couples coaching ==
In recent years, Farrell has become known for his work coaching couples. In 2024, Farrell published Role Mate to Soul Mate, which is based on his decades of experience teaching couples workshops. The book offers practical tips and suggestions about how to transform relationship challenges into opportunities for intimacy, and extends these methods beyond romantic relationships to communication with family, co-workers and across political divides.

== Reception and influence ==
Farrell's books are known for their popular style, including short chapters with bold headings and slogans. Reviewers praise his books and presentations for raising the important topic of men's issues. They comment on the wealth of statistics and other evidence, and the thought provoking questions these raise. In addition, the books often contain useful, specific resources and suggestions. Reviewers also comment on a polemic and strident tone. They report dubious, overstated assertions, often supported by anecdotal evidence and questionable statistics.

Farrell's books are influential in the men's rights and incel movements, with the Myth of Male Power frequently described as the "MRA bible". He is widely regarded as the intellectual father of the men's rights movement. Farrell has regularly appeared at their events. In November 2012, he spoke on men's issues at a talk the University of Toronto organized by the Canadian Association for Equality. About a hundred students protested his talk, barricading the entrance and loudly heckling attendees: a protestor was arrested. With the help of police, Farrell entered through a rear door and delivered his speech. The protest was featured by the men's rights website A Voice for Men, and few months later, Farrell met the site's founder Paul Elam. Elam had long been inspired by Farrell's writings and Farrell became his mentor. He added Farrell's writings to his website and the two began co-hosting a monthly online chat. Farrell was a featured speaker at a men's rights conference organized by A Voice for Men held in Detroit in June 2014. He appeared in Cassie Jaye's 2016 documentary film about the men's rights movement, The Red Pill. The same year, Farrell gave a keynote speech at the Male Psychology Conference at University College London. Farrell has been cited as an influence by psychologist Jordan Peterson; Farrell has appeared several times on his podcast, and teaches at the Jordan Peterson Academy.

Farrell speaking the CAFE event at the University of Toronto, November 16, 2012

Farrell's gentle, thoughtful, softly-spoken demeanor and non-confrontational personal style are often contrasted with those of his men's rights admirers. Farrell himself denies being a men's rights activist, and has recommended avoiding the term "men's rights", arguing that it is easily misunderstood as denying the advantages held by men, when the focus should be on the disadvantages men experience. He concedes that the men's rights movement includes a minority of angry and misogynistic members but states that it is vital to acknowledge that men are hurting and are crying out in pain. He suggests that frequent shooting rampages in the US are the result of society not paying attention to the boy crisis and the issue of fatherlessness. He states that through history rights movements have had and have needed more extreme factions.

In 2009, the Obama White House asked Farrell to be an advisor to the White House Council on Women and Girls. This led to Farrell starting a commission to create a similar one for boys and men. The multi-partisan group included more than 30 persons knowledgeable and concerned about boys' and men's issues. They submitted a proposal for President Obama to create a White House Council on Boys and Men in 2011, but it was not accepted. In April 2015, the coalition pursued the project by going to Iowa to discuss the proposal with 2016 U.S. presidential candidates. Farrell tried convince the Clinton campaign to acknowledge issues faced by boys and men, including the importance of fathers, but the idea was not adopted. According to Farrell, he spoke about the issue to White House staffers during the 2016 Trump presidency and the 2020 Biden presidency, but neither administration adopted the proposal. During the 2024 presidential campaign, Farrell suggested that the Democrats orientation towards feminism, and lack of focus on issues facing men and boys explained why men were supporting Donald Trump.

Farrell has served on the board of advisers/directors of the National Coalition for Men, and the Children's Rights Council. He is on the steering committee for the Coalition to Create a White House Council on Boys & Men.

The documentary "Warren Farrell Interrupted: The Boy Crisis", covering his life, career and ideas, won the humanitarian documentary award at the Idyllwild International Festival of Cinema in 2025.

== Personal life ==
After his divorce in 1977, Farrell had, by his own account "twenty years of adventuresome singlehood". During this time, he had several serious live-in relationships, including one in which he lived with a stepdaughter. In August 2002, Farrell married Liz Dowling, and he has two stepdaughters. The couple resides in Mill Valley, California.

During the 2003 California gubernatorial recall election, Farrell ran as a Democratic candidate, on a platform of fathers' rights, and received 626 votes. Farrell backed Hillary Clinton in the 2016 US presidential election.

== Bibliography ==
- Farrell, Warren (1974). The liberated man. New York: Berkley Books. ISBN 978-0-425-13680-5.
- Farrell, Warren (1986). Why men are the way they are: the male-female dynamic. Bantam. ISBN 978-0-553-17628-5.
- Farrell, Warren (1993). The myth of male power: why men are the disposable sex. New York: Berkley Books. ISBN 978-0-425-18144-7.
- Farrell, Warren (1999). Women can't hear what men don't say: destroying myths, creating love. Sydney: Finch Publishing. ISBN 978-1-876451-31-8.
- Farrell, Warren (2001). Father and child reunion: how to bring the dads we need to the children we love. Sydney: Finch Publishing. ISBN 978-1-876451-32-5.
- Farrell, Warren (2005). Why men earn more: the startling truth behind the pay gap and what women can do about it. New York: American Management Association. ISBN 978-0-8144-7210-1.
- Farrell, Warren; Sterba, James P. (2008). Does feminism discriminate against men?. Oxford & New York: Oxford University Press. ISBN 978-0-19-531282-9.
- Farrell, Warren; Gray, John (2018). The Boy Crisis: Why Our Boys Are Struggling and What We Can Do About It. Dallas, TX: BenBella Books. ISBN 978-1-942952-71-8.
- Farrell, Warren (2024). Role Mate to Soul Mate. Dallas, Texas: BenBella. ISBN 9781637744567.
