= Julie S. Lalonde =

Canadian educator and women's rights activist

- Born: Sudbury, Ontario, Canada
- Education: Carleton University
- Notable work: Resilience is Futile: The Life and Death and Life of Julie S. Lalonde (2020)

Julie S. Lalonde (born 18 June) is a Franco-Ontarian women's rights advocate, author, and educator. She has created multiple feminist organizations and education campaigns, and has offered many training sessions surrounding sexual violence, harassment, and bystander intervention. Her first book, Resilience is Futile: The Life and Death and Life of Julie S. Lalonde, was published in February 2020.

== Early life and education ==
Julie Lalonde was born in Sudbury, Ontario, and later moved to Ottawa, where she currently resides. She attended Carleton University, where she received a Bachelor of Arts (honours) in Canadian Studies and Women's Studies in 2007, and a Master of Arts in Canadian Studies in 2013. Her thesis focused on elderly women experiencing isolation and poverty in Ottawa. As a student, Lalonde spent six years advocating for the creation of an on-campus sexual assault centre for Carleton University, which eventually opened in 2013.

== Career ==
In 2011, Lalonde helped establish and manage the Ontario provincial campaign, Draw the Line, which promotes public education about sexual violence, harassment, consent, and bystander intervention.

Around the same time, Lalonde founded the Ottawa chapter, the first in Canada, of Hollaback!, an international non-profit organization fighting to end street harassment. Since 2013, Lalonde, as the director of Hollaback! Ottawa, has been advocating for OC Transpo to implement initiatives to reduce harassment on public transit. In 2015, the "Let OC Transpo Know" campaign was implemented, encouraging transit passengers to report when they feel unsafe or experience harassment. As of 2019, Lalonde has continued to have conversations with OC Transpo, pushing for further bystander intervention training and education campaigns.

In 2017, Lalonde, in collaboration with Montreal-based artist Ambivalently Yours, created Outside of the Shadows, a bilingual art and educational project about criminal harassment in Canada, based on her own experience of being stalked. The project includes a short film posted on YouTube and a series of posters providing advice for both survivors and witnesses of stalking.

On 29 September 2016, Lalonde gave the keynote speech at her hometown's Take Back the Night march in Sudbury.

On 11 March 2020, Library and Archives Canada hosted the book launch for Lalonde's debut release, Resilience is Futile: The Life and Death and Life of Julie S. Lalonde. Named one of CBC Books' best Canadian nonfiction of 2020, Lalonde's memoir details her decade-long experience of being stalked by a former boyfriend.

=== Anti-harassment training ===
In October 2014, Lalonde was contracted to give a series of presentations about consent and sexual violence to the Royal Military College of Canada, where she alleged she was met with "incredible hostility" from the officer cadets.

The controversy surrounding the alleged hostility was due to Lalonde's position "...men are the problem when it comes to sex assault because most rape is perpetrated by men", according to one Officer Cadet who had attended the presentation. Respect for Lalonde's presentation was lost after she was pressed on sexual assault and intoxication, in particular when both participants were intoxicated claiming men could still be accused of sexual assault.

She received a formal letter of apology from the commandant of the RMC five months after making a complaint. In February 2018, Lalonde offered training sessions about sexual harassment prevention at the NDP convention. She led similar anti-harassment sessions at a Liberal Party convention with Canadian Prime Minister Justin Trudeau in attendance. In 2019, Lalonde ran bilingual closed-door training sessions about harassment prevention and bystander intervention in the workplace organized by the Prime Minister's Office and the Liberal Research Bureau.

== Awards and recognition ==
Lalonde has received several awards and recognition for both her activism and her writing.

- Shortlisted for the 2009 YWCA Women of Distinction Award
- Winner of the 2011 Femmy Award for her work towards women's equality in the National Capital Region
- Youth Recipient of the 2013 Governor General's Award in Commemoration of the Persons Case
- Winner of the 2020 Ontario Speaker's Book Award for Resilience is Futile: The Life and Death and Life of Julie S. Lalonde
- Shortlisted for the 2020 Foreword INDIES Book of the Year Award for Resilience is Futile: The Life and Death and Life of Julie S. Lalonde
