= The Myth of Male Power =

1993 book by Warren Farrell

- Author: Warren Farrell
- Language: English
- Subject: Men's rights
- Publisher: Berkley Trade
- Publication date: 1993 (Simon and Schuster, 1st ed.); 2000 (Berkley, 2nd edition)
- Publication place: United States
- Media type: Print (hardcover and paperback)
- Pages: 488
- ISBN: 978-0-425-18144-7
- OCLC: 46792833
- Dewey Decimal: 305.32 21
- LC Class: HQ1090.3 .F36 2001

The Myth of Male Power: Why Men are the Disposable Sex is a 1993 book by Warren Farrell, in which the author argues that the widespread perception of men having inordinate social and economic power is false, and that men are systematically disadvantaged in many ways.

Like Herb Goldberg's The Hazards of Being Male, Farrell's The Myth of Male Power is considered a standard of the men's movement, and has been translated into several languages, including German and Italian.

== Defining male power and powerlessness ==
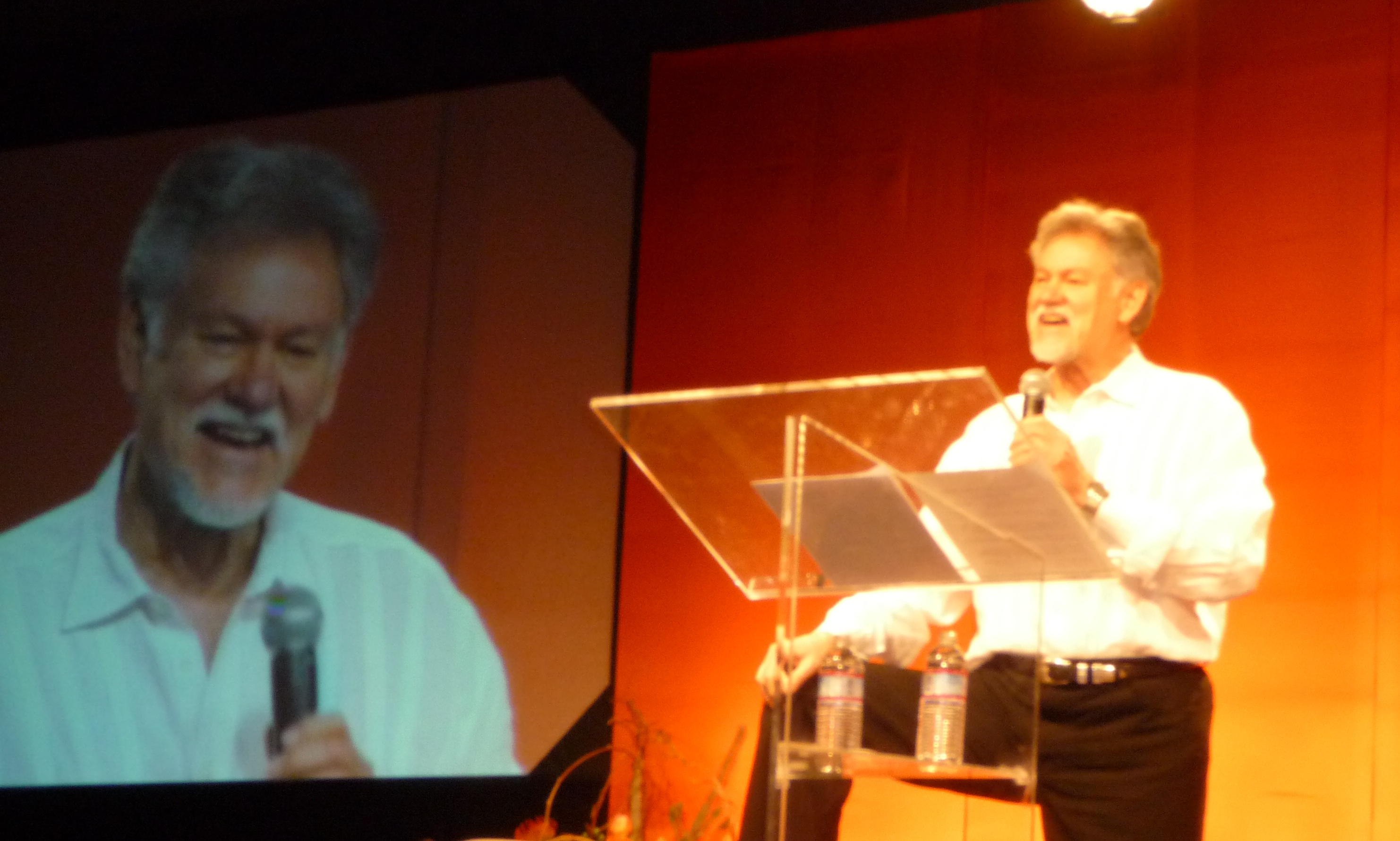
Farrell explaining the future of our sons' definition of 'power' at the Integral Spiritual Experience World Conference of Spiritual Leaders, 2010.

In The Myth of Male Power, Warren Farrell offered his first in-depth outline of the thesis he would eventually apply in his subsequent books—books on communication (Women Can’t Hear What Men Don’t Say), parenting (Father and Child Reunion), and the workplace (Why Men Earn More).

As The Myth of Male Power's title implies, Farrell challenges the belief that men have the power by challenging the definition of power. Farrell defines power as "control over one's life." He writes that, "In the past, neither sex had power; both sexes had roles: women's role was [to] raise children; men's role was [to] raise money."

One of the examples that Farrell uses to illustrate male powerlessness is male-only draft registration. He writes that if any other single group (the examples he lists are Jews, African Americans, and women) were selected based on their birth characteristics to be the only group required by law to register for potential death, we would call it anti-Semitism, racism or genocidal sexism. Men, he says, have been socialized to call it "glory" and "power," and as a result do not view this as a negative.

Farrell contends that this viewpoint creates psychological problems for both sexes: that "men's weakness is their facade of strength; women's strength is their facade of weakness." He adds that societies have generally socialized boys and men to define power as, in essence, "feeling obligated to earn money someone else spends while we die sooner." Feeling obligated, he contends, is not power.

== Critical responses ==
Academic Kenneth Clatterbaugh, in an overview of literature of the men's movement, comments that "eventually, [Farrell's] arguments reach absurd heights, as when Farrell actually argues against sexual harassment laws and child molestation laws on the grounds that they give even more power (to abuse men) to (women) employees and children".

Feminist social critic Camille Paglia, writing for The Washington Post, says The Myth of Male Power "attacks the unexamined assumptions of feminist discourse with shocking candor and forces us to see our everyday world from a fresh perspective," though she added that Farrell is sometimes guilty of "questionable selectiveness or credulity about historical sources". Paglia nevertheless concludes that the book "is the kind of original, abrasive, heretical text that is desperately needed to restore fairness and balance to the present ideology-sodden curriculum of women's studies courses."

Reviewer Robert Winder describes the book as "shock-horror hyperbole posing as scholarship" and goes on to write "Farrell might be right to see the gender conflict as a war to which only one side has turned up, but this is only a sarcastic way of confessing to an authentic male worry: the twinge of jealousy men sometimes feel when confronted by feminine solidarity. Farrell, however, just like some of his female opposite numbers, prefers accusation to self-examination".

Linda Mealey notes that the book is recommended reading for educators in the social sciences, particularly gender studies; she does also critique Farrell for easily seeing causality in correlation.

Academic Margot Mifflin writes that "most of Farrell’s tit-for-tat theories about man’s greater societal burden are slanted, self-serving, and absurdly simplistic."

The Los Angeles Times notes that "some critics say 'The Myth of Male Power' goes beyond the nurturing rituals of the male movement to mount an outright assault on the victories of the modern women's movement."

An article in Mother Jones notes that the book "has spawned a network of activists and sites that take Farrell's ideology in a disturbing direction."

The book includes several factual errors concerning murderer Laurie Dann, who is used as an example of violence against men by women. He claimed that all of Dann's victims were male, that she had burned down a Young Men's Jewish Council, had burned two boys in a basement, had shot her own son and had justified the murder of Nick Corwin by claiming he was a rapist. Men's rights activists, academics, and the media have repeated Farrell's errors and conclusion. Farrell later issued a partial correction on his web site. (Note: "While Laurie Dann did go into a boys' bathroom and not a girls' bathroom, and tried to kill the boys for whom she was a babysitter, the Chicago Tribune on May 21, 1988, section 1, does list two women who were direct victims of Laurie Dann, and a mother who was an indirect victim, when she tried to rescue her two sons who had been taken to a basement by Laurie Dann, who immediately lit a fire in the basement. Therefore my suggestion that she was a parallel force to the celebrated University of Montreal killer who focused on women, was not accurate. — W. Farrell")

== See also ==
- Men's Rights Movement
- John Gray
- Ken Wilber
- Richard Bolles
- The Manipulated Man
- Of Boys and Men
