= Michael Messner =

American sociologist & feminist philosopher (born 1952)

- Born: Michael Alan Messner; 1952 (age 73–74); Salinas, California, United States
- Awards: Pursuit of Justice Award from the California Women's Law Center (2011)

Academic background
- Education: California State University, Chico (B.A. and M.A.); University of California, Berkeley (Ph.D.)
- Thesis: Masculinity and sports: an exploration of the changing meaning of male identity in the lifecourse of the athlete (1985)

Academic work
- Institutions: University of Southern California
- Main interests: Men's studies, sociology of sports, masculinities, men and feminism
- Website: http://www.michaelmessner.org

Michael Alan Messner (born 1952) is an American sociologist. His main areas of research are gender (especially men's studies) and the sociology of sports. He is the author of several books, he gives public speeches and teaches on issues of gender-based violence, the lives of men and boys, and gender and sports.

Since 1987, Messner has worked as a professor of sociology and gender studies at the University of Southern California. He was head of the department, and still retains his dual faculty appointment. He was the president of the Pacific Sociological Association in 2010–2011, and in 2011 the California Women's Law Center presented him with the Pursuit of Justice Award.

== Biography ==
Messner was born in Salinas, California.

=== Education ===
Messner was educated from kindergarten to his Ph.D. in California's public schools. He has a bachelor's degree in social science and a master's degree in sociology from California State University, Chico. He obtained a Ph.D. in sociology in 1985 from the University of California, Berkeley with a dissertation titled Masculinity and Sports: An Exploration of the Changing Meaning of Male Identity in the Lifecourse of the Athlete.

In the late 1970s, he began to work with feminist theory and the construction of gender. He took part in one of the first ever classes about men and masculinity in the US, held by Bob Blauner in Berkeley.

== Views ==
=== Comments regarding "fight clubs" ===
In an article about a "fight club" in Menlo Park, California, Messner remarked that men involved in them "often carry bottled-up violent impulses learned in childhood from video games, cartoons and movies. [...] Boys have these warrior fantasies picked up from popular culture, and schools sort of force that out of them." In these fantasies: "The good guys always resort to violence, and they always get the glory and the women."

=== Sexuality and Gender Roles ===
Messner establishes the emphasis society puts on sexuality and gender roles in various works upholding the notions that roles in society are predetermined by these categorizations. Gender role is the set of characteristics prescribed by a culture and expressed through direct communication and through media. These predetermined roles can lead to inequivalent advantages to people classified in certain categories over others. In many societies, this has become a systematic oppression. He discusses these ideas through various articles and explores different topics such as the participation of women in sports as well as what it means to be 100% straight.

Messner upholds the theory that sexuality is, "a constructed identity, a performance, and an institution". It is not necessary and it influences behaviors in society every day. He discusses this idea in depth in his article, "Becoming 100 percent Straight". In this article, he discusses how he as a teenager was influenced to become a jock because of his height and build and, as a result, repressed his sexual fluidity in fear of being outcast. He talks about his experience with basketball and his relationship with his friend because of his repressed romantic feelings for him. As a result of these feelings, he targets him as an external source of his frustrations and even goes as far as bullying him to express these frustrations. Although Messner does not identify as bisexual, he describes his experiences based on the Freudian model of bisexuality which states that most people go through a stage in life in which they are attracted to people of the same sex. Adult experiences eventually lead them to shift their sexual desires to people of the same sex. This suppression of sexual desires can lead to aggression and violence in order to clarify boundaries between one's self and others. His experience serves as an example of a new perspective on sexuality that others in dominant gender/sexuality categories can identify with: one that is not dominated by socially constructed values.

Along with sexuality, Messner views gender to be a determining factor of the roles we exhibit in society. The world of sports is a prime example of the inherent differences that are constructed for different genders. Sports are a terrain of contested gender relations to Messner. Before the 1970s, girls did not feel as if they belonged in the sporting world because they were not made for it. However, Title IX passed in the early 70's gave them the equal opportunity to pursue sports in school. The participation in sports by women has a strong correlation with the presence of women in the workplace. While the participation of women in sports is a triumph in a movement toward equality, the sports world is still inherently different for men and women. It is fueled by "soft-essentialism", Messner's theory of the shared belief that boys and girls are inherently different as opposed to "hard essentialism," which basically creates a more categorical structure for men. Men are pushed to be more competitive than women through this notion of hard essentialism leading them to be driven by a linear notion that success and leadership in the workplace is the ultimate goal. Women, however, are routed towards sports like softball or even in different leagues altogether giving them choices and complicating the meaning of equality. He argues that separate can never truly be equal because of these components. This furthers the frame of mind that men and women are inherently different, and girls should not be where the boys are.

While integration of sports sound like an opportunity for equality, this idea of merging boys and girls together in youth sports would be potentially counterproductive. Sexists attitudes and presumptions develop in either scenario; if sports become coed, girls may be seen as disadvantaged, but if sports stay segregated the theory of soft essentialism can only help but run up against the social barriers of equal choice for women today. In order to dismantle the notion of soft essentialism, a coupled strategy of de-gendering boys sports along with a strategic categorization of women's sports can help break down gender based inequalities exhibited in society.

Gender also plays a key role in the development of gifted students. Gender identities in gifted students usually differ from those of their peers. For example, gifted girls are more like gifted boys than other girls. This complicates the development of their gender identity. Girls are more likely to underachieve because of stereotypes such as, "girls are bad at math" even though the math gap has shrunk significantly where the discrepancy between boys and girls used to be extreme. For this reason it is important for counselors to be practiced in understanding gender educational practices and support students.

Sports and education provide a look at the inequalities found based on gender in boys and girls, but it does not paint the picture of gender and sexuality relations in society as a whole. Messner's views of gender predetermining roles in society is seen in extreme ways when looking at other cultures such as the Congolese. For example, when Moore wrote of her experiences in the Congo with women's rights, she found disturbing evidence that women were only used to birth children. When a women's workshop was held demonstrating that it is wrong for a husband to beat his wife, one man asked, "But if we can't beat our wives what can we do when they won't have sex with us?" This shows a universal, somewhat exaggerated, example of how women are seen in society, as childbearers. Male entitlement to women's bodies has become a standard in societies such as these and reflects the values that feminists like Messner aim to change.

Sexuality is a powerful tool used to control nations especially when it is paired with orthodox religious thinking. Feki states, "If you want to understand a people, look in their bedrooms". Her hypothesis is correct when looking at societies such as Egypt. Governments and parents do not trust their children enough to learn about sex education. As a result, religious views of sexuality are established and followed strictly. Women are expected to remain virgins until marriage and chastity thereafter even though their sexuality is a family matter, usually determined by the patriarch on when and who she weds. It is this thinking that has kept women from leadership positions in the workplace and in politics. If women are not deemed responsible enough to control their own bodies, they will not be deemed capable of leading in any aspect. This affirms Messner's belief that roles in society are determined by one's gender and sexuality.

Messner examines gender and sexuality and concludes that they play an important role in determining one's place in society. They can shape the way people behave and develop and can mold views and actions to fit society's standards. It is fueled by notion that men and women are inherently different, a term Messner coins as soft essentialism. This theory often leads to sexuality and gender used as tools of oppression in some cultures which leads to views of women as sexual objects for men who do not have control of their bodies. Religion is sometimes paired with this theory to further the old hegemonic patriarchies established in emerging democracies such as Egypt. Changing the frame of mind of what sexuality and gender truly mean in society will help take steps towards equality. Equal opportunity for people of differing genders and sexuality can only benefit a society. For example, countries such as Germany, Denmark, and Norway have the closest gender gap in the workplace and they have some of the most powerful economies because of it according to Reding who states, "Humans are distinguished in their contributions to society by character, ability, and motivation, and there is no meaningful correlation between those traits and sex and sexuality".

=== Title IX ===
Messner has spoken out as a strong advocate for Title IX. Having interests in both gender studies and sports, he has analyzed it both from a feminist and sports perspective. Published in the Journal of Sport and Social Issues, his article "Social justice and Men's Interests: The Case of Title IX" reviews the effect Title IX has on men's interest in sports. He argues that although "men's superordinate status sets the stage for them to understand their interests as opposed to those of women", men gain much from integration of women into sports. He states that "these kinds of experiences can provide a commitment for men to take action with girls, women, and other men who are interested in building a more equitable and just world". Overall, Messner believes that only through integration and mutual respect in all institutions (particularly sport) can we begin to grow relationships between men and women that allow for a better future for both parties.

== Research ==
Messner has conducted research in several subcategories of Sociology over four decades. Primarily, his research was influenced by several events that took place in the mid 20th century. He states in his online biography: "My teaching and research were sparked and continue to be animated by the movements for social justice that erupted in the 1960s, 1970s and beyond, especially feminism". Messner's research can be broken up into three main categories: gender and sport; sports media; and men, feminism and politics.

=== Gender and Sport ===
Messner has written four books and over eleven articles on gender and sport. His main article contributions have been to the Sociology of Sport Journal, Gender & Society, and other scholarly journals. His website features many of these articles.

==== Soft Essentialism ====
In his paper, "Gender ideologies, youth sports, and the production of soft essentialism" Messner introduces the concept of soft essentialism as "a currently ascendant hegemonic ideology… that valorizes the liberal feminist ideal of individual choice for girls, while retaining a largely naturalized view of boys and men". He argues that essentially, especially in youth sports, we assume natural differences between boys and girls. However, by offering girls equal opportunity, soft essentialism does not "endorse categorical social containment of women in domestic life". While this type of thought is less restrictive for girls and women than hard essentialism, because it still uses institutions (particularly sport) to reinforce a "natural difference" between boys and girls, it is still counterproductive to the feminism movement as a whole. Through extensive research and interviewing of youth soccer, baseball, and softball coaches about boys, girls, and gender, Messner found that most adults had a tendency to describe girls' lives as being full of choices – a way of thinking that Messner argues is a major accomplishment of liberal feminism. However, he found that when asked about boys, the responses were less sophisticated and assumed that boys were simply driven by testosterone. In his conclusion, Messner determines that there exist three main sources of strain that proliferate hegemonic gender inequality in the form of soft essentialism: working class mothers, today's largely unreconstructed and categorical view of boys, and the celebration of equal opportunity and free choice for girls. He argues that strategic categoricalism in girls' sports coupled with a de-gendering of boys' sports.

=== Sports Media ===
Messner has conducted research in sports media for over twenty years, focusing on what it covers and ignores. On his website he breaks his research down into three main areas: "First, [he] has conducted a longitudinal content and textual analysis of gender in televised news and highlights programs. Second, [he] is interested in how the sports media handles a particular story, especially a "scandal." Third, [he] is interested in the dominant gendered messages that are pitched to boys and men as consumers through sport broadcasts". Overall, Messner believes that sports media is yet another institution that promotes patriarchal sexist ideology.

Most of Messner's research in sports media revolves around the way the media portrays females and female athletes. In his most recent article on sports media, "Women Play Sport, But Not on TV: A Longitudinal Study of Televised News Media" he and co-authors Cheryl Cooky and Robin Hextrum analyze 6 weeks of local and national news coverage. Their evidence found that despite "tremendous increased participation of girls and women in sport at the high school, collegiate, and professional level," coverage of women's sport on television is "the lowest ever". Through their research, Messner, Cooky, and Hextrum determined that sports media doesn't simply show what people want to see, but rather proliferates hegemonic gender asymmetries by contributing to a specific reception of sport that idealizes it as a man's world.

=== Men and Feminism ===
In his research on both men and women's studies, Messner has analyzed the feminist movement from a male perspective since the 1970s. His research particularly focuses on men's personal, organizational and political responses to feminism. His most recent contribution to feminism is his co-authored book, Some Men: Feminist Allies and the Movement to End Violence Against Women, which was released in March 2015 through the Oxford University Press. As a general trend, Messner believes that it is in the best interest of men to support the feminist movement and the end of sexism. In his 2004 article "On Patriarchs and Losers: Rethinking Men's Interests", Messner explores the concept of "men's interests', deciding whether or not there exists a universal interest for men and how that plays into the role of feminism in the United States. Furthermore, he discusses the development of the scholarly focus on "men and masculinity", observing exactly how men's interests in the United States are being articulated both in commercial and political discourse. Messner believes that all men must be on board with feminism. In particular, he points out an example with a young white guy speeding by in a pick-up truck with a gun rack. He writes, "I want that guy in the men's movement… and to get him involved, we have to convince him that the masculinity he has learned is self-destructive and toxic, and that feminist change is in his interest". Messner argues that, at its core, feminism is in the best interest of every person because systemic, hegemonic oppression harms everyone, not just women.

== Works (selection) ==
=== Books ===
- Messner, Michael A.; Kimmel, Michael S. (2007) [1989]. Men's lives (8th ed.). Boston, Massachusetts: Allyn and Bacon. ISBN 9780205485451.
- Messner, Michael A.; Sabo, Donald F. (1990). Sport, men, and the gender order: critical feminist perspectives. Champaign, Illinois: Human Kinetics Books. ISBN 9780873224215.
- Messner, Michael A. (1992). Power at play: sports and the problem of masculinity. Boston, Massachusetts: Beacon Press. ISBN 9780807041055.
- Messner, Michael A.; Sabo, Donald F. (1994). Sex, violence & power in sports: rethinking masculinity. Freedom, California: Crossing Press. ISBN 9780895946881.
- Messner, Michael A. (2000). Politics of masculinities: men in movements. Gender lens series in sociology, Volume 3. Lanham, Maryland Oxford, England: Alta Mira Press. ISBN 9780759117556.
- Messner, Michael A.; Baca Zinn, Maxine; Hondagneu-Sotelo, Pierrette (2011) [1997]. Gender through the prism of difference (4th ed.). New York: Oxford University Press. ISBN 9780199743025.
- Messner, Michael A.; McKay, Jim; Sabo, Donald F. (2000). Masculinities, gender relations, and sport. Research on Men and Masculinities Series, Volume 13. Thousand Oaks, California: Sage. ISBN 9780761912729.
- Messner, Michael A. (2002). Taking the field: women, men, and sports. Sport and culture series, Volume 4. Minneapolis: University of Minnesota Press. ISBN 9780816634491.
- Messner, Michael A.; Gatz, Margaret; Ball-Rokeach, Sandra J. (2002). Paradoxes of youth and sport. Albany, New York: State University of New York Press. ISBN 9780791453230.
- Messner, Michael A. (2007). Out of play: critical essays on gender and sport. Suny Series on Sport, Culture, and Social Relations. Albany: State University of New York Press. ISBN 9780791471715.
- Messner, Michael A. (2009). It's all for the kids: gender, families, and youth sports. Berkeley: University of California Press. ISBN 9780520257085.
- Messner, Michael A. (2011). King of the wild suburb: a memoir of fathers, sons and guns. Austin, Texas: Plain View Press. ISBN 9781935514909.

=== Articles ===
- Messner, Michael A. (September 1988). "Sports and male domination: the female athlete as contested ideological terrain". Sociology of Sport Journal. 5 (3). Human Kinetics Publishers: 197–211. doi:10.1123/ssj.5.3.197. S2CID 36069927. Pdf.
- Messner, Michael A. (March 1989). "Masculinities and athletic careers". Gender & Society. 3 (1). SAGE: 71–88. doi:10.1177/089124389003001005. JSTOR 190040. S2CID 145180893. Pdf.
- Messner, Michael A. (January 1990). "Boyhood, organized sports and the construction of masculinities". Journal of Contemporary Ethnography. 18 (4). SAGE: 416–444. doi:10.1177/089124190018004003. S2CID 145669807.
- Messner, Michael A. (September 1990). "When bodies are weapons: Masculinity and violence in sport". International Review for the Sociology of Sport. 25 (3). SAGE: 203–220. doi:10.1177/101269029002500303. S2CID 143999500.
- Messner, Michael A.; Carlisle Duncan, Margaret; Jensen, Kerry (March 1993). "Separating the men from the girls: the gendered language of televised sports". Gender & Society. 7 (1). SAGE: 121–137. doi:10.1177/089124393007001007. JSTOR 190027. S2CID 144825977. Pdf.
- Messner, Michael A. (June 1998). "The limits of "The Male Sex Role": an analysis of the men's liberation and men's rights movements' discourse". Gender & Society. 12 (3). SAGE: 255–276. doi:10.1177/0891243298012003002. JSTOR 190285. S2CID 143890298. Pdf.
- Messner, Michael A. (1999). "Becoming 100 percent straight". In Coakley, Jay; Donnelly, Peter (eds.). Inside sports. London New York: Routledge. pp. 97–103. ISBN 9780415170895.
- Messner, Michael A. (April 2000). "White guy habitus in the classroom: challenging the reproduction of privilege". Men and Masculinities. 2 (4). SAGE: 457–469. doi:10.1177/1097184X00002004005. S2CID 145608850. Pdf.
- Messner, Michael A.; Dunbar, Michele; Hunt, Darnell (November 2000). "The televised sports manhood formula". Journal of Sport & Social Issues. 24 (4). SAGE: 380–394. doi:10.1177/0193723500244006. S2CID 145743997. Pdf.
- Messner, Michael A. (December 2000). "Barbie girls vs. sea monsters: children constructing gender". Gender & Society. 14 (6). SAGE: 765–784. doi:10.1177/089124300014006004. S2CID 52253024. Pdf.
- Messner, Michael A.; Carlisle Duncan, Margaret; Cooky, Cheryl (February 2003). "Silence, sports bras, and wrestling porn: women in televised sports news and highlights shows". Journal of Sport & Social Issues. 27 (1). SAGE: 38–51. doi:10.1177/0193732502239583. S2CID 144711134.
- Messner, Michael A. (2004). "On patriarchs and losers: rethinking men's interests". Berkeley Journal of Sociology. 48. Regents of the University of California: 74–88. JSTOR 41035593. Pdf.
- Messner, Michael A.; Montez de Oca, Jeffrey (Spring 2005). "The male consumer as loser: beer and liquor ads in mega sports media events". Signs: Journal of Women in Culture and Society. 30 (3). University of Chicago Press: 1879–1909. doi:10.1086/427523. S2CID 144238087. Pdf.
- Messner, Michael A.; Carlisle Duncan, Margaret; Willms, Nicole (August 2006). "This revolution is not being televised". Contexts. 5 (3). SAGE: 34–38. doi:10.1525/ctx.2006.5.3.34. S2CID 62475003. Pdf.
- Messner, Michael A. (August 2007). "The masculinity of the governator: muscle and compassion in politics". Gender & Society. 21 (4). SAGE: 461–481. doi:10.1177/0891243207303166. JSTOR 27640987. S2CID 145517535.
- Messner, Michael A.; Solomon, Nancy M. (May 2007). "Social justice and men's interests: the case of Title IX". Journal of Sport and Social Issues. 31 (2). SAGE: 162–178. doi:10.1177/0193723507301048. S2CID 145417637. Pdf.
- Messner, Michael A.; Bozada-Deas, Suzel (February 2009). "Separating the men from the moms: the making of adult sex segregation in youth sports". Gender & Society. 23 (1). SAGE: 49–71. doi:10.1177/0891243208327363. JSTOR 20676749. S2CID 143086128. Pdf.
- Messner, Michael A. (June 2011). "Gender ideologies, youth sports, and the production of soft essentialism". Sociology of Sport Journal. 28 (2). Human Kinetics Publishers: 151–170. doi:10.1123/ssj.28.2.151. Pdf.
- Messner, Michael (March 2011). "The privilege of teaching about privilege". Sociological Perspectives. 54 (1). SAGE: 3–13. doi:10.1525/sop.2011.54.1.3. JSTOR 10.1525/sop.2011.54.1.3. S2CID 145394584. Pdf.
- Messner, Michael A.; Cooky, Cheryl; Hextrum, Robin H. (September 2013). "Women play sport, but not on TV: a longitudinal study of televised news media". Communication & Sport. 1 (3). SAGE: 203–230. doi:10.1177/2167479513476947. S2CID 53321725. Pdf.

== See also ==
- Triad of Violence
- Jean-Marie Brohm
