= Roslyn Kerr =

Sport sociologist in New Zealand

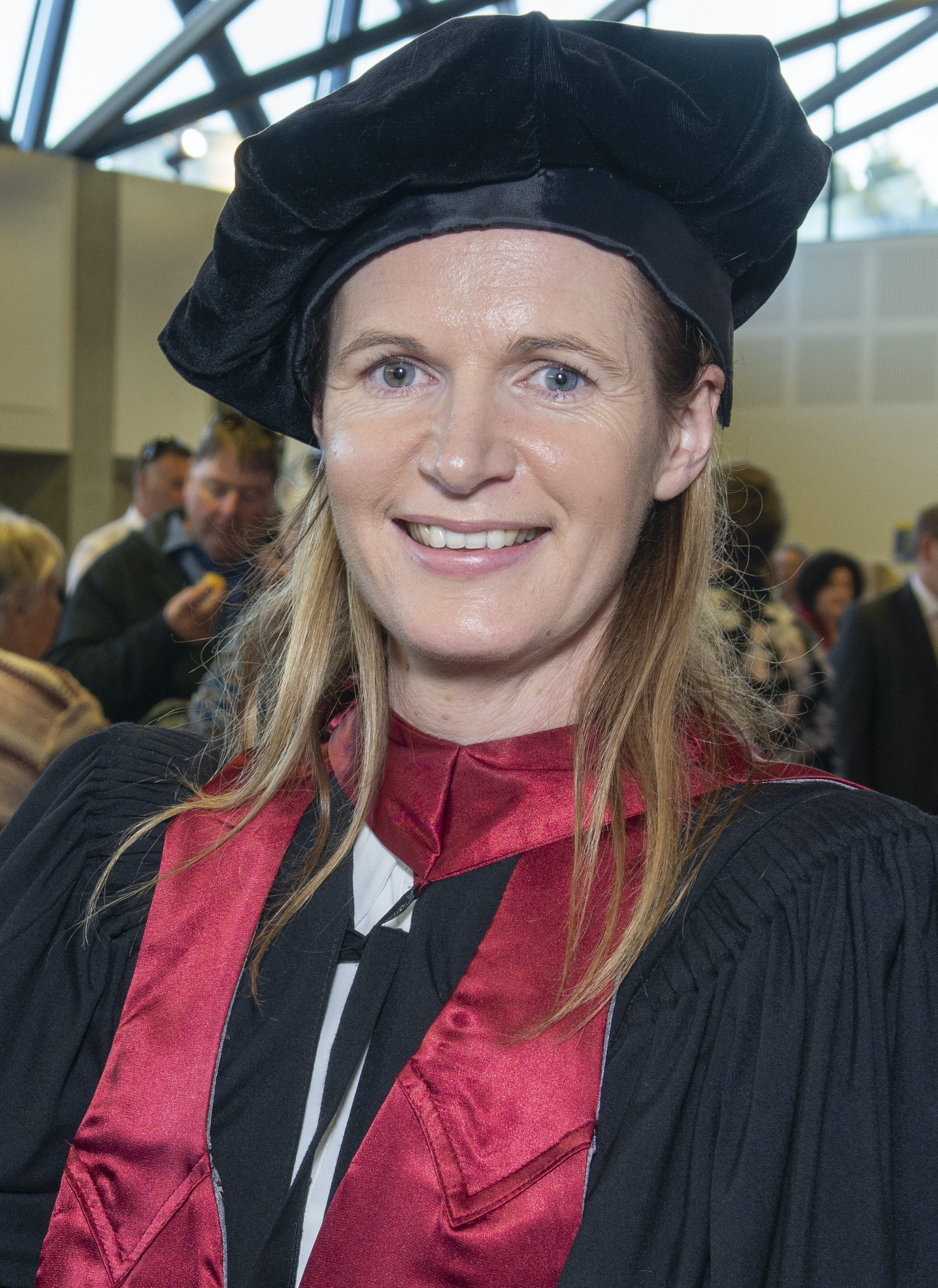
- Kerr in 2019

Academic background
- Education: University of Canterbury
- Thesis: Assembling high performance: an actor network theory account of gymnnastics in New Zealand (2010)
- Doctoral advisor: Camilla Obel, Terence Bert Austrin

Academic work
- Discipline: Sports sociology
- Institutions: Lincoln University, Christchurch City Council

Roslyn Fiona Kerr is a New Zealand sports sociologist and parks manager. She is an adjunct professor at Lincoln University, specialising in sports sociology. In 2023 she joined the Christchurch City Council as a parks manager.

== Academic career ==
Kerr completed a PhD titled Assembling high performance: an actor network theory account of gymnnastics in New Zealand at the University of Canterbury in 2010. She then joined the faculty of Lincoln University, where she was promoted to full professor in 2022. From 2015 to 2018, she was the head of the Department of Tourism, Sport and Society, and following that was appointed dean of the Faculty of Environment, Society and Design. Kerr also convened the university's Living Laboratory, which is a collaboration between academia and land-sector partners such as industry, Māori organisations, government and schools to allow students to have real-world experience to test ideas. The laboratory has worked on revitalising the university's arboretum, testing ideas about science in dairy farming, and land use and policy around restoration at Mt Hutt Forest and Bike Park. Kerr's research focuses on gymnastics and actor–network theory in sport. Her work on gender in sport has gained worldwide attention, and has been featured in the New York Times and Nature Outlook. She has written or edited three books.

== Parks leadership ==
In 2023, Kerr joined the New Zealand Parks Leaders Forum, and took a role as parks, programmes and partnerships manager in the Parks Unit of Christchurch City Council. At this point she became an adjunct professor at Lincoln University.

== Awards and honours ==
In 2013, Kerr won a teaching excellence award for teaching innovation, and in 2018 she was awarded a Principal award for excellence in teaching by Lincoln University.

== Selected works ==
- Kerr, Roslyn (2016). Sport and technology: An actor-network theory perspective. Manchester University Press. ISBN 978-1-78499-799-1. OL 35552448M. Wikidata Q123466220.
- Caroline Depatie; Kerr, Roslyn; Espiner, Stephen (2016). "Experiencing outdoor recreation in the digital technology age: a case study from the Port Hills of Christchurch, New Zealand". Routledge. ISBN 978-1-315-66660-0. Wikidata Q123466221.
- Mick Grimley; Trond Nilsen; Kerr, Roslyn; Richard Green; David Thompson (2010). "Virtual Worlds for Science Learning". Wikidata Q123466222 https://www.igi-global.com/gateway/chapter/www.igi-global.com/gateway/chapter/39406.
- Kerr, Roslyn (2014). "From Foucault to Latour: Gymnastics Training as a Socio-Technical Network". Sociology of Sport Journal. 31 (1): 85–101. doi:10.1123/ssj.2013-0015. Wikidata Q123459838.
- Natalie Barker-Ruchti; Schubring, Astrid; Outi Aarresola; Kerr, Roslyn; Karin Grahn; Jenny McMahon (2017). "Producing success: a critical analysis of athlete development governance in six countries". International Journal of Sport Policy and Politics. 10 (2): 215–234. doi:10.1080/19406940.2017.1348381. Wikidata Q123459829.
- Natalie Barker-Ruchti; Kerr, Roslyn; Schubring, Astrid; Cervin, Georgia Rae; Myrian Nunomura (2016). ""Gymnasts Are Like Wine, They Get Better With Age": Becoming and Developing Adult Women's Artistic Gymnasts". Quest. 69 (3): 348–365. doi:10.1080/00336297.2016.1230504. Wikidata Q123459833.
- Kerr, Roslyn; Gretchen Kerr (2020). "Promoting athlete welfare: A proposal for an international surveillance system". Sport Management Review. 23 (1): 95–103. doi:10.1016/j.smr.2019.05.005. Wikidata Q123459828.
- Kerr, Roslyn; C. Obel (2017). "Reassembling sex: reconsidering sex segregation policies in sport". International Journal of Sport Policy and Politics. 10 (2): 305–320. doi:10.1080/19406940.2017.1406976. Wikidata Q123459830.
- Kerr, Roslyn (14 January 2018). "Why it might be time to eradicate sex segregation in sports". The Conversation.

== See also ==
- Abuse in gymnastics
