= International Journal of Sports Marketing & Sponsorship =

- Discipline: Business and management, Sociology of sport
- Language: English

Publication details
- History: 1999–present
- Publisher: Emerald Group Publishing
- Frequency: Quarterly

Standard abbreviations
- ISO 4: Int. J. Sports Mark. Spons.

Indexing
- ISSN: 1464-6668

Links
- Journal homepage

The International Journal of Sports Marketing & Sponsorship is a quarterly peer-reviewed academic journal covering issues related to the marketing of sports that was established in 1999. Since 2004 it has been published by International Marketing Reports. The journal is abstracted and indexed by PsycINFO and the Social Sciences Citation Index. It is currently published by the Emerald Publishing Group.

== Special issues ==
The journal has published special issues on such subjects as football (soccer), technology, Olympics, NASCAR, and scandal & corruption in sport, as well as issues featuring specific markets such as Australia/New Zealand and Latin America.

== Editors ==
Past editors of the journal are:

- 2008: Michel Desbordes
- 2004: Simon Chadwick
- 2002: David Shani
- 1999: John Amis
