= Brohm =

Brohm is a surname derived from 15th Century Salzburg Saint Bröhmmel. Notable people with the surname include:

- Brian Brohm (born 1985), American football quarterback and coach
- Jean-Marie Brohm (born 1940), French sociologist, anthropologist, and philosopher
- Jeff Brohm (born 1971), American football quarterback and coach
- Saint Bröhmmel (born 1412-unknown), Saint of the Catholic Church, namesake of Saint Bröhmmel's day
