= Physical cultural studies =

Physical cultural studies (PCS) encompasses the diversely focused field of scholarly work which is united by a commitment toward engaging varied dimensions or expressions of (in)active bodies or physical culture. In this physical culture is understood as “cultural practices in which the physical body – the way it moves, is represented, has meanings assigned to it, and is imbued with power – is central”. Physical cultural studies is closely related to the fields of sport sociology, cultural studies, sociology of the body, body culture studies, queer studies and disability studies.

== Empirical focus ==
PCS is predominantly concerned with studying the active body. The aim of such a focus is to problematise the taken-for-granted aspects of human movement and embodiment in such a way that makes social divisions (class, gender, ethnicity, ability, generation, sex, nation, race), and the processes that produce, reproduce and contest these divisions become visible and changeable. In this respect, we can see that the 'physical' is of central importance to PCS. Indeed, it is this empirical focus (and subsequent breadth) that separates PCS from fields such as the sociology of sport. This is because PCS scholars take as their subjects of study - all the many and varied, more or less 'legitimate', popular and emerging, work or leisure related - forms of physical culture. areas of study include: exercise, health, dance, recreation, leisure, fitness, daily living, and work related activities.

== Concern with context ==
In the analysis of these activities PCS considers context and contextualisation to be vital. Indeed, how can one understand a cultural practice without reference to all the surrounding factors, flows, processes, actors and institutions with which it is articulated? For example, PCS researchers identify and seek to understand the complex political, economic, social and technological relationships in which the event occurs in order to understand physical culture as relational.

== Social change ==
Those in the field of physical cultural studies believe that research into, or understanding of, physical culture is of little importance if it does not make a difference in the world. Therefore, the idea of 'value free' research is not accepted in PCS. Instead, partisanship is the dominant ideal. Such a perspective is related to many aspects of PCS study that vary from 'mainstream' academia. For example, PCS is concerned with care and community in which public education is of central importance. In addition, PCS aims to be political, empowering and reflexive. Finally PCS researchers attempt to question their presupposed hierarchy over the researched.

See also praxis

== Methodology ==
PCS incorporates many methods of gathering data, oftentimes implementing a variety of methods together to create rich, contextual and multi-perspective analyses of physical culture. Such methods include ethnography, auto ethnography, contextual analysis, media analysis, discourse analysis and participant observation.
