= Triad of Violence =

The triad of violence is a sociological theory that originates from political scientist Michael Kaufman and was elaborated on by sociologist Michael Messner. The triad of violence consists of violence against other men, violence against themselves and violence against women.

== Violence Against Other Men ==
This refers to the idea that sports encourages athletes to be act rough against opponents. Rituals such as hazing are also example of such violence against other men. These rituals focus on suppressing empathy as a form of masculinity.

== Violence Against Themselves ==
This refers to the idea of athletes being tough and being able to play through pain. Corporations such as Nike perpetuate this notion that the body is a machine. This is best exemplified by instances where athletes injure themselves but still continue playing despite severe injuries. The high injury rate of athletes are both indicators of male athletes violence against themselves and other men.

== Violence Against Women ==
This refers to instances of rape conducted by male athletes. Messner emphasizes that the majority of male athletes do not participate in violence against women. An example of this would be the 2006 Duke University lacrosse team scandal. Messner argues that situations like this are an expression of masculinity through sexual aggression. However, all allegations have been dropped on the athletes.

== Michael Kaufman ==
Michael Kaufman originally came up with the phrase Triad of Violence. He further breaks down the analysis of men's violence in sports as the 6 P's.

These are

patriarchal power: which states that violence has been related with male power. Violence then becomes about maintaining power

sense of privilege: is the feeling that one is entitled to commit violence.

paradox of men's power: is that violence has become a source of power and a source of fear for men.

psychic armor: which argues that violence is men's way of achieving emotional distance.

psychic pressure cooker: masculinity has been directly tied to bottling up of emotions. Only anger has been considered a valid male emotion

past experience: the past experiences of men affect their attitudes towards violence. i.e. growing up in a violent household will teach a young boy that violence is an accepted part of life.
