= Abuse in gymnastics =

A variety of forms of abuse have been reported in gymnastics, including physical, emotional, and sexual abuse. Abuse has been reported in multiple countries including Australia, Brazil, Canada, France, Portugal, the United Kingdom, and the United States.

== Australia ==
The gymnastics community in Australia has been impacted by a long-standing history of abuse, and the failure of authorities to take appropriate action when concerns were raised leading to the protection of the abuse at a systemic level.

=== 1995 - Opie report ===
In 1995, the Women's Artistic Gymnastics (WAG) program at the Australian Institute of Sport (AIS) faced accusations of abuse, with Coach Mark Calton being accused of hitting a 10 year old gymnast, with two other girls stating that their coach used emotional abuse calling them "fat" and "ugly". Within the same year, a former AIS gymnast filed a lawsuit against the Australian Sports Commission (ASC), alleging that the training regime at the AIS had caused her to suffer from anorexia nervosa, an eating disorder condition. As a result, Sports Minister John Faulkner commissioned an independent investigation to examine these allegations of physical and psychological abuse, conducted by sports lawyer, Hayden Opie.

This subsequent report, known as the Opie report, claimed that the physical assault of the 10 year old gymnast by her coach had resulted after the gymnast "provoked Calton into losing his self-control", but ultimately did not find he had struck her with Opie recommending counselling for the coach - not the gymnast - and dismissed the emotional abuse as the terms "fat" and "ugly" were often use in high-performance training centres such as the AIS environment. Ultimately, the Opie report concluded "No systematic or widespread abuse of AIS female gymnasts has been found to occur at any time. Major change at the AIS is not necessary.".

However, this inquiry has been criticised for being constrained by a narrow framework that did not address the broader issues present in the sport, resulting in the report providing recommendations that treated the symptoms rather than tackling the underlying problems and further legitimising and approving of the activities occurring that had upset parents and athletes. Critics also pointed out that "All parties involved in the sport of gymnastics had an interest in containing any perceived problems that might threaten the sport."

=== 2003 - Geoffery Robert Dobbs trial and sentencing ===
In July 2003, gymnastics coach Geoffery Robert Dobbs was formally sentenced for life in jail with no prospect of parole on charges of molesting and producing child sexual abuse material of 62 girls aged from 12 months to 15 years old between 1972 and 1999. Detectives believed that in total, he may have abused more than 300 girls, leaving up to 240 alleged victims unaccounted for. His victims included athletes whom he had obtained access to through his role as a gymnastics coach.

=== 2013 - Belooussov coach suspension ===
In 2021, the Australian Institute of Sport (AIS) responded to enquiries by the ABC to confirm the 2013 suspension of husband and wife coaches, Sasha and Olga Belooussov, for an 18-month period for the verbal abuse of a gymnast.

This suspension had remained unreported for eight years due to the complaint handling process by Gymnastics Australia (GA), which had meant that those involved, including the verbally abused gymnast and GA, were barred from speaking due to confidentiality provisions.

Despite this period of suspension, the Belooussov couple returned to coaching gymnastics in Australia, returning to their roles as personal coaches for Georgia Godwin (Australian Commonwealth Games and Olympian medalist), GA assistant coach, coaching at Queensland gymnastics club Delta Gymnastics, and winning the GA WAG International Coach/Coaching Team of the Year Award in 2019.

=== 2018 - National Centre of Excellence investigation ===
During January 2018, the gymnastics world was exposed to the horrors of abuse in gymnastics as the Larry Nassar abuse trial played out publicly, raising awareness of child safety in sports, particularly within gymnastics, with victim Aly Raisman urging sporting bodies to ensure safeguards to ensure the mistakes of the United States were not repeated.

In response to the Larry Nassar case, Gymnastics Australia (GA) CEO Kitty Chiller made a statement regarding how the USA scandal had prompted GA to carry out an audit of their processes and policies, including an education process to empower "any young member or any member of a gymnastics association to know that they have a voice and to know where that voice will be heard." Kitty Chiller denied that GA had an existing problem with child abuse, stating "there's never been any evidence or complaints that anyone's been unhappy within the Gymnastics Australia environment" and GA's audit did not uncover any practices that needed to be changed.

However, within the same year, parents reported to Gymnastics Australia that their children as young as eight were being regularly verbally and physically abused at the GA National Centre of Excellence (NCE) in Melbourne.

In these complaints, parents alleged their children were punished via methods such as "making them swing on the bar until their hands bled, doing squats until their knees gave out, or making them do handstands and stay upside down until they felt sick and fell over" with punishments being given for any misdemeanour from being perceived as not paying attention or being cheeky to not performing to the coach's standards. Athletes were also allegedly regularly yelled at multiple times within a training session, and not being allowed to comfort one another, with training sessions being closed to parents despite medical appointments occurring during training sessions. ABC News confirmed 16 parents, with the majority of their children being under the age of 15 years old and spending between 20 and 33 hours a week training at the NCE.

When the parents took their complaints formally to GA, GA appointed an independent investigator in May. However, after receiving an interim report from the independent investigator, GA closed the investigation in August, with a letter from Kitty Chiller to the parents citing that the majority of allegations were "incomplete" and "based on the investigator's interim report, GA did not find that any staff member was in breach of their employment with GA". This letter also stated that "the investigation took longer than anticipated and an extension would likely increase the burden placed on all parties involved" with no fault or wrongdoing being concluded.

George Tatai, who spent 21 years on the GA board and eight years as a member of the International Gymnastics Federation, holding an Order of Australia Medal for his work in the sport, spoke out against the way that GA handled this investigation stating that they were paying lip-service to the parents' concerns and protecting GA ahead of the athletes.

"It [Gymnastics Australia] seems to have morphed into an organisation that is protecting the organisation ahead of the interest of the athletes and the community."

— George Tatai, "National Centre of Excellence inflicting cruel 'punishments' on child gymnasts, parents allege", ABC News, 2018

One of the mothers then went on to make a formal complaint in 2020, using the newly formed GA independent complaints process, the "Supplementary Complaints Management Process" (SCMP), to allege that Kitty Chiller should not have closed this investigation as the CEO of Gymnastics Australia at the time. This 2020 complaint was then closed and never investigated, being deemed out of scope as the SCMP limited valid complaints to only those involving direct conduct towards an athlete, therefore excluding officials who may have handled historical complaints or had knowledge of abuse from investigation under this process.

However new information was discovered in 2022 in Senate Estimates that found that the SCMP was co-drafted by those within Kitty Chiller's office, with GA providing input into the policy's design instead of the process being fully independent.

When the SCMP policy was announced in 2020, Sport Integrity Australia (SIA) and the National Sports Tribunal (NST) had released a media statement confirming they would play a key role in the SCMP policy, with SIA facilitating an independent and comprehensive assessment of individual complaints and assisting with the management and coordination of investigation in accordance with assessor recommendations while NST planned to provide mediation, conciliation and tribunal hearings as needed.

With the release of this information within the Senate Estimates, ABC News began an investigation to explore who had made the decision to exclude officials from investigations under the SCMP, resulting in SIA, NST and GA all making conflicting statements to the ABC reporters. SIA stated that it was GA who was ultimately responsible for the SCMP, with the policy being developed by the NST for the board of GA to provide approval with SIA's input being only on sections relevant to their role. The NST statement stated that SCMP was a GA policy, and as such, GA was involved in its development up to board level, noting that both SIA and the NST assisted GA in its development. Meanwhile, however, GA distanced itself completely from the policy, stating that the policy " was developed by the NST, with input from SIA, in relation to their role in the process. This policy was endorsed by the Gymnastics Australia Board."

=== 2020-2021 Gymnastics Australia abuse investigation ===
In 2020, the documentary film Athlete A was released, following investigative journalists as they broke the story of USA Gymnastics team doctor Larry Nassar sexually assaulting young female gymnasts, and the following allegations and trials around USA Gymnastics regarding the abuse they had suffered.

In the aftermath of the documentary release, dozens of Australian gymnasts took to social media to speak their own allegations of abuse within Australian gymnastics, exposing that the culture wasn't unique to gymnastics within the U.S. As a result, Gymnastics Australia (GA) announced an independent review into its own culture and practices, stating "those experiences are simply not acceptable." For this review, GA requested the Australian Human Rights Commission (AHRC) to act as the independent body to ensure the integrity of the review, with the report completed in 2021.

This report was undertaken by a dedicated team of AHRC staff, led by the Sex Discrimination Commission with input from the National Children's Commissioner, who all had expertise in responding sensitively in a trauma informed way to a range of issues such as sexual assault, sexual harassment and abuse. The original planned release date was within the first quarter of 2021, however due to the community interest in the review, AHRC extended the consultation timeline to allow more participation with the review.

Participation opened in September 2020, with all past and present members of the gymnastics community in Australia including athletes, coaches, staff, volunteers and administrators being encouraged to participate through a series of focus groups, interviews and written submissions. Policies and procedures were also reviewed, alongside the way these policies and procedures were implemented with the governance structures surrounding these.

During the undertaking of investigation, athletes spoke out about the abusive techniques used in gymnastics training to the media with lawyers forming groups to consider taking legal action, as the athletes stated that the Australian Institute of Sport (AIS) had ignored allegations of physical and psychological abuse for decades.

AHRC received 138 written submissions to the enquiry, with 47 interviews being conducted with 57 participants included current and former athletes, their families, staff, coaches and other relevant personnel.

AHRC launched the final version of the report on May 3, 2021. This report uncovered an environment where winning was focused on at all costs, normalising abuse due to the lack of understanding and prevention of the full range of child abuse and neglect behaviours in gymnastics, with a governance structure set up in an unsuitable manner for effective child safeguarding.

The five overarching key findings of the report were:

- "Current coaching practices create a risk of abuse and harm to athletes. Additionally, hiring practices for coaching staff lack accountability and there are inconsistent policies and systems to regulate their behaviour."
- "There is an insufficient focus on understanding and preventing the full range of behaviours that can constitute child abuse and neglect in gymnastics."
- "A focus on ’winning-at-all-costs’ and an acceptance of negative and abusive coaching behaviours has resulted in the silencing of the athlete voice and an increased risk of abuse and harm with significant short and long-term impacts to gymnasts."
- "There is an ongoing focus in gymnastics on the ‘ideal body’, especially for young female athletes. This, in addition to inappropriate and harmful weight management and body shaming practices, can result in the development of eating disorders and disordered eating which continue long after the athlete has left the sport."
- "Gymnastics at all levels has not appropriately and adequately addressed complaints of abuse and harm and are not effectively safeguarding children and young people. Contributing factors include a lack of internal expertise and resources and complicated governance structures."

A total of 12 recommendations were also made as a result of this review, including:

1. "Transform education to skills development for coaches"
2. "Strengthen coach engagement and accountability"
3. "Develop a national social media policy"
4. "Broaden the sport’s understanding of child abuse and neglect"
5. "Encourage and promote athlete empowerment and participation"
6. "Provide a formal acknowledgement and apology to all members of the gymnastics community in Australia who have experienced any form of abuse in the sport"
7. "Develop a skills-based training and support program for all athletes to prevent and address eating disorders and disordered eating"
8. "Develop and refine resources relating to body image, weight management practices and eating disorders, to improve consistency and support effective implementation"
9. "All matters regarding child abuse and neglect, misconduct, bullying, sexual harassment, and assault be investigated externally of the sport"
10. "Establish interim and ongoing oversight over relevant complaints at all levels of the sport"
11. "Establish a toll-free triage, referral and reporting telephone service operated by SIA"
12. "Align current governance with Sport Australia’s Sport Governance Principles more consistently and effectively"

During this review, Sport Integrity Australia (SIA) was recommended by AHRC as the appropriate independent body to which abuse allegations in sport should be made, with SIA receiving 35 abuse allegations resulting in seven investigations which remained ongoing after the report's release. In response to the investigation, SIA introduced their National Integrity Framework for all sports in Australia in March 2021, including an independent complaints handling model for all sports which they encouraged all sports to adopt to ensure the independent and transparent handling of complaints moving forward. By the end of 2022, the Framework and the policies under it had been adopted by 81 recognised National Sports Organisations (NSO) in Australia, and adoption of the Framework and its policies was a requirement by any sporting organisation applying to be an ASC/Sport Australia recognised NSO.

Nonetheless, the introduction of the National Integrity Framework as the independent body for complaints saw controversy, with concerns were raised about a conflict of interest held by the SIA NST CEO, John Boultbee. John Boultbee was the director of the AIS from 1995 to 2001, overseeing a wide range of sports under the AIS banner, leading to the potential for a conflict of interest, that John himself acknowledged, if there were any hearings held for complaints regarding his time at the AIS. However, John stated that in the event there were any matter that related to his time at the AIS, he would recuse himself from any role in the complaint. A further conflict of interest was raised in 2022, as GA CEO, Kitty Chiller, left her GA role to become deputy chief executive of the NST, however the NST confirmed that Kitty Chiller would have no involvement in any gymnastics matter that came to tribunal.

The AHRC report details that abuse was occurring within the AIS gymnastics programs as early as the 1980s, not long after the AIS was established. ASC followed recommendation 6, releasing an apology statement to AIS athletes and setting up an independent and confidential support service called "AIS Be Heard" which was available to any former AIS athletes and staff members to link with existing support services. The AIS then launched a restoration payment scheme, offering former athletes payments ranging from $5000 to a maximum of $50,000 if they suffered abuse during their time as scholarship holders between 1981 and 2013 as well counselling and support services and the opportunity to engage with senior representatives from the ASC and AIS.

Gymnastics Australia also followed this recommendation, releasing a statement stating that it "unreservedly apologises to all athletes and family members who have experienced any form of abuse participating in the sport" and announcing its intention to adopt all 12 recommendations as overseen by their newly formed integrity committee.

During the course of the investigation in late 2020, GA stated in its 2020 annual report that it had formally commenced the on-boarding process of signing up to the National Redress Scheme, a scheme designed to assist people who have experienced institutional child sexual abuse gain access to counselling, a personal response and redress payment. However, it had not yet formally joined this scheme by November 2022, with gymnasts speaking out regarding this broken promise.

In March 2022, GA CEO, Kitty Chiller, left her role at Gymnastics Australia to become deputy CEO of the National Sports Tribunal, where she would have no involvement in any gymnastics matters that came before the NST.

=== 2021 - 2022 - Sports Integrity Australia investigations and Gymnastics Australia restorative engagement program ===
During the course of the Australian Human Rights Commission (AHRC) investigation, Sport Integrity Australia (SIA) was recommended as the appropriate independent body where abuse allegations within Australian sport should be reported. At the conclusion of the AHRC report, SIA had received 35 abuse allegation complaints within the four month window that had been open for this, however only seven were assessed as worthy of an investigation that was ongoing after the release of the AHRC report. Four of the complaints were then returned with a finding of "neither substantiated or unsubstantiated", with the findings letter reminding complainants to maintain confidentiality with the families stating that they felt the process had let them down with their complaints not being properly heard or judged.

Further action was then taken by Gymnastics Australia in 2022, with the launch of their Restorative Engagement Program in early 2022. This program was designed to provide a platform for individuals and groups to formally convey their personal experiences and inform prospective changes to procedures, guidelines and behaviours within Gymnastics Australia control. All athletes and their families who had made a formal complaint as part of the SCMP policy facilitated by SIA and NST in 2020 were invited to take part in this program, with participation being voluntary. This program was however condemned by the female gymnasts and their families as Gymnastics Australia asked them to sign a non-disclosure agreement (NDA) as part of their participance while GA had not yet publicly acknowledged any of the abuse complaints handled by SIA after the AHRC's report release.

=== 2021 - 2022 - Western Australian Institute of Sport (WAIS) investigation ===
As part of the Australian Human Rights Commission (AHRC) review of gymnastics, a group of 20 former Western Australian Institute of Sport (WAIS) gymnasts signed a joint submission regarding the physical, emotional and psychological abuse that was part of the training culture at WAIS. These gymnasts then participated in an ABC investigation regarding this abuse, which led to WAIS to self-refer these allegations for investigation to Sport Integrity Australia (SIA) in April 2021.

In early May 2021, in response to the release of the AHRC gymnastics report, WAIS board chair, Neil McLean released an apology statement, with former WAIS gymnasts criticising this the apology as weak, tokenistic, disingenuous and downplaying their abusive experiences:

"On behalf of the WAIS board and management we offer our sincere apologies to any person who has experienced distress or injury associated with their participation in the WAIS gymnastics program."

— Neil McLean, Western Australian Institute of Sport Board Chair

In June 2021, SIA confirmed that they would independently investigate the abuse allegations from WAIS gymnasts, seeking to understand the culture of the WAIS program from its period of operation from 1987 to 2016 and examine the athletes' experience of abuse and harm along with the institute's current child safe policies and procedures and their effectiveness. All athletes, families, staff, coaches and personnel who participated in the WAIS WAG program were invited to make submissions, with WAIS chief executive, Steve Lawrence, removing himself from any involvement in the review to avoid a conflict of interest.

The investigation included interviews and written submissions from 92 participants and the examination of over 15,000 pages of documentation, with the final report being handed down in April 2022. This report found that "it was reasonably likely that some gymnasts suffered abuse and/or harm while participating in the Program at WAIS. This includes things such as verbal and physical abuse, unnecessary skinfold testing, weight-shaming, the expectation to train and compete with injuries, and extreme training loads. The Review also found that the policies and procedures that governed the Program did not adequately protect some of the gymnasts."

Four recommendations were handed down as part of this report, which included:

1. "On the grounds that there was no effective complaint process for gymnasts to raise concerns, Sport Integrity Australia recommended that WAIS adopt the National Integrity Framework and the associated independent complaint handling process.
2. On the basis that some of the practices were inappropriate for children, Sport Integrity Australia recommended that WAIS ensure that all sports programs involving children are child-focused and age appropriate.
3. In recognition of the importance of athlete welfare and the risk of potential long-term harm to athletes, Sport Integrity Australia recommended that WAIS continue to embed athlete wellbeing into policies, procedures and practices in all sport programs.
4. In recognition of the harm and/or abuse reasonably likely to have been suffered by some gymnasts, Sport Integrity Australia recommended that WAIS, in collaboration with the impacted gymnasts, engage in a restorative and reconciliatory process."

Former WAIS gymnasts responded to the report stating that the recommendation that they received an apology for the abuse did not go far enough, with calls for the state government and national sporting peak body to hold those who were responsible accountable with further consequences. The Gymnast Alliance Australia (GAA) also released a statement responding to the report, criticising WAIS downplaying the allegations as being historical, with abuse occurring as recently as six years prior to the report's release and also calling for the Western Australian Government and Gymnastics Australia to hold those responsible accountable with independent investigations.

WAIS responded to the report with another public apology, stating "We are sorry that your experiences were painful rather than enjoyable and we apologise that elements of the WAIS program failed you. To those who experienced abuse and harm we apologise. Sport, elite sport included, is meant to be a healthy and enjoyable experience. We are sorry that this was not your experience." This apology was critiqued upon its release for also included the statement "Can we also note that SIA referred a number of allegations of sexual abuse and/or physical abuse to the relevant authorities who had the jurisdiction to investigate these allegations but none of these allegations progressed to investigation or charges and all have been closed".

In June 2022, the Western Australian government issued a formal apology to WAIS gymnasts who had suffered abuse and mistreatment, with Sport and Recreation Minister David Templeman directing the department to undertake a comprehensive governance and culture review of WAIS and the formation of a Specialist Child Safeguarding Unit for sport. It was also announced that the WA Government Department of Sport and Recreation would also oversee and audit WAIS's compliance and implementation of the recommendations in the SIA report.

In May 2023, WAIS released a second apology, acknowledging that their April 2022 apology fell short as they prepared to participate in the recommended Reconciliatory and Restorative Process. The WAIS board also released a public commitment on the same day that included the updated apology and details on how WAIS was committing to acting in the best interests of athlete health, wellbeing and safety.

=== 2021 - 2022 - Northern Districts Gymnastics Club controversy ===
In 2021, Sports Integrity Australia (SIA) referred an investigation that was conducted as part of the SCMP policy investigations to the Western Australian policy, resulting in detectives laying charges in March 2021 regarding incidents involving a former gymnastics coach between February 2019 and December 2020 while he was coaching at the Northern Districts Gymnastics Club.

While these charges were discontinued in June 2022 by the Office of the Director of Public Prosecutions, the Northern Districts Gymnastics Club came under fire during the course of the case for not informing parents of the allegations or case, a decision the club defended despite a parent removing their child and speaking out to the media.

The Northern Districts Gymnastics Club stated that once they became aware of the allegations, they sought immediate advice from authorities and stood the coach down with full pay, later terminating the coach's employment. The parent stated that they felt the club should have stated that allegations and charges had been made, the club was working with police, and given information about how to broach the subject with their children to ensure nothing had happened to their child.

=== 2022 - Peggy Liddick sanctions ===
In early 2022, the National Sport Tribunal (NST) found Peggy Liddick, who had acted as the Australian women's artistic gymnastics team coach and boss from 1997 to 2016, guilty of harassing gymnast Georgia Bonora.

While Peggy Liddick had denied the allegations of bullying and emotional abuse, Georgia Bonora's complaint had been supported by her former Australian teammates, Shona Morgan, Olivia Vivian, Chloe Gilliland and Ashleigh Brennan.

The complaint was initially lodged with Gymnastics Australia (GA), before being referred to Sports Integrity Australia (SIA) in September 2020, containing allegations of misconduct, bullying and abuse between 2006 and 2012. Upon review, SIA upheld five allegations against Peggy Liddick, with an appeal application to have the matter heard by the NST seeing a further three allegations dismissed with two allegations being upheld.

As a result of the NST hearing, Peggy Liddick was suspended for four months and ordered to write an apology to Georgia Bonora:

"Dear Georgia,

Pursuant to Order 5 of the National Sports Tribunal Determination dated 18 January 2022, as directed by the Tribunal, I apologise to you and acknowledge that I engaged in unacceptable coaching behaviours, in particular the use of negative language which was belittling, offensive and humiliating and cause great upset to you. Kind regards

Peggy Liddick"

— Peggy Liddick, Apology to Georgia Bonora

== Brazil ==
In 2016, gymnastics coach Fernando de Carvalho Lope was removed as national coach a month before Brazil hosted the 2016 Olympics after being accused of abusing two male athletes, aged 12 and 13 years old. He was also removed from his role as coach for the Clube MESC community center team at the time of these allegations and shifted to an administrative role, removing all contact with athletes.

In 2018, Globo TV broke the news story that alleged that Lopes had abused 40 minor gymnasts, leading to a police investigation and formal charges being laid regarding four of these victims. However, the other athletes who made allegations participated in the police investigation as witnesses.

In 2019, Lopes was banned from coaching gymnastics within Brazil. However Lopes appealed this ban, obtaining an injunction in June 2020 to continue coaching. This injunction was overruled as unfounded in 2022, banning Lopes from the sport for life with no further appeal routes available to him.

Lopes was found guilty for the crime of rape of the vulnerable on four charges and sentenced to 109 years and 8 months in prison in 2022.

== Canada ==
Over many years, many different serious allegations of abuse and misconduct have been raised with Canadian gymnastics.

=== Judy Howard-Holmes ===
Following multiple abuse complaints launched in 2022, Holmes was suspended from all activities as of December 19, 2024 for 1 year, with 1 year probation if reinstated.

=== Jamie Atkin ===
In 2017, two coaches made formal complaints to the Alberta Gymnastics Federation (AGF) alleging that coach Jamie Atkin had an inappropriate relationship with a gymnast he coached at Airdrie Edge Gymnastics, violating the code of conduct. This resulted in a suspension from AGF.

Atkin avoided a formal hearing, instead agreeing to a series of terms and conditions which included ceasing all unnecessary physical conduct with the athlete, not to spend any time with the gymnast at any gym without another person present until the end of June 2018 and then to maintain a professional coach-athlete relationship, completion of business management, ethics and healthy relationships courses, and an extension of his AGF suspension until July 15, 2018.

In March 2018, a parent made a complaint to AGF board chair Katie Biberdorf, and federation investigation lawyer, James Smelie, asking how the federation was ensuring these terms and conditions were being followed as there was no regulation regarding this. Biberdorf initially responded that it would be addressed with the highest priority with a report back as soon as possible, however the parent never heard back from Biberdorf again.

The former president of Aidrie Edge Gymnastics Club, Brady Dalcin, then filed a formal complaint against AGF in November 2022 over its decision to keep the sanctions that had been levied in 2018 secret, stating that all coach discipline information should be made public for athlete protection. Dalcin had been a board member of the club from September 2018 to September 2020 before being the gym's president from September 2020 to June 2021, with the sanctions happening eight months before Dalcin became a board member. Due to the secrecy of these sanctions, information regarding them had never been provided to incoming officials within the gym, and upon discovery of the complaint and information, none of the Airdrie board members could answer Dalcin whether Atkin had completed the courses he agreed to within the sanctions.

Jamie Atkin has now been fired from his position at Airdrie Edge Gymnastics Club after a Canada-wide ban of him coaching athletes under 18 years of age.

=== Scott McFarlane and subsequent investigation ===
In October 2017, Gymnastics Ontario suspended coach Scott McFarlane due to internal complaints, announcing this publicly on January 26, 2018, after McFarlane was charged with sexual offences against a 15 year old athlete he had been coaching. Following his arrest, it came to light that five years earlier in April 2013, parents of a 12 year old gymnast from Tumblers Gymnastics Centre had gone to Ottawa police with complaints of an inappropriate relationship, however no charges were laid due to the alleged victims refusing to cooperate with authorities.

While McFarlane was formally acquitted on the charges in November, 2022, Gymnastics Canada extended their suspension pending an internal review of the allegations.

The McFarlane case sparked an internal investigation in Canadian gymnastics in 2018 by Shearer Parnega, a Toronto law firm, which revealed a systematic pattern of GymCan failing to act on misconduct complaints back to 2012. The outcome report was deemed so confidential that sources who participated in the investigation had never seen a copy. GymCan was criticised for keeping this report secret in 2022, with critics stating that they were being complicit in the abuse by doing so.

=== Dave and Elizabeth Brubaker ===
In December 2017, Gymnastics Canada Team Canada Head Coach, Dave Brubaker, was charged with 10 offences regarding sexual abuse of athletes under his coach. As a result, he was placed on administrative leave by Gymnastics Canada before being suspended from the organisation entirely. When the trial started in October 2018, the charges had been reduced to one count of sexual assault and one count of sexual exploitation, which Brubaker plead not guilty to. In February 2019, Brubaker was acquitted of these charges, with the judge citing that the investigating police officer was too close to the complainant to conduct an unbiased investigation, with the lack of impartiality having a tangible impact on the Crown's case.

In January 2019, a Gymnastics Canada investigation began into Dave Brubaker's wife, Elizabeth, who was provisionally suspended from coaching after written complaints regarding the time in which she was an elite coach at Bluewater Gymnastics Club. GymCan CEO Ian Moss noted that some of these allegations were related to those against her husband. GymCan also began an internal investigation into the sexual abuse allegations against Dave Brubaker after his criminal proceedings case had concluded.

In 2019, a group of 11 gymnasts filed a complaint with Gymnastics Canada (GymCan) against Dave Brubaker. This became part of the ongoing investigations following his legal case, which stretched across three years in total. The disciplinary committee concluded that 54 of the allegations were credible, with Dave Brubaker being banned for life from coaching gymnastics in Canada. The investigations regarding Elizabeth Brubaker concluded with her suspension being extended until January 18, 2024, pending the completion of reinstatement conditions.

=== Michel Arsenault ===
Former gymnastics coach and founder of Champions Gymnastics gym, Michel Arsenault, was arrested in 2018 charged with two counts of sexual assault and three counts of assault relating to gymnasts he coached between 1983 and 1993, with two being minors at the time of the alleged sexual assaults. At the time of his arrest, he was forbidden from being in contact with plaintiffs and witnesses, and forbidden from taking either paid or volunteer employment if it involved having authority over a minor.

A stay of proceedings was granted in February 2021 ahead of the scheduled March 2021 trial, due to major issues with the notes of a police investigator regarding interviews and statements by complainants and witnesses, meaning a trial could not continue without greatly affecting the right of the accused to a fair and equitable trial.

The Quebec provincial police subsequently launched an administrative probe into the investigation, investigating all of the procedures surrounding the conduct of the investigation due to great concern of how it went wrong.

=== Alex Bard ===
In 2019, Gymnastics Canada released a statement stating that national WAG team coach, Alex Bard, had resigned from his position for personal reasons. However media reports soon claimed that Bard was pushed out, which was confirmed by other GymCan staff members including GymCan CEO, Ian Moss, who stated that Bard had failed to improve on repeated incidents of inappropriate behaviour.

However, in the aftermath, details were revealed that Bard had been known to kiss young gymnasts on the lips, including on televised sporting events, harassing female coaches and touching female gymnasts inappropriately such as on the buttocks, with a complaint being taken directly to Moss in 2017 before Bard was promoted from GymCan's high performance director to GymCan WAG head coach.

Bard admitted that Moss gave Bard a choice in May 2019 to either resign or face a formal investigation into the misconduct allegations, which has since been criticised as giving him the "easy way out".

Ian Moss defended his handling of the matter as GymCan CEO in 2023, stating that "allegations are not facts", stating that only one formal complaint was filed in regards to a contractual matter that did not need an investigation due to its nature.

Despite this, Bard continued to coach in various gyms in Canada as recently as Summer 2022 due to the lack of oversight and accountability by GymCan.

=== Rima Nikishin ===
In June 2019, Coach Rima Nikishin was placed on an indefinite lifetime suspension by the Alberta Gymnastics Federation after a Code of Conduct investigation, with the reciprocity agreement meaning that no provincial and territorial GymCan organisation allowing Nikishin membership until further notice. A reason for this suspension has never been provided by Alberta Gymnastics Federation, and it is in place to this day.

=== Lorie Henderson ===
In 2021, Gymnastics Canada faced criticism for sending coach Lorie Henderson to the Tokyo Olympic Games with the gymnastics team, despite multiple abuse complaints against her remaining unresolved.

These included two 2019 complaint regarding bullying behaviour and threatening language, with one including pressure to return to training prematurely after injury, as well as a 2020 complaint alleging refusal to allow a physiotherapist access to the training facility to help build a training plan for an injured athlete as well as emotional abuse of an athlete following a bad competition. Another parent also confirmed an unresolved complaint to Canadian media outlet TSN, but feared speaking publicly due to repercussions for her daughter who remained actively involved in the sport.

=== Elvira Saadi ===
In late 2020, Gymnastics Canada suspended well-known gymnastics coach Elvira Saadi pending an investigation into abuse claims. These complaints included emotional and psychological abuse including weight-based humiliation and encouragement of eating disorders.

=== Marcel Rene ===
On November 1, 2021, provincial organisation Gymnastics Ontario handed a lifetime suspension to gymnastics coach and gym owner, Marcel Rene, effective as of January 1, 2022. This suspension included all coaching and field of play activities, as well as operation of his gymnastics club, Champion Gymnastics, other than through his son, with Gymnastics Ontario stating that they had not been appraised of information suggesting there is any risk of harm in permitting Rene the brief period of time to remove himself from the operations of Champion Gymnastics.

At the time of his suspension, Rene gave media interviews stating that there was nothing nefarious about his suspension, that it did not regard Champion Gymnastics, and that Gymnastics Ontario and Rene had an agreement rider stating he could re-apply for membership with Gymnastics Ontario in three years time.

However, by November 4, 2021, Gymnastics Ontario handed down an effective immediately interim suspension in which Rene was no longer allowed to coach and train athletes, attend any competitive events or camps, communicate with or contact anyone linked to Champions Gymnastics in regard to any "Field of Play" or operational issues, or to be onsite at Champion Gymnastics when there were also staff onsite.

This also coincided with lawyer Jason Ward contacting the Peterborough Examiner at request of his clients, Kaylie Hengg and Tonya Kirkwood, in order to provide statements of civil claims regarding sexual harassment in the workplace at Champion Gymnastics and the results of the code of conduct and ethics investigation conducted by an independent third party on behalf of Gymnastics Ontario - the investigation that had resulted in the initial November 1 ban of Rene.

=== Wider Gymnastics Abusive Culture Investigation ===
In March 2022, an open letter that amassed over 400 signatures was sent to Sport Canada demanding a third party investigation into abuse allegations within gymnastics in Canada, with the Sports Minister vowing to conduct an independent investigation by late Spring. However, by May 2022, no action had been taken in this regard. At the time of this letter, a former member of GymCan's board of directors, Kim Shore, disclosed that she had received over 100 complaints from parents over the previous five years and described a coach who had physically and emotionally abused their athletes who was still working in Canada. This letter also earned the support of U.S. Judge, Rosemarie Aquilina, who presided over the Larry Nassar sexual abuse case, with Judge Aquilina sending the gymasts a three-minute video stating that she stood with the athletes and urging Sport Canada and the Sports Minister to instigate a third party investigation where athletes had a say and were involved in the process.

In May 2022, a class action lawsuit was launched against Gymnastics Canada and the provincial gymnastics bodies across Canada in B.C., Alberta, Saskatchewan, Manitoba, Ontario and Quebec, alleging negligence. in preventing and taking action on physical and sexual abuse within their programs.

In July 2022, an open letter was launched by Gymnasts for Change, an independent group representing more than 500 gymnasts, alleging that Gymnastics Canada failed to protect gymnasts from abuse and urging the Minister of Sport, Pascale St-Onge, to suspend funding and hold a third-party investigation, as this request had been ignored for months by GymCan, Sport Canada and the Government. In response to this letter, the Minister publicly stated that funding would be frozen pending GymCan's participation with the new Office of Sports Integrity Commissioner (OSIC), which was founded in June 2022 to address reports of abuse in sports.

GymCan announced that it had signed an agreement on October 21, 2022, to join the Canadian Federal program "Abuse-Free Sport", designed to prevent and address maltreatment in sport, with complaints then going through the new Office of the Sport Integrity Commissioner (OSIC) as an independent complaint investigator.

In June 2022, GymCan hired McLaren Global Sport Solutions to design a culture review for GymCan and analyse their safe sport policies and procedures.

This report was made public in January 2023, with more than 1000 voices in the Canadian gymnastics community providing feedback, with a total of 58 personal interviews being conducted with a total of 974 individuals responding across two surveys. This report found that abuse and maltreatment of gymnasts was most pronounced in women's artistic gymnastics and women's rhythmic gymnastics, with a total of 46 recommendations being made for the final culture review.

== France ==
In January 2023, the French Gymnastics Federation (FFG) suspended its national men's gymnastics team coach, Vitaly Marinitch, applying to the state as the formal employer for a termination of his employment citing "alcohol problems" and "inappropriate words", as well as fights regarding "ethical issues" and "all types of violence". Previously, Marinitch had been forced to resign in 2016 from USA Gymnastics for groping the wife of team member Steven Legendre on more than one occasion in 2014.

On May 4, 2023, the technical director of the Marseille-based French gymnastics center, Vincent Pateau, faced court charged with aggravated moral harassment between 2015 and 2021 against five underage athletes. While he was acquitted of two of the charges, he was convicted on three, leading to a six-month suspended prison sentence and a €10,000 fine. While the prosecution had requested fifteen months in prison suspended and a ban on coaching, no such ban was imposed at the time of sentencing. The court did not impose any ban on coaching, with the Ministry of Sports not imposing any such ban until mid-May

In mid-May 2023, Stade 2 broadcast former French gymnasts speaking out about harassment and violence within French gymnastics, as well as the results of a survey that they held which highlighted these on a wider scale.

In this program, six former athletes disclosed experiences of abuse, violence and harassment in their time in the French team, as well as a systemic disregard for the health and wellbeing of gymnasts as humans, treating them only as performance objects. Allegations included forced participation in training and demonstrations despite injuries, body shaming, pressure to lose weight through extreme diets leading to eating disorders and psychological violence, towards gymnasts who were minors at the time of the abuse.

One of the coaches mentioned in the testimonies had been previously denounced for abusive methods in Switzerland in 2007 before working with the French team, going on to be implicated by a Mexican gymnast in 2019 for similar allegations. He had not been under contract with the French Gymnastics Federation (FFG) since 2013 due to his results and behaviour being "not satisfactory".

In response to the allegations, French Sports Minister Amélie Oudéa-Castéra announced the opening of an investigation into these allegations, banning the technical director of the national gymnastics centre from practicing.

The FFG president, James Blateau, released a statement stating he was providing his "full support to the victims", and that an exceptional meeting of the federation's executive board had been called to discuss the measures to be taken.

A week after this broadcast, the Bouches-du-Rhône national gymnastics centre based in Marseille released a press statement announcing the closure of the centre on June 30, 2023, under the order of the FFG. This press release cited the trial of their technical director Vincent Plateau, the report from stage 2 and a particularly unstable financial situation as the reasons for their closure.

Another former coach of the Marseille centre, Pierre Ettel, is awaiting trial for moral harassment charges on November 7, 2023.

== Italy ==
In early November 2022, allegations of emotional abuse within Italian rhythmic gymnastics, due to a complaint being filed in Brescia with a prosecutor relating to the abuse of two young rhythmic gymnasts regarding their requirement to maintain a specific weight. This followed former national team members, Nina Corradini and Anna Basta, speaking out about their experiences of humiliation and extreme pressure regarding their weight while spending time at a rhythmic gymnastics academy.

Due to these allegations, Italy's sports authorities began an investigation, with Sports Minister Andrea Abodi stating that medals cannot justify inappropriate behaviour and expressing her concern regarding the treatment of young athletes by coaches. A meeting was held between Abodi and the president of Italy's Olympic Committee, Giovanni Malago, and the head of the Italian Gymnastic Federation, Gherado Tecchi. Tecchi emphasised the need to care for and protect young athletes in the sport, placing their wellbeing at the utmost importance.

Italian gymnasts attended the gymnastics federation meeting, demanding a "cultural revolution" in response to the revelations of psychological abuse, with another international gymnast speaking out against the violence and emotional abuse within the sport regarding eating and weight management. Tecchi announced an investigation into the claims would be conducted, urging coaches and athletes to provide testimony in the investigation.

On November 8, 2022, the head of the Italian Olympic Committee, Giovanni Malago, issued a public apology to the group of former gymnasts, stating anyone who made mistakes would face consequences. The Italian Gymnastics Federation (FGI) also issued an apology, stating it does not tolerate any form of abuse, was committed to the wellbeing of its members, and would be taking immediate action working with the Federal Prosecutor and Safeguarding Officer to conduct investigations.

In mid-January 2023, the Federation Internationale de Gymnastique (FIG) convened an emergency council to discuss the future of Emmanuela Maccarani, the technical director of Italy's national rhythmic gymnastics training centre, and her assistant, Olga Tishina, following allegations of abuse. Maccarani denied all allegations of abuse, stating the accusers were gymnasts who did not make it to the Olympics and that envy from other coaches may be behind the case, as the Monza prosecutor's office investigated Maccarani and Tishina for alleged mistreatment of gymnasts.

This meeting resulted in Maccarani being relieved of her role as the national rhythmic gymnastics technical director, being temporarily replaced by Gherado Tecchi, the president of the Italian Gymnastics Federation (FGI). However, the Tecchi confirmed that Maccarani would continue to serve as the Italian national team's head coach until a decision was made regarding the allegations of mistreatment under investigation by both sports and criminal authorities.

In late January 2023, Stefania Fogliata, a rhythmic gymnastics coach, was suspended from coaching due to allegations of abuse of eight athletes between the ages of 10 and 14 since 2017. Preliminary investigations found that the athletes were subjected to daily insults, humiliation and physical violence from Fogliata. Testimonies were gathered from 25 different individuals alleging abuse, including victims, colleagues, parents and witnesses. The investigation concluded in March 2023, with Fogliata being disqualified from coaching for a year, and the Nemesi Academy of Calcinato, which Fogliata founded and directs, being banned for eight months.

In March 2023, artistic gymnastics coach Eleonora Gatti faced precautionary suspension by the Federal Court while awaiting trial for criminal charges relating to allegations of inappropriate behaviour towards underage athletes, both verbal and physical, and stalking. However this ban was removed in June after the testimony of four of Gatti's current athlete students who denied being ever subjected to harassment or ill-treatment. All allegations were denied by Gatti, with Gatti's criminal trial scheduled to take place in October 2023.

== New Zealand ==
In late July 2020, Gymnastics New Zealand (GNZ) responding to the growing global focus on the mistreatment of gymnastics and allegations of abuse from Australian gymnasts by taking steps to address the issue within New Zealand. GNZ CEO Tony Compier announced the establishment of a Safe Sport email function to report abuse directly to GNZ and the formation of an athlete-based advisory group to inform GNZ's work on athlete safety and wellbeing.

Shortly after these measures were put in place, Stuff.co.nz released an investigative journalism piece on August 1, 2020, detailing serious allegations of psychological and physical abuse from former elite New Zealand gymnasts. These allegations spanned across both club and international levels, describing issues such as lifelong injuries, reliance on painkillers, anxiety and ongoing management of eating disorders. This report exposed a culture associated with weight, serious injuries, overtraining, emotional abuse from coaches and sexual inappropriateness from male judges. GNZ acknowledge the need for improvements, launching urgent investigations in response to the allegations, as concerns began to be expressed by the New Zealand Olympic Committee and Sport New Zealand.

Around the same time, parents of young gymnasts at the North Harbour Gymnastics Club came forward publicly with allegations of abuse, overtraining and fat-shaming within the program. These claims included incidents of self-harm, injured athletes being forced to train, verbal abuse, and attempts to cover up abusive behaviour. The parents started that normalisation of low-level abuse within competitive gymnastics culture had led to a fear of speaking out publicly before this point. An investigation was initiated on August 3, 2020, with the CEO of North Harbour Gymnastics expressing shock over the allegations.

Following these initial allegations, more parents and coaches came forward to express their concerns about the abusive culture with gymnastics in New Zealand. They claimed that previously, their concerns had not been taken seriously by either clubs or GNZ, leading to a lack of trust in GNZ's ability to conduct a thorough investigation. As a result, there was a demand for an independent review of the culture within gymnastics.

Additional allegations emerged, revealing discrimination against athletes who had reported concerns about abusive coaching behaviours regarding a coach who had attended a 2018 training camp. GNZ was accused of preventing Olympic hopeful athletes from competing for months after they had reported their concerns. Concerned parents had sought legal advice, with an independent party concluding that GNZ's investigation had serious procedural and substantive flaws. It was revealed that GNZ did not have an independent complaints program at the time of these reports in 2019, with High Performance Sport New Zealand stating that they held no jurisdiction over GNZ at the time.

Despite the growing number of allegations, GNZ CEO Tony Compier denied any knowledge of negative consequences for gymnasts who spoke out, defending the organisation's investigation policies and procedures. The New Zealand Sports Minister, Grant Robertson, expressed deep concern over the reports of abuse and encouraged affected athletes and parents to come forward. The Ministry of Sport NZ also implemented an anonymous complaints procedure to ensure individuals could report their experiences without fear of repercussions from GNZ.

On August 5, 2020, Gymnastics New Zealand announced the appointment of David Howman, the former head of the World Anti-Doping Agency (WADA), to conduct an independent review of the sport. This review aimed to examine all aspects of gymnastics, including policies, procedures, and remedies for both past and present complaints. The review's report was initially planned for an October 2020 release.

A week after the initial reports had been released, former New Zealand Commonwealth Games gymnast, Georgia Cervin, expressed her worry that the culture of abuse in gymnastics was so deeply ingrained in athlete, many may not even realise they had been abused, making it challenging for them to come forward and report their experiences to the review. The dismissive response from the gymnastics community, who claimed such treatment was part of the sport's toughness and challenges, further highlighted the normalisation of abuse.

Avril Enslow, the CEO of the Christchurch School of Gymnastics, also made concerning remarks in response to the allegations on public social media forums. Enslow suggested that athletes alleging an abusive culture in gymnastics were acting out of vindictiveness, making excessive allegations, which undermined the urgent need to address any problematic aspects of the sport's culture. Enslow's comments drew frustration from many, as they perpetuated and normalised the abusive culture that had been brought to light. GNZ CEO Tony Compier responded to Enslow's comments, deeming them unhelpful and emphasising the importance of encouraging individuals to come forward and share their experiences.

On August 8, 2020, Gymnastics New Zealand announced that they would step away from handling related complaints. From this point onwards, GNZ redirected any complaints made via the GNZ Safe Sport email mechanism to the Sport New Zealand Independent Complaints Mechanism (ICM). It was emphasised that the ICM operated independently, and the management of complaints would be handled by Dyhrberg Drayton Employment Law. However, it was revealed that GNZ CEO Tony Compier and another senior GNZ employee would still have access to the complaints sent via email. The Sport New Zealand ICM would assess and respond to each specific complaint, tailoring their response to the circumstances of each case. David Howman, who was leading the independent review of gymnastics in New Zealand, would also have access to information from the ICM with the consent of the complainants to address the emerging trends and themes in the review.

In late August 2020, the International Socio-Cultural research group of Women's Artistic Gymnastics (ISCWAG) published an open manifesto, which outlined eight actions the group believed should be taken to protect gymnasts from abuse. Dr. Roslyn Kerr, a participating New Zealand academic, expressed surprise that the widespread culture of abuse in gymnastics had not been exposed earlier, given the history of research and publications on the topic. Former New Zealand Commonwealth Games gymnast Georgia Cervin also participated in and signed the manifesto. GNZ stated that the recommendations from ISCWAG would likely be considered alongside the outcomes of the ongoing independent review for future practices.

By the end of August 2020, the independent review that was underway had already shed light on a number of key themes. One significant issue was the dress code surrounding leotards in gymnastics. Gymnasts had raised concerns that the current dress code served as a tool for control, intimidation, violence, and period shaming. Male coaches were alleged to make inappropriate comments about athletes' bodies, engage in abusive practices such as snapping bra straps, and deny requests to wear shorts during menstruation, and it was raised that competition judges would mark down routines if underwear was visible.

Another important theme emerging from the review was the culture of fear that prevented gymnasts from coming forward with allegations of abuse. They feared repercussions such as non-selection, isolation from peers, ostracism, and unfair judgment at competitions. Parents also expressed fear in speaking up for their children due to potential negative consequences such as inadequate coaching, unfair treatment, and biased judging. This culture of silence and fear was instilled from a young age, with gymnasts being taught to listen but not speak, act quietly, docile, and compliant. Negative reactions on social media further reinforced the fear of reporting abuse.

As the year progressed, claims began to emerge that coaches themselves were also subjected to systemic abuse. Coaches alleged verbal and psychological abuse used to silence those who had witnessed mistreatment of athletes from reporting. One coach even stated that they had observed abuse in every gym they had been in, indicating the widespread nature of the problem within the sport. Allegations of poor working conditions, such as long hours without breaks and no days off, highlighted the lack of protection for contractor or volunteer coaches under employment legislation. There were also concerns about time limits for seeking action against bullying or harassment for employees who were covered under workplace legislation.

In mid-September 2020, Gymnastics New Zealand faced criticism from former gymnasts who believed that the independent panel appointed to conduct the review was ill-equipped for the task at hand. Athlete advocates called for additional input from the Human Rights Commission and international youth sports lawyers to ensure subsequent or complementary reviews with more robustness, expertise, and comprehensive terms of reference to address the wide-ranging issues of child abuse and social concerns within the sport.

Towards the end of September 2020, judges involved in gymnastics competitions also began speaking out about their experiences of mistreatment and abuse in the sport. These judges revealed allegations of bullying and intimidation by senior and head judges, who would manipulate scores to either inflate or deflate final scores for specific athletes in order to achieve desired results. Biases among judges towards athletes from the clubs they were associated with were observed, particularly in national competitions, further highlighting the problematic behaviours within the judging system.

As 2020 came to a close, athletes continued to come forward with allegations of abusive practices. These included instances of overtraining in disregard for international and government guidelines, with athletes often being pushed to train despite injuries and against doctors' recommendations. Such practices were prevalent at both the club and elite levels, impacting athletes as young as nine years old.

As a result of the ongoing allegations from parties coming forward, the original October 2020 deadline of the independent review's report was not met, with the review ongoing into 2021.

In late January 2021, Gymnastics NZ CEO Tony Compier sent an updated Safeguarding and Child Protection Policy to clubs and members, along with a memo outlining the expectation that clubs must have an up-to-date protection policy in place, with all coaches and those holding "other key club roles" undergoing a basic level of child protection training, with a 12-month period being given for clubs to meet this requirement. Clubs were also informed that they were expected to have at least one child safeguarding representative to whom concerns could be raised, with police vetting of all new and existing coaches being carried out every three years. Concerns were raised in response to this by child protection education charity, Safeguarding Children, with CEO Willow Duffy stating that the time frame was too long and did not reflect the commitment to safeguarding children.

On February 10, 2021, Gymnastics New Zealand made public the final report detailing the findings from the past year's independent review, marking a significant milestone in the ongoing efforts to address the deeply rooted issues of abuse within the sport's culture. The report detailed findings of a culture of fear, retribution and abuse permeating the Gymnastics New Zealand community.

Lead reviewer, David Howman, supported by Dr Lesley Nicol and Rachel Vickery, produced a comprehensive 60 page document that outlined the issues plaguing New Zealand gymnastics. The review received over 200 submissions, conducting more than 100 interviews with gymnasts, coaches, officials and parents, while also receiving input from international groups such as Judge Rosemarie Aquilina, the Australian Human Rights Commission, the Athletes Federation, Gymnastics Ethics Foundation, and the Children's Commissioner to prioritise child safeguarding.

Despite the large dedicated response received from the review panel, some individuals expressed dissatisfaction with the investigation, citing a lack of adequate representation for athletes' voices, the review panel received a dedicated response - it is worth noting that only 70 athletes out of 36,000 registered participants contributed to the investigation, with the majority of submissions coming from coaches, judges, and parents.

The primary aim of the report was to assist the sport in addressing past harm, initiating positive changes, and ensuring a safe and enjoyable environment for all participants. Ten main themes were identified in the review, including the negative impact on athletes' health and well-being, the lack of voice for gymnasts, fear of retribution, unrealistic expectations, power imbalances, lack of trust, and insufficient education.

The report highlighted a number of issues within Gymnastics New Zealand, including abusive coaching, body image concerns, eating disorders, limited access to medical treatment, bias in the judging process, fears of speaking up, and a loss of trust. Athletes reported being compelled to train while injured, fearing repercussions if they refused. Parents also expressed powerlessness in intervening due to concerns about retribution.

To address these issues, the review panel made a total of 50 recommendations in total. These included the formation of an athlete commission or union to provide a confidential platform for gymnasts to express their concerns, as well as the identification of coaches perpetuating abuse and the recognition of power imbalances between coaches and child gymnasts. The report also emphasised the need for addressing body image concerns, eating disorders, medical treatment accessibility, and discomfort with training and competing in leotards. Other key recommendations included the establishment of a comprehensive complaint and reporting process, the creation of a medical and health advisory panel, the availability of qualified investigators, the inclusion of parents in observing training sessions, and a review of competition and training attire. Furthermore, the report called for a restorative process for abuse survivors, an independent complaints process, transparent judges' scoring, and the creation of a national register of coaches.It was noted that financial constraints may pose challenges to implement some of the recommendations, however that other similar limitations existed in other sports as well.

An emphasis was placed on the need for a rest and the creation of unity within the gymnastics community, and that while the New Zealand cultural issues were considered less severe than some other international cases, the recommended actions aligned with global efforts to address abuse within the sport.

It was also outlined that the successful implementation of the recommendations hinged on the establishment of a respected committee that included and centred the voices of both ex-athletes and current athletes in order to drive cultural change.

Following the release of the independent review, Gymnastics New Zealand issued a formal apology to those who have experienced abuse within the gymnastics community. The organisation expressed gratitude to those who shared their stories and experiences during the review process. Furthermore, GNZ committed to implementing the recommendations from the report and announced plans to establish a seven-member steering committee, comprising survivors, athletes, human rights representatives, and members of the gymnastics community. This steering committee would oversee the implementation of the recommendations, ensuring accountability and progress.

Collaboration was also pledged by GNZ with various stakeholders including Sport New Zealand, the Athletes Federation, and the Human Rights Commission, to address and redress the harm caused. GNZ acknowledged that no one in the sport should endure any form of abuse and emphasised its commitment to creating a safe and inclusive environment for all participants.

Criticism was raised around the decision to not outline specific incidents of abuse in the sport within the report, with the panel defending its decision by stating it did not provide explicit details as its focus was on identifying overarching themes and systemic issues with GNZ to intitate a comprehensive and transformative change.

The review and GNZ's subsequent actions in the immediate release period received public support from Sport NZ CEO Raelene Castle, who applauded the bravery of survivors for coming forward. Castle believed that GNZ's implementation of the report's recommendations, along with the involvement of the steering committee, would lead to a positive cultural shift in gymnastics. Sport NZ also publicly committed to supporting GNZ during the implementation phase as a member of the steering committee.

Gymnastics New Zealand announced their intent to share the report with the global governing body, Fédération Internationale de Gymnastique (FIG), and collaborate with other gymnastics organisations worldwide who were undergoing similar reviews. GNZ stated that through actively participating in global efforts to address abuse in gymnastics, they aimed to contribute to the overall improvement of the sport's culture and safeguarding measures.

In the days afterwards, further concerns began to be raised about the financial challenges that would be faced implementing the recommendations in the report, especially within the context of the cost of the investigation. The total cost of the investigation, including the report, incurred a cost of approximately $250,000 which was funded by Sport New Zealand. While this funding covered the review itself and the establishment of Sport NZ's Independent Complaints Mechanism that was used for the gymnastics community, the cost of implementing the 50+ recommendations within the report was placed upon GNZ presenting financial hurdles moving forward. The organisation publicly acknowledge their limited financial resources, as GNZ only received annual funding of around $3 million, primarily from participation and touring fees. GNZ reassured that affiliated clubs would not be burdened with increased fees to fund the recommendations being implemented, announcing plans to seek further financial assistance from partners and sponsors.

Additionally, calls for empowering athletes and addressing the gender disparities emerged as plans for the reform process began to take way. Former New Zealand Commonwealth Games gymnast and ISCWAG member, Dr. Georgia Cervin, noted that the review report did not adequately address the gendered nature of the problems within gymnastics, with the expectations of feminity perpetuating gender discrimination in the sport and identifying that addressing these concerns was a human rights obligation for New Zealand.

The first major guideline of the establishment of the steering committee by the end of March were missed, with GNZ stating that COVID-19 alert level changes had affected progress and caused the delay. However ISCWAG academic and survivor, Dr. Georgia Cervin, who was one of several advocates part of a group of more than 100 current and former gymnasts, coaches and judges who had been reaching out to GNZ spoke out noting that there had not been any consultation with the group showing a disconnect in GNZ's statements regarding collaboration and criticising the lack of priority given to the steering committee plans by GNZ.

In the months afterwards, some coaches within the gymnastics community expressed feeling "battered and bruised", acknowledging that many gymnastics clubs were struggling without adequate support with limited resources and multiple roles being handled by staff and volunteers posing significant challenges in implemented the changes within the given timeline.

A year on from the original Stuff investigation report, on August 1, 2021, GNZ had only fulfilled one recommendation from the review - a formal apology to survivors. Former Commonwealth Games gymnasts, Olivia Jobsis and Dr. Georgia Cervin, spoke out about feeling sidelined, with progress being insufficient and GNZ and Sport NZ employing a strategy of exhaustion and victim-blaming. Both parents and independent reviewers expressed disappointment in the lack of response and change, with Safeguarding Children's CEO, Willow Duffy, expressing concern about the ongoing risk to child gymnasts.

The steering committee, originally promised to be formed by the end of March 2021, was still under formation in September 2021, with documents being released that showed that committee was not independent due to GNZ's influence on who was appointed and their ability to remove committee members without notice, and that any recommendations were not binding to be implemented. This was criticised as creating an insufficient illusion of care, that would not see real change, and highlighted how governing bodies failed to address issues and hold perpetrators accountable while refusing to address previous recommendations. Criticism also noted that GNZ investigations seemed to be focused on acknowledging fault, but refusing to take direct responsibility with concrete action to prevent harm from recurring.

In response to this criticism, the structure of the committee was changed in late October, removing the Gymnastics NZ board representation and shifting the focus to being survivor centred, with five gymnasts with lived experience of harm and a mix of experience across codes, clubs, genders and roles within the gymnastics community being included alongside human rights and child protection experts. Despite this, the group was still answerable to the GNZ board on possible changes and the proposals were not binding, with recommendations not having to be adopted by Gymnastics NZ or its board.

With the lack of progress being made by 2022 and frustration with the lack of progress and consideration for survivor voices growing, Gymnastics NZ was forced to admit in February 2022 that they had underestimated the time it would require to change culture. However, they emphasised a long-term commitment to cultural and behavioural change in the sport, committing to implementing all recommendations received by the steering committee in the coming months, with transparency around resource constraints.

In July 2022, GNZ formally approved the steering committee's work plan, titled "Shaping the Future of Gymnastics in Aotearoa", which covered four themes: Integrity, Health and Wellbeing, Environment and Culture, and People and Programs. The Integrity theme included engaging independent experts, improving the complaints process, empowering athletes, and prioritising child and youth-centred focus. The Health and Wellbeing theme had a focus on research, medical and health panels, and a long-term athlete development framework. The Environment and Culture theme aimed to define GNZ's role in leading culture and supporting best practices in clubs. Finally, the People and Programs theme involved initiatives in coach development, judging, technical committees, and education and development programs. In total, 19 actions, projects and work streams were identified to occur over three phases, with priority actions being addressed from July 2022 into mid 2023 before long-term actions requiring complex responses beginning in mid-2023 into 2024.

Two years on from the release of the independent review report, in February 2023, survivors of historic harm were still waiting resolution, despite the ongoing assurances of positive change from those in leadership positions at GNZ. To help direct change, GNZ appointed Andrea Nelson, the former head of the 2022 Cricket World Cup, as their new CEO, and confirmed the development of a progress document to align with the road map released in July 2022. However, former gymnasts expressed regret for raising concern due to the animonsity, disbelief and accusations they had faced from the gymnastics community, including leadership and appointed officials, with parents expressing frustration for being stuck in a state of limbo regarding their complaints that were being bounced between different complaint mechanisms without resolution.

== Portugal ==
In 2014, a peer-reviewed journal article highlighted the abuse of international female artistic gymnasts from Portugal. This research highlighted the common practices of weight control, verbal and emotional abuse, training on injuries, corporal punishment, physical abuse, and a code of silence leading to a lack of parental knowledge about the abuse in training sessions.

== Romania ==
In 1995, Adriana Giurca was found beaten to death in a locker room. Her trainer, Florin Gheorghe, was convicted on charges relating to her death, as he physically abused her in the interest of training her to perfection. The investigation revealed significant pressure on young gymnasts in Romania and the cultures surrounding their rigorous training and what it would mean to make them successful. Adriana's parents were devastated Gheorghe was never convicted on charges of murder.

== United Kingdom ==
After the release of the Netflix documentary, Athlete A, which exposed the scale of abuse in USA Gymnastics, gymnasts in the United Kingdom were prompted to speak out about their own abusive experiences within the sport in July 2020, detailing how complaints about welfare issues were not taken seriously by their governing body.

These gymnasts, including Nicole Pavier, detailed a culture of fear and abuse being ingrained within their training, causing issues such as eating disorders from fat shaming, training on injuries, physical abuse, and denial of their phones to seek help. These accounts prompted further athletes to speak out, including British gymnasts such as Becky and Ellie Downie, with it being exposed that UK Sport knew of abuse allegations as early as 2019.

In response to the allegations, then-British Gymnastics CEO Jane Allen expressed her deep dismay and shame, which was followed by the National Society for the Prevention of Cruelty to Children (NSPCC) and the British Athletes Commission joining forces to establish a dedicated helpline to offer support to affected gymnasts.

Gymnasts continued to express further issues, with Olympian Amy Tinkler speaking out against the time taken for British Gymnastics to take proactive action on bullying and abuse complaints she had submitted in December 2019. Nile Wilson, another Olympic medalist gymnast, stated that within the British Gymnastics "culture of abuse", athletes were treated "like pieces of meat" with their complaints being dismissed in a way that promoted a culture where athletes were afraid to speak up against the physical and emotional abuse they endured.

As the magnitude of the problem became more apparent and more allegations were made, British Gymnastics acknowledged that it had fallen short in protecting its members. As a result of this, an independent review into the allegations of mistreatment began in August 2020 under the oversight of Anne Whyte QC to assess the centrality of gymnast wellbeing and welfare in British Gymnastics culture.

During the investigation period, several coaches, including Claire Barbieri, Amanda Reddin, Helen Potter and Rory Weavers faced temporary suspensions pending investigations after being named in public allegations from gymnasts.

In October 2020, as the Whyte review was underway, then British Gymnastics CEO Jane Allen announced her December 2020 retirement, acknowledging her responsibility for the organisation's past failures in protecting athletes. A new CEO would not be named until June 2021, with Sarah Powell announced as the successor to start her new role in October 2021. Powell acknowledged the scale of reform required, stating her commitment to driving change within the gymnastics community.

In February 2021, a group of 17 individuals aged between 15 and 43 years old initiated legal action against British Gymnastics, seeking accountability for the physical and psychological abuse they endured. These allegations involved inappropriate physical form, failure to address injury, inadequate supervision, abusive coaching techniques, harmful weight management practices, bullying and lasting psychological effects. They sought improved safeguarding, transparency, and a departure from winning at all costs mentality, as well as financial compensation to seek therapy and physical aid. By March 2021, an additional 20 gymnasts had joined the group claim, further emphasizing the magnitude and systemic nature of the problem.

By March 2021, the Whyte Review had received almost 400 submissions. More than 40% of the submissions described physical abuse, while 30 submissions described sexual abuse, forcing UK Sport to admit that athlete welfare was not prioritised until 2017.

In August 2021, Mike Darcey, British Gymnastics Chairman, issued a public apology to the gymnastics community, emphasising the importance of the organisation implementing changes before the Whyte Review's completion, such as expanding the safeguarding team and providing new pathways for feedback.

In June 2022, Eloise Jotischky, an ex-acrobatics gymnast, was the first to win a civil case against British Gymnastics for the abuse she had experienced, with British Gymnastics admitting full liability for the abuse endured with a financial settlement and full apology issued.

The Whyte Review was published in mid-June 2022, finding systemic physical and emotional abuse within gymnastics with over 50% of reporting alleging emotional abuse and 40% describing physically abusive behaviour. While athlete welfare group Gymnasts for Change welcomed the view, they released a statement saying that the recommendations fell far short of what was going to be needed to change the abusive culture.

October 2022 marked the announcement by British Gymnastics that they would name banned coaches in a zero tolerance to abuse strategy for the future, with former Olympians criticising the slow progress of the group as they had only banned a small percentage of coaches named in the Whyte Review. Despite this criticism, not a single coach linked to the review received a ban after this point as of March 2023.

A documentary film entitled Gymnastics: A Culture of Abuse? exploring abuse within British Gymnastics aired on ITV 1 in February 2024.

== United States ==
In the United States, more than 368 people, primarily minors at the time of the abuse, alleged that they were sexually assaulted by gym owners, coaches and gymnastics program staff across the country across two decades starting in the 1990s. The most high-profile of these allegations involved long term USA Gymnastics (USAG) team doctor, Larry Nassar, who was named by more than 265 athletes stating he engaged in sexual abuse for at least 14 years under the pretense of providing medical treatment, resulting in what is considered the largest sexual abuse scandal in sports history.

== See also ==
- USA Gymnastics sex abuse scandal
