= Anti-jock movement =

Cyber-movement

The anti-jock movement is a loosely organized cyber-movement consisting of similarly themed websites, whose goal is to challenge the perceived cultural dominance of institutionalized competitive sports and to raise issues of the perceived detrimental effects of such dominance. According to articles in academic journals, the decade following the year 2000 saw increasing recognition of an online movement consisting of "a group of self-described marginalized youth [who] constructed and sustained anti-jock websites, where they articulated 'dissatisfaction with and anger toward institutions that uncritically adulate hyper-masculine/high contact sport culture and the athletes who are part of this culture (i.e., the ‘jocks’)'”. As a whole, the group of young people who created the anti-jock cyber movement were not students who participated in athletics but rather, the anti-jock cyber-movement was created as support to those who feel as though they have been tormented by the 'jocks,' to which the constituent websites were presented as protest.

Retrospective articles noted that the websites "focused more generally on ways for disaffected high school students to express themselves and solve their bullying-related issues." In their content, the term "jock" was used in its derogatory sense of "stereotypical athlete." Such has been cited as an act of resistance against the dominant media and cultural paradigm.

== Recognition ==
One of the most cited articles giving recognition to the existence of an anti-jock cyber movement is a 2002 article published by Brian Wilson (an assistant professor of Cultural Studies and Sociology, University of British Columbia) in the Sociology of Sport Journal, titled "The 'Anti-Jock' Movement: Reconsidering Youth Resistance, Masculinity and Sport Culture in the Age of the Internet". In the course of the article, Wilson described the movement as follows:

The anti-jock movement is group of self-described "marginalized youth" who, through the production and consumption of anti-jock Websites, express dissatisfaction with and anger toward institutions that uncritically adulate hyper-masculine/high-contact sport culture and the athletes who are part of this culture (i.e. the "jocks"). Through these Websites, strategies of resistance against the "pro-jock" establishment are offered.

In his article, Wilson described the content of the anti-jock sites as ranging from more formal "webzines" to personal sites which often included rants or personal expressions of anger toward "jock culture." Wilson cited specifically to two now defunct websites which he identified as in the "webzine" category, Spoil Sports , and High School Underground . After analyzing the content of these and other "Anti-Jock" websites, Wilson concluded that

In one sense, the anti-jock Websites can be viewed, together, as a new social movement according to Harvey and Houle's definition. That is to say, they are not linked to specific economic interests, they are working toward change in society's (pro-jock) values, and (arguably), anti-jocks are working toward a better society where males and females are nor subject to the domination of the interests of a masculinist sport culture and jocks.

Since its 2002 publication, Wilson's article has often been cited with reference to the existence of the Anti-Jock Movement. Websites which were constituent of the anti-jock cyber movement remain in existence.

== See also ==
- Sociology of sport
