= Jean-Marie Brohm =

French sociologist, anthropologist and philosopher

- Born: 14 December 1940 (age 85); Mulhouse, France

Academic work
- Discipline: sociology anthropology philosophy
- Institutions: University of Montpellier III
- Main interests: critical theory of sport
- Notable works: Quel Corps ?

Jean-Marie Brohm (born 14 December 1940 in Mulhouse) is a French sociologist, anthropologist and philosopher. Professor of sociology at the University of Montpellier III, he was also the founder of the journal Quel Corps ?, member of the editorial staff of the monthly Répertoire and is actually director of the journal Prétentaine. Brohm has written many books and is the leading proponent of the radical critique of sport in France.

== Beginnings of the radical critique of sport ==
Despite two older articles of Brohm the radical critique of sport really began in 1968 with number 43 («Sport, culture et répression» [Sport, culture and repression]) of the leftist magazine partisans.

"the texts which were published in this issue […] had the effect of a bomb on the world of sport and physical education. Sport and physical education, which up to this time were considered only in positive terms, were brutally attacked in their very foundations and their social function. In reply, the resistance in both fields was equally violent."

== Books (selection) ==
English

- Sport: A Prison of Measured Time, Pluto Press, 1987

French

- Sociologie politique du sport, 1976, second edition : Nancy, P.U.N., 1992, 398 p
- Le mythe olympique, Paris: Bourgois, 1981
- Les dessous de l'olympisme, La Découverte, 1984, Collection : Cahiers libres, with Michel Caillat, ISBN 2-7071-1464-2
- Les meutes sportives: Critique de la domination, Paris: L'Harmattan, 1993
- Le corps analyseur: essai de sociologie critique, Paris: Anthropos, 2001, ISBN 2-7178-4224-1
- Le football, une peste émotionnelle : La barbarie des stades, Editions Gallimard, 2006, with Marc Perelman, ISBN 2-07-031951-2
- La tyrannie sportive. Théorie critique d’un opium du peuple, Paris: Beauchesne 2006, ISBN 2-7010-1495-6
- Heidegger, le berger du néant, Homnisphères, 2007, with Roger Dadoun and Fabien Ollier ISBN 2-915129-28-2

== Articles (selection) ==
- «Philosophie du corps? quel corps?» In: Encyclopédie Philosophique Universelle, t. 1, L'Univers Philosophique, Paris: P.U.F, 1989
- «Critique des fondements de l'éducation physique et sportive. Les STAPS, une imposture majeure» In: Les Sciences de l'éducation pour l'ère nouvelle, n⁰ 1/2, Université de Caen, 1991
- «Tranche de vie et analyse institutionnelle impliquée. L'affaire Brohm» In: Traité d'éducation physique et sportive à l'usage de toutes les générations, Montpellier: Éditions Quel Corps, 1994
- «Apparitions des Énigmes. Complémentarisme de l'ethnopsychanalyse et de la phénoménologie» In: Prétentaine, n⁰ 11, janvier 1999

== See also ==
- Michael Messner
