= Journal of Sport & Social Issues =

- Language: English
- Edited by: C. L. Cole

Publication details
- History: 1977 -present
- Publisher: SAGE Publications
- Frequency: Quarterly
- Impact factor: 2.760 (2020)

Standard abbreviations
- ISO 4: J. Sport Soc. Issues

Indexing
- ISSN: 0193-7235
- LCCN: 79643459
- OCLC no.: 731011150

Links
- Journal homepage; Online archive

The Journal of Sport & Social Issues is a peer-reviewed academic journal that publishes papers in the field of sociology. The journal's editor is C. L. Cole (University of Illinois). It has been in publication since 1977 and is currently published by SAGE Publications.

== Scope ==
The Journal of Sport & Social Issues publishes research, discussion and analysis on contemporary sport issues. The journal is of an international, interdisciplinary perspective and aims to examine pressing, topical questions about sport. The Journal of Sport & Social Issues studies the impact of sport on and in areas such as psychology, cultural studies and anthropology.

== Abstracting and indexing ==
The Journal of Sport & Social Issues is abstracted and indexed in, among other databases: SCOPUS, and the Social Sciences Citation Index. According to the Journal Citation Reports, its 2020 impact factor is 2.760, ranking it 46 out of 149 journals in the category 'Sociology'. and 41 out of 58 journals in the category 'Hospitality, Leisure, Sport & Tourism'.
