= Jock (stereotype) =

Stereotype of an athlete

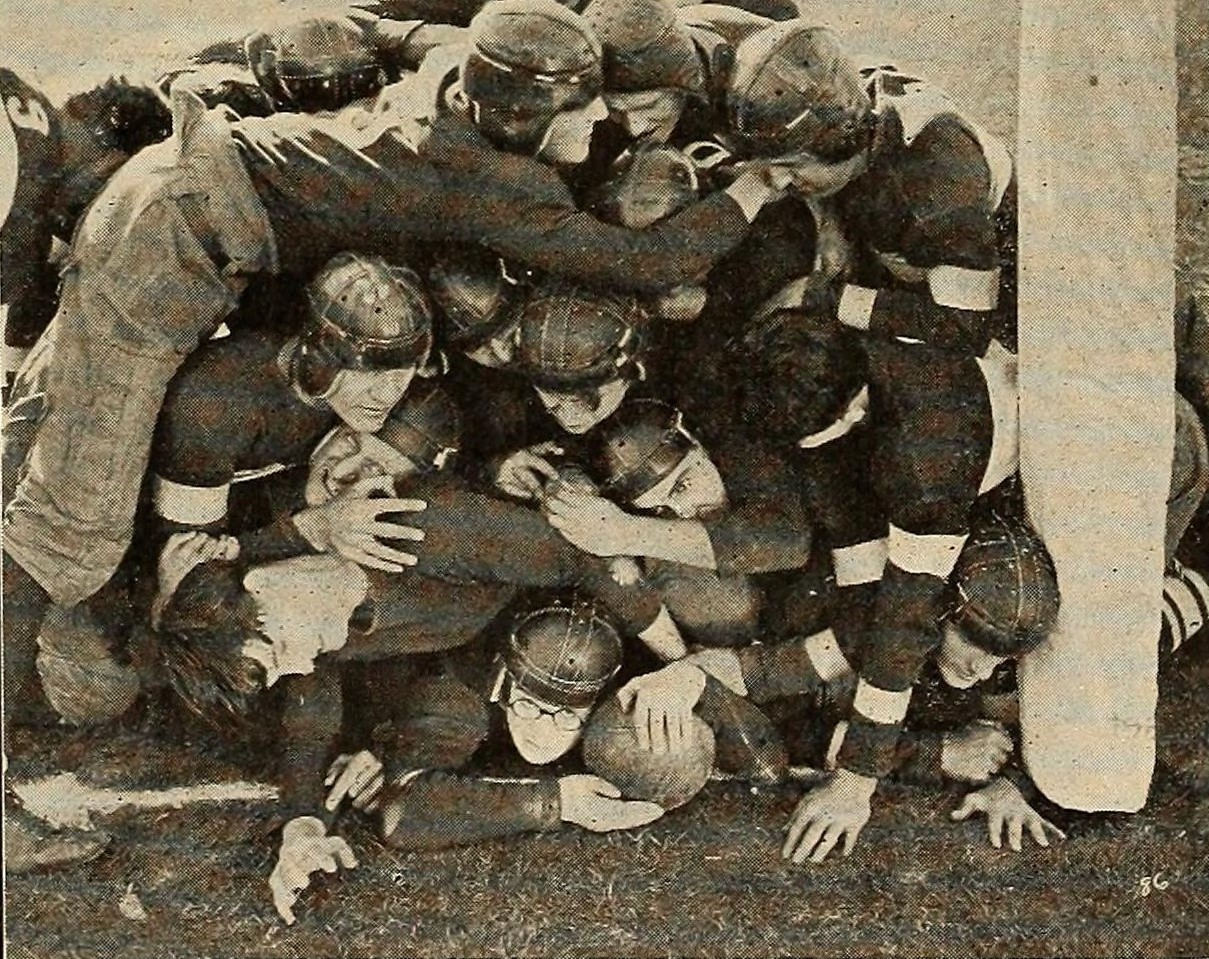
Harold Lloyd at the bottom of a pile on in the 1925 comedy film The Freshman, about a college student trying to become popular by joining the football team

In the United States and Canada, a jock is a stereotype of an athlete, or someone who is consumed by sports and sports culture, and does not take much interest in intellectual pursuits or other activities. It is generally applied mostly to high school and college athletics participants who form a distinct youth subculture.

As a blanket term, jock can be considered synonymous with athlete. Jocks are usually presented as male practitioners of team sports such as American football, basketball, baseball, lacrosse, soccer, swimming, and ice hockey.

== Origin ==
The use of the term "jock" to refer to an athletic man is thought to have emerged around 1963. It is believed to be derived from the word "jockstrap", which is an undergarment worn to support/protect the male genitals while playing sports. In the 1960s, someone who liked sports was sometimes jokingly called an "athletic supporter", which is a euphemism for a jockstrap.

The term "jock" also appears in the 1953 book A House Is Not a Home by Polly Adler, in which Adler used the term "jock" as shorthand for jockey, or a professional rider of racehorses. Adler described jockeys as "handsome, cute, athletic, and well-liked by girls", but with a penchant for parties and alcohol.

Jocks are often contrasted with another stereotype: nerds. This dichotomy is a theme in many American movies, television shows, and books.

== Characteristics ==
Various characteristics of the jock stereotype include:

- Aggressive, arrogant, judgmental, egotistical, easily offended and ill-tempered
- Muscular, tall and athletic
- Handsome
- Very popular with women
- Does not cry or otherwise show weakness or fear
- Afraid to hug or hold a friend too long, performative masculinity
- Often engages in bullying of those who lack athletic ability, or in bullying anyone to gain power
- Frequently given privileges, such as undeserved passing grades or immunity from school discipline, to maintain eligibility for sports
- Easy access to social and sexual environments due to charisma, status and social approval

== Academics and athletics ==
The general perception that athletes are unintelligent is derived from the idea that athletic and academic success are mutually exclusive. Prior to 1990, many researchers were critical with respect to the impact of extracurricular activities and athletics in particular on education. Education and extracurriculars compete for student's time. However, later studies present a strong evidence that athletic or cultural extracurricular activities in school would increase school attendance, self-confidence, grade (in some instance), and college attendance but would reduce performance in standardized test.

Schools often put stipulations in place that require student athletes to maintain minimum academic grade in order to maintain their scholarships. Schools recruit students to their athletic teams, but require a student maintain a certain grade-point average (GPA) in order to have the scholarship renewed. For many young athletes, this is imperative as they could not afford higher education on their own. Therefore, they need to balance enough study to remain eligible with the demands of their sport.

At the college level in the United States, the NCAA does have some education requirements that must be met for high school students to play in a Division I school, and to be eligible for a scholarship. The most recent standards passed by the NCAA, which have applied to all incoming college freshmen since the class of 2016, requires that 16 core high school courses be completed by the student-athlete, 7 of which must be either math, science, or English, and 10 of those 16 classes must be completed prior to their senior year of high school. As well, the students must graduate high school with a minimum 2.3 GPA, up from the 2.0 GPA requirement that was in place prior to these new standards. Such requirements have been debated for years.

== See also ==
- Airhead subculture
- Anti-intellectualism
- Anti-jock movement
- Chad (slang)
- Greaser
- Hearties – the equivalent term at Oxford University
- Himbo
- Nerd
- Preppy and its 1950s precursor the Soc subculture
- Tomboy
