= Sociology of Sport Journal =

- Discipline: Sociology of sport
- Language: English
- Edited by: Cheryl A. Cooky

Publication details
- History: 1984-present
- Publisher: Human Kinetics Publishers
- Frequency: Quarterly
- Impact factor: 2.349 (2021)

Standard abbreviations
- ISO 4: Sociol. Sport J.

Indexing
- ISSN: 0741-1235 (print); 1543-2785 (web)
- LCCN: sf93096904
- OCLC no.: 958675867

Links
- Journal homepage; Online access; Online archive

The Sociology of Sport Journal is a quarterly peer-reviewed academic journal covering the sociology of sport. It was established in 1984 and is published by Human Kinetics Publishers on behalf of the North American Society for the Sociology of Sport, of which it is the official journal. The editor-in-chief is Cheryl A. Cooky (Purdue University). According to the Journal Citation Reports, the journal has a 2021 impact factor of 2.349. Sociology of sport analyses the sport from methodological and a theoretical perspective. There are numerous different sub-sections to be examined when it comes to sociology of sport like: class, race, and gender. With sport being an international topic where different sports are being played in different countries there will always be a combination of races in any sport. The major sports followed around the world with a variety of races involved such as: basketball, soccer, baseball, football are prime examples where white, African American, and Asian people are together on the same team. Very often in sport, economic class plays less of a role due to the fact that many sports are played through elementary and high school, there are varsity teams that students, regardless of class, can participate in.
