= Sociology of sport =

Sub-discipline of sociology

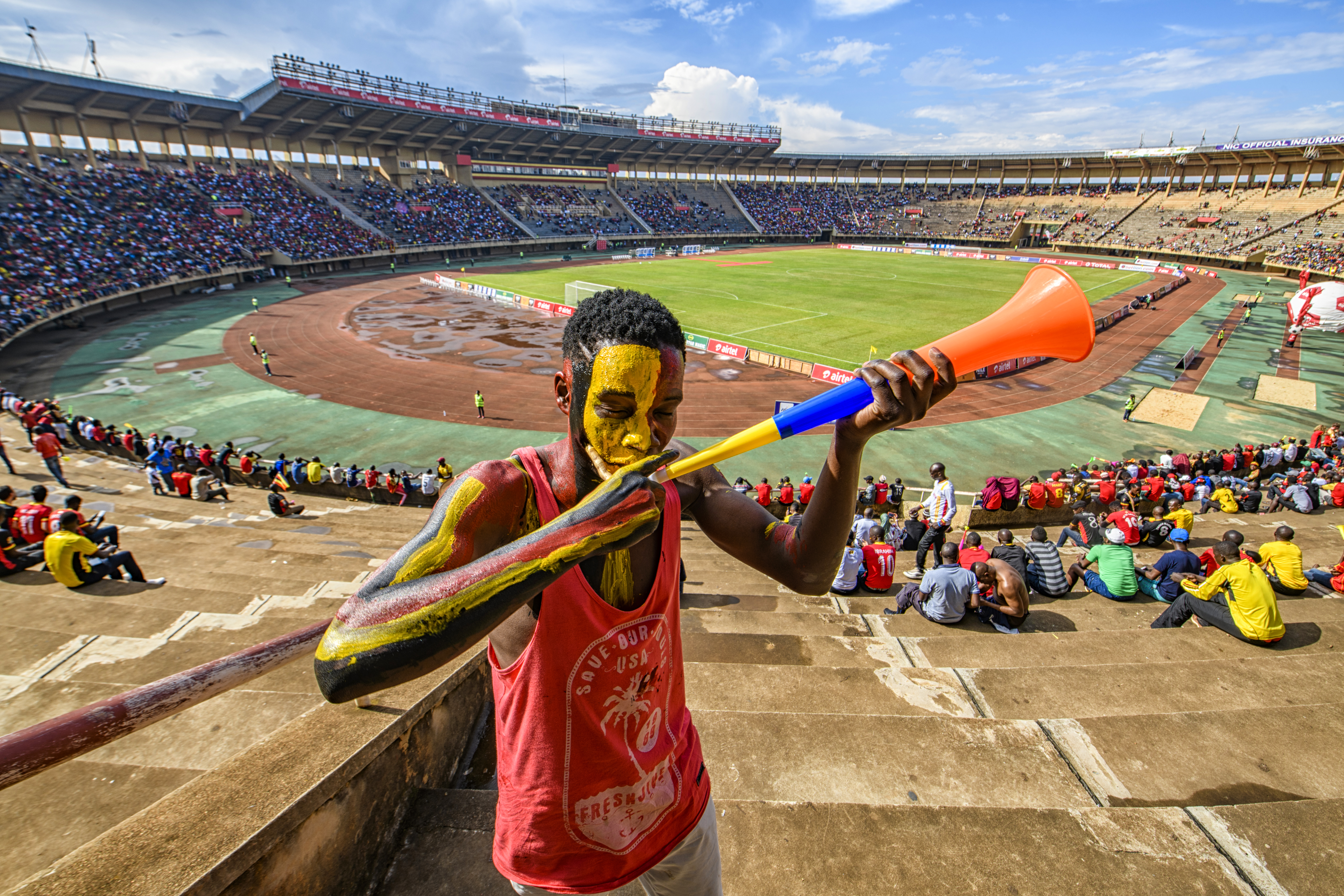
Football fan blowing a trumphet before the Uganda vs Cape Verde game

Sociology of sport, alternately referred to as sports sociology, is a sub-discipline of sociology which focuses on sports as social phenomena. It is concerned with various socio-cultural structures, patterns, and organizations or groups involved with sport. It investigates the impact sports have on players and society as a whole economically, financially, and socially.

Sport is regulated by regulations and rules of behavior, spatial and time constraints, and has governing bodies. It is oriented towards a goal, which makes known both the winner and the loser. It is competitive, and ludic. All sports are culturally situated, intertwined with the value systems and power relations within the host society.

The emergence of the sociology of sport dates from the end of the 19th century, when the first social psychological experiments dealing with group effects of competition and pace-making took place. Besides cultural anthropology and its interest in games in human culture, some of the first efforts to think about sports in a more general way were Johan Huizinga's Homo Ludens or Thorstein Veblen's Theory of the Leisure Class. In 1970, sports sociology gained significant attention as an organized, legitimate field of study. The North American Society for the Sociology of Sport was formed in 1978 with the objective of studying the field. Its research outlet, the Sociology of Sport Journal, was formed in 1984.

Social issues within the field often manifest as threats to social equality, primarily through disparities in participation based on income levels and systemic discrimination against marginalized groups. As sport functions as a formal social institution, it inevitably reproduces the broader socio-structural inequalities of society, leading to fragmented patterns of athletic engagement despite efforts to promote egalitarianism. Scholars suggest that institutional priorities should shift from the idealistic pursuit of total equality toward pragmatic policy interventions aimed at supporting those in the "blind spots" of participation.

Sports can also be viewed as both a game and a parallel ritual process which is connected to leisure time and freedom. The symbolic effect of ritual allows classification of social relationships among people. National sports like baseball in Cuba, cricket in the West Indies, and football in a majority of Latin American countries drive passion that goes past ethnic status, regional origins, or class lines.

== Race and sports ==
=== 1936 Berlin Games ===
There was controversy around the 1936 Berlin Olympic Games, as the rhetoric and laws of the host country (Nazi Germany) encompassed, and indeed were largely based on, overt and extreme racism. Many Germans were dismayed that nonwhite athletes were allowed to compete; the "Nazis were deeply offended by sporting contacts with 'primitive' races and by competing against Negro athletes, in particular."

Adolf Hitler agreed with the proposition people who had ancestors who "came from the jungle" were "primitive because their physiques were stronger than those of civilized whites." and wanted to impose racial segregation on the games, but the Olympic Committee refused. The Nazi regime did, however, use any results they could to propagandize the superiority of what they called the Aryan race.

=== Historical racist theories ===
Sport has always been characterized by racial social relationships. The first scientific look at race came at the end of the 19th century, when count Arthur de Gobineau attempted to prove the physical and intellectual superiority of the white race. Darwin's theory of natural selection was used in service of racism as well. After the athletic ability of black sportspeople was proven, the theory shifted toward physical ability at the expense of intellect.

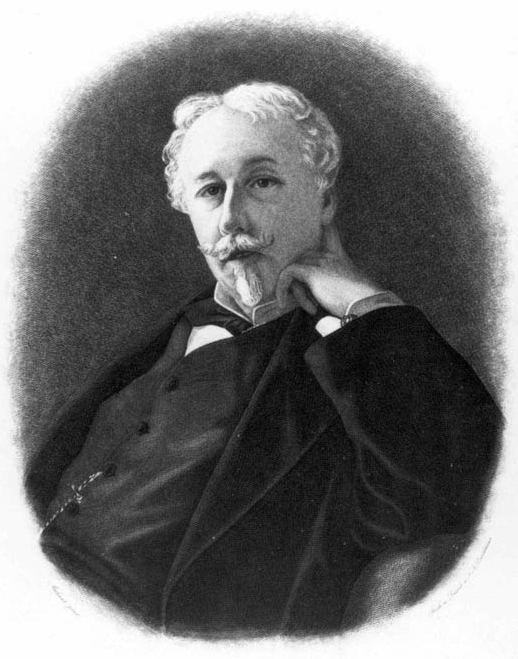
Arthur de Gobineau

Several racist theories were advanced. Black people were athletically able because animals ate all the slow ones. The myth of "middle passage" posited only the most athletically able of black people were able to survive the slave trade and plantation work. The matriarchal theory suggested that absent fathers made black people channel their anger into sports, with coaches becoming father figures. The mandigo theory assumed that the most physically potent black men were bred with the most physically potent black women. The psychological theory claimed that black athletes did not have the intellectual capacity to assume leadership positions in sports. The "dumb jock theory" saw black people enrolling on sport scholarships as they were unable to find success in academia. Lastly, the genetic theory suggested that black sportspeople had more of certain muscle fibers.

=== Current sociology ===
Young African Americans see sports as means of upward social mobility, which is denied to them through conventional employment. Race often interplays with class, gender and ethnicity to determine how accessible certain sports are, and how the athlete is perceived. For example, golf is inaccessible to African Americans less because of race, and more because of the high economic and social capital needed.

Race is often connected to gender, with women having less opportunities to access and succeed in sports. Once a woman does succeed, her race is downplayed and her sexuality is accentuated. In certain cultures, especially Muslim ones, women are denied access to sports all-together.

In team sports, white players are often placed in central positions which demand intelligence, decisiveness, leadership, calmness and reliability. Black players are in turn place in positions that demand athletic ability, physical strength, speed and explosiveness. For example, white players in the role of central midfielders and black players as wingers.

== Gender in sports ==
Female participation in sports is influenced by patriarchal ideologies surrounding the body, as well as ideas of femininity and sexuality. Physical exertion inevitably leads to development of muscle, which is connected to masculinity, which is in contrast to the idea of women as presented by modern consumer culture. Women who enter sports early are more likely to challenge these stereotypes.

Television networks and corporations focus on showcasing female athlete which are considered as attractive, which trivializes the achievements of these sportswomen. Women's sports are less covered by news than male sports. During sporting events, the camera focuses on specifically on attractive women. Allen Guttman argues that erotic component of sports cannot be rooted out, and as such remains one of its key components. Further, attractive male and female athletes will always be more sought after. The erotic component of sports should be researched, instead of being outright rejected.

Jennifer Hargreaves sees three political strategies for women in sports:

- Co-option: this strategy rejects conservative claims of biological differences and traditional gender values. Liberal feminists believe women will gradually take over more roles within sport created and controlled by men.
- Separatism: position held by radical feminists, which advocates self-realization through organization of sport events and governing bodies independent of men. It would further increase the number of women competing in various sports.
- Cooperation: advocated by socialist feminists who believe that cooperation between men and women would help to establish new sporting models that would negate gender differences. They recognize the diversity of struggles within modern capitalist societies, and aims at liberation from them. Unlike separatism it engages with men, and is more extensive than co-option. Co-operation posits that men are not inherently oppressive, but are socialized into reproducing oppressive roles.

== Theories ==
=== Functionalism ===
Structural functionalist theories see society as a complex system whose parts work together to promote solidarity and stability. Sport itself developed from religious ceremonies, which served to promote social and moral solidarity of the community.

Bromberger saw similarities between religious ceremonies and football matches. Matches are held in a particular spatial configuration, pitches are sacred and may not be polluted by pitch invaders, and lead to intense emotional states in fans. As with religious ceremonies, spectators are spatially distributed according to social distribution of power. Football seasons have a fixed calendar. Group roles on match day are ceremonial, with specially robed people performing intense ritual acts. As a church, football has an organizational network, from local to global levels. Matches have a sequential order that guides the actions of participants, from pre-match to post-match actions. Lastly, football rituals create a sense of communitas. Songs and choreography can be seen as an immanent ceremony through which spectators transfer their strength to the team.

Accounting for the fact that not all actions support the existing societal structure, Robert K. Merton saw five ways a person could react to the existing structure, which can be applied to sports as well: conformism, innovation, ritualism, withdrawal, and rebellion.

Erving Goffman drew on Durkheim's conception of positive rituals, emphasizing the sacred status of an individual's "face". Positive (compliments, greetings, etc.) and negative (avoiding confrontation, apologies, etc.) rituals all serve to protect one's face. Sport journalists, for example, utilize both the positive and negative rituals to protect the face of the athlete they wish to maintain good relations with. Birrell furthermore posits sport events are ritual competitions in which athletes show their character through a mix of bravery, good play and integrity. A good showing serves to reinforce the good face of the athlete.

=== Interpretative sociology ===
Interpretative sociology explores the interrelations of social action to status, subjectivity, meaning, motives, identities and social change. It avoids explaining human groups through general laws and generalizations, preferring what Max Weber called verstehen - understanding and explaining individual motivations. It allows for a more complete understanding of diverse social meanings, symbols and roles within sport. Sport allows for creation of various social identities within the framework of a single game or match, which may change during it or throughout the course of multiple matches. Ones role as a sportsperson further affects how they act outside of a game or a match, i.e. acting out the role of a student athlete.

Weber introduced the notion of rationalization. In modern society, relationship are organized to be as efficient as possible, based on technical knowledge, instead of moral and political principles. This creates bureaucracies that are efficient, impersonal and homogeneous. Allen Guttmann identified several key aspects of rationalization, which can likewise be applied to sports:

- Secularization: modern sports have become independent of the religious institutions from which they have evolved. In the pre-modern societies, sport and religious festivities were interconnected. Religion does hold some importance in sports, which can be seen in the pre-match rituals, superstitions and prayer.
- Meritocracy: Sports promote fair competition, while pre-modern sports were exclusive. For example, the ancient Olympics excluded women and non-citizens. In contrast, modern sports offer opportunities to the disadvantaged, while fair judging/refereeing offer a level playing field. Social status still plays a role in sport access and success. Richer countries will have more numerous and successful athletes, while the higher class will have access to better training and preparation.
- Specialization: modern sports, just like industry, has a complex division of labor. Athletes have a very specialized role inside of a team, which they must learn and perform, i.e. the kicker in american football. This does not apply to all sports, as some value the ability to cover a number of roles as necessary.
- Rationalization: modern sports identify the most efficient way to achieve the desired goal. On the other hand, Giulianotti points out that sports are dominated by irrational actions.
- Bureaucratization: sports are controlled by organizations, committees and supervisory boards on local, continental and global levels. Leading positions are supposed to be given based on qualifications and experience, instead of charisma and nepotism. This is not always the case, as powerful and charismatic personage are often put in charge of said organizations and committees.
- Quantification: Statistics measure and compare modern sport events, often throughout multiple generations, reducing complex events to understandable information which can be easily grasped by the mass public. Statistics are not the dominant factor in sport culture, with the socio-psychological and aesthetically pleasing factors still being the most important.

=== Neo-Marxism ===
Karl Marx saw sports as rooted in its economic context, subject to commodification and alienation. Neo-Marxism sees sport as an ideological tool of the bourgeoisie, used to deceive the masses, in order to maintain control. As laborers, athletes give up their labour power, and suffer the same fate as the alienated worker. Aside from supporting industrial capitalism, sport propagates heavy physical exertion and overworking as something positive.

Specialized division of labor force athletes to constantly perform the same movements, instead of playing creatively, experimentally and freely. The athlete if often under the illusion of being free, unaware of losing control over his labor power. Spectators themselves support the alienation of athletes' labor through their support and participation.

Marxist theories have been used to research the commodification of sport, for example, how players themselves become goods or promote them, the hyper-commercialization of sports during the 20th century, how clubs become like traditional firms, and how sport organizations become brands.

This approach has been criticized for their tendency toward raw economism, and supposing that all current social structures function to maintain the existing capitalist order. Supporting sport teams does not necessarily contradict the development of class consciousness and participating in the class struggle. Sport events have a number of examples of political protest. Neo Marxist analysis of sports often underestimate the aesthetic side of sport as well.

=== Cultural studies ===
Hegemony research describes the relations of power, as well as methods and techniques used by dominant groups to achieve ideological consent, without resorting to physical coercion. This ideological consent aims to make the exploratory social order seem natural, guaranteeing that the subordinate groups live out their subordination. A hegemony is always open to contestation, and thus counter-hegemonic movements may emerge.

The dominant groups may use sports to steer the use of the subordinate classes in the desired direction, or towards consumerism. However, the history of sport shows that colonized are not necessarily manipulated through sport, while sport professionalization, and their own popular culture, helped the working class avoid mass subordination to bourgeois values.

Resistance is a key concept in cultural studies, which describes how subordinate groups engage in particular cultural practices to resist their domination. Resistance can be overt and deliberate or latent and unconscious, but always counters the norms and conventions of the dominant groups. John Fiske differentiated between confrontational semiotics and avoidance.

== Body and sports ==
Body became a subject of research in the 80s, with the work of Michel Foucault. For him, power is exercise in two different ways - through biopower and disciplinary power. Biopower centers on the political control of key biological aspects of the human body and whole populations, such as birth, reproduction, death, etc. Disciplinary power is exercised by means of the everyday disciplining of bodies, particularly through controlling time and space.

Eichberg sees three different types of bodies as highlighting the difference between disciplined and undisciplined bodies in sport: the dialogic body, of different shapes and sizes, which are given to freeing oneself from control, and were the main type in pre-modern festivals and carnivals. The streamlined, improved body for sports accomplishment and competition. The healthy, straight body, which is shaped through disciplined regimes of fitness. The grotesque body could be seen in pre-modern festivals and carnivals, i.e. folk wrestling or three-legged race. Modern sport pedagogy fluctuates between strictness and freedom, discipline and control, but the hierarchical relations of power and knowledge between the coach and athlete remain.

Segel claimed that the cultural raise of sports reflected the wider turn of modern society toward physical expression, which revived militarism, war and fascism. Some representatives of the Frankfurt school, saw sport as a cult of the fascistic idea of the body. Tännsjö claimed that overly complimenting sport prowess reflects the fascistic elements in society, as it normalizes the ridicule of the weak and defeated.

=== Sports and injury ===
Prizefighting allows research into the violent body. Prizefighters transform their bodily capital into prizefighting capital, for the purpose of winning fame, status and wealth. Their bodies are exploited by managers, of which they are aware, describing themselves alternatively as prostitutes, slaves and stallions. Prizefighters accept the routine damage their bodies sustain, while at the same time fearing the effects of such damage. A frequent response to this is attempting to turn themselves into heroic personalities. All contact sports have violence as part of strategy to a certain extent. Sports violence is not individual, but is a product of socialization. Finn see footballers as socializing into a culture of quasi-violence, which accentuates different values than those in regular life. It accepts violence as central to the game.

Physical injury of sportspeople can be seen through Beck's theory of a "risk society". A risk society is characterized by reflexive modernity, where members of society are well informed, critical and participate in the shaping of social structures. Unlike the routine risk of traditional society, modern societies identify and minimize risks. Reflexive modernity in sports is evinced in isolation, minimizing and removal of causes of physical injury, while at the same time keeping the techniques and strategies particular to those sports. The lower classes have lower access to risk assessment and avoidance, and as such have a higher rate of participation in riskier sports.

Despite this, athletes are still thought to ignore and attempt to overcome pain, as overcoming pain is seen as brave and heroic. The capacity of the athlete to make the body seem invincible is an integral part of sports professionalism. This ignoring of pain is often a key part of some sport subcultures. Children are also often exposed to acute pain and injuries, i.e. gymnastics.

== Emotion in sports ==
Emotion has always been a huge part of sports as it can affect both athletes and the spectators themselves. Theorists and sociologists who study the impact of emotions in sports try to classify emotions into categories. Controversial, debated, and discussed intensely, these classifications are not definitive or set in stone. Emotion is very important in sports; athletes can use them to convey specific and significant information to their teammates and coaches and they can use emotion to send false signals to confuse their opponents. In addition to athletes using emotion to their advantage, emotion can also have a negative impact on athletes and their performances. For example, "stage fright," or nervousness and apprehension, can impact their performance in their sport, be it in a positive or negative way.

Depending on the level of sports, the level of emotion differs. In professional sports, emotions can be extremely intense because there are many more people in many distinct roles who are involved. There are the professional athletes, the coaching staff, the referees, the television crew, the commentators, and last but not least, the fans and spectators. There is much more public press, pressure, and self-pressure. It is extremely difficult to not get emotionally invested in sports; sports are very good at bringing out the worst qualities in people. There have been violent brawls when one team beats another in an intense game, loud fighting and yelling, and intense verbal arguments as well. Emotion is also highly contagious, especially if there are many emotional people in one space.

== Binary divisions within sports ==
There are many perspectives through which sport can be viewed. Therefore, very often some binary divisions are stressed, and many sports sociologists have shown that those divisions can create constructs within the ideologies of gender and affect the relationships between genders, as well as advocate or challenge social and racial class structures. Some of these binary divisions include: professional vs. amateur, mass vs. top-level, active vs. passive/spectator, men vs. women, sports vs. play (as an antithesis to organized and institutionalized activity).

Not only can binary divisions be seen within sports themselves, but they are also seen in the research of sports. The field of research has mainly been dominated by men because many believe that women's input or research is inauthentic compared to men's research. Some women researchers also feel as though they have to "earn" their place within the sports research field whereas men, for the most part, do not. While women researchers in this field do have to deal with gender-related issues when it comes to their research, it does not prevent them from being able to gather and understand the data they are collecting. Sports sociologists believe that women can have a unique perspective when gathering research on sports since they are able to more closely look at and understand the female fan side of sporting events.

Following feminist or other reflexive and tradition-breaking paradigms, sports are sometimes studied as contested activities, i.e. as activities in the center of various people/groups interests (connection of sports and gender, mass media, or state-politics). These perspectives provide people with different ways to think about sports and figure out the differences between the binary divisions. Sports have always been of tremendous impact to the world as a whole, as well as individual societies and the people within them. There are so many positive aspects to the world of sport, specifically, organized sport. Sports involve community values, attempting to establish and exercise good morals and ethics. Spectator sports provide watchers with an enlivenment through key societal values displayed in the "game". Becoming a fan teaches you a large variety of skills as well that are a very important part of everyday life in the office, at home, and on the go. Some of these skills include teamwork, leadership, creativity, and individuality.

== See also ==
- History of sport
- Women's sport
- Anti-jock Movement
- Physical cultural studies
- Harry Edwards
- Physical culture
- Fitness culture
- Sports strategy
- Sociology of the body
- The Outsourced Self
- Quantified self
- Exercise trends
