= Intergroup relations =

Aspect of organizational theory

Intergroup relations are interactions between individuals in different social groups, and interactions taking place between the groups themselves collectively. It has long been a subject of research in social psychology, political psychology, and organizational behavior.

In 1966, Muzafer Sherif proposed a now-widely recognized definition of intergroup relations:

Whenever individuals belonging to one group interact, collectively or individually, with another group or its members in terms of their group identification, we have an instance of intergroup behavior.

Research on intergroup relations involves the study of many psychological phenomena related to intergroup processes including social identity, prejudice, group dynamics, and conformity among many others. Research in this area has been shaped by many notable figures and continues to provide empirical insights into modern social issues such as social inequality and discrimination.

== History ==
While philosophers and thinkers have written about topics related to intergroup relations dating back to Aristotle's Politics, the psychological study of group attitudes and behavior began in the late 19th century. One of the earliest scientific publications on group processes is The Crowd: A Study of the Popular Mind, written in 1895 by French doctor and scientist Gustave Le Bon. Le Bon proposed that a group of individuals is different from the sum of its parts (often paraphrased as "a group is more than the sum of its parts"). This fundamental idea of crowd psychology states that when individuals form a group, this group behaves differently than each individual would normally act. Le Bon theorized that when individuals formed a group or crowd, there would emerge a new psychological construct which would be shaped by the group's "racial [collective] unconscious." Le Bon put forth three phenomena that explained crowd behavior: submergence (or anonymity), when individuals lose their sense of self and responsibility by joining a crowd, contagion, the tendency for individuals in a crowd to follow the beliefs and behaviors of the crowd, and suggestion, which refers to how the beliefs and behaviors of the crowd are shaped by a shared racial unconscious. Subsequent generations of intergroup relations and social influence researchers built from these foundational ideas and explored them through empirical studies.

The empirical study of intergroup relations, as well as the broader field of social psychology, grew tremendously in the years following World War II. The events of World War II, including the rise of Adolf Hitler and Fascism, the Holocaust, and the widespread use of propaganda, led many social scientists to study intergroup conflict, obedience, conformity, dehumanization, and other related phenomena. Social scientists were interested in understanding the behavior of the German population under Nazi rule, specifically how their attitudes were influenced by propaganda and how so many could obey orders to carry out or support the mass murder of Jews and other minority groups as part of the Holocaust. Several prominent social psychologists were directly affected by the Nazi's actions because of their Jewish faith, including Kurt Lewin, Fritz Heider, and Solomon Asch. Muzafer Sherif was briefly detained by the Turkish government in 1944 for his pro-communist and anti-fascist beliefs. These scientists would draw from these experiences and go on to make major theoretical contributions to intergroup relations research as well as the broader field of psychology.

The cognitive revolution in psychology in the 1950s and 60s led researchers to study how cognitive biases and heuristics influence beliefs and behavior. The resulting focus on cognitive processes and meaning-making represented a significant shift away from the mainstream behaviorist philosophy that shaped much of psychology research in the first half of the 20th century. During and after the cognitive revolution, intergroup relations researchers began to study cognitive biases, heuristics, and stereotypes and their influences on beliefs and behavior. Solomon Asch's studies on conformity in the 1950s were among the first experiments to explore how a cognitive process (the need to conform to the behavior of the group) could override individual preferences to directly influence behavior. Leon Festinger also focused on cognitive processes in developing cognitive dissonance theory, which Elliot Aronson and other researchers would later build upon to describe how individuals feel liking for a group they were initiated into but whose views they may not agree with.

The Civil Rights Movement of the 1950s and 60s led social scientists to study prejudice, discrimination, and collective action in the context of race in America. In 1952, the NAACP put out a call for social science research to further study these issues in light of the Brown v. Board of Education lawsuit. Gordon Allport's 1954 book The Nature of Prejudice provided the first theoretical framework for understanding and counteracting prejudice, and cemented prejudice as a central focus of social psychology. In his book, Allport proposed the contact hypothesis which states that interpersonal contact, under the correct conditions, can be an effective means of reducing prejudice, discrimination, and reliance on stereotypes. Subsequent generations of scientists built on and applied Allport's contact hypothesis to other domains of prejudice including sexism, homophobia, and ableism.

In 1967, Martin Luther King spoke at the annual meeting of the American Psychological Association urging social scientists to advance causes of social justice in their research. In his speech, King called on scientists to study many topics related to the civil rights movement, including the barriers to upward social mobility for African Americans, political engagement and action in the African American community, and the processes of psychological and ideological change among African Americans and Whites.

Intergroup relations research in the final decades of the 20th century refined earlier theories and applied insights from the field in real-world settings. For example, Lee Ross applied his research on correspondence biases and attributional errors in his work on the conflict resolution process in Northern Ireland during The Troubles.

Other researchers have focused on positive elements of intergroup behavior, including helping, cooperation, and altruism between groups. One example of this is a recent field study by Betsy Paluck and colleagues, where they used a radio drama infused with positive social norms to increase reconciliation behaviors and attitudes among an entire village in Rwanda.

Researchers have also applied intergroup theories to workplace settings; one such example is Richard Hackman's work on creating and managing groups or teams in the workplace. Hackman proposed that teams and work groups are successful when specific conditions are met. Specifically, when members of the team and their clients are satisfied, team members are able to grow professionally, and team members find their work meaningful.

The advancement of technology has also shaped the study of intergroup relations, first with the adoption of computer software and later with the utilization of neuro-imaging techniques such as fMRI. One example of psychologists leveraging new technology to advance intergroup relations research is the implicit-association test (IAT), developed by Anthony Greenwald and colleagues in 1998 as a means to measure the strength of implicit (automatic) association of between different mental representations of objects. The IAT is commonly used to measure the strength of implicit bias for a variety of constructs including gender-workplace stereotypes and stereotypes about race.

== Foundational theories ==
Theories about intergroup relations provide insight into how prejudice and conflict arise and how they can be reduced. The Social Identity Theory and Contact Theory are the basic theories to support this concept. According to the Social Identity Theory, an individual would define themselves by their social group partially. To enhance their status, they would have a higher probability of exhibiting in-group favouritism and discrimination against out-groups, which harms the harmony of the intergroup. However, when an identity shared beyond a single group is possible, this can reduce intergroup bias and even enhance cooperation. There might be defensive behaviours, as this theory highlights the role of subgroup identity threats, which supports greater harmony when these threats have been addressed.

=== Contact hypothesis ===
Gordon Allport developed this hypothesis, which states that contact with members of another social group in the appropriate circumstances can lead to a reduction of prejudice between majority and minority group members. There are three psychological processes underlying the contact hypothesis: learning about the outgroup through direct contact, fear and anxiety reduction when interacting with the outgroup, and increased ability to perspective take and empathize with the outgroup which results in reduced negative evaluation. These processes take place optimally when four conditions are met. Groups must:

1. Have relatively equal status
2. Have shared goals
3. Be able to cooperate with each other
4. Recognize an authority or law that supports interactions between the two groups.

Some researchers have critiqued the contact hypothesis, specifically its generalizability and the fact that intergroup contact can result in an increase rather than decrease in prejudice.

The Contact Hypothesis mentions an approach to reduce prejudice and improve relationships in specific conditions is to have meaningful interactions between individuals from different intergroups. The conditions would be having an equal status among different groups and having cooperative goals, which requires the collaboration of the group. These conditions would be effective in diminishing prejudice. Also, having positive contact with institutional support and opportunities for personal interactions to challenge stereotypes would be a special condition for aiming the target. Based on this hypothesis, it reduces intergroup anxiety, increases empathy, and strengthens interpersonal connections. Moreover, the interactions would challenge stereotypes and promote mutual understanding, reducing intergroup tensions, which is essential for fostering intergroup harmony.

=== Realistic conflict theory ===
Realistic Conflict Theory (RCT), also known as Realistic Group Conflict Theory (RGCT), is a model of intergroup conflict that describes how conflict and prejudice between groups stems from conflicting goals and competition for limited resources. Groups may compete for concrete resources such as money and land or abstract resources such as political power and social status which leads to hostility-perpetuating zero-sum beliefs. The RCT was originally proposed by Donald T. Campbell and was later elaborated on in classic experiments by Muzafer Sherif and Carolyn Wood Sherif. The Sherifs' Robbers Cave experiment provided evidence for the RCT by arbitrarily assigning boys at a summer camp with similar backgrounds to different groups. The boys in these groups then competed with each other and elicited hostile outgroup beliefs until a superordinate, cooperative goal was imposed that required the groups to work together resulted in decreased feelings of hostility. Sherif maintained that group behavior cannot result from an analysis of individual behavior and that intergroup conflict, particularly those driven by the competition for scarce resources, creates ethnocentrism.

The Robbers Cave Experiment was conducted in 1954 and was designed to test theories of intergroup conflict. The experiment was designed so that there were two groups of campers, the Eagles and the Rattlers. As the independent variable, experimenters devoided the campers of certain rewards and resources. It was found that when there is a limited amount of resources, there will inevitably be conflict between the groups to fight for those resources. Each group in this experiment also did not see the other group as more or even equally favorable as their own. In the end, this competition eventually led to violence and was broken up only through working together (contact theory). This showed that even if you begin unaffiliated with a group, as soon as you find a group that you associate yourself with (become part of in-group), you will take on the qualities and characteristics of the individuals in that group; whatever that group norm is, you inherent as your own.

Source: University of Oklahoma. Institute of Group Relations, and Muzafer Sherif. Intergroup conflict and cooperation: The Robbers Cave experiment. Vol. 10. Norman, OK: University Book Exchange, 1961.

=== Social identity approach ===
In the 1970s and 80s, Henri Tajfel and John Turner proposed two connected theories of social identity, self-categorization theory and social identity theory, that together form a method for understanding the psychological processes underlying how individuals make sense of their identities and group membership.

Self-categorization theory explains the contexts in which an individual perceives a collection of people as a group and the psychological processes that result from an individual perceiving people in terms of a group.

Social identity theory describes how individual identity is shaped by membership in a social group. It also predicts differences in intergroup behavior based on perceived status differences between social groups, the legitimacy and stability of those perceived status differences, and ability to move between social groups.

The social identity approach has had a wide-ranging impact on social psychology, influencing theory on topics such as social influence, self-stereotyping, and personality.

== Harmony ==
Intergroup harmony refers to having a positive and harmonious relationship within the group. The characteristic of this concept is that the members within the same group respect each other, and prejudice and conflict are reduced. The main component of this concept would be the members within the same group having equal status and cooperation among the group. This is essential for cultivating intergroup harmony because cooperation and equal status create a condition to reduce bias and enhance mutual understanding within the group. There are several approaches to foster harmony among the group. One of the methods is keeping positive intergroup contact, which helps reduce stereotypes and prejudices. Also, using dual-identity frameworks and electronic contact would be effective in improving relationships and alleviating intergroup anxiety. However, there is a possibility that intergroup harmony brings negative impacts to the group. Harmony may sustain inequalities if there are power imbalances that have not yet been addressed and the intervention did not consider social, political, and cultural contexts. This concept is provided by the Social Identity Theory and Contact Theory and is the theoretical basis for understanding and improving intergroup relations.

Intergroup harmony is also a branch of social psychology which is often studied within the framework of Social Identity Theory It is important for many reasons including reduced prejudice, increased psychological well-being, increased economic status, and increased identity security for members of both groups. Two main theories have been put forward for the achievement of intergroup harmony. The contact hypothesis suggests that increased contact leads to higher levels of harmony, and the presence of subordinate goals can help groups in conflict to overcome their differences. Intergroup harmony can be applied in many real world applications including in education, the workplace and family dynamics; however there have also been criticisms for this theory, as not all situations of intergroup harmony will lead to a positive outcome.

=== Background ===
This concept is based on the experiments done by Muzafer Sherif and Henri Tajfel respectively. The experiment done by Muzafer Sherif is the Robbers Cave Experiment. He demonstrated competition for resources and shared goals could shape the forming of group conflict and cooperation. He also suggested that intergroup hostility can be mitigated by introducing superordinate goals to promote cooperation. Henri Tajfel did another experiment in the "minimal group paradigm" experiments. This experiment shows that when there is no competition, intergroup bias arises by separating the members into different categories. Also, according to the Intergroup Threat Theory (2015), attitudes and behaviours towards outgroups would be influenced by the realistic or symbolic threats perceived.

Moreover, Vescio et al. (2004) suggested and verified the Crossed-Categorization Hypothesis. In this hypothesis, a conclusion is that intergroup bias would be reduced by weakening category distinctions when any categories overlap. This hypothesis provides thoughts on cultivating intergroup harmony, although there would still be bias because of the existence of in-group favouritism or prejudice.

There are multiple experts who contribute to this theory. Muzafer Sherif is one of the professionals who is famous for foundational experiments on conflict and cooperation in groups. The Robbers Cave Experiment is one of his well-known experiments that contributes to the concepts of intergroup harmony. Henri Tajfel is another expert. He is the developer of the Social Identity Theory, and he also suggested the minimal group paradigm" experiments. These two theories are essential for the study of intergroup harmony.

=== Definition and importance ===
Intergroup harmony can be defined as the state of peaceful coexistence between the members of different societal, cultural, political, ethnic or identity groups, where there is an understanding from both groups to achieve common, shared goals, and a reduction in feelings of prejudice, discrimination or stereotyping. On the intergroup relations continuum (IRC), harmony falls on the extreme, with conflict as the other extreme, and is viewed as the goal for group situations, due to the minimal prejudice that occurs, and is therefore essential for enhancing and enriching collaboration in diverse societies and its importance has led to many decades of research about the most effective way to reach the optimum level of intergroup harmony.

Intergroup harmony varies cross-culturally. There are currently two well-recognised cultures in the world: collectivist and individualistic. To measure the cross-cultural differences between intergroup harmony, one study measured the levels of interpersonal forgiveness of a person depending on how close they feel to the offender. It was found that in both cultures there is a positive association between closeness to offender and forgiveness; however, in collectivist cultures, this association was weaker, due to the social norms of collectivist cultures in maintaining a level of intergroup harmony in the community, which could not be maintained by the offender. This demonstrates the differences in cultures, where intergroup harmony is more highly emphasised in collectivist cultures.

The main, and arguably, most important reason for promoting, achieving and maintaining intergroup harmony is the reduction of prejudice and discrimination between groups of people. Lower levels of stereotyping and biases lead to lower levels of violence and tension between groups, creating a peaceful coexistence. Another reason for the importance of intergroup harmony is the increase in psychological well-being for members of all groups. When group members experience negative interactions with other groups, this can lead to enhanced feelings of anxiety, stress, worry or even fear, therefore reaching a state of harmony will decrease these negative emotions, leading to higher levels of wellbeing. This can also lead to higher levels of economic success in certain communities, where as intergroup harmony has increased, the need to spend money on legal disputes or civil unrest is decreased, meaning the money can be used in other domains, to improve the economy or create more opportunity for the members of the community. It leads to higher levels of identity security, as people feel a sense of belonging to a wider group, therefore they can maintain their own unique identity, without the worry of being marginalised or isolated within their own group.

=== Influences on society ===
Intergroup harmony brings positive and negative influences. The first positive influence would be reducing prejudice and stereotypes. Various studies illustrate that prejudice declines when attitudes toward out-groups in a harmonious intergroup relationship are improved, even if the members are being threatened or discriminated against. There is a meta-analysis display of the positive impact of reducing prejudice and having intergroup contact. Reducing anxiety about interacting with members from the out-group, and having empathy and perspective-taking are the mechanisms for having this benefit. At the community level, positive intergroup interactions are common, and this would make it simpler to influence social norms and reduce stereotypes even if there is not existing any direct contact between individuals, especially in this diverse society.

Moreover, other positive impacts would be having benefits on the economic and educational levels. For the benefits in the economic category, having intergroup harmony would enhance the productivity of the team. Having intergroup harmony reduces challenges and conflict within the group and has a more equal distribution of resources. This allows the members of the team to focus more on their work rather than being concerned about striving for more resources. This also allows the members of the organisation to see greater networking, effort, and task coordination, which significantly enhances the productivity of the economy. And for the benefits in the educational category, this allows students to have better preparation for the globalised world. An inclusive environment reduces bias, and discrimination would be created by the academic environment. This enhanced the collaborations between students, which fostered the atmosphere within the school more harmonious. This would also be an improvement in academic outcomes and the development of cross-cultural competencies allows the student to be more competitive in the global environment. In conclusion, enhanced economic productivity and better educational outcomes would be seen in societies with higher intergroup harmony as discrimination decreases and more cooperation exists.

=== Empirical evidence ===
There are several pieces of evidence showing the existence of intergroup harmony. One of the examples would be happening in South Africa. In South Africa, after the apartheid era from 1948 to 1994, the Truth and Reconciliation Commission promoted restorative justice and racial understanding to address apartheid-era abuses. The commission focuses on truth-telling and amnesty, supporting social integration and democratic transition. However, critics argue that these policies do not fully address the needs of victims or systemic inequalities.

Another example would be the Good Friday Agreement in Northern Ireland. In 1998, the Good Friday Agreement was signed, and this agreement emphasised power-sharing and cross-community initiatives. This allows the citizens in Northern Ireland to have a similar status to fulfil the requirement of not having extreme differences in status. This has reduced violence and encouraged collaboration between Catholics and Protestants. However, continued segregation in education and neighbourhoods is still a challenge that harms intergroup harmony.

Moreover, in Rwanda, after the 1994 genocide, Gacaca courts were utilised for community-based justice. The courts are used for fostering accountability and reconciliation. Intergroup harmony has also been cultivated through education reforms that integrate peacebuilding and conflict resolution into school curricula.

Toronto and New York are the cities that have intergroup harmony. There are inclusive policies and cultural festivals to celebrate the diversity of the city, fostering intergroup dialogue and reducing prejudice. However, economic inequality and disparities in access to affordable housing are still the challenges hindering comprehensive social integration.

=== Debates about intergroup harmony ===
There are numerous debates towards intergroup harmony. Sustaining inequality is one of the negative arguments about intergroup harmony. Historical narratives would affect the legitimacy of social inequalities. As historical narratives can be changed, there might be an agreement within the harmonious intergroup that ignores historical contexts or changes the historical narratives. This might transfer the problem of intergroup conflict to interpersonal relations. Also if the intergroup threat perceptions forcing group-based inequality are seen as legal and acceptable, this would maintain and persist social inequalities.

However, the problem of inequality can be improved by having positive intergroup contact. Positive intergroup contact significantly enhances collective action among advantaged group members. This can reduce social dominance orientation and improve the inequality problem by taking further actions. The advantaged group members would have a higher probability to engage in collective action supporting disadvantaged groups when the advantaged group members engage in discussions about power imbalances during intergroup contact. This will also be improved when the advantaged group helps the disadvantaged groups to maintain an equal status within the intergroup.

Another negative argument would be reduced collective action motivation. Some arguments state that the motivation of marginalised groups for collective action would reduced when promoting intergroup harmony through common identity frameworks. When disadvantaged group members are encouraged to adopt a shared identity with advantaged groups, they may experience reduced group-based anger and perceive inequalities as less severe, decreasing their willingness to push for social change. Another argument would be promoting intergroup harmony would distract the members from social change goals. The goals of the advantaged groups and the disadvantaged groups might be different. They might change their goals because of intergroup harmony forcing them not to oppose the ideas.

However, the problem of collective action motivation can be improved by having a dual identity framework that enhances action. While common ingroup identity alone may reduce collective action, adopting a dual identity framework—where individuals maintain both their unique group identity and a shared overarching identity—can boost collective action. This approach allows disadvantaged groups to recognize their distinct struggles while fostering positive intergroup relations, enhancing motivation for social change.

=== Achieving intergroup harmony ===
Intergroup harmony is important to obtain in any situation where members of diverse groups are present. The ways in which to maximally achieve harmony have been debated; however three main theories have emerged: the contact hypothesis, the presence of subordinate goals, and more recently the use of music and sports to promote harmony.

==== The contact hypothesis ====
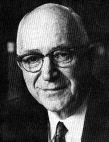
Social psychologist Gordon Allport, who first proposed the Contact Hypothesis for intergroup harmony

The Contact Hypothesis is a theory of social psychology associated with intergroup conflict and harmony, first proposed by Allport in his book, The Nature of Prejudice, which suggests that intergroup harmony can be achieved through structured, meaningful contact between groups. Nineteenth century social psychology was dominated by the view that intergroup contact did not achieve harmony, but instead led to conflict between groups; however, following the end of the Second World War, views began to turn optimistic. Psychologists started to circulate views that intergroup experiences led to a mutual understanding and harmony.

Allport's theory itself drew on previous research about desegregation in the workplace and housing options for black people in the USA. He came to the conclusion that the way to maximally reduce prejudice and achieve a state of intergroup harmony was to increase intergroup contact when four factors were present:

1. Equal status between groups
2. Common goals
3. Intergroup cooperation
4. The support of higher authority

When all four of these conditions were met, intergroup harmony was achieved. However, he warned that without these conditions, the same contact can lead to increased prejudice, and it is important to account for inconsistencies. In 1998, Pettigrew set out a fifth condition that must be met in order for intergroup contact to have a significant effect: friendship potential. It states that the interaction must provide the opportunity for group members to become friendly with one another and this will lead to the highest levels of intergroup harmony.

==== Subordinate goals ====
Another way to achieve intergroup harmony, which was also proposed in the 1950s, was through subordinate (shared) goals between outgroups. This idea was introduced by Muzafer Sherif, during his 'Robber's Cave' experiment'. 22 boys, aged 11, were sent to a summer camp in Oklahoma and separated into 2 groups, each with their own stereotypes and shared group culture. It was hypothesized that the hostile attitudes that developed between the groups could be overcome when the need to cooperate in order to achieve subordinate goals was present. Situations were created throughout the summer camp where the two groups had to come together to reach a shared goal, for example pooling money to rent a movie, and it was found that the win-win situations for both groups had the positive effect of reducing the prejudice and discrimination the groups felt towards each other, and increasing harmony in the camp.

==== Music and sport ====
In the past, music has been a means of appearing threatening or inciting hatred within ingroups; however, it can also be an effective way of promoting intergroup harmony in many different cultures. Lyrics can be a way of publishing and explicitly projecting messages of encouragement, tolerance and harmony, through engaging, enjoyable means that many different people will listen to. Music can be seen as an emotive, effective communication method used across much of the intergroup landscape.

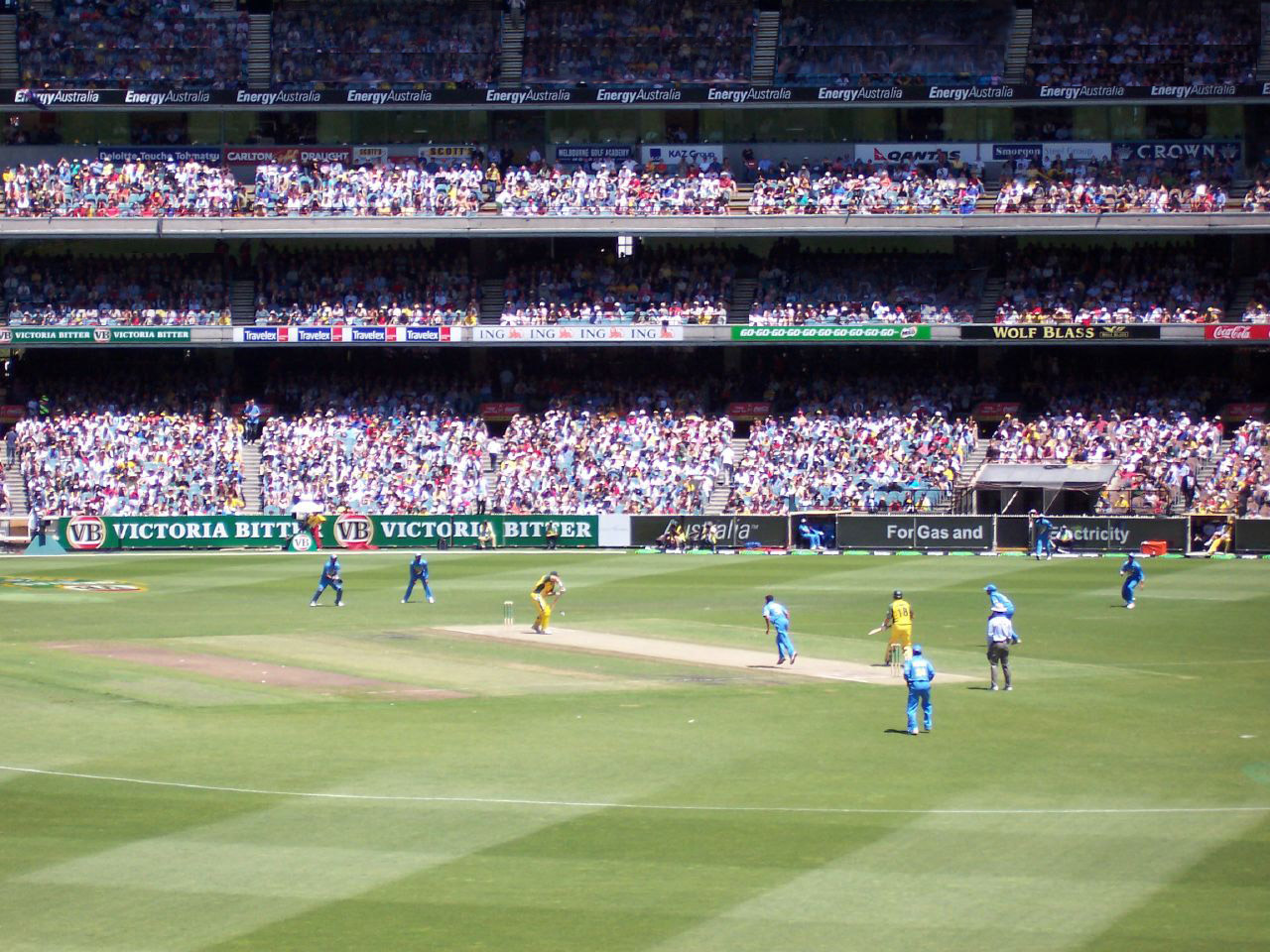
Team sports, such as cricket, have been proposed as a way of promoting intergroup harmony through a shared goal

Sports can provide an opportunity for groups to meet with the distraction from their own social categorisations, and a subordinate goal to play or perform in a sport. It can allow those from closed identity groups to highlight their existing commonalities with other groups, leading to a higher level of intergroup harmony, as they feel a closer sense of belonging to the wider identity group, once their commonalities have been emphasised. However, much of the research done on sporting as a way of promoting intergroup harmony has been rather anecdotal, and further, empirical evidence is needed to strongly support this theory.

=== Applications ===
Exposure to intergroup harmony in education leads to higher levels of intergroup harmony as the students leave schools, and enter the world. One way in which intergroup conflict is found to manifest itself in schools is through the form of racism. Interventions in primary schools, such as the Building Harmony intervention, have provided evidence for the effectiveness of increasing intergroup harmony by reducing racism in younger children, and although evidence was tenuous in the first study, further studies have provided strong evidence for the measure as a way of reducing racism in schools, therefore leading to higher levels of intergroup harmony.

A second way intergroup harmony can be applied to the real world is in the workplace, where intergroup harmony creates motivated employers, who do efficient, high quality work. In workplaces all over the world, intergenerational conflict can cause ineffective work, due to the ageism faced by both older and younger co-workers. To stop these issues, it is important to create a harmonious working environment. Recently, it was found that when intergroup harmony was achieved via a higher level of quality contact time between the two age groups in the office, task and relationship conflict was highly decreased, leading to more efficient and happier colleagues, which in turn leads to the production of higher quality work. Intergroup harmony is also important in the workplace for diversity, as marginalised outgroups can work together with other groups to reduce negative stereotypes in a controlled environment. This even has wider connotations in the world of social change, as intergroup harmony can foster social change in many other aspects of life.

Intergroup harmony can also be important in the blending of stepfamilies to create a safe, loving environment where children can grow up. As stepfamilies have often been described as the 'less cohesive and more stressful' family type, increasing intergroup harmony can increase the cohesion of these families. When the whole family is viewed as one group, children have reported feeling an elevated sense of harmony in the family, leading to higher levels of psychological well-being and greater positive contact from all members.

=== Criticism ===
Intergroup harmony has many implications in the real world, and often involves cooperative, positive interactions; however, when power dynamics are not considered, these encounters can fall through. When power dynamics are ignored, the lower status group seeks to reach a more equal state, whereas the higher status group attempts to maintain the current equality level. This leads to differing views about the current state of equality and can cause negative attitudes towards the groups, as they are no longer attempting to reach a shared goal, but instead attempting to reach different goals, which benefit their ingroup more than the outgroup. This can lead to conflict, even when the initial aim was to reach a harmonious state.

Furthering from causing conflict due to power inequalities, intergroup harmony can also lead people to have false expectations about equality. When contact between two groups was commonality based, outgroup members expected more fairness from ingroup members, as tested by an experiment, when students were separated into two lab groups, and the ingroup were assigned to divide credits to the outgroup members. Before the assignment of credits, members of both groups met and discussed common features. This led to the belief from outgroup members that they would be given a higher number of credits than they were actually given. The intergroup harmony they felt from interacting with the outgroup led them to form false expectations about the equality between the two groups, which can create conflict in the future.

In addition, intergroup harmony does not work for every situation. Interactions that promote harmony can lead to the suppression of differences within groups, causing further negative attitudes towards the other group, and contact with the sole desire of coexistence will not actually improve relations between groups. In 2011, Maoz provided evidence for this theory using the attempts for coexistence between Israeli Jews and Palestinians. Although there is much research on the promotion of intergroup harmony in general, little is said about promoting harmony in groups who are facing protracted asymmetrical disputes, and attempts to promote intergroup harmony can also lead to further problems between these groups, as contact can cause distress and lead to further negative attitudes about the other group.

== Current directions ==
Early research on intergroup relations focused on understanding the processes behind group interactions and dynamics, constructing theories to explain these processes and related psychological phenomena. Presently, intergroup relations is characterized by researchers applying and refining these theories in the context of modern social issues such as addressing social inequality and reducing discrimination based on gender identity, sexual orientation, race/ethnicity, and religion.

=== Prejudice reduction ===
Theories from intergroup relations research have informed many approaches to prejudice reduction. Researchers have focused on developing theoretical frameworks for understanding how to effectively reduce intergroup conflict and prejudice. For example, a recent intervention developed by Patricia Devine and colleagues focuses on training individuals to overcome cognitive biases and reduce implicit bias. The intervention resulted in reduced implicit bias up to two months after the intervention was administered. Other prejudice reduction research has investigated intergroup interaction techniques including cooperative learning (such as Elliot Aronson's "Jigsaw Classroom") and making group identity less salient or a superordinate identity more salient in addition to individual techniques such as encouraging perspective-taking with a member of a stigmatized group and building empathy with stigmatized groups. Another technique that has been studied to reduce prejudice through intergroup relations included sparking interest in another person's culture that was different than their own. A meta-analysis of 515 studies found that there seemed to be a connection between intergroup contact and lower levels of intergroup prejudice.

Meta-analyses of implicit bias reduction studies have shown that many produce limited effects that do not persist outside of a laboratory setting. Some researchers have called for more field research and studies that employ longitudinal designs to test the external validity and durability of existing prejudice reduction techniques, especially workplace diversity programs that may not be informed by empirical research. There was also a study conducted on how pluralistic ignorance can affect intergroup contact. Their research showed evidence that both in-groups and out-groups can overestimate the other group's lack of interest in intergroup contact.

=== Addressing social inequalities ===
Social scientists have examined phenomena related to social inequality such as poverty, disenfranchisement, and discrimination since the early days of social psychology. However, researchers have only recently begun developing theories on the psychological consequences and impacts of social inequality. Current research on social inequality has explored the psychological effects of racially disparate policing practices on minorities, whites' tendency to underestimate the pain of blacks due to false beliefs in biological differences, how increasing belonging among students from stigmatized backgrounds can boost their GPAs and retention rates, and how social class influences prosocial behavior.

A majority of research on social inequality has principally focused on single categories such as race and gender. Increasingly, more researchers are exploring the effects of how the intersection of identities affect individual and group psychological processes. For example, Judith Harackiewicz and her colleagues examined race and social class as related constructs in a utility-value intervention designed to close the racial achievement gap of underrepresented minority students in introductory STEM college courses.

Other areas of current intergroup relations research include:

- Understanding white backlash to racial diversity
- Effectively managing teams and group identities in the workplace
- Understanding the psychological processes behind political and ideological polarization
- Further studying cross-cultural communication

== Notable figures (1900–1979) ==
=== Kurt Lewin ===
Kurt Lewin is considered to be one of the founding fathers of social psychology and made major contributions to psychological research. Lewin founded the Research Center for Group Dynamics at MIT in 1945:

"Lewin was interested in the scientific study of the processes that influence individuals in group situations, and the center initially focused on group productivity; communication; social perception; intergroup relations; group membership; leadership and improving the functioning of groups."

Lewin coined the term group dynamics to describe how individuals and groups behave differently depending on their environmental context. In terms of intergroup relations, he applied his formula of B = ƒ(P, E) - behavior is a function of the person and their environment - to group behavior. The theory behind this formula, which emphasizes that context shapes behavior in conjunction with an individual's motivations and beliefs, is a cornerstone of social psychological research. Lewin conducted numerous studies that pioneered the field of organizational psychology, including the Harwood Research studies which showed that group decision-making, leadership training, and self-management techniques could improve employee productivity.

=== Gordon Allport ===
The American social psychologist Gordon Allport is considered to be one of the pioneers of the psychological study of intergroup relations. Especially influential is Allport's 1954 book The Nature of Prejudice, which proposed the contact hypothesis and has provided a foundation for research on prejudice and discrimination since the mid-1950s. Allport's contributions to the field are still being elaborated upon by psychologists, with one example being the common ingroup identity model developed by John Dovidio and Samuel Gaertner in the 1990s. In honor of Allport's contributions to psychology, the Society for the Psychological Study of Social Issues named their annual intergroup relations prize after him.

Beyond his theoretical contributions to the field, Allport mentored many students who would go on to make important contributions of their own to intergroup relations research. These students include Anthony Greenwald, Stanley Milgram, and Thomas Pettigrew.

=== Muzafer Sherif and Carolyn Wood Sherif ===
Muzafer Sherif and Carolyn Wood Sherif performed multiple notable experiments on the subject in the mid-20th century including the Robbers Cave experiments; these experiments formed the basis for realistic conflict theory. These studies have had a lasting impact on the field, providing a theoretical explanation for the origin of intergroup prejudice while also exploring techniques to reduce negative attitudes between groups. The Sherifs proposed that group behavior cannot result from an analysis of individual behavior and that intergroup conflict, particularly those driven by the competition for scarce resources, creates ethnocentrism. Muzafer Sherif's research on the psychology of group conflict was informed by his experiences observing and studying discrimination and social pressures in the United States and in Turkey.

Carolyn Wood Sherif, along with Muzafer Sherif and Carl Hovland, developed social judgment theory, a model for self-persuasion that explains how individuals perceive and evaluate new ideas by comparing them with current attitudes. The theory sought to outline how individuals make sense of persuasive messages and how this can in turn influence individual and group beliefs.

=== Solomon Asch ===
Solomon Asch's work on conformity in the 1950s also helped shape the study of intergroup relations by exploring how the social pressures of group membership influence individuals to adhere their behavior, attitudes, and beliefs to group norms. The results of these studies showed that individuals could yield to group pressure, with subsequent studies investigating the conditions under which individuals are more or less likely to conform to the behavior of the group. Asch's research, along with Stanley Milgram's shock experiments, shed light on the psychological processes underlying obedience, conformity, and authority.

=== Henri Tajfel and John Turner ===
British psychologists Henri Tajfel and John Turner developed social identity theory and later self-categorization theory, pioneering the social identity approach in psychology in the 1970s and 80s. Tajfel and Turner were among the first psychologists to study the importance of social group membership and explore how the salience of an individual's group membership determined behavior and beliefs in the group context. Tajfel invented the minimal groups paradigm, an experimental method of arbitrarily assigning to individuals to groups (e.g., by flipping a coin) which showed that even when individuals were divided into arbitrary, meaningless groups, they tended to show favoritism for their own group.

== Notable figures (1980–present) ==
=== Lee Ross ===
Lee Ross has conducted research on several psychological phenomena closely related to intergroup relations including the fundamental attribution error, belief perseverance, and most recently naive realism - the idea that individuals believe they see the world objectively and that those who disagree with them must be irrational or biased. In 1984, Ross co-founded the Stanford Center on International Conflict and Negotiation (SCICN), an interdisciplinary research center focused on applying findings from psychology, law, and sociology to help resolve international socio-political conflicts. Ross and his colleagues at SCICN studied many of these concepts as they apply to conflict resolution and worked on negotiation and resolution efforts in Northern Ireland during The Troubles and in the middle east in the wake of the Gulf War.

=== Susan Fiske ===
Susan Fiske, along with her colleagues Amy Cuddy, Peter Glick, and Jun Xu, developed the stereotype content model which states that stereotypes and intergroup impressions are formed along two dimensions: warmth and competence. The stereotype content model builds from evolutionary psychology theory, stating that individuals tend to first assess whether people are a threat (warmth) and then assess how people will act based on the initial assessment (competence). It follows that social groups that compete for real or perceived resources such as money or political power are considered low on warmth while social groups that are high-status (e.g. in terms of finance or education) are rated high on competence. Fiske also co-developed the widely used Ambivalent Sexism Inventory, a measure of hostile sexism and benevolent sexism.

=== Claude Steele ===
Claude Steele and his colleagues Steve Spencer and Joshua Aronson are known for studying stereotype threat - the situational pressure one feels when they are at risk of confirming a negative stereotype about their group. Three factors underlie the mechanism of stereotype threat: stress arousal, performance monitoring, and cognitive efforts to reduce negative thoughts and feelings. There is evidence that stereotype threat plays a role in lower academic and professional performance among individuals in negatively stereotyped groups, although other studies have called this into question. Steele and his collaborators have studied several forms of interventions to mitigate stereotype threat, including self-affirmation methods and providing psychologically "wise" critical feedback.

=== Anthony Greenwald ===
Anthony Greenwald and colleagues Debbie McGhee and Jordan Schwartz designed the implicit-association test or IAT. The IAT is used to test the strength of an individual's implicit (automatic) associations between mental representations and is commonly used in intergroup research to test implicit bias. Recently, the validity of the IAT as a measure of implicit bias has been called into question. Greenwald, who was a student of Gordon Allport, has also investigated in-group favoritism as it relates to discrimination and implicit social bias across a variety of topics including effects on medical school admissions and stereotype formation among young children.

=== Jim Sidanius ===
Jim Sidanius and Felicia Pratto developed social dominance theory, which states that most social groups are organized into hierarchies within developed societies. According to the theory, these hierarchies are based on age, with older individuals having more power, sex, with men having more power than women, and arbitrary-set hierarchies which are culturally defined and can include race/ethnicity, religion, and nationality. The theory also predicts patterns of group conflict based on a high-power hegemonic groups discriminating and oppressing low-power groups, with one mechanism of oppression involving myths that legitimize the hegemonic group's status. Sidanius developed the social dominance orientation scale to measure the desire for one's in-group to dominate and be superior to out-groups.

=== Jennifer Richeson ===
Jennifer Richeson studies racial identity, social inequality, and interracial relations with a focus on understanding the psychological processes behind reactions to diversity. Richeson's research has examined whites' and minorities' reactions to the likely future "majority-minority" demographic in the United States, specifically how whites feel threatened to this increase in diversity and how this threat influences political attitudes and perceptions of immigrants. In work focusing on social inequality, Richeson and her colleagues Michael Kraus and Julian Rucker found that Americans incorrectly estimate the extent to which economic equality has been achieved with both whites and blacks with high and low incomes overestimating race-based economic equality.

In 2006, Richeson was awarded a MacArthur Foundation Fellowship for using mixed methods, including fMRI, to show that interracial contact reduces performance on inhibitory tasks because individuals engage in self-control behaviors to handle fears of appearing prejudiced (whites) or fears of being a target of prejudice (blacks).

=== Jennifer Eberhardt ===
Jennifer Eberhardt conducts research that investigates the psychological associations between race/ethnicity and crime. She has shown that police officers tend to identify black faces as criminals more often than white faces, that criminal defendants with more stereotypically black features were more likely to receive harsher sentences including the death penalty, and that when people think of black juvenile offenders they tend to perceive all juvenile offenders as more adult, resulting in higher levels of punishment.

Eberhardt received a MacArthur Foundation Fellowship in 2014 for her research on the effects of racial bias and their societal consequences. She is a co-founder of Social Psychological Answers to Real-world Questions (SPARQ), a translational research organization that applies psychological findings to address social issues.

== Academic journals ==
- Group Processes & Intergroup Relations
- Journal of Personality and Social Psychology
- Journal of Experimental Social Psychology
- Personality and Social Psychology Review
- Personality and Social Psychology Bulletin
- Group Dynamics: Theory, Research, and Practice
- European Journal of Social Psychology
- British Journal of Social Psychology

== See also ==
- Group conflict
- In-group and out-group
- Intergroup bias
- Intergroup dialogue
- Social identity theory
- Social norms
- Social projection
- Psychology of social class
