= Recategorization =

Phenomenon in social psychology

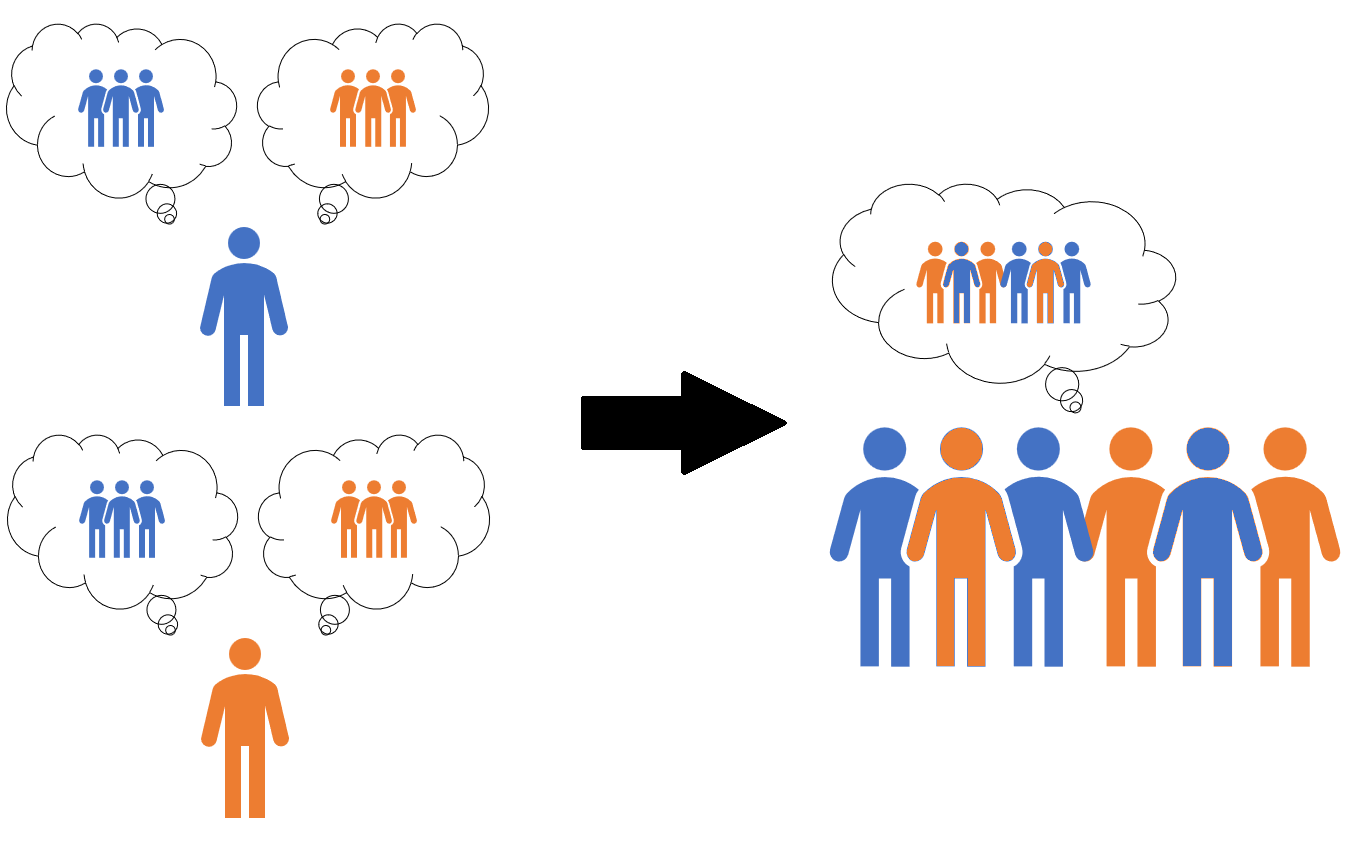
Prior to recategorization, individuals identify with separate and distinct groups. Following recategorization, individuals identify with a united group that encompasses their previous group identities.

In social psychology, recategorization is a change in the conceptual representation of a group or groups. When deliberate, recategorization is often encouraged in order to mitigate bias by making salient a common ingroup identity that encompasses the group identities of the preexisting categorization. This common ingroup identity is more inclusive than the preexisting group identities, changing conceptions of an "us" ingroup and a "them" outgroup into a "we" superordinate group, and can result in ingroup bias towards former outgroups and an increase in prosocial behavior. Common ingroup identities can be built around superordinate goals, perceived shared fate, or preexisting superordinate group identities, and are supported by positive intergroup contact.

Two primary forms of recategorization are recognized: single-identity recategorization, in which groups are recategorized into a single common ingroup identity, and dual-identity recategorization, in which groups maintain their original identities in addition to a common ingroup identity. Both forms of recategorization can be difficult to implement, and in certain circumstances recategorization efforts can exacerbate intergroup conflicts. Still, numerous recategorization interventions have been devised and tested, and recategorization policies have been implemented on a national scale: notably, Rwanda included recategorization policies in its 2003 constitution to replace ethnic identities with a single national identity.

== Mechanism ==
=== Common ingroup identity model ===
Sharing a common identity with another person or group is associated with positive treatment and greater closeness due to ingroup bias, the tendency for individuals to favor members of their ingroup in comparison to outgroups. The common ingroup identity model proposes recategorization as a tool to reduce these biases, by broadening the scope of existing identities or encouraging self-categorization into a more inclusive identity. These inclusive group identities are known as superordinate group identities. Superordinate groups can be defined by 1) common group identity (that may not be salient), such as students of different races sharing an identity based on their school affiliation, 2) by common superordinate goals, such as when different political groups cooperate to pass legislation they both favor, or 3) a perceived shared fate, such as the idea that a town's inhabitants will flourish or fail as a group. Sharing a superordinate group with another is associated with increased prosocial behavior.

When superordinate group identities are made more salient, groups that share them feel more positively towards one another as they interact positively within the framework of a superordinate group or in order to accomplish shared goals or affect a shared fate. Over time, the positive feelings these interactions evoke can become generalized from individuals to groups; these feelings generalize more if the initial group identities remain salient alongside the superordinate group identity. This model is predated and supported by Tajfel and Turner's social identity theory, which describes how people consider ingroups and outgroups differently and seek positive distinctiveness for their ingroup, as well as self-categorization theory, which states that group membership is mutable and people categorize themselves based on the fit and accessibility of different groups. In essence, recategorization can be achieved by increasing the fit and accessibility of the common ingroup identity, and successful recategorization reduces a bias difference between groups by using a superordinate identity to extend ingroup favoritism towards former outgroups.

It is hypothesized that certain factors can facilitate the creation of a common ingroup identity. These factors include similar group characteristics, intergroup cooperation, and low intergroup differentiation, each of which can be fostered through positive intergroup contact.

=== Intergroup contact theory ===
The common ingroup identity model, first outlined in 1993, describes how recategorization can mitigate bias; intergroup contact theory, introduced five years later, describes how recategorization can be achieved. Under the contact hypothesis, intergroup contact under certain conditions will reduce intergroup prejudice. Initially, Gordon Allport proposed four necessary conditions for this to occur: equal status, common goals, intergroup cooperation, and support of authorities, laws, or customs. To this, Pettigrew later added a fifth condition: friendship potential, that the contact must provide opportunity for individuals in each group to become friends.

Intergroup contact theory describes a three-stage sequence from contact to recategorization. First, groups come into contact and experience decategorization. Positive intergroup contact enables the formation of positive impressions of another group as individuals, reducing the salience of group identities in a process known as decategorization; this reduction in group salience further enhances the effect of intergroup contact. The necessary conditions for positive intergroup contact are relevant from this first stage, as decategorization is inhibited by negative contact and difference in status, each of which can reinforce group identities and contribute to intergroup hostility.

In the second stage, positive interpersonal relationships foster positive intergroup perceptions. If group identities become more salient following decategorization, the positive impressions of individuals in the outgroup can generalize to the outgroup as a whole. In a reversal of the first stage, salient group categorization is necessary; without a connection between the individual and the group, impressions of the individual cannot generalize to their group identity. Because group identity is more salient for more normative group members, contact with individuals who are more prototypical of their group increases generalization; however, high prototypicality is not a prerequisite of generalization.

In the third stage, after sufficient positive perceptions have been built, categorizations of "us" and "them" can merge into a collective "we" that encompasses both original groups. This final stage is recategorization, and at this stage intergroup prejudice is most reduced—by nature, prejudice towards those who share a superordinate group at this stage would be intragroup discrimination. This three-stage process is not always completed—groups can cease contact at any time and achieving one stage does not mean that the next stage will be reached. Still, each stage reduces conflict even when independent of the others and facilitates the achievement of other the later stages.

Alternatively, some degree of recategorization may be achieved when individuals are led to believe that they share immutable traits with an outgroup.

== Dual-identity recategorization ==
While recategorization necessarily involves a shift in salient identities, dual-identity recategorization activates both original identities and a new identity simultaneously. This is distinguished from recategorization that results in a single salient identity and a suppressed or replaced original identity, which is referred to as single-identity recategorization. In many contexts, dual-identity recategorization is preferable to single-identity recategorization due to the difficulty in overriding and replacing established identities. Certain identities (e.g., racial and national identities) are entrenched over years of life and continuously fortified through interactions that make them salient; dual-identity recategorization is particularly well-suited to situations where the preexisting identities are of this kind. Dual-identity recategorization also facilitates comparison between the subgroups contained by a superordinate group. When this process reveals unjust disparities to the majority subgroup, it can spur the majority subgroup to action to correct what is seen as a moral violation against those who, post-recategorization, are considered ingroup members.

However, dual-identity recategorization also faces a unique difficulties that can inflame, rather than abate, intergroup tensions. Additionally, in some contexts, it can also be weaker than single-identity recategorization: in a study of European Portuguese and African Portuguese children, African Portuguese children in the single-identity recategorization condition reacted more positively towards European Portuguese children than African Portuguese children in the dual-identity recategorization condition. Members of the African Portuguese minority group preferred a single-identity recategorization that solidified their position as part of a unified Portuguese culture over a dual-identity recategorization that opposed assimilation by emphasizing existing subgroup identities; this may also be the case in other contexts where the integration of groups is relatively recent and assimilation is preferred by each group.

== Challenges ==
The challenges facing recategorization efforts can be broadly categorized as obstacles to achieving recategorization, difficulty in maintaining a recategorized superordinate identity, and unintended consequences of attempted recategorization.

=== Achieving recategorization ===
In intergroup contact theory, recategorization is achieved as the final state of a three-stage process that can be halted at any time and often goes uncompleted, and both single- and dual-identity recategorizations can be difficult to fully realize. Achieving single-identity recategorization requires that an inactivated or new identity replaces a preexisting salient identity. Identities are acquired over the course of life, and attempts to replace ingrained identities (e.g., race) with ephemeral identities (e.g., employer) can fail. Also of concern is identity threat: as the identities that people hold are threatened by deemphasis and reduced positive distinctiveness, people are motivated to emphasize the identities that they hold. Identity threat is of particular concern in circumstances where groups are not similarly prototypical of their superordinate identity. As only the group that is more prototypical (and typically, more powerful) has a strong claim to the superordinate identity, giving up a distinct identity can be costly and undesirable to less-prototypical groups that would be held to the standards of a superordinate identity that does not reflect their values.

Dual-identity recategorization alleviates some of these difficulties—namely, the difficulty in supplanting an existing identity—but it still must contend with conditions that reinforce the original categorization and likely conflict with the desired recategorization.

=== Maintaining recategorization ===
Many of the same factors that make it difficult to achieve successful recategorization also threaten to reverse the process. The systems and social forces which ingrained the original categorizations may facilitate their return by continuing to make the original categorizations salient and by disregarding or actively combating identification with a recategorized superordinate identity. As before, dual-identity recategorization has the advantage that the superordinate category introduced or made salient by recategorization does not oppose preexisting identities, but it still may be overcome if it is unsupported while its component subgroup identities are reinforced; in time, it may lose enough salience to become irrelevant.

=== Unintended consequences ===
When the positive distinctiveness of a group is threatened by single-identity recategorization, the identity threat felt by high-identifying group members may oppose a superordinate identity enough that they heighten their bias towards outgroups in order to reassert positive distinctiveness; in this way, attempting recategorization may actually increase intergroup bias. However, this reaction is not apparent when recategorization does not reduce the salience of preexisting identities (i.e., in dual-identity recategorization).

While the fact that dual-identity recategorization enables subgroup and superordinate identities to be salient simultaneously is often to its advantage, it can also reinforce intergroup hostility in unique ways. In conditions where the superordinate identity is perceived as a threat to the subgroup identities or in populations where the group hierarchy is contentious or seen as illegitimate, multiple subgroups may see themselves as prototypical of the superordinate group. According to the ingroup projection model, subgroups in these situations project their values and beliefs onto the shared superordinate group, and see themselves as embodying the superordinate group. Consequently, subgroups evaluate one another according to the attributes they associate with the superordinate group, which are reflections of the values and beliefs they ascribe to their own subgroup. The disparity between the attributes of each subgroup and the attributes assigned to the superordinate group leads to perceptions that the other subgroups violate shared group norms, resulting in conflict. Dual-identity recategorization in this circumstance can increase intergroup hostility by way of increasing the salience of a contested superordinate group identity that exacerbates underlying subgroup differences while retaining the subgroups themselves. As these tensions arise as a result of conflict between subgroups over a related superordinate group, dual-identity recategorization may be most beneficial (and least likely to backfire) when the superordinate group is unrelated to the preexisting subgroups. For instance, in recategorizing the members of two companies that are merging, it would be best to emphasize a superordinate identity based on support for a local sports team or another focus unrelated to the merger, rather than emphasizing the merged company as the superordinate identity (as that identity is related to the subgroups).

Reducing identification with original group identities, which can occur in both types of recategorization, has potentially undesirable effects as well. As collective action is motivated by a perception of inequality between groups, the erasure or reduced salience of group distinctions reduces support for collective action that could otherwise affect an inequitable status quo. Simultaneously, increased identification with a superordinate group can lead to greater bias towards salient outgroups to that identity; if this occurs, recategorization may not actually mitigate bias, but redirect it towards another outgroup.

== Applications ==
=== Understanding behavior ===
An important application of recategorization is in understanding how groups combine, change, and come into conflict in the world. To this end, recategorization has been applied to a range of topics including corporate board appointments, foundational studies in social psychology, and attitude shifts in Zanzibari politics.

=== Bias reduction ===
Recategorization has long been used to reduce bias and increase group cohesion. Several interventions have been tested or proposed with the goal of reducing bias. Although it is not referred to as such, recategorization policies were included in the 2003 Rwandan constitution in an effort to reduce discrimination following the Rwandan Genocide.

==== Interventions ====
Recategorization interventions have shown promise as a means of reducing bias. In studies of schoolchildren, recategorization appeared effective in reducing bias towards a racial outgroup, and intergroup attitudes in children who experienced recategorization remained more positive than attitudes in children who did not experience recategorization at a follow-up three weeks after the intervention. Large-scale interventions through policy changes have also been proposed. However, some studies of recategorization interventions have failed to demonstrate a significant effect on prejudice or discrimination. Other researchers have asserted that it is unrealistic to assume that recategorization can result in a lasting reduction of bias, citing post-genocide Rwanda as a setting where lasting recategorization and stereotype change would be difficult to achieve.

==== Recategorization policy in Rwanda ====
In 1994, approximately 800,000 Tutsi, Twa, and moderate Hutu Rwandans were killed in the Rwandan Genocide. In 2003, the Republic of Rwanda adopted language into its constitution prohibiting discrimination and ethnic divisionism; this prohibits the collection of data that recognizes ethnic identity, as well as emphasis on and identification with ethnic identities. The Hutu, Tutsi, and Twa identities are now taught to be inventions of Belgian colonizers, and Banyarwanda—"those who come from Rwanda"—is now the only legally acceptable ethnic-national identity for many Rwandan citizens. This enforced single identity, intended to replace all previous identities, is an example of state-sponsored and enforced single-identity recategorization.

Discussing and disclosing ethnicity in Rwanda is, in most contexts, now taboo. While research is limited by this prohibition, one study by Moss (2014) found that support for the policy varies, with some Hutu and Tutsi individuals supportive of the unified identity and some rejecting the policy entirely. The most common position was between those extremes, with many Rwandans expressing support for the goals of recategorization policy but criticizing the means by which it is enforced or the breadth of the restrictions on speech. However, many Twa individuals have outright rejected the government's ethnic recategorization, under which they were newly designated as "historically marginalized peoples"—a term one Twa individual referred to as "a word cursed by god." Attempted erasure of the Twa identity and the "historically marginalized peoples" label are both actively resisted and many Twa feel that recategorization policy has led to increased marginalization.

== See also ==
- Bias
- John Dovidio
