= The Nature of Prejudice =

Social psychology book

- Author: Gordon Allport
- Language: English
- Subject: Psychology of prejudice
- Genre: Non-fiction
- Publisher: Addison-Wesley
- Publication date: 1954
- Publication place: United States
- Media type: Print

The Nature of Prejudice is a 1954 social psychology book by American psychologist Gordon Allport, on the topic of prejudice.

== Content ==
The book was written by Gordon Allport in the early 1950s and first published by Addison-Wesley in 1954. Thomas F. Pettigrew and Kerstin Hammann selected, as the book's most lasting contribution, its success in redefining the relation between intergroup contact and prejudice. While some previous scholars argued that contact between different groups leads to increased prejudice and conflict, Allport argued to the contrary, a view that Pettigrew and Hammann describe as supported by "literally hundreds of studies from dozens of nations".

Another idea introduced in the book became known as Allport's Scale, a measure of prejudice starting from antilocution and ending up at genocidal extermination. In simpler terms, Allport argued that even simple prejudice, if left unchecked, can develop into an extreme form.

== Impact and significance ==
The book was called a classic a decade after its initial publication, in 1965. Irwin Katz, writing in Political Psychology in 1991 on the topic of "classics in political psychology", called the book a landmark and "one of the most influential and often-cited publications in the entire field of intergroup relations". In 2016 Pettigrew and Hammann described the book as "probably the most read volume in the history of social psychology", noting that it has received numerous translations and remains influential in the modern study of prejudice. In a volume published roughly on the fiftieth anniversary of the book's original debut, On the Nature of Prejudice: Fifty Years after Allport (2008), the authors referred to Allport's book as "the fundamental work for social psychology of prejudice" and the most widely cited work on the subject, still used in teaching and quoted in modern research. Most contemporary research on how racism shapes public opinion is rooted in The Nature of Prejudice.

A further influence of the book was the later formulation of the common ingroup identity theory. Pettigrew and Hammann also credit Allport's ideas with influencing government policies, in the United States and elsewhere, which have successfully reduced levels of prejudice.

Describing the book's significance, Katz noted that it "defined the field of intergroup relations for social psychologist as the study of prejudice and its effects on group interactions". He noted, however, that Allport's assumption that prejudice causes discrimination has still to be proven beyond doubt; though other scholars also stressed that many of other assumptions Allport expressed in the book have become accepted since its publication.

In addition to being highly influential in the field of social psychology, the revised (and shortened) second edition of the book (The Nature of Prejudice: Abridged) published in 1958 was also a success on the mass market, being written in a relatively simple way that was accessible to a general readership. One of the reasons for its success, in Pettigrew and Hammann's opinion, was the boldness of its topic: while targeting a white, Protestant, American, and mostly male readership, it discussed numerous examples of anti-African-American, anti-Jewish, anti-Catholic, and anti-female prejudices.
