= Labels of primary potency =

"Labels of primary potency" (LoPP) describe the salient and powerful social labels that "act like shrieking sirens, deafening us to all finer discriminations that we might otherwise perceive." The term was coined by Gordon Allport in his book, The Nature of Prejudice. These labels usually have negative connotations. Labels of primary potency are formed in the same ways as those in labeling theory, and these labels are usually highly visible features, such as disabilities (e.g. feeble-minded, cripple, blind man), and skin colour. Such features are magnified and stand out in a person's mind amongst the other features of a man's complex nature, thus masking other important attributes of the individual. As a result, social objects lose their individuality. Furthermore, these qualities may not be accurate for a given individual, thus fostering misconceptions.

== Effects in society ==
=== Ethnicity ===
The effects of LoPP are salient in a few areas, one of which is in the perception of ethnicity. Negative ethnic labelling draws attention to the "otherness" of the group or person being named. "It is a particularly potent form of abuse because it leaves the addressee feeling powerless; that they have been arbitrarily dumped into a morass of negative perceptions which allows no recognition of them as acceptable individuals."

Although LoPP tend to be associated with negative perceptions, Allport also noted the experiment conducted by Razran (1950), which shows that "not all stereotypes of out-groups are unfavorable."

=== Appearance ===
LoPP may also represent goals that other groups aspire to. For instance, many East Asians strive to be fairer or more "white" skinned. Though aiming to achieve "whiteness" may seem positive in potential social effects for an individual, it still is a label that blinds every other trait of a single person and reduces the person to their skin colour - possibly outcasting those who cannot fit into the mould. This is especially evident in China, where the idea of being "white" is a sign of social status having long been associated with the ideal of being "beautiful" in the eyes of Eastern societies. Chinese advertisers have been using proverbs (such as 一白遮三丑 which implies that being "white" will mask "ugly" traits about a person) and models with fair skin tones to draw on the LoPP of "whiteness" as part of ethnic identity development which in turn, maintains the growth in product consumption.

The use of LoPP can also be observed in the American market where - whether intentional or not - advertisers often draw on LoPPs in their marketing strategies, which serves to reinforce the stereotypes evoked n LoPPs. MacGregor (2015) records examples of LoPP used in multi-ethnic marketing environments.

Historically, the Negro was used in many negative ways in advertising. Traditionally such products as Gold Dust Washing Powder, Bock Beer, Walker's Deluxe Bourbon, Aunt Jemima baking mixes, Cream O'Wheat, showed the Negro in servile employment. Their black skin was used to contrast whiteness against blackness.
Martinez believes that advertisers and mass media that utilize and show Mexicans have selectively presented and exaggerated racial and ethnic cultural characteristics. The consequences, to Martinez, are logical; the Mexicans are portrayed as being naturally inferior to the majority of the audience. This fact then gives esteem to the values and beliefs of the majority and detracts from the "used" minority. He also believes that for the majority of television viewers, in this instance, to find nothing objectionable, or distasteful, about an advertiser's image of Mexicans suggests tacit agreement with that image (p.5)

— Robert M. MacGregor, "Labels of Primary Potency in Multi-Ethnic Marketing Environments" (2015)

=== Gender ===
Another area in which LoPP are frequently used is in the discussion of gender. McConnell-Ginet (2003) explains the connotations of LoPP relating to gender in the examples below.

- (1c) I'm not a feminist, but ...

Here the but shows that the speaker rejects the label probably due to the negative stereotypes associated with it.

- (1f) What a slut (s/he is)!

Here, the speaker attributes sexual promiscuity to the labeled person. This label typically evokes a female image. It can be used both to mock or reinforce sexual double standards, depending on the context.

=== Education ===
In a resource for teachers with regards to the language within a classroom, it was written that labels in such environments are possibly laden with negative connotations and relative to specific cultures, "serving to erase individuality through categorisation and generalisation, and to dehumanise or reductively cast the individual." For example, LoPP may be used in a classroom, and "reactions to the names we have been called and the reactions of those we have labeled testify to their power."

Another resource for teachers adds that such labels are an obstruction to being able to see "the fuller person" - referring to the LoPP reducing the person to just the said single trait. Both resources encourage implementing the use of non-stigmatised language in classrooms to empower learners such that the focus is shifted from picking out differences to finding common curiosities, where social labels do not hinder pupils' development in any way.

=== Politics ===
Currently in the United States of America, the Left is branded as socialist, baby-killing anti-Semites by the Right, while the Right are called hypocrites, pro-life anti-vaxxers. These ideas are further encouraged by politically-motivated news outlets contributing to media bias in the United States. "Left" and "right" are now labels that are used to disparage the other political camp, and both sides benefit from planting negative connotations that are possibly used to mislead their believers.

In contrast, European post-communist countries, such as Poland, have been found to not possess a clear-cut definition between the Left and Right. Political representatives in the said country occasionally dismiss assigned labels, most likely to reject differing weak associations tied to each label throughout post-communist states.

=== Other examples ===
In the Indian caste system, the people who belong to the lowest caste (Dalit), are often referred to as "untouchables". Here, "untouchables" qualifies as a LoPP, since it essentially dims out other traits of an individual and focuses on the negative social connotation of them, as compared to members of other castes.

== Psychological effects of labels of primary potency ==
Ashworth & Humphrey (1997) posit that "perceivers are motivated to label a social object so as to not only foster understanding and consensus, but to enhance their self-image relative to the object and to control the object." The desire to appear superior may be linked to expressions of dominance.

The essence of labels of primary potency is that a single, powerful label can prime one's mind in such a way that we are not able to put anything irrelevant to the label in focus. It is then a possibility that the acceptance of a certain label by an individual increases the probability of them performing predicted actions to maintain those particular beliefs. This is known as a self-fulfilling prophecy.

Labels of primary potency that are perpetuated by the receivers will then add to the continued social conditioning of the givers, such that the connotations behinds specific labels are kept and continued, which may affect future processing of related representations.

== See also ==
- Association fallacy
- Categorical perception
- Categorization
- Discrimination
- Master status
- Multi-label classification
- Prejudice
- Self-categorization theory
- Social stigma
- Stereotype
