= Labeling theory =

Sociological theory

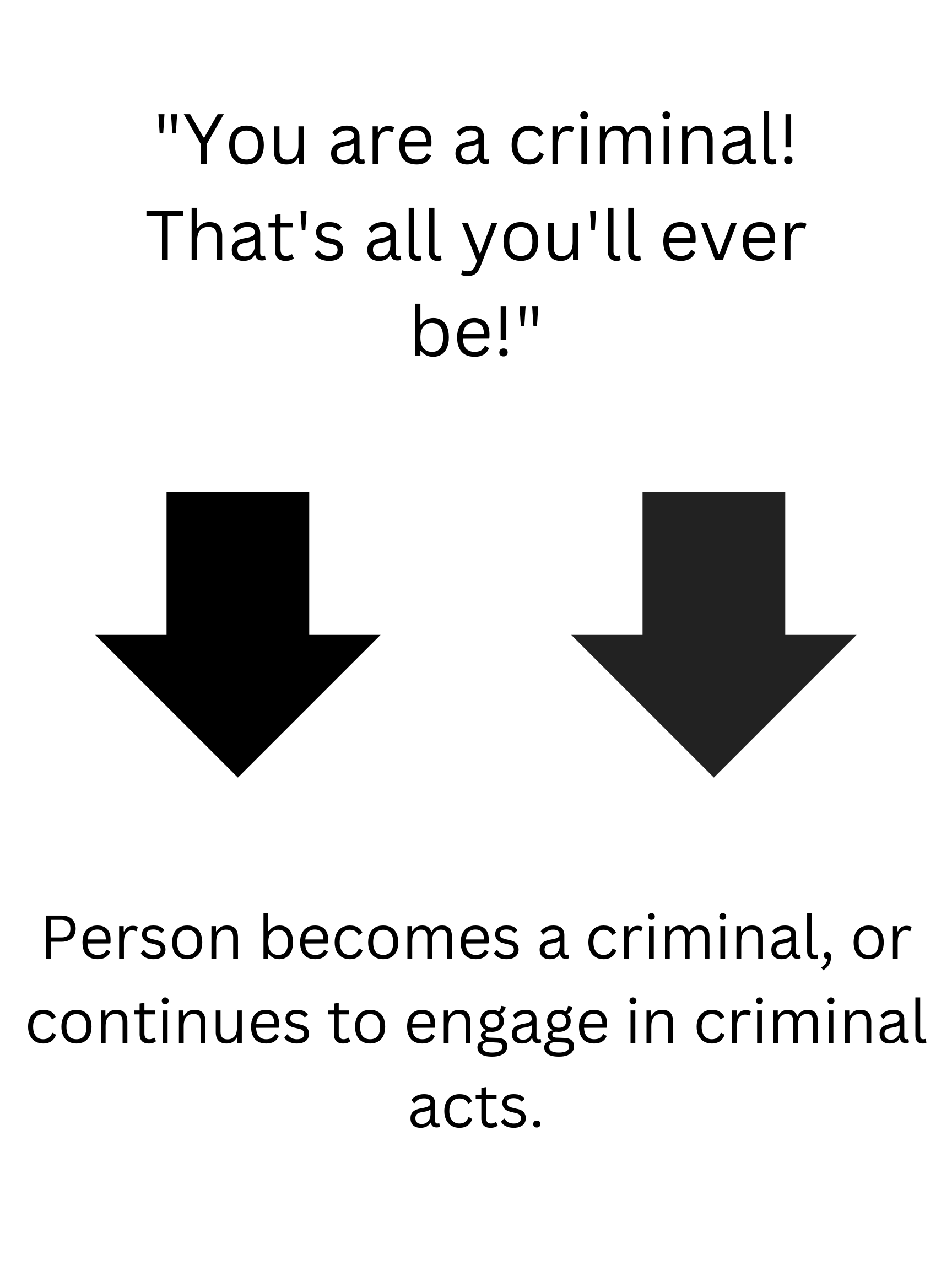
A brief representation of the idea behind labeling theory

Labeling theory posits that self-identity and the behavior of individuals may be determined or influenced by the terms used to describe or classify them. It is associated with the concepts of self-fulfilling prophecy and stereotyping. Labeling theory holds that deviance is not inherent in an act, but instead focuses on the tendency of majorities to negatively label minorities or those seen as deviant from standard cultural norms. The theory was prominent during the 1960s and 1970s, and some modified versions of the theory have developed and are still currently popular. Stigma is defined as a powerfully negative label that changes a person's self-concept and social identity.

Labeling theory is closely related to social-construction and symbolic-interaction analysis. Labeling theory was developed by sociologists during the 1960s. Howard Saul Becker's book Outsiders was extremely influential in the development of this theory and its rise to popularity.

Labeling theory is also connected to other fields besides crime. For instance there is the labeling theory that corresponds to homosexuality. Alfred Kinsey and his colleagues were the main advocates in separating the difference between the role of a "homosexual" and the acts one does. An example is the idea that males performing feminine acts would imply that they are homosexual. Thomas J. Scheff states that labeling also plays a part with the "mentally ill". The label does not refer to criminal but rather acts that are not socially accepted due to mental disorders.

== Theoretical basis ==
=== George Herbert Mead ===
One of the founders of social interactionism, George Herbert Mead, focused on the internal processes of how the mind constructs one's self-image. In Mind, Self & Society (1934), he showed how infants come to know persons first and only later come to know things. According to Mead, thought is both a social and pragmatic process, based on the model of two persons discussing how to solve a problem. Mead's central concept is the self, the part of an individual's personality composed of self-awareness and self-image.

=== Frank Tannenbaum ===
Frank Tannenbaum first introduced the idea of "tagging." Kerry Townsend (2001) writes about the revolution in criminology caused by Tannenbaum's work:

"The roots of Frank Tannenbaum's theoretical model, known as the 'dramatization of evil' or labeling theory, surfaces in the mid- to late-thirties. At this time, the 'New Deal' legislation had not defeated the woes of the Great Depression, and, although dwindling, immigration into the United States continued. The social climate was one of disillusionment with the government. The class structure was one of cultural isolationism; cultural relativity had not yet taken hold. 'The persistence of the class structure, despite the welfare reforms and controls over big business, was unmistakable.'

"One of the central tenets of the theory is to encourage the end of labeling process. In the words of Frank Tannenbaum, 'the way out is through a refusal to dramatize the evil", the justice system attempts to do this through diversion programs. The growth of the theory and its current application, both practical and theoretical, provide a solid foundation for continued popularity."

Tannenbaum discusses criminal behavior, with a focus on those who commit crimes professionally or as a career. He classifies criminals into six types: occasional, financially motivated, vagrants, unintentional, mentally ill, and professional. Frank Tannenbaum's explanation of Labeling Theory highlighted the negative consequences of police interactions with children which argues that arresting youth leads to a "dramatization of evil". His research indicated that youth being arrested and labeled as criminals shapes their self-perception to fit that label.

=== Edwin Lemert ===
Edwin M. Lemert was an influential American sociologist and criminologist known for his contributions to labeling theory and the study of social deviance. He introduced the concepts of primary and secondary deviance—primary deviance being minor, initial acts of rule-breaking that don't alter self-identity, and secondary deviance occurring when an individual internalizes the deviant label imposed by society, leading to further deviant behavior. Lemert's work emphasized how societal reactions to deviance can reinforce and escalate it, shaping an individual's identity as deviant. Lemert's popular books, such as "Social Pathology" (1951) and "Human Deviance, Social Problems, and Social Control" (1967), have had a lasting impact on criminology and sociology. Edwin Lemert writes: "His acts are repeated and organized subjectively and transformed into active roles and become the social criteria for assigning status.…When a person begins to employ his deviant behavior or a role based on it as a means of defense, attack, or adjustment to the overt and covert problems created by the consequent societal reaction to him, his deviation is secondary."

=== Howard Becker ===
While it was Lemert who introduced the key concepts of labeling theory, it was Howard Becker who became their successor. He first began describing the process of how a person adopts a deviant role in a study of dance musicians, with whom he once worked. He later studied the identity formation of marijuana smokers. This study was the basis of his Outsiders published in 1963. This work became the manifesto of the labeling theory movement among sociologists. In his opening, Becker writes:

"…social groups create deviance by making rules whose infraction creates deviance, and by applying those rules to particular people and labeling them as outsiders. From this point of view, deviance is not a quality of the act the person commits, but rather a consequence of the application by other of rules and sanctions to an 'offender.' The deviant is one to whom that label has been successfully applied; deviant behavior is behavior that people so label."

While society uses the stigmatic label to justify its condemnation, the deviant actor uses it to justify his actions. He wrote: "To put a complex argument in a few words: instead of the deviant motives leading to the deviant behavior, it is the other way around, the deviant behavior in time produces the deviant motivation."

Becker's immensely popular views were also subjected to a barrage of criticism, most of it blaming him for neglecting the influence of other biological, genetic effects and personal responsibility. In a later 1973 edition of his work, he answered his critics. He wrote that sociologists, while dedicated to studying society, are often careful not to look too closely. Instead, he wrote: "I prefer to think of what we study as collective action. People act, as Mead and Blumer have made clearest, together. They do what they do with an eye on what others have done, are doing now, and may do in the future. One tries to fit his own line of action into the actions of others, just as each of them likewise adjusts his own developing actions to what he sees and expects others to do."

Francis Cullen reported in 1984 that Becker was probably too generous with his critics. After 20 years, Becker's views, far from being supplanted, have been corrected and absorbed into an expanded "structuring perspective."

=== Albert Memmi ===
In The Colonizer and the Colonized (1965), Albert Memmi described the deep psychological effects of the social stigma created by the domination of one group by another. He wrote:

The longer the oppression lasts, the more profoundly it affects him (the oppressed). It ends by becoming so familiar to him that he believes it is part of his own constitution, that he accepts it and could not imagine his recovery from it. This acceptance is the crowning point of oppression.

In Dominated Man (1968), Memmi turned his attention to the motivation of stigmatic labeling: it justifies the exploitation or criminalization of the victim. He wrote:

Why does the accuser feel obliged to accuse in order to justify himself? Because he feels guilty toward his victim. Because he feels that his attitude and his behavior are essentially unjust and fraudulent.… Proof? In almost every case, the punishment has already been inflicted. The victim of racism is already living under the weight of disgrace and oppression.… In order to justify such punishment and misfortune, a process of rationalization is set in motion, by which to explain the ghetto and colonial exploitation.

Central to stigmatic labeling is the attribution of an inherent fault: It is as if one says, "There must be something wrong with these people. Otherwise, why would we treat them so badly?"

=== Erving Goffman ===
Perhaps the most important contributor to labeling theory was Erving Goffman, President of the American Sociological Association (ASA), and one of America's most cited sociologists. His most popular books include The Presentation of Self in Everyday Life, Interaction Ritual, and Frame Analysis.

His most important contribution to labeling theory, however, was Stigma: Notes on the Management of Spoiled Identity published in 1963.

==== Goffman's key insights ====
The modern nation state's heightened demand for normalcy. Today's stigmas are the result not so much of ancient or religious prohibitions, but of a new demand for normalcy:

"The notion of the 'normal human being' may have its source in the medical approach to humanity, or in the tendency of large-scale bureaucratic organizations such as the nation state, to treat all members in some respects as equal. Whatever its origins, it seems to provide the basic imagery through which laymen currently conceive themselves."

Living in a divided world, deviants split their worlds into: (1) forbidden places where discovery means exposure and danger; (2) places where people of that kind are painfully tolerated; and (3) places where one's kind is exposed without need to dissimulate or conceal. Dealing with others is fraught with great complexity and ambiguity:

"When normals and stigmatized do in fact enter one another's immediate presence, especially when they attempt to maintain a joint conversational encounter, there occurs one of the primal scenes of sociology; for, in many cases, these moments will be the ones when the causes and effects of stigma will be directly confronted by both sides." "What are unthinking routines for normals can become management problems for the discreditable.… The person with a secret failing, then, must be alive to the social situation as a scanner of possibilities, and is therefore likely to be alienated from the simpler world in which those around them apparently dwell."

Society's demands are filled with contradictions:

On the one hand, a stigmatized person may be told that he is no different from others. On the other hand, he must declare his status as "a resident alien who stands for his group." "One has to convey the impression that the burden of the stigma is not too heavy yet keep himself at the required distance. "A phantom acceptance is allowed to provide the base for a phantom normalcy."

Familiarity need not reduce contempt. In spite of the common belief that openness and exposure will decrease stereotypes and repression, the opposite is true:

"Thus, whether we interact with strangers or intimates, we will still find that the fingertips of society have reached bluntly into the contact, even here putting us in our place."

=== David Matza ===
In On Becoming Deviant (1969), sociologist David Matza gives the most vivid and graphic account of the process of adopting a deviant role. The acts of authorities in outlawing a proscribed behavior can have two effects, keeping most out of the behavior, but also offering new opportunities for creating deviant identities. He says the concept of "affinity" does little to explain the dedication to the behavior. "Instead, it may be regarded as a natural biographical tendency born of personal and social circumstances that suggests but hardly compels a direction or movement."

What gives force to that movement is the development of a new identity:

"To be cast as a thief, as a prostitute, or more generally, a deviant, is to further compound and hasten the process of becoming that very thing."

"In shocked discovery, the subject now concretely understands that there are serious people who really go around building their lives around his activities—stopping him, correcting him, devoted to him. They keep records on the course of his life, even develop theories on how he got that way.... Pressed by such a display, the subject may begin to add meaning and gravity to his deviant activities. But he may do so in a way not especially intended by agents of the state."

"The meaningful issue of identity is whether this activity, or any of my activities can stand for me, or be regarded as proper indications of my being. I have done a theft, been signified a thief. am I a thief? To answer affirmatively, we must be able to conceive a special relationship between being and doing—a unity capable of being indicated. That building of meaning has a notable quality."

== The "criminal" ==
As an application of phenomenology, the theory hypothesizes that the labels applied to individuals influence their behavior, particularly the application of negative or stigmatizing labels (such as "criminal" or "felon") promote deviant behavior, becoming a self-fulfilling prophecy, i.e. an individual who is labeled has little choice but to conform to the essential meaning of that judgment. Consequently, labeling theory postulates that it is possible to prevent social deviance via a limited social shaming reaction in "labelers" and replacing moral indignation with tolerance. Emphasis is placed on the rehabilitation of offenders through an alteration of their labels. Related prevention policies include client empowerment schemes, mediation and conciliation, victim-offender forgiveness ceremonies (restorative justice), restitution, reparation, and alternatives to prison programs involving diversion. Labeling theory has been accused of promoting impractical policy implications, and criticized for failing to explain society's most serious offenses.

== The "mentally ill" ==
The social construction of deviant behavior plays an important role in the labeling process that occurs in society. This process involves not only the labeling of criminally deviant behavior, which is behavior that does not fit socially constructed norms, but also labeling that which reflects stereotyped or stigmatized behavior of the "mentally ill". In 1961 Thomas Szasz, in The Myth of Mental Illness, asked, "Who defines whom as troublesome or mentally sick?... [the one] who first seizes the word imposes reality on the other; [the one] who defines thus dominates and lives; and [the one] who is defined is subjugated and may be killed." Thomas J. Scheff in Being Mentally Ill challenged common perceptions of mental illness by claiming that mental illness is manifested solely as a result of societal influence. He argued that society views certain actions as deviant and, in order to come to terms with and understand these actions, often places the label of mental illness on those who exhibit them. Certain expectations are then placed on these individuals and, over time, they unconsciously change their behavior to fulfill them. Criteria for different mental illnesses are not consistently fulfilled by those who are diagnosed with them because all of these people suffer from the same disorder, they are simply fulfilled because the "mentally ill" believe they are supposed to act a certain way so, over time, come to do so. Scheff's theory had many critics, most notably Walter Gove who consistently argued against Scheff with an almost opposite theory; he believed that society has no influence at all on "mental illness". Instead, any societal perceptions of the "mentally ill" come about as a direct result of these people's behaviors. Most sociologists' views of labeling and mental illness have fallen somewhere between the extremes of Gove and Scheff. On the other hand, it is almost impossible to deny, given both common sense and research findings, that society's negative perceptions of "crazy" people has had some effect on them. It seems that, realistically, labeling can accentuate and prolong the issues termed "mental illness", but it is rarely the full cause.

Many other studies have been conducted in this general vein. To provide a few examples, several studies have indicated that most people associate being labeled mentally ill as being just as, or even more, stigmatizing than being seen as a drug addict, ex-convict, or prostitute (for example: Brand & Claiborn 1976). Additionally, Page's 1977 study found that self declared "ex-mental patients" are much less likely to be offered apartment leases or hired for jobs. Clearly, these studies and the dozens of others like them serve to demonstrate that labeling can have a very real and very large effect on the mentally ill. However, labeling has not been proven to be the sole cause of any symptoms of mental illness.

Peggy Thoits (1999) discusses the process of labeling someone with a mental illness in her article, "Sociological Approaches to Mental Illness". Working off Thomas Scheff's (1966) theory, Thoits claims that people who are labeled as mentally ill are stereotypically portrayed as unpredictable, dangerous, and unable to care for themselves. She also claims that "people who are labeled as deviant and treated as deviant become deviant." This statement can be broken down into two processes, one that involves the effects of self-labeling and the other differential treatment from society based on the individual's label. Therefore, if society sees mentally ill individuals as unpredictable, dangerous and reliant on others, then a person who may not actually be mentally ill but has been labeled as such, could become mentally ill.

Proponents of hard labeling, as opposed to soft labeling, believe that mental illness does not exist, but is merely deviance from norms of the social order, causing people to believe in mental illness. They view them as socially constructed illnesses and psychotic disorders.

== The "homosexual" ==
The application of labeling theory to homosexuality has been extremely controversial. It was Alfred Kinsey and his colleagues who pointed out the big discrepancy between the behavior and the role attached to it. They had observed the often negative consequences of labeling and repeatedly condemned labeling people as homosexual:

It is amazing to observe how many psychologists and psychiatrists have accepted this sort of propaganda, and have come to believe that homosexual males and females are discretely different from persons who respond to natural stimuli. Instead of using these terms as substantives which stand for persons, or even as adjectives to describe persons, they may better be used to describe the nature of the overt sexual relations, or of the stimuli to which an individual erotically responds.… It would clarify our thinking if the terms could be dropped completely out of our vocabulary.

Males do not represent two discrete populations, heterosexual and homosexual.… Only the human mind invents categories and tries to force facts into pigeonholes. The living world is a continuum in each and every one of its aspects.

The classification of sexual behavior as masturbatory, heterosexual, or homosexual, is, therefore, unfortunate if it suggests that only different types of persons seek out or accept each kind of sexual activity. There is nothing known in the anatomy or physiology of sexual response and orgasm which distinguishes masturbatory, heterosexual, or homosexual reactions.

In regard to sexual behavior, it has been possible to maintain this dichotomy only by placing all persons who are exclusively heterosexual in a heterosexual category and all persons who have any amount of experience with their own sex, even including those with the slightest experience, in a homosexual category.… The attempt to maintain a simple dichotomy on these matters exposes the traditional biases which are likely to enter whenever the heterosexual or homosexual classification of an individual is involved.

Erving Goffman's Stigma: Notes on the Management of Spoiled Identity distinguished between the behavior and the role assigned to it:

The term "homosexual" is generally used to refer to anyone who engages in overt sexual practices with a member of his own sex, the practice being called "homosexuality." This usage appears to be based on a medical and legal frame of reference and provides much too broad and heterogenous a categorization for use here. I refer only to individuals who participate in a special community of understanding wherein members of one's own sex are defined as the most desirable sexual objects, and sociability is energetically organized around the pursuit and entertainment of these objects.

Labeling theory was also applied to homosexuality by Evelyn Hooker and by Leznoff and Westley (1956), who published the first sociological study of the gay community. Erving Goffman and Howard Becker used the lives of gay-identified persons in their theories of labeling and interactionism. Simon and Gagnon likewise wrote: "It is necessary to move away from the obsessive concern with the sexuality of the individual, and attempt to see the homosexual in terms of the broader attachments that he must make to live in the world around him." British sociologist Mary McIntosh reflected the enthusiasm of Europeans for labeling theory in her 1968 study, "The Homosexual Role:"

"The vantage-point of comparative sociology enables us to see that the conception of homosexuality as a condition is, itself, a possible object of study. This conception and the behavior it supports operate as a form of social control in a society in which homosexuality is condemned.… It is interesting to notice that homosexuals themselves welcome and support the notion that homosexuality as a condition. For just as the rigid categorization deters people from drifting into deviancy, so it appears to foreclose on the possibility of drifting back into normalcy and thus removes the element of anxious choice. It appears to justify the deviant behavior of the homosexual as being appropriate for him as a member of the homosexual category. The deviancy can thus be seen as legitimate for him and he can continue in it without rejecting the norm of society."

Sara Fein and Elaine M. Nuehring (1981) were among the many who supported the application of labeling theory to homosexuality. They saw the gay role functioning as a "master status" around which other roles become organized. This brings a whole new set of problems and restrictions:

Placement in a social category constituting a master status prohibits individuals from choosing the extent of their involvement in various categories. Members of the stigmatized group lose the opportunity to establish their own personal system of evaluation and group membership as well as the ability to arrive at their own ranking of each personal characteristic.… For example, newly self-acknowledged homosexual individuals cannot take for granted that they share the world with others who hold congruent interpretations and assumptions; their behavior and motives, both past and present, will be interpreted in light of their stigma.

Perhaps the strongest proponent of labeling theory was Edward Sagarin. In his book, Deviants and Deviance, he wrote, "There are no homosexuals, transvestites, chemical addicts, suicidogenics, delinquents, criminals, or other such entities, in the sense of people having such identities." Sagarin's position was roundly condemned by academics in the gay community. Sagarin had written some gay novels under the pseudonym of Donald Webster Cory. According to reports, he later abandoned his gay identity and began promoting an interactionist view of homosexuality.

A number of authors adopted a modified, non-deviant, labeling theory. They rejected the stigmatic function of the gay role, but found it useful in describing the process of coming out and reconciling one's homosexual experiences with the social role. Their works includes:

- Homosexuals and the Military (1971);
- Dank, Barry M. (1971). "Coming out in the Gay World". Psychiatry. 34 (2): 180–197. doi:10.1080/00332747.1971.11023666. PMID 5553891.
- Hammersmith, Sue Kiefer; Weinberg, Martin S. (1973). "Homosexual Identity: Commitment, Adjustment, and Significant Others". Sociometry. 36 (1): 56–79. doi:10.2307/2786282. JSTOR 2786282. PMID 4710474.
- Male Homosexuals: Their Problems and Adaptations (1974);
- Identity and Community in the Gay World (1974);
- Shively, Michael G.; De Cecco, John P. (1977). "Components of Sexual Identity". Journal of Homosexuality. 3 (1): 41–48. doi:10.1300/j082v03n01_04. PMID 591712.
- Homosexualities: A Study of Diversity Among Men and Women (1978);
- Weinberg, Thomas S. (1979). "On "Doing" and "Being" Gay". Journal of Homosexuality. 4 (2): 143–168. doi:10.1300/j082v04n02_02. PMID 739145.
- Cass, Vivienne C. (1979). "Homosexual Identity Formation". Journal of Homosexuality. 4 (3): 219–235. doi:10.1300/j082v04n03_01. PMID 264126.
- Troiden, Richard R. (1979). "Becoming Homosexual: A Model of Gay Identity Acquisition". Psychiatry. 42 (4): 362–373. doi:10.1080/00332747.1979.11024039. PMID 504515.
- Sexual Preference: Its Development in Men and Women (1981);
- Coleman, ELI (1982). "Developmental Stages of the Coming-Out Process". American Behavioral Scientist. 25 (4): 469–482. doi:10.1177/000276482025004009.

Barry Adam (1976) took those authors to task for ignoring the force of the oppression in creating identities and their inferiorizing effects. Drawing upon the works of Albert Memmi, Adam showed how gay-identified persons, like Jews and blacks, internalize the hatred to justify their limitations of life choices. He saw the gravitation towards ghettos was evidence of the self-limitations:

A certain romantic liberalism runs through the literature, evident from attempts to paper over or discount the very real problems of inferiorization. Some researchers seem bent on 'rescuing' their subjects from 'defamation' by ignoring the problems of defeatism and complicit self-destruction. Avoidance of dispiriting reflection upon the day-to-day practice of dominated people appears to spring from a desire to 'enhance' the reputation of the dominated and magically relieve their plight. Careful observation has been sacrificed to the 'power of positive thinking.'

Strong defense of labeling theory also arose within the gay community. Dan Slater of the Los Angeles Homosexual Information Center said, "There is no such thing as a homosexual lifestyle. There is no such thing as gay pride or anything like that. Homosexuality is simply based on the sex act. Gay consciousness and all the rest are separatist and defeatist attitudes going back to centuries-old and out-moded conceptions that homosexuals are, indeed, different from other people." In a later article, Slater (1971) stated the gay movement was going in the wrong direction:

Is it the purpose of the movement to try to assert sexual rights for everyone or create a political and social cult out of homosexuality? …Persons who perform homosexual acts or other non-conforming acts are sexually free. They want others enlightened. They want hostile laws changed, but they resent the attempt to organize their lives around homosexuality just as much as they resent the centuries-old attempt to organize their lives around heterosexuality.

William DuBay (1967) describes gay identity as one strategy for dealing with society's oppression. It solves some problems but creates many more, replacing a closet of secrecy with one of gay identity. A better strategy, he suggests, is to reject the label and live as if the oppression did not exist. Quoting Goffman, he writes, "But of course what is a good adjustment for the individual can be an even better one for society."

DuBay contends that the attempt to define homosexuality as a class of persons to be protected against discrimination as defined in the statutes has not reduced the oppression. The goal of the movement instead should be to gain acceptance of homosexual relationships as useful and productive for both society and the family. The movement has lost the high moral ground by sponsoring the "flight from choice" and not taking up the moral issues. "Persons whom we confine to back rooms and bars other societies have honored as tenders of children, astrologers, dancers, chanters, minstrels, jesters, artists, shamans, sacred warriors and judges, seers, healers, weavers of tales and magic."

DuBay refers to the "gay trajectory," in which a person first wraps himself in the gay role, organizing his personality and his life around sexual behavior. He might flee from his family and home town to a large gay center. There, the bedeviling force of the stigma will introduce him to more excessive modes of deviance such as promiscuity, prostitution, alcoholism, and drugs. Many resist such temptations and try to normalize their life, but the fast lanes of gay society are littered with the casualties of gay identity. Some come to reject the label entirely. "Accomplishing the forbidden, they are neither gay nor straight. Again learning to choose, they develop the ability to make the ban ambiguous, taking responsibility and refusing explanations of their behaviors."

John Henry Mackay (1985) writes about a gay hustler in Berlin adopting such a solution: "What was self-evident, natural, and not the least sick did not require an excuse through an explanation.… It was love just like any other love. Whoever could not or would not accept it as love was mistaken."

== Modified labeling theory ==
Bruce Link and colleagues (1989) had conducted several studies which point to the influence that labeling can have on mental patients. Through these studies, taking place in 1987, 1989, and 1997, Link advanced a "modified labeling theory" indicating that expectations of labeling can have a large negative effect, that these expectations often cause patients to withdraw from society, and that those labeled as having a mental disorder are constantly being rejected from society in seemingly minor ways but that, when taken as a whole, all of these small slights can drastically alter their self concepts. They come to both anticipate and perceive negative societal reactions to them, and this potentially damages their quality of life.

Modified labeling theory has been described as a "sophisticated social-psychological model of 'why labels matter.'" In 2000, results from a prospective two-year study of patients discharged from a mental hospital (in the context of deinstitutionalization) showed that stigma was a powerful and persistent force in their lives, and that experiences of social rejection were a persistent source of social stress. Efforts to cope with labels, such as not telling anyone, educating people about mental distress/disorder, withdrawing from stigmatizing situations, could result in further social isolation and reinforce negative self-concepts. Sometimes an identity as a low self-esteem minority in society would be accepted. The stigma was associated with diminished motivation and ability to "make it in mainstream society" and with "a state of social and psychological vulnerability to prolonged and recurrent problems". There was an up and down pattern in self-esteem, however, and it was suggested that, rather than simply gradual erosion of self-worth and increasing self-deprecating tendencies, people were sometimes managing, but struggling, to maintain consistent feelings of self-worth. Ultimately, "a cadre of patients had developed an entrenched, negative view of themselves, and their experiences of rejection appear to be a key element in the construction of these self-related feelings" and "hostile neighbourhoods may not only affect their self-concept but may also ultimately impact the patient's mental health status and how successful they are."

== See also ==
- Attributional bias
- Attribute substitution
- Framing (social sciences)
- Labels of Primary Potency
- Linguistic relativity
- Moral entrepreneur
- Moral panic
- Nominative determinism
- Observer-expectancy effect
- Psychology
- Signaling theory
- Sociology of deviance
- Victim blaming

== Bibliography ==
- Adam, B. (1978). The Survival of Domination. New York: Elsevier. ISBN 978-0-444-99047-1.
- Becker, H. (1973) [1963]. Outsiders. New York: Free Press.
- Bell, A.; Weinberg, M. (1978). Homosexualities: a Study of Diversity Among Men and Women. New York: Simon and Schuster. ISBN 978-0-671-24212-1.
- Bell, A.; Weinberg, M.; Hammersmith, S. K. (1981). Sexual Preference: Its Development in Men and Women. Bloomington, IN: University of Indiana Press.
- Cass, V. (1979). "Homosexual Identity Formation: A Theoretical Model". Journal of Homosexuality. 4 (3): 219–235. doi:10.1300/j082v04n03_01. PMID 264126.
- Coleman, E. (1982). "Developmental Stages of the Coming Out Process". American Behavioral Scientist. 25 (4): 469–482. doi:10.1177/000276482025004009. S2CID 45606395.
- Cullen, F. (1984). Rethinking Crime and Deviance Theory. Totowa, NJ: Bowman and Allanheld. ISBN 978-0-86598-073-0.
- Dank, B. (1971). "Coming Out in the Gay World". Psychiatry. 34 (2): 180–197. doi:10.1080/00332747.1971.11023666. PMID 5553891.
- DuBay, W. (1967). Gay Identity: The Self Under Ban. Jefferson, NC: McFarland.
- Fein, S.; Nuehring, Elaine M. (1981). "Intrapsychic Effects of Stigma: a process of Breakdown and Reconstruction of Social Reality". Journal of Homosexuality. 7 (1): 4–6. doi:10.1300/j082v07n01_02. PMID 7345115.
- Goffman, E. (1959). The Presentation of Self in Everyday Life. New York: Anchor Books.
- Goffman, E. (1963). Stigma: Notes on the Management of Spoiled Identity. Englewood Cliffs, NY: Prentice-Hall.
- Goffman, E. (1974). Frame Analysis: An Essay on the Organization of Experience. Cambridge: Harvard University Press.
- Goffman, E. (1982). Interaction Ritual. New York: Pantheon Books.
- Gove, Walter R. (1975). Labelling of Deviance: Evaluating a Perspective. Hoboken: John Wiley & Sons Inc.
- Hammersmith, S. K.; Weinberg, M. (1973). "Homosexual Identity". Sociometry. 36 (1): 56–79. doi:10.2307/2786282. JSTOR 2786282. PMID 4710474.
- Hooker, E. (1956). "A Preliminary Analysis of Group Behavior of Homosexuals". Journal of Psychology. 42 (2): 217–225. doi:10.1080/00223980.1956.9713035.
- Hooker, E. (1958). "Male Homosexuality in the Rorschach". Journal of Projective Techniques. 22 (1): 33–54. doi:10.1080/08853126.1958.10380822. PMID 13514724.
- Hooker, E. (1967). Final Report of the Task Force on Homosexuality. Washington, D.C.: National Institute of Mental Health.
- Kinsey, A. C.; Pomeroy, W. P.; Martin, C. E.; Gebhard, P. H. (1953). Sexual Behavior in the Human Female. Philadelphia: W. B. Saunders.
- Kinsey, A. C.; Pomeroy, W. P.; Martin, C. E. (1948). Sexual Behavior in the Human Male. Philadelphia: W. B. Saunders.
- Lemert, E. M. (1951). Social Pathology. New York: Mcgraw-Hill.
- Leopold, A. (1975). "The Angry Men; Broadsides from the H. I. C.". In Touch.
- Leznoff, M.; Westley, W. A. (1956). "The Homosexual Community". Social Problems. 3 (4): 257–263. doi:10.2307/798680. JSTOR 798680.
- Link, Bruce G.; Cullen, Francis T.; Struening, Elmer; Shrout, Patrick E.; Dohrenwend, Bruce P. (1989). "A Modified Labeling Theory Approach to Mental Disorders: An Empirical Assessment". American Sociological Review. 54 (3): 400–423. doi:10.2307/2095613. JSTOR 2095613.
- Link, Bruce G.; Phelan, Jo C. (1999). "The Labelling Theory of Mental Disorder (II): The Consequences of Labeling". A Handbook for the Study of Mental Health: Social Contexts, Theories, and Systems. Cambridge: Cambridge University Press.
- Macionis, John J. (2012). Sociology (14th ed.). Boston: Pearson. ISBN 978-0-205-11671-3.
- Macionis, J.; Gerber, L. (2010). Sociology (7th ed.).
- Mackay, J. H. (1985). The Hustler. Boston: Alyson Publications. ISBN 978-0-932870-58-2.
- Matza, D. (1969). On Becoming Deviant. Englewood Cliffs, NJ: Prentice Hall.
- McIntosh, Mary (1968). "The Homosexual Role". Social Problems. 16 (2): 182–192. doi:10.2307/800003. JSTOR 800003.
- Mead, G. H. (1934). Mind, Self, and Society. Chicago: University of Chicago Press.
- Memmi, A. (1965). The Colonizer and the Colonized. New York: Orion Press.
- Memmi, A. (1968). Dominated Man. New York: Orion Press.
- O'Grady, William (2011). Crime in Canadian Context. Ontario: Oxford University Press.
- Sagarin, E. (1975). Deviants and Deviance. New York: Praeger. ISBN 978-0-275-50330-7.
- Scheff, Thomas J. (1984). Being Mentally Ill (2nd ed.). Piscataway: Aldine Transaction.
- Shively, M. G.; DeCecco, J. (1977). "Components of Sexual Identity". Journal of Homosexuality. 3 (1): 41–48. doi:10.1300/j082v03n01_04. PMID 591712.
- Simon, W.; Gagnon, J. H. (1967). "Homosexuality: The Formulation of a Psychological Perspective". Journal of Health and Social Behavior. 8 (3): 177–85. doi:10.2307/2948372. JSTOR 2948372. PMID 6073201.
- Slater, D. (1972). "No politically radical group or country has shown the slightest inclination to be more tolerant of homosexual behavior than middle class America". Vector: A Voice for the Homosexual Community. 8 (7): 28–29.
- Sumner, C. (1994). The Sociology of Deviance: an Obituary. New York: Continuum Publishing.
- Tannenbaum, F. (1938). Crime and Community. London and New York: Columbia University Press.
- Thoits, Peggy A. (1999). "Sociological approaches to mental illness". In Allan V. Horwitz & Teresa L. Scheid (ed.). A Handbook for the Study of Mental Health: Social Contexts, Theories, and Systems. Cambridge University Press. pp. 121–138. ISBN 978-0-521-56763-3.
- Troiden, T. (1979). "Becoming Homosexual: A model of Gay Identity Acquisition". Psychiatry. 42 (4): 362–373. doi:10.1080/00332747.1979.11024039. PMID 504515.
- Vito, Gennaro F.; Maahs, Jeffery R.; Holmes, Ronald M. (2006). Criminology: Theory, Research And Policy (2nd ed.). Sudbury: Jones & Bartlett.
- Warren, C. A. B. (1974). Identity and Community in the Gay World. New York: Wiley-Interscience. ISBN 978-0-471-92112-7.
- Weinberg, T. (1978). "On 'Doing' and 'Being' Gay: Sexual Behavior and Homosexual Male Self-Identity". Journal of Homosexuality. 14 (2): 143–168. doi:10.1300/j082v04n02_02. PMID 739145.
- Weinberg, M.; Williams, C. (1974). Male Homosexuals. New York: Oxford University Press.
- Williams, C.; Weinberg, M. (1971). Homosexuals and the Military. New York: Harper and Row.
- Wright, E. R.; Gronfein, W. P.; Owens, T. J. (2000). "Deinstitutionalization, Social Rejection, and the Self-Esteem of Former Mental Patients". Journal of Health and Social Behavior. 41 (1): 68–90. doi:10.2307/2676361. JSTOR 2676361. PMID 10750323.
