= Thomas J. Scheff =

American sociologist (1929–2025)

Thomas J. Scheff (1929 – 23 May 2025) was an American Professor, Emeritus, Department of Sociology at University of California, Santa Barbara. His fields of study were the emotional/relational world, mental illness, restorative justice, and collective violence. He held a BS from the University of Arizona in Physics (1950), and a PhD in sociology from the University of California (Berkeley) (1960). He was at University of Wisconsin from 1959 to 1963, when he joined the faculty at the University of California, Santa Barbara.

He was advisor to California State Legislature on the writing of the Lanterman, Petris, Short Bill, Later adopted in all of the other states, regulating involuntary commitment of persons deemed mentally ill.

He had honorary doctorates from the Karlstad University in Karlstad, Sweden (2003), and University of Copenhagen, Denmark (2008), and he held visiting appointments at Carleton University, Canada, Oslo U., Norway, Lund and Karlstad Universities, Sweden. He was a Chair of the section on the Sociology of Emotions, American Sociological Association, and President of the Pacific Sociological Association.

His fields of research were social psychology, emotions, mental illness, restorative justice and collective violence. His current studies concern solidarity-alienation and the emotional/relational world. One of his books, Emotions and the Social Bond, concerns part/whole, a unified approach to theory and method in the human sciences.

Scheff died on May 23, 2025 at the age of 95.

== Publications ==
=== Books ===
- 2011 What's Love Got to Do with It? The Emotional World of Pop Songs. Boulder: Paradigm Publishers
- 2006 Goffman Unbound: A New Paradigm for Social Science. Paradigm Publishers.
- 2002 Toward a sociological imagination: bridging specialized fields. Co-edited with Bernard Phillips and Harold Kincaid. University Press of America
- 1997 Emotions, the Social Bond, and Human Reality: Part/Whole Analysis Cambridge University Press
- 1996 Strategy for Community Conferences: Shame and the Social Bond (with S. Retzinger), B. Galaway and J. Hudson, Eds.). International Perspectives on Restorative Justice. Crim. Justice Press
- 1996 Crime, Shame, and Community: Mediation against Violence. Wellness Foundation/ U. of California, Distinguished Lecture Series, Vol. VI.
- 1994 Bloody Revenge: Emotion, Nationalism and War. Westview Press (Reissued by iUniverse 2000).\
- 1991 Emotion and Violence: Shame and Rage in Destructive Conflicts. (with S. M. Retzinger) Lexington Books. (Reissued in 2001 by iUniverse)
- 1990 Microsociology: Emotion, Discourse, and Social Structure. Univ. of Chicago Press
- 1979 Catharsis in Healing, Ritual and Drama University of California Press (Reissued by iUniverse 2001)
- 1975 Labeling Madness. Spectrum Books
- 1967 Mental Illness and Social Processes. Harper and Row, (edited collection of articles)
- 1966 Being Mentally III: A Sociological Theory. Aldine Press. New Editions, 1984, and 1989

=== Selected Journal articles ===
- 2007 Hidden Emotions: Responses to a War Memorial Peace and Conflict: Journal of Peace Psychology 13(2), 1–9.
- 2001 Curtailment of emotions in pop songs and novels. Journal of Mundane Behavior 4.
- 2001 Social Components in Depression. Psychiatry. 64, # 3, 212–224.
- 1997 A Vision of Sociology: 1996 PSA Presidential Address. Sociological Perspectives 40: 529-538.
- 1996 Academic Gangs. Crime, Law, and Social Change, 23, 157–162
- 1988 Shame and Conformity: The Deference/Emotion System. American Sociological Review, June. 53, 395-406
- 1974 The Labeling Theory of Mental Illness American Sociological Review, 39, pp. 444–452
- 1967 Toward a Sociological Model of Consensus American Sociological Review, (February) pp. 32–46.
