= Leo Postman =

American psychologist (1918–2004)

- Born: Leo Joseph Postman; June 7, 1918; St. Petersburg, Russia
- Died: April 22, 2004 (aged 85); Marblehead, Massachusetts, United States
- Education: City College of New York; Harvard University
- Known for: Human memory
- Spouse: Dorothy Lerman Postman
- Awards: Warren Medal of the Society of Experimental Psychologists (1974)
- Scientific career
- Fields: Psychology
- Workplaces: University of California, Berkeley
- Thesis: The time-error in auditory perception (1946)
- Doctoral students: Marcia K. Johnson; David McNeill

Leo Joseph Postman (June 7, 1918 – April 22, 2004) was a Russian-born American psychologist known for his research on human memory.

== Career ==
He taught at the University of California, Berkeley from 1950 to his retirement in 1987. In 1961, he founded Berkeley's Institute of Human Learning, which later became the Institute for Cognitive and Brain Sciences. He was a member of the National Academy of Sciences and the American Psychological Association, as well as the president of the Western Psychological Association in 1968.

In 1974, he was awarded the Warren Medal from the Society of Experimental Psychologists.

== Death and legacy ==
He died of heart failure at his home in Marblehead, Massachusetts on April 22, 2004. His 2005 obituary in American Psychologist described him as "one of the most prolific psychologists of the last century".

== See also ==
- Gordon Allport – Postman's teacher
