= Psychology of social class =

Branch of social psychology

The psychology of social class is a branch of social psychology dedicated to understanding how social class affects individual's thoughts, feelings, and behaviors. While social class has long been a subject of analysis in fields such as sociology, political science, anthropology, medicine and epidemiology, its emergence within the field of psychology is much more recent.

== Defining social class ==
Social class is often defined inconsistently, or not at all, within the social sciences. Definitions tend to focus either on the essential properties of social class (i.e., conceptual definitions) or on how social class is measured (i.e., operational definitions). Conceptual definitions often define social class as a "cultural identity encompassing both a person's objective resources and their subjective rank relative to others." Whereas operational definitions describe social class as "a reflection of one's social position, measured by income, education, and occupation." Additionally, the terms social class and socioeconomic status are often used interchangeably as both tend focus on an individual's material or economic resources and on their social position relative to others.

Definitions of social class also vary on the extent to which they emphasize objective or subjective elements of social class. Objective definitions tend to focus on income, education, and occupation and suggest that higher social class is attained through having more money, being more educated, and having greater occupational prestige than others. Alternatively, subjective definitions focus on individuals' perceived rank relative to others and suggest that higher social class is attained through one's belief that they rank higher than others because they "perceive that they have more money, a more advanced education, and/or a more prestigious occupation than others."

While definitions of social class remain inconsistent, definitions in social psychology tend to focus on both the objective and subjective elements and most often define social class as a dimension of the self and/or a cultural identity "rooted in objective material resources and subjective perceptions of rank vis-a-vis others."

== Measurements ==
Similar to definitions of social class, measurements of social class tend to focus on the objective and/or subjective dimensions of class.

=== Objective measures ===
Measures of objective social class in psychology have primarily focused on education, income, and/or occupation. Educational attainment is often viewed as a "gateway" to higher social class and therefore is frequently considered to be the most fundamental measure of social class. For example, advanced education leads to increased income. and access to professional networks. Someone with a four-year college degree will earn twice as much money in their lifetime as someone with a high-school degree. Income, however, provides the most direct assessment of people's access to material goods (e.g., food, clothing, and shelter) and also predicts an array of psychological variables such as well being, social trust, personality, and prosocial behavior. One's occupation also provides important signals of social class. In psychology, occupation is most often measured in the form of occupational prestige, or the admiration and respect given to a particular job in society. For example, jobs with higher occupational prestige tend to be more admired and respected within society, and are often held by those with high levels of educational attainment and usually come with higher salaries (e.g., lawyers, doctors). Alternatively, occupations with lower prestige tend to be less admired and respected in society, pay less money, and are frequently held by people who are less educated (e.g., construction workers, janitors).

=== Subjective measures ===
While objective measures such as education, income, and occupation are important indices of social class, people's subjective perceptions of where they sit relative to others has been found to impact psychological functioning above and beyond objective measures. The MacArthur Scale of Subjective Social Status is the most widely-used measure of social class rank relative to others. In this measure, people are asked to rank themselves on a ladder with 10 rungs which represent ascending levels of income, education, and occupation:

"Think of this ladder as representing where people stand in the United States.

At the top of the ladder are the people who are the best off - those who have the most money, the most education, and the most respected jobs. At the bottom are the people who are the worst off - who have the least money, least education, and the least respected jobs or no job. The higher up you are on this ladder, the closer you are to the people at the very top; the lower you are, the closer you are to the people at the very bottom.

Where would you place yourself on this ladder?

Please place a large "X" on the rung where you think you stand at this time in your life, relative to other people in the United States"

This measure can also be easily adapted to reflect relative rankings among one's local community or subsets of society. For example, in place of "...in the United States" one could measure perceptions of subjective rank in one's community by replacing this text with "... in their communities" and asking them to place themselves on the ladder "relative to other people in their community." Research using both the local and societal level ladders demonstrates that subjective perceptions of one's social class relative to others are important and distinct dimensions of social class.

== Research ==
=== Social class as a cultural identity ===
In the first wave of research on the psychology of social class, social classes were conceived as a form of cultural identity. In this sense, individuals come to embody class-specific thoughts, feelings, and behaviors through learned norms, values, and expectations shared by others of similar social class backgrounds. These norms, values, and expectations are then expressed through cultural practices such as food consumption, taste in art and music, language, clothing, and ways for expressing oneself and adjusting to others. The first theoretical account positing social class as a cultural identity contends that social class reflects more than just the material resources that individuals possess, and that objective resources shape individual's cultural practices and behaviors that signal social class. Individuals display their objective resources (e.g., educational attainment, family wealth/income, and occupational prestige) through class-related signals (e.g., symbols of wealth, education, or occupation, aesthetic preferences, and social behavior). Through these class-related signals, individuals provide the information needed to compare their own social class to that of others. These comparisons then separate people into different social class categories which become the basis for individual's subjective understanding of their social class rank vis-à-vis others and lead to different psychological and behavioral outcomes for low versus high social class individuals.

=== Conceptions of self ===
Supporting the idea that social class is a cultural identity, beyond differences in structural resources and individual skills, people from lower social class backgrounds also experience cultural barriers that maintain social-class disparities. In the United States, different social class contexts foster different cultural models of self. Due to fewer financial resources, greater environmental constraints, and fewer opportunities for choice, working-class or low social class contexts tend to foster an interdependent model of self. To effectively navigate these contexts, low-social class individuals must rely on and work together with others for material assistance and support. In contrast, middle-class or higher-social class contexts provide greater access to economic capital and more opportunities for choice, fostering an independent model of self. To be effective in these contexts they must learn to influence others, challenge the status quo, and express their own personal interests.

In addition to shaping cultural models of self, socioeconomic status (SES) also influences self-concept stability. Research has shown that lower-SES individuals tend to adapt to situational demands and have more context-dependent self-concepts, while higher-SES individuals experience greater autonomy forming a more stable self-concept that remains consistent across different contexts. This stability has been linked to higher well-being through observed greater life satisfaction and lower anxiety.

Although both models of self can be highly useful, U.S. gateway institutions (e.g. higher education) tend to prioritize independence as the cultural ideal. In higher education, arguably one of the most important gateways to social mobility, administrators and educators often enact an independent model of self when making assumptions about how students should be motivated, learn, and interact with others. Students are expected to express their personal preferences, pave their own paths, and challenge norms and rules. Research suggests that when people from working class backgrounds enter institutions that prioritize independence, they face a cultural mismatch. Experiencing cultural mismatch can lead people from working class backgrounds to feel uncomfortable enacting the independent behaviors required to gain access to gateway institutions. For example, students from working class backgrounds are unlikely to apply to selective universities, feel uncomfortable separating themselves from their families and communities, and are more reluctant to pursue paths to organizational power when doing so requires self-interested behavior. Even when these students do gain admission to these institutions, the cultural mismatch that they face can impede on their opportunity to succeed. When individuals' cultural norms are not included in institutions, they feel uncomfortable and less often perform up to their potential. Additionally, displaying interdependent behaviors such as humility, instead of independent behaviors such as confidence, leads to more negative performance evaluations.

=== Relating to others ===
Conceptions of self also elicit class-specific ways of relating to others. The interdependent norms of low social class contexts tend to engender greater social responsiveness which leads people from lower social class backgrounds to more accurately understand others' emotions and to engage in more pro-social behavior. For example, higher class individuals tend to demonstrate more signs of disengagement and fewer signs of engagement than their lower class counterparts during interactions with strangers (CITE Kraus & Keltner, 2009). Lower social class individuals also tend to perceive people's emotions more accurately because they pay greater attention to contextual cues. Further, people with lower household incomes tend to donate a higher proportion of their salary to charities than do those from higher income households and are more likely to behave pro-socially toward others. Research further suggests that compared to higher social class individuals, lower social class individuals have more egalitarian values, are more likely to help a stranger in distress, and trust others more. Conversely, people who are perceived as being of lower social class are less likely to receive help from others compared to those perceived as being of higher social class.

== Relationship to other constructs ==
=== Power and status ===
Recent research has sought to distinguish social class from other dimensions of hierarchy, such as power, or a "person's relative control over resources and ability to influence others, and status, or "one's level of respect and admiration from others." Although interrelated, empirical evidence suggests that social class, measured both objectively and subjectively, is not reducible to power or status and that the correlations between social class and power and status are small to moderate.

Piff et al. (2012) found that upper-class individuals engage in more unethical behavior than lower-class individuals for a number of reasons. Factors such as their relative independence from others, increased privacy, fewer structural constraints, more resources to successfully deal with the potential fallout, and feelings of entitlement may all contribute to the findings that higher class is correlated with higher rates of wrongdoing.

=== Social class and mental health ===
Social class can have a significant impact on mental health. It is generally accepted that there is a higher concentration of mental illnesses among those from lower social classes. Many suggest that this is due to increased stressors of living in a lower class. Examples of these stressors include an unstable place of residence, food insecurity, lack of access to important resources, debt, etc. Economic inequality can directly affect the quality of care patients receive as well as the accessibility of the care. The economic inequality individuals face causes these issues in many ways including, inability to afford to travel to a mental health clinic, work hours overlapping with clinic hours, etc. More in depth information on this topic can be found at socioeconomic_status_and_mental_health#external_link .

=== Race, ethnicity, and gender ===
Social class has been related to other status-based social categories that also effect conceptions of self and how individuals relate to others. For example, similar to being low social class, being female (compared to being male) tends to promote more interdependent norms for relating to others and lower status racial minorities (i.e., African Americans) tend to exhibit more relational norms compared to racial majority members (i.e., European-Americans). Class, race, and gender also have similar effects on individuals sense of belonging in academic institutions. Students from lower social class backgrounds tend to experience increased anxiety about confirming to negative stereotypes about their social class when a test is framed as diagnostic of ability, and inevitably perform worse as a result. This parallels research on the role of stereotype threat in the performance of racial minorities and women in academic settings.

Further, social class is largely intertwined with the mental representations of other categories of identity (i.e., race). For example, Black people are often stereotyped as unintelligent, lazy, and dishonest, while White people are stereotyped as intelligent, motivated, and productive. A further analysis of identity-based stereotypes reveals a direct overlap between the stereotypes associated with being Black and being poor (e.g., unintelligent), and those associated with being White and being rich (e.g., competent). These stereotypes play a pivotal role in how people interpret and categorize individuals. For example, observers are more like to categorize an ambiguously raced person as Black when the individual is wearing low-status clothing and as White when the individual is wearing high-status clothing. Additionally, mental representations of low social class people tend to be of Black people, whereas mental representations of high social class people tend to be of White people.

== See also ==
- Class consciousness
- Social psychology
- Social class
- Social inequality
