= Judith Harackiewicz =

American social psychologist

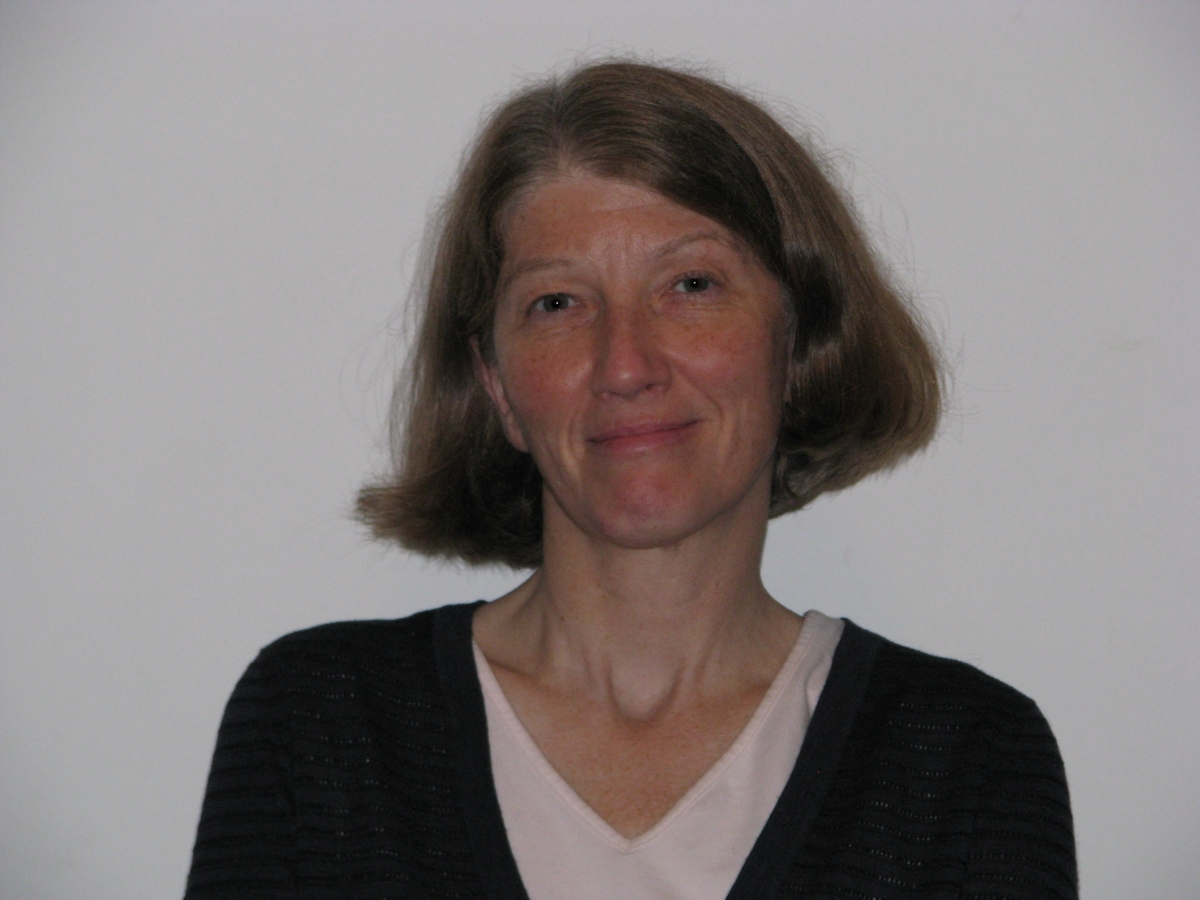

Judith Harackiewicz is an American social psychologist, focused on the role of motivation at the intersection of social and educational psychology. Harackiewicz is currently the Paul Pintrich Professor of Psychology at the University of Wisconsin–Madison, however in addition to this role she has also made numerous contributions to social psychology.

== Career ==
Her work is unique in that it investigates motivation in real-life situations while using motivational principles discovered in laboratory situations. Notable studies employ psychological concepts and findings in hopes of improving the American educational system. Also, her research is often centered on intrinsic motivation, sometimes studied over long periods of time to track change. Another goal of Harackiewicz is to research, improve, and revise the Achievement Goal Theory. Overall, the key aspect of her study is theoretical synthesis, meaning that her combined findings between the laboratory and survey research are mainly executed to question pre-existing motivational psychology theories. Harackiewicz has been recognized for her achievements with the 2013 Cialdini Award from the Society for Personality and Social Psychology.

Many of the studies Harackiewicz is involved in aim to change the modern educational system in discovering new ways to promote positive academic interest and performance among students. She often uses intervention-based research tactics in attempts to challenge the Achievement Goal Theory, and suggest new strategies to promote success among students. Examples of these approaches can be seen in the selected research section.

She graduated from Harvard University with a PhD in 1980.

== Selected research ==
=== Hulleman, C. S., & Harackiewicz, J. M. (2009) ===
"Promoting interest and performance in high school science classes" was published in 2009. The study aimed to investigate the effect of relevance interventions on academic success and interest. Hulleman and Harackiewicz conducted a randomized field experiment, with 262 9th grade participants. Students were either asked to write about the relevance of the science course to their future endeavors, or a summary of the course material. The participants' success expectancies and original interest were recorded at the beginning of the experiment, then re-assessed at the end of the semester. It was found that those who reflected on the relevance of the course and who had originally low expectations for success, displayed a significant growth in interest and performance in the class. These results suggest that the practice of enforcing relevance interventions could be very beneficial to high school students, particularly those with low expectations. This research presents high school teachers with a scientifically proven way to increase interest and performance among their students.

=== Harackiewicz, J.M., Canning, E.A., Tibbetts, Y., Giffen, C.J., Blair, S.S., Rouse, D.I., & Hyde, J.S. (2014) ===
"Closing the social class achievement gap for first-generation students in undergraduate biology" was published in 2014. The researchers investigated how the use of value affirmation interventions effect the achievement of first-generation students studying biosciences. First-generation students account for a fifth of all college students, and many of these students were found to abandon their original goals due to struggles and discouragement in introductory classes. Harackiewicz et al. reported a values affirmation intervention with 798 college students, 154 of which were first-generation enrolled in one of the first biology courses required for their major. Value interventions were then conducted by the researchers with all participants, which included asking the participants questions about positive aspects, aspirations, and beliefs in their lives. After tracking their achievement through grades, it was found that course scores, material retention, and overall GPA for the semester improved among first-generation students as a result of the intervention. This intervention closed the academic gap between first-generation and continuing generation students by 50% and increased retention by 20%. This study is extremely significant in educational psychology because the researchers suggest that psychological interventions can increase academic achievement among first-generation students in the biosciences.

=== Canning, E. A., & Harackiewicz, J. M. (2015) ===
"Teach it, don’t preach it: The differential effects of directly-communicated and self-generated utility–value information" was published in 2015. This study aimed to investigate how the medium of utility value information given effects a students academic performance and interest. This research included 3 laboratory studies which varied whether student participants were directly told the purpose and value of a mental math technique, or independently formed ideas about the purpose and value of a mental math technique. The first study found that externally produced utility-value information negatively affected the performance of interest of students lacking confidence, and that internally produced utility-value information had positive effects. The second study then found that the negative effects of externally produced utility-value information can then be cancelled out if the student later internally produces such conclusions. Finally, the third study revealed that the most helpful forms of utility-value information relate to everyday situations, as opposed to career and educational examples. This research provides much helpful insight to educators about how to promote academic excellence among students. The findings suggest that student should be self-generating utility-value information, as opposed to receiving this information externally. Also, that everyday examples of the utility of a course can also promote positive change in a student's academic performance and interest.
