= Common ingroup identity =

Model that outlines the processes through which intergroup bias may be reduced

The common ingroup identity model is a theoretical model proposed by Samuel L. Gaertner and John F. Dovidio that outlines the processes through which intergroup bias may be reduced. Intergroup bias is a preference for one's in-group over the out-group. Derived from the social identity approach to intergroup behaviour, the common ingroup identity model is rooted in the process of social categorization, or how people conceive of group boundaries. The model describes how intergroup bias can be reduced if members of different groups can be induced to conceive of themselves to be part of the same group, then they would develop more positive attitudes of the former outgroup members. An individual will change the way they view the out-group through a social categorization process called recategorization where former out-group members become incorporated into individual's representations of the in-group.

== Development of the model ==
Although, social categorization usually occurs spontaneously on the basis of proximity, similarities, or even shared fate, it is not completely uncontrollable or unalterable. The common ingroup identity group model harnesses the forces of how we categorize ourselves into social groups and redirects it towards the elimination of intergroup bias with recategorization. Recategorization encourages the members of both groups to consider themselves as belonging to a common superordinate group. Furthermore, recategorization does not require an individual to reject their original subgroup identity in favor of the new inclusive group identity. Rather, a dual identity may be present, whereby individuals view themselves as members of different groups working towards the same goals.

According to the model, different types of intergroup interdependence and cognitive, perceptual, affective, linguistic, and environmental factors, can either independently or in concert, alter individual's cognitive representations of the aggregate. In essence, these factors may indirectly reduce intergroup bias by facilitating a transformation of members' perceptions of group boundaries from 'us' and 'them' to a more inclusive 'we'. Furthermore, a common ingroup identity can be directly attained by increasing the salience of existing common superordinate memberships (e.g. a team, a school, a company, a nation) or categories (e.g. students) or by introducing factors that are shared by the memberships (i.e. common goals or fate). From this view, features specified by Allport's (1954) contact hypothesis, such as cooperative interaction, equal status and egalitarian norms, reduce intergroup bias by providing an environment which assists in transforming individual's perceptions of group boundaries from two groups to one more inclusive group.

== Research ==
A large body of research in meaningful 'real-world' contexts lends support to the applicability of the common ingroup identity model. In a diverse range of intergroup situations, it has been demonstrated that the conditions specified by the contact hypothesis (i.e. cooperative interaction) reduce intergroup bias through transforming members' representations of separate group memberships to one inclusive group. These findings have been demonstrated among diverse groups including students attending a multiethnic high school, banking executives who had experienced a corporate merger, and in recently formed stepfamilies. Furthermore, studies have demonstrated that individuals express more positive attitudes towards racial outgroups when a common, superordinate identity is made salient. In a field experiment conducted at the University of Delaware football stadium, interviewers (either White or Black) approached White football fans wearing either a home team hat (the common ingroup identity condition) or an away team hat (the control condition). Football fans complied with Black interviewers more when the interviewer was wearing the home team hat, suggesting that (Black) outgroup members were treated more favourably when they were perceived to share a more inclusive common ingroup identity.

Early studies of the common ingroup identity model conducted by Gaertner and Dovidio analyzed how the degree of differentiation between groups influences representation of groups and intergroup attitudes. In one study, the effect of physical seating arrangements to the degree which two groups perceive themselves as one unit was examined. Two groups of four participants (AAAA and BBBB) met in separate rooms to discuss a solution to a problem and then convened around an octagonal table as one group. The seating arrangements were configured in a segregated (AAAABBBB), partially integrated (AABABBAB), or fully integrated pattern (ABABABAB). Results indicated that participants who experienced greater integrated seating experienced the merger as one unit and exhibited less ingroup bias. Similarly, relative value of members' contribution to the solution, ratings of friendliness between and within subgroups, and confidence in the merged group's solution increased with greater seat integration. Participants who regarded the aggregate group as one entity perceived the group as more cooperative, democratic, pleasant, close, and successful than participants who viewed the aggregate group as two units. These results suggest manipulation of seating arrangements changes group representations and influenced group bias.

== Criticism ==
Criticism for the common ingroup identity model primarily questions the long term effectiveness of the approach proposed in the model. The potential of a common ingroup identity to facilitate helping naturalistic groups with history of conflict was tested at a University football game. In this experiment, salient superordinate and subgroup identities were demonstrated to increase behavioral compliance with request for assistance from a person of different race, as explained above. However, the reduction in bias is only shown to occur for a temporary period of time.

In a laboratory experiment, racial outgroup members sharing common superordinate identity was explored. The results demonstrate that evaluations of the White partner were equivalent for the team and individual conditions. However, the evaluations of the Black partner were significantly more positive in the team condition than the individual condition. Additionally, the evaluation of the Black partner in the team condition was even more favorable than the evaluation of the White partner. These results indicate racial outgroup members sharing common identity were treated particularly positively relative to other conditions, but does not demonstrate how long the common identity is kept.

== Applications ==
Educational exposure has been shown to decrease social dominance orientation and symbolic racism. Increased levels of educational exposure have been shown to lead to decreased levels of group dominance orientation among different university majors and to decreased levels of blatant and subtle ethnic prejudice. Because students see themselves as part of a superordinate group, other issues of sub group differences are attenuated.

Intergroup bias can be manifested as either traditional racism or aversive racism. For example, following the events of Hurricane Katrina in 2005, a great deal of controversy arose over the event and how relief was handled. On one hand, Blacks felt that relief was slow to come due to racism. A poll revealed that 60% of Blacks felt that relief was slow to come because the majority of New Orleans inhabitants and those affected were Black. On the other hand, Whites felt that the residents of New Orleans were to blame. In the same poll as mentioned above, only 12% of Whites felt that relief was slow to come because the victims were mainly Black. In a study conducted by Gruschow and Hong, recategorization was shown to change perceptions of prejudice towards the Black out-group. When Whites identified themselves as "American", they were more prone to blame the victims of Hurricane Katrina for their predicament. When they identified themselves as "White American" or "European American", they were less likely to blame the victims. For a majority of White Americans, the title "American" isn't perceived as an inclusive title for all Americans (of which, minorities are surely included). By providing a dual identity in the "White/European American" identification, White Americans were able to view themselves as part of two groups, one of which, American (to include all Americans) was superordinate. Thus, intergroup bias was reduced by the recategorization of White Americans into the superordinate American group.

For many Americans, the terrorist attacks of September 11, 2001 served as a unifying experience. As the attacks came from outside the country, a salient out-group was created. Additionally, recategorization for a majority of Americans occurred in that they felt America as a whole was attacked; the attacks increased the salience of the perception that all Americans are members of a superordinate nation group. Thus, through recategorization, America as a whole became the new in-group and a different out-group was created. "In-group favoritism strengthened group cohesion, feelings of solidarity, and identification with the most emblematic values of the U.S. nation, while outgroup discrimination induced U.S. citizens to conceive the enemy (al-Qaeda and its protectors) as the incarnation of evil, depersonalizing the group and venting their anger on it, and to give their backing to a military response, the eventual intervention in Afghanistan".

Recently, a study has shown that common in-group identity may have the potential to ease tense relations between religious groups. Muslims and Christians who identified with the common group of Abrahamic religions were more favorable towards the respective out-group.

== See also ==
- Discrimination
- Out-group homogeneity
- Stereotyping
