= Gordon Allport =

American psychologist (1897–1967)

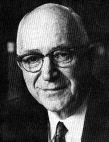
- Born: Gordon William Allport; November 11, 1897; Montezuma, Indiana, US
- Died: October 9, 1967 (aged 69); Cambridge, Massachusetts, US
- Education: Harvard University
- Known for: Personality psychology
- Scientific career
- Fields: Psychology
- Workplaces: Dartmouth College; Harvard University; Robert College
- Thesis: An experimental study of the traits of personality (1922)

Gordon William Allport (November 11, 1897 – October 9, 1967) was an American psychologist. Allport was one of the first psychologists to focus on the study of the personality, and is often referred to as one of the founding figures of personality psychology. He contributed to the formation of values scales and rejected both a psychoanalytic approach to personality, which he thought often was too deeply interpretive, and a behavioral approach, which he thought did not provide deep enough interpretations from their data. Instead of these popular approaches, he developed an eclectic theory based on traits. He emphasized the uniqueness of each individual and the importance of the present context, as opposed to history, for understanding the personality.

Allport had a profound and lasting influence on the field of psychology. Part of his influence stemmed from his knack for exploring and broadly conceptualizing important topics (e.g., rumor, prejudice, religion, traits). Another part of his influence resulted from the deep and lasting impression he made on his students during his long teaching career, many of whom went on to have important careers in psychology.

Among his many students at Harvard University were Jerome S. Bruner, Anthony Greenwald, Stanley Milgram, Leo Postman, Thomas Pettigrew, and M. Brewster Smith. His brother, Floyd Henry Allport, was professor of social psychology and political psychology at Syracuse University's Maxwell School of Citizenship and Public Affairs (in Syracuse, New York) from 1924 until 1956, and visiting professor at University of California, Berkeley. A Review of General Psychology survey, published in 2002, ranked Allport as the 11th most-cited psychologist of the 20th century.

== Biography ==
Allport grew up in a religious family of Christian missionaries. He was born in Montezuma, Indiana, and was the youngest of four sons of John Edward and Nellie Edith (Wise) Allport. When Gordon Allport was six years old, the family had already moved many times and finally settled in Ohio. His early education was in the public schools of Cleveland, Ohio.

John Allport was a country doctor and had his clinic and hospital in the family home. Allport's father turned their home into a makeshift hospital, with patients as well as nurses residing there. Gordon Allport and his brothers grew up surrounded by their father's patients, nurses, and medical equipment, and he and his brothers often assisted their father in the clinic. Allport reported that "Tending office, washing bottles, and dealing with patients were important aspects of my early training" (p. 172). During this time, Allport's father was encapsulated in a blurb in Samuel Hopkins Adams' exposé in Collier's Magazine on fraudulent medicinal cures, later reprinted as the book The Great American Fraud: Articles on the Nostrum Evil and Quackery. While much of the book focuses on large scale, heavily advertised patent medicines available at the turn of the century, the author states Allport "would never have embodied this article were it not for the efforts of certain physicians of Cleveland." Allport was criticized for diagnosing and treating morphine addicts via mail simply on the basis of letters and no in-person appointments. Upon receiving Adams' letter detailing his concocted affliction, Allport replied back via mail, diagnosing Adams as a morphine addict and sending doses of the "Dr. J. Edward Allport System," designed to cure morphine addicts. Analysis of the medicine revealed its active ingredient to be nothing more than additional morphine, packed with a bottle of pink whiskey "to mix with the morphin[sp] when it gets low." Adams referred to Allport as a "[quack] who pretend[s] to be a physician," is "no less scoundrelly," and "is even more dangerous" than other fraudulent addiction cure peddlers mentioned earlier in the book.

Allport's mother was a former school teacher, who forcefully promoted her values of intellectual development and religion.

Biographers describe Allport as a reserved and diligent young boy who lived a fairly isolated childhood. As a teenager, Allport developed and managed his own printing business on the side while serving as an editor of his high school newspaper. In 1915, he graduated second in his class at Glenville High School at the age of eighteen, which earned him a scholarship that allowed him to attend Harvard University. One of his older brothers, Floyd Henry Allport, was working on his Ph.D. in psychology at Harvard.

Allport earned his A.B. degree in 1919 in Philosophy and Economics (not psychology). The following year, he traved to Europe and visited Sigmund Freud in Vienna. He did graduate work at the University of Berlin and the University of Hamburg before traveling to Robert College in Istanbul, Turkey, to teach. He then returned to Harvard to become an instructor in social ethics before studying psychology on a fellowship in 1920. His first publication, Personality Traits: Their Classification and Measurement in 1921, was co-authored with his older brother, Floyd Henry Allport. Allport earned his master's degree in 1921, studying under Herbert Langfeld, and then his Ph.D. in 1922, along the way taking a class with Hugo Münsterberg before the latter's death in 1916.

Harvard then awarded Allport a Sheldon Traveling Fellowship. He spent the first Sheldon year studying with the new Gestalt School in Berlin and Hamburg, Germany; and then the second year at Cambridge University.

In 1921 through 1937, Allport helped establish personality as a psychological research type within American psychology. He returned to Harvard as an instructor in psychology from 1924 to 1926 where he began teaching his course "Personality: Its Psychological and Social Aspects" in 1924. During this time, Allport married Ada Lufkin Gould, who was a clinical psychologist. Together they had one child, a boy, who later became a pediatrician. After going to teach introductory courses on social psychology and personality at Dartmouth College for four years (1926 to 1930), Allport returned to Harvard and remained there for the rest of his career.

Allport was a member of the faculty at Harvard University from 1930 to 1967. In 1931, he served on the faculty committee that established Harvard's Sociology Department. In the late 1940s, he helped to develop an introductory course for the new Social Relations Department. At that time, he was also editor of the Journal of Abnormal and Social Psychology. Allport was also a Director of the Commission for the United Nations Educational Scientific, and Cultural Organization. He was elected a Fellow of the American Academy of Arts and Sciences in 1933.

By 1937, Allport began to act as a spokesman for personality psychology. He appeared on radio talk shows and wrote literature reviews, articles, and a textbook. He was elected President of the American Psychological Association (APA) in 1939, being the second youngest person to hold that office. In 1941, he served on the board of directors of the newly formed National Opinion Research Center at the University of Denver. In 1943, he was elected President of the Eastern Psychological Association (EPA). In 1944, he served as President of the Society for the Psychological Study of Social Issues. In 1950, Allport published his third book titled The Individual and His Religion. His fourth book, The Nature of Prejudice, was published in 1954, based on his work with refugees during World War II. His fifth book, published in 1955, was titled Becoming: Basic Considerations for Psychology of Personality. In 1963, Allport was awarded the Gold Medal Award from the American Psychological Foundation. In the following year, he received the APA's Distinguished Scientific Contribution Award. He was also made an honorary member of the British Psychological Society and similar groups in Austria, France, and Germany. Gordon Allport died on October 9, 1967, at the Stillman Infirmary of Harvard University in Cambridge, Massachusetts, of lung cancer, just one month shy of his 70th birthday.

== Allport's trait theory ==
Allport contributed to the trait theory of personality, and is known as a "trait" psychologist. He opposed the idea that people can be classified according to a small number of trait dimensions, arguing that each person is unique and distinguished by particular traits. In his work, Concepts of Trait and Personality (1927), Allport states that traits are "habits possessed of social significance" and become very predictable. Traits are a unit of personality. Allport emphasized that an individual's personality is the single most unique thing about a person.

One of his early projects was to go through the dictionary and locate every term that he thought could describe a person. From this, he developed a list of 4,500 trait-like words. He organized these words into three levels of traits. This is similar to Goldberg's fundamental lexical hypothesis, or the hypothesis that humans develop widely used, generic terms for individual differences in their daily interactions over time.

Allport's three-level hierarchy of traits are:

1. Cardinal trait - These traits are rare but can dominate and shape a person's behavior. They exert a powerful influence on behavior, which becomes aspects of a person's identity. These are the ruling passions/obsessions, such as a need for money, fame, etc.

2. Central trait - These traits are general characteristics found in some degree in every person. These are the basic building blocks that shape most of our behavior; although, they are not as overwhelming as cardinal traits. They influence but do not determine behavior. An example of a central trait would be honesty.

3. Secondary trait - These traits are the bottom tier of the hierarchy and are not as apparent as central traits (less influential). Secondary traits are characteristics seen only in certain circumstances (such as particular likes or dislikes that a very close friend may know). They must be included to provide a complete picture of human complexity.

Overall, Allport's three-level hierarchy of traits provides a framework for understanding the different levels of traits that collectively shape an individual's personality.

== The Development of the Proprium ==
Through Allport's humanist trait models, he posited that personalities are dynamic, evolve throughout people's lives, and are driven by motivations that may differ significantly as people age.

1. Sense of bodily "me" (first year) - Infants perceive themselves through sensations to understand what makes them up and what does not.

2. Sense of self-identity (second year) - They understand themselves by the significance of their name. This can then give them a sense of how they are and what that can mean socially.

3. Sense of self-esteem (third year) - With having a sense of who they are in this stage, they want to have a form of independence that can be stepped away from adult supervision.

4. Sense of self-extension (fourth year) - In this stage, the child can see their body and extend to toys. The words that seem to be stated in their mind is "mine".

5. Emergence of self-image (fourth to sixth year) - There seems to be an awareness of the good me and the bad me for the children that can bring up what they expect others to expect from them. In this stage, certain goals they see for themselves are brought up.

6. Emergence of self as a rational coper (sixth to twelfth year) - At this stage, it is brought to the awareness that thoughts can help solve problems in which they tend to think a lot about their thinking.

7. Emergence of proproate striving (twelfth year through adolescence) - In this stage, it is believed that future goals are built to give a sense of meaning to one's life. Allport viewed a healthy person to create problems by making future goals that can be seen as unattainable in many cases. This sense of creating these long-term goals is set to differentiate from other stages and even from having a healthy or sick personality.

8. Emergence of self as knower (adulthood) - In this final stage, the self is seen as a knower who can be aware of and surpass the seven other propriate functions. When gone through all stages, you appear to use several or even all in daily tasks and experiences

== Functional autonomy of motives ==
Allport was one of the first researchers to draw a distinction between Motive and Drive. He suggested that a drive forms as a reaction to a motive, which may outgrow the motive as the reason for a behavior. The drive then becomes autonomous and distinct from the motive, whether the motive was instinct or something else. The idea that drives can become independent of the original motives for a given behavior is known as "functional autonomy."

Allport gives the example of a man who seeks to perfect his task or craft. His original motive may be a sense of inferiority engrained in his childhood, but his diligence in his work and the motive it acquires, later on, is a need to excel in his chosen profession, which becomes the man's drive. Allport says that the theory:

"... avoids the absurdity of regarding the energy of life now, in the present, as somehow consisting of early archaic forms (instincts, prepotent reflexes, or the never-changing Id). Learning brings new systems of interests into existence just as it does new abilities and skills. At each stage of development, these interests are always contemporary; whatever drives, drives now."

== Bibliography ==
- Concepts of Trait and Personality. Psychological Bulletin, 24(5-1927), pp. 284–293
- Studies in expressive movement (with Vernon, P. E.) (1933) New York: Macmillan Publishers.
- Attitudes, in A Handbook of Social Psychology, ed. C. Murchison, (1935). Worcester, MA: Clark University Press, 789–844.
- Personality: A psychological interpretation. (1937) New York: Holt, Rinehart, & Winston.
- The Psychologist's Frame of Reference (1940). Classics in the History of Psychology -- Allport (1940)
- The Psychology of Rumor [with Leo Postman] (1947). New York: Henry Holt & Company
- The Individual and His Religion: A Psychological Interpretation. Oxford, England: Macmillan, 1950.
- The Nature of Personality: Selected Papers. (1950; 1975). Westport, CN : Greenwood Press. ISBN 0-8371-7432-5
- The Nature of Prejudice. (1954; 1979). Reading, MA : Addison-Wesley Pub. Co. ISBN 0-201-00178-0
- Becoming: Basic Considerations for a Psychology of Personality. (1955). New Haven: Yale University Press. ISBN 0-300-00264-5
- Personality & social encounter. (1960). Boston: Beacon Press.
- Pattern and Growth in Personality. (1961). Harcourt College Pub. ISBN 0-03-010810-1
- Letters from Jenny. (1965) New York: Harcourt, Brace & World
- The Person in Psychology (1968). Boston: Beacon Press.

== See also ==
- Allport's Scale - a measure of the manifestation of prejudice in a society devised by Gordon Allport in 1954.
- List of science and religion scholars
- Contact hypothesis
- Labels of Primary Potency
