= Thomas F. Pettigrew =

American professor of social psychology

- Born: 14 March 1931 (age 95); Richmond, Virginia
- Spouse: Ann Hallman
- Awards: Cooley-Mead Award, 2014;

Academic background
- Education: University of Virginia B.A. (psychology); Harvard University M.A., PhD. (social psychology)
- Influences: Gordon Allport, Samuel A. Stouffer, Talcott Parsons.

Academic work
- Discipline: Social psychology
- Institutions: University of California, Santa Cruz
- Main interests: Social psychological and structural factors in intergroup relations; racial prejudice; meta-analyses of intergroup contact and relative deprivation research.
- Website: https://pettigrew.socialpsychology.org/

Thomas Fraser Pettigrew (born March 14, 1931) is an American social psychologist best known for his research on American civil rights, and is one of the leading experts in the social science of race and ethnic relations.

== Early life ==
Pettigrew was born in Richmond, Virginia in 1931 during a period of racial segregation and intense prejudice in the American South. As a youth, Pettigrew witnessed racial injustice first hand, such as a formative experience when he was accompanying his African American caregiver, Mildred Adams to movie starring Humphrey Bogart, her favorite actor.

She was barred from entry due to a "whites only" rule, and repetitions of such experiences produced in Pettigrew an intense abhorrence of racial discrimination and intolerance, strongly motivating his passion for research into racial prejudice.

== Career ==
Pettigrew received his bachelor's degree in psychology from University of Virginia, and his M.A., PhD. in social psychology from Harvard University where Gordon Allport and Samuel A. Stouffer were his mentors. He received his PhD in 1956.

== Personal life ==
In 1956, Pettigrew married physician Ann Hallman Pettigrew who at the time was a pre-med student at Harvard University. They had one child, Mark Fraser Pettigrew born in 1966. Pettigrew taught at Harvard for 23 years and in 1980 became a research professor at the University of California, Santa Cruz.

== Research ==
Pettigrew's initial research showed that psychological factors such as orientation towards authoritarianism could not alone account for greater hostility towards Black Americans in the South. Further structural components and societal norms he argued had to be considered for a more complete description of the phenomenon, an approach he later referred to as his multilevel approach to social issues using several levels of analysis. The case of prejudice for example requires:

1. The micro level of analysis considering attitudes, cognitions and personality dynamics of individuals.
2. The macro level – including a society's structural aspects such as norms, and mores.
3. The meso level – where "the immediate situation of social interaction plays a key role.

Pettigrew has studied each level and its interactions with others throughout his career, such as the role authoritarianism plays with prejudice, subtle individual prejudicial attitudes affect the undermining of desegregation, or friendship plays in his reformulation of intergroup conflict and contact theory. Pettigrew continues to argue forcefully that no level alone is sufficient for adequate analysis.

== Books and Monographs ==
- Campbell, E. Q., & Pettigrew, T. F. Christians in racial crisis: A study of the Little Rock ministry. Washington, DC: Public Affairs Press, 1959.
- Pettigrew, T. F. Epitaph for Jim Crow. New York: Anti-Defamation League, 1963.
- Pettigrew, T. F. A profile of the Negro American. New York: Van Nostrand, 1964.
  - Reprinted in Norwegian as: Den Amerikanske Neger. Oslo: Pax Forlag, 1966. Also reprinted in Japan, 1968.
- Watts, L. G., Freeman, H. E., Hughes, H. R., Morris, R., & Pettigrew, T. F. The middle-income Negro family faces urban renewal. Boston: Massachusetts Dept. of Commerce and Development, 1964.
  - Reprinted in part in: J. R. Feagin (Ed.), The urban scene: Myths and realities. pp. 201–212. New York: Random House, 1972.
- Pettigrew, T. F. (with the staff of the U.S. Commission on Civil Rights) Racial isolation in the public schools. Vols. I & II. Washington, DC: U.S. Government Printing Office, 1967.
- Pettigrew, T. F. A study of school integration. Final Report of Cooperative Research Project No. 6-1774 of the United States Office of Education, August 1970.
- Franklin, J. H., Pettigrew, T. F., & Mack, R. W. Ethnicity in American life. New York: Anti-Defamation League, 1971. Reprinted in part in:
  - O. Feinstein (Ed.), Ethnic groups in the city. Lexington, MA: Lexington Books, 1971, pp. 29–37; A. Deshefsky (Ed.),
  - Ethnic peoples and identity. Chicago: Rand McNally, 1975, pp. 13–23;
  - R. J. Meister (Ed.), Race and ethnicity in modern America. Lexington, MA: Heath, 1974, pp. 179–189.
- Pettigrew, T. F. Racially separate or together? New York: McGraw-Hill, 1971.
  - Reprinted in part in: L. Rainwater (Ed.), Inequality and justice. pp. 216–224. Chicago: Aldine, 1974.
- Pettigrew, T. F. Why people hate. Taped presentation prepared and distributed by Mass Communications, Inc., Westport, CN, 1974.
- Pettigrew, T. F. (Ed.) Racial discrimination in the United States. New York: Harper & Row, 1975.
- Pettigrew, T. F. (Ed.) The sociology of race relations: Reflection and reform. New York: Free Press, 1980.
- Fredrickson, G. M., Knobel, D. T., Glazer, N., Pettigrew, T. F., & Ueda, R. Prejudice. Cambridge, MA: Harvard University Press, 1982.
  - Reprinted in Japanese: Prejudice. Tokyo: Tuttle-Mori, 1982.
- Archer, D., Aronson, E., & Pettigrew, T. F. An evaluation of the energy conservation programs and research of California's major utility companies, 1977–1980. San Francisco, CA: California Public Utilities Commission, 1983.
- Pettigrew, T. F., & Alston, D. Tom Bradley's campaigns for governor: The dilemma of race and political strategies. Washington, DC: The Joint Center for Political Studies, 1988.
- Pettigrew, T. F., Coltrane, S., Archer, D., & M. Lucia. Assessing and minimizing bias in the residential appliance saturation surveys. Berkeley, CA: Universitywide Energy Research Group, University of California, 1988.
- Stephan, C. W., Stephan, W. G., & Pettigrew, T. F. The future of social psychology: Defining the relationship between sociology and psychology. New York: Springer Verlag, 1991.
- Pettigrew, T. F. How to think like a social scientist. New York: HarperCollins, 1996.
  - Reprinted in part in: McBearty, S., & Brown, S. Very short guide to writing in anthropology. New York: Oxford University Press, 2014
- Pettigrew, T. F., & Tropp, L. When groups meet: The dynamics of intergroup contact. New York, NY: Psychology Press, 2011.
