= Misandry =

Prejudice against, or hatred of, men

Misandry (/mɪsˈændri/) is the hatred of or prejudice against men or boys.

The term misandry originated in the late 19th century as an epithet for first-wave feminism, drawing an equivalence between hatred of men and misogyny, the hatred of women. The term re-emerged during the 1980s in men's rights literature and academic literature on structural sexism. In the internet age, use of the term has become common within the manosphere to counter feminist accusations of misogyny as part of an antifeminist backlash.

Users of men's rights discussion forums on websites such as 4chan and Reddit have claimed that misandry is widespread, established in preferential treatment of women, and shown by discrimination against men. Men's rights activists (MRAs) and other masculinist groups have characterized modern laws concerning divorce, domestic violence, conscription, circumcision, and treatment of male rape victims as examples of institutional misandry. However, in virtually all societies, misandry lacks institutional and systemic support comparable to misogyny.

== Etymology and usage ==
"Misandry" is formed from the Greek misos (μῖσος 'hatred') and anēr, andros (ἀνήρ, gen. ἀνδρός 'man'). The equivalent German term, Misandrie, which has a similar Greek derivation, appeared in 1803 as an entry in the Prussian encyclopedia, Oeconomische Encyclopädie. A "misandrist" is a person who hates men. "Misandrous" or "misandrist" can also be used as adjectives. Use of "misandrist" can be found as far back as an 1871 article in The Spectator magazine.

== History ==
The term misandry originated in the late 19th century. According to information policy scholars Alice Marwick and Robyn Caplan, the term was used as a synonym for feminism from its inception, drawing an equivalence between misandry ('man-hating') and misogyny ('woman-hating'). Newspapers in the 1890s occasionally referred to feminist "new women" as "man haters", and a 1928 article in Harper's Monthly said that misandry "distorts the more querulous of [modern] feminist arguments." The term re-emerged in men's rights literature and academic literature on structural sexism in the 1980s. It was in use on Usenet since at least 1989, and on websites and blogs dedicated to men's rights issues in the late 1990s and early 2000s.

Anthropologist David D. Gilmore coined the term "viriphobia" in 1997, when the term "misandry" was little used and there was no commonly accepted term for hatred of men. He writes that such terms as "misandry" typically refer not to hatred of men as men, but to hatred of machismo or men's traditional gender role. He argues that misandry is therefore not equivalent to misogyny, which "targets women no matter what they believe or do". Gilmore says that hatred of men as men is extremely rare in historical records, in sharp contrast to misogyny, which he argues is a "near-universal phenomenon".

Marwick and Caplan argue that usage of the term misandry in the internet age is an outgrowth of misogyny and antifeminism. The term is commonly used in the manosphere, such as on men's rights discussion forums on websites such as 4chan and Reddit, to counter feminist accusations of misogyny. The critique and parody of the concept of misandry by feminist bloggers has been reported on in periodicals such as The Guardian, Slate and Time.

=== Use by the men's rights movement ===
Men's rights activists (MRAs) invoke the idea of misandry in warning against what they see as the advance of a female-dominated society. The idea of feminism as threatening towards men, encapsulated in the term misandry, forms a core part of the vocabulary of the manosphere and is used within the men's rights movement (MRM) to counter feminist accusations of misogyny. The idea of feminism as a misandrist movement has been cited as justification for harassment of people espousing feminist ideas, one example being the Gamergate harassment campaign against women in the video games industry. MRAs and other masculinist groups have criticized modern laws concerning divorce, domestic violence, and treatment of male rape victims as examples of institutional misandry. Other proposed examples include men's shorter lifespans, higher suicide rates, requirements to participate in military drafts, and lack of tax benefits afforded to widowers compared to widows.

Marc A. Ouellette argues in International Encyclopedia of Men and Masculinities that "misandry lacks the systemic, transhistoric, institutionalized, and legislated antipathy of misogyny"; in his view, assuming a parallel between misogyny and misandry overly simplifies relations of gender and power.

Marwick and Caplan have examined the use of the term misandry within the manosphere as a weapon against feminist language and ideas. They characterize men's rights activists' use of the term—as a gender-reversed counterpart to misogyny—as an appropriation of leftist identity politics. Marwick and Caplan also argue that coverage of the discourse of misandry by mainstream journalists serves to reinforce the MRM's framing of feminist activism as oppressive toward men, along with its denial of institutionalized sexism against women.

MRAs have been criticised for promoting a false equivalence between misandry and misogyny, as part of an antifeminist backlash. A 2023 research article, which combined multiple studies conducted by the authors, found that feminists are no more likely to be misandrist than other groups, including non-feminist men and women. The authors coined the term "The Misandry Myth" to describe the popular notion that misandry is commonplace among feminists.

== Racialization ==
Misandry can be racialized. According to some researchers in Black male studies such as Tommy J. Curry, Black men and boys face anti-Black misandry. E. C. Krell, a gender researcher, uses the term racialized transmisandry describing the experience of Black transmasculine people.

== Research ==
=== "Ambivalence toward Men Inventory" ===
Glick and Fiske developed psychometric constructs to measure the attitudes of individuals towards men in their Ambivalence toward Men Inventory, AMI, which includes a factor Hostility toward Men. These metrics were based on a small group discussion with women which identified factors, these number of questions were then reduced using statistical methods. Hostility toward Men was split into three factors: Resentment of Paternalism, the belief men supported male power; Compensatory Gender Differentiation, the belief that men were supported by women; and Heterosexual Hostility, which looked at beliefs that men were likely to engage in hostile actions. The combined construct, Hostility toward Men, was found to be inversely correlated with measures of gender equality when comparing difference countries and in a study with university students, self-describing feminists were found to have a lower score.

=== Criminal justice system ===
In the United States, men tend to receive longer sentences than women for committing the same crimes, although the disparity is more pronounced for minor offenses, and is also dependent on the race of the perpetrator. Criminologist Nathan A. Kruis of Pennsylvania State University and colleagues write that a body of research suggests the presence of "potential institutional misandry" in the U.S. criminal justice system.

== In literature ==
=== Ancient Greek literature ===
Classicist Froma Zeitlin writes:

The most significant point of contact, however, between Eteocles and the suppliant Danaids is, in fact, their extreme positions with regard to the opposite sex: the misogyny of Eteocles' outburst against all women of whatever variety has its counterpart in the seeming misandry of the Danaids, who although opposed to their Egyptian cousins in particular (marriage with them is incestuous, they are violent men) often extend their objections to include the race of males as a whole and view their cause as a passionate contest between the sexes.

=== Shakespeare ===
Literary critic Harold Bloom argued that even though the word misandry is relatively unheard of in literature, it is not hard to find implicit, even explicit, misandry. In reference to the works of Shakespeare, Bloom argued:

I cannot think of one instance of misogyny whereas I would argue that misandry is a strong element. Shakespeare makes perfectly clear that women in general have to marry down and that men are narcissistic and not to be trusted and so forth. On the whole, he gives us a darker vision of human males than human females.

=== Modern literature ===
Sociologist Anthony Synnott argues that there is a tendency in literature to represent men as villains and women as victims, and argues that there is a market for "anti-male" novels with no corresponding "anti-female" market, citing The Women's Room by Marilyn French, and The Color Purple by Alice Walker. He gives examples of comparisons of men to Nazi prison guards as a common theme in literature.

Racialized misandry occurs in both "high" and "low" culture and literature. For instance, African-American men have often been disparagingly portrayed as either infantile or as eroticized and hyper-masculine, depending on prevailing cultural stereotypes.

Julie M. Thompson, a feminist author, connects misandry with envy of men, in particular "penis envy", a term coined by Sigmund Freud in 1908, in his theory of female sexual development. Nancy Kang has discussed "the misandric impulse" in relation to the works of Toni Morrison.

In his book, Gender and Judaism: The Transformation of Tradition, Harry Brod, a Professor of Philosophy and Humanities in the Department of Philosophy and Religion at the University of Northern Iowa, writes:

In the introduction to The Great Comic Book Heroes, Jules Feiffer writes that this is Superman's joke on the rest of us. Clark is Superman's vision of what other men are really like. We are scared, incompetent, and powerless, particularly around women. Though Feiffer took the joke good-naturedly, a more cynical response would see here the Kryptonian's misanthropy, his misandry embodied in Clark and his misogyny in his wish that Lois be enamored of Clark (much like Oberon takes out hostility toward Titania by having her fall in love with an ass in Shakespeare's Midsummer-Night's Dream).

In 2020, the explicitly misandric essay Moi les hommes, je les déteste (I Hate Men) by the French writer Pauline Harmange caused controversy in France after a government official threatened its publisher with criminal prosecution.

== In feminism ==
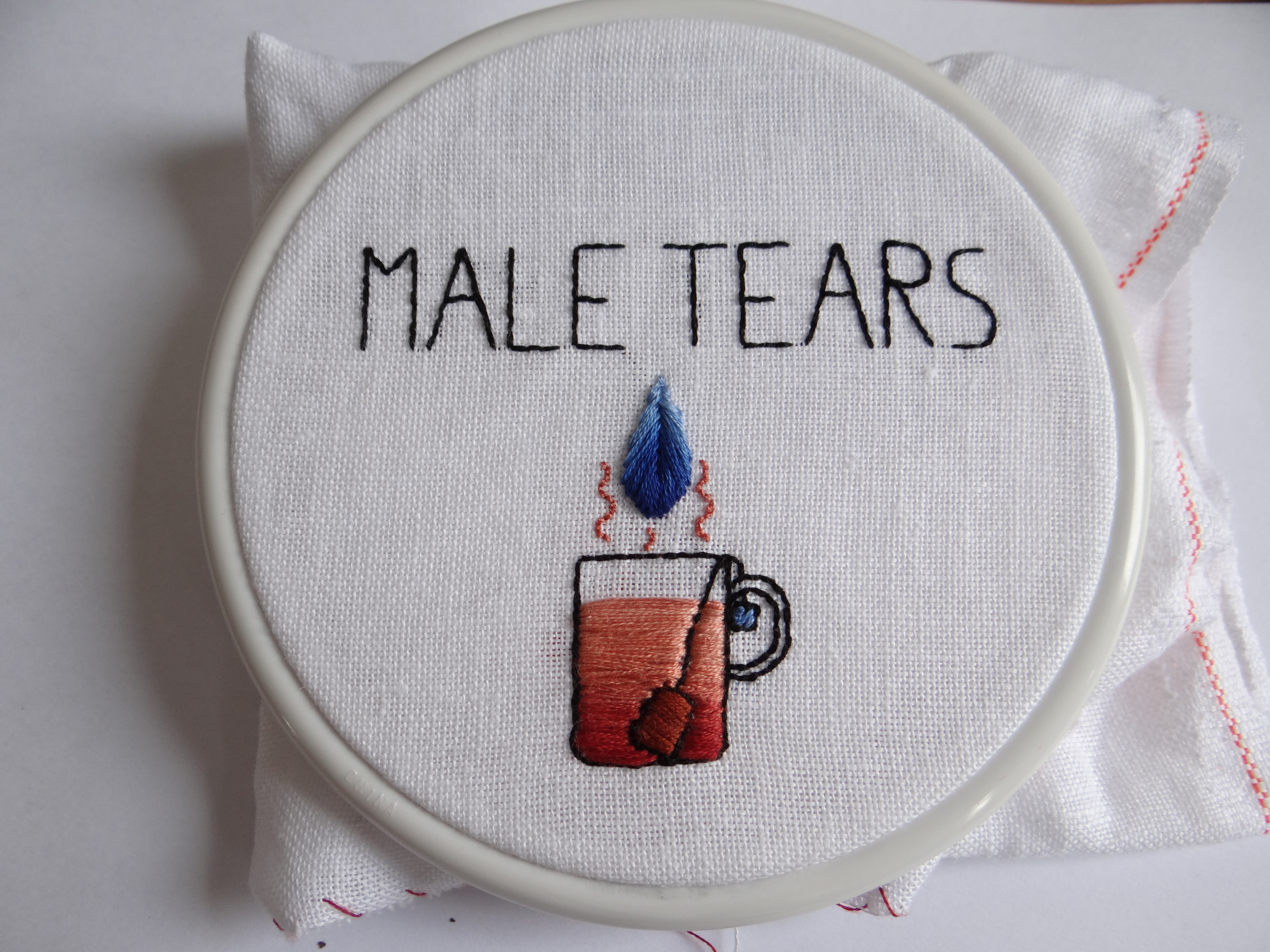
Entrepreneurs on Etsy sold embroidery parodying the concept of misandry.

Opponents of feminism often argue that feminism is misandrist; this argument has been criticized by scholars as promoting a false equivalence by relying on an ahistorical concept of a parallel to misogyny.

According to historian Alice Echols, the misandry displayed by Solanas in her tract the SCUM Manifesto was not typical for radical feminists of the time: "Solanas's unabashed misandry—especially her belief in men's biological inferiority—her endorsement of relationships between 'independent women,' and her dismissal of sex as 'the refuge of the mindless' contravened the sort of radical feminism which prevailed in most women's groups across the country." Radical feminist Andrea Dworkin criticized what she called a biological determinist strand that she found "with increasing frequency in feminist circles"; according to Dworkin, this included the view that males are biologically inferior to women and violent by nature, requiring a gendercide to allow for the emergence of a "new Übermensch Womon".

Melinda Kanner and Kristin J. Anderson argue that "man-hater feminist" represents the popular antifeminist myth which has no any scientific evidences, and perhaps it's rather the antifeminists who hate men.

Feminist author bell hooks writes that the contemporary feminist movement was from its beginnings portrayed in the mass media as man-hating, even though anti-male factions were a small minority of women's liberation advocates. Hooks argues that liberal feminists' demonization of men as all-powerful misogynist oppressors was a product of bourgeois white women's envy of the privileges held by upper-class white men, and that such anti-male sentiments "alienated many poor and working class women, particularly non-white women" from the movement. She writes that anti-male factions received outsized attention from the mass media, leading the men's movement to take an anti-female stance which "mirrored the most negative aspects" of the women's movement.

Sociologist Anthony Synnott argues that certain forms of feminism present a misandristic view of gender. He argues that men are presented as having power over others regardless of the actual power they possess and that some feminists define the experience of being male inaccurately through writing on masculinity. He further argues that some forms of feminism create an in-group of women, simplifies the nuances of gender issues, demonizes those who are not feminists and legitimizes victimization by way of retributive justice. Reviewing Synnott, Roman Kuhar argues that Synnott might not accurately represent the views of feminism, commenting that "whether it re-thinks men in a manner in which men have not been thought of in feminist theory, is another question."

Sociologist Allan G. Johnson argues in The Gender Knot: Unraveling our Patriarchal Legacy that accusations of man-hating have been used to put down feminists and to shift attention onto men, reinforcing a male-centered culture. Johnson posits that culture offers no comparable anti-male ideology to misogyny and that "people often confuse men as individuals with men as a dominant and privileged category of people. Given the reality of women's oppression, male privilege, and men's enforcement of both, it's hardly surprising that every woman should have moments where she resents or even hates 'men.'" [emphasis in original]

A meta-analysis in 2023 published in the journal Psychology of Women Quarterly investigated the stereotype of feminists' attitudes to men and concluded that feminist views of men were no different than that of non-feminists or men towards men, and termed the phenomenon the misandry myth: "We term the focal stereotype the misandry myth in light of the evidence that it is false and widespread, and discuss its implications for the movement."

== See also ==
- Airline seating sex discrimination controversy – Criticism of airlines for seating policy
- Androcide – Systematic murder of males
- Are All Men Pedophiles?
- Bachelor tax – Punitive tax imposed on unmarried men
- Boys are stupid, throw rocks at them! controversy – Clothing design controversy
- Circumcision controversies
- Female chauvinism – Belief in the superiority of one's own group
- Gynocentrism – Dominant or exclusive focus on women in theory or practice
- Male expendability – Hypothesis in anthropology
- Men's studies – Interdisciplinary academic field
- Reverse sexism – Sociological concept
- Separatist feminism – Theory of women's separation from men
- Straw feminism – Distortion or fabrication of feminist arguments
- TERF – Movement originating within radical feminism
- Testosterone poisoning – Popular, humorous term for excess masculinity
