= Black male studies =

Area of study within Black studies

Black male studies (BMS), also known as Black men's studies, Black masculinist studies, African-American male studies, and African-American men's studies, is an area of study within the interdisciplinary field of Black studies that primarily focuses on the study of Black men and boys. Its research focus includes the study of Black manhood and Black masculinity, and it draws from disciplines such as history, philosophy, and sociology.

== Overview ==
Black male studies primarily focuses on the study of Black men and boys. Its research focus includes the study of Black manhood and Black masculinity, and it draws from disciplines such as history, philosophy, and sociology. Black male studies uses a Black male-centered paradigm designed to critique past and present gender studies publications on Black males as well as centers and contends with the problem of anti-Black misandry (“disdain for Black men and boys”).

Many BMS scholars characterize past and present gender studies publications with carrying assumptions of Black men and boys being criminals and assailants of Black women and white women. Consequently, past and present gender studies publications are claimed to contain paradigms, theories, and narratives that are grounded in anti-Black misandry, along with a theoretically constructed language of hypermasculinity, and tend to be ill-equipped at understanding Black males as victims. The past and present vulnerability of Black males, ranging from rape, to sexual abuse, to death, which tends to be overlooked and downplayed by rhetoric about hypermasculinity, underscores the need to develop new language, narratives, and theories for understanding Black males.

Black male studies aims to advance the study of Black males of all ages, beyond the scope of Black male stereotypes, and humanize the theoretical accounts of Black males. Its prescribed research focus includes creativity, intellect, and the health of Black males of all ages as well the socialization of adult Black males as it relates to family, fatherhood, and positive relations with their children, and the social and psychological methods of coping used by Black males. Black male studies also seeks to liberate Black males from the gender teleology that has been set upon them. Additionally, Black male studies seeks to provide counternarratives to hegemonic narratives about Black males; these counternarratives include highlighting the victimization of Black males, which operates counter to hegemonic narratives that pathologically imagine and depict Black male as agents of their own racial discrimination and socioeconomic isolation. Furthermore, Black male studies seeks to counter these narratives about Black males through empirical testing, theory development, and the lived experiences and voices of Black males. Black male studies seeks to have a re-evaluation of the body of work on the maleness, manhood, and masculinity of Black males and their role in relation to white patriarchy.

== History ==
Richard Majors, who is an Afro-psychologist, is attributed with creating African American Male Studies in 1991.

In 1992, J. Billson and R. Majors developed the cool pose theory.

In 1998, Harold Mason developed an empirical community college persistence model for African American males.

In 2010, S. R. Harper developed the anti-deficit achievement paradigm.

In 2013, E. C. Bush and L. Bush developed the African American male theory.

Through the authoring of Tommy J. Curry's The Man-Not: Race, Class, Genre, and the Dilemmas of Black Manhood (2017), the theoretical foundations for and the necessity of Black male studies as a distinct area of study was shown, the presence of Black male studies in philosophy was made known, and the necessity for its multidisciplinary focus on topics such as class, law, masculinity, politics, and race were shown. Curry's 2018 work Killing Boogeymen: Phallicism and The Misandric Mischaracterization of Black Males in Theory was also foundational for Black male studies. Due to how significant these works have been to Black male studies, Lawrence A. Rasheed indicated that Curry could be considered the "father" of Black male studies. However, Rasheed also indicated that numerous scholars from inside and outside of academia contributed to the foundations of Black male studies.

In 2019, Tommy J. Curry became the editor for the book series Black Male Studies: A Series Exploring the Paradoxes of Racially Subjugated Males at the Temple University Press. The book series was grounded in the post-intersectional paradigms of global South masculinities and social dominance theory, sought to address the existing shortcomings in masculinity studies publications, and aspired toward the development of empirically established theorization in Black male studies.

== Examination of the United States ==
The United States has been a primary focus of inquiry of Black male studies. BMS scholars claim that in the United States, Black males are excluded, otherized, ostracized, and discriminated against on the basis of race and sex. BMS scholars ground this treatment in a history of pathologized, prejudiced caricatures of Black people, and in particular, caricatures and views of Black males as being threats to the political and socioeconomic dominance and power of White males.

During the 19th century, the heteropatriarchal norms of family structure and society limited political and socioeconomic dominance and power to the realms of white manhood; the caricature of Black males as maliciously violent and animalistic stems from this 19th-century environment. Curry argues that White suffragettes, such as Susan B. Anthony and Elizabeth Cady Stanton, were influential in the expansion of the power of White supremacy through their advocating for the mass lynching of Black males and through the demonization of Black males so as to affect their right to vote. In addition to promoting racial unity among Whites during the mid-19th century, Curry argues that White women sought to reinforce the system of segregation and disenfranchise Black men amid the first half of the 20th century. This was established through various means, such as establishing Ku Klux Klan branches, joining citizens councils, and leading public campaigns. Through the political and scholarly efforts of White feminists amid the 1970s, Black militancy was portrayed as a danger to the womanhood of White women. In spite of this documented history between Black males and White women, and criticism of the image of White women having occurred since the 1960s, Curry claims that the image of White women has remained one of being "politically liberal, socially progressive, and peaceful."

BMS scholars examine disparities between punishments for violations of the patriarchal social order and racial caste system of the southern United States, claiming that the severity of these punishments were greater for Black males than Black females. Amid slavery and Jim Crow segregation, Black males of all ages were enslaved, lynched, and raped by White men and women. Jim Crow laws, segregation, and economic policies of the capitalist system are studied in how they oppressed and discriminated against Black males as well as deny Black males means of and opportunities for self-actualization of their manhood. BMS scholars also attribute this to anti-Black misandry.

Through the lens of social dominance theory, Black males are understood to be out-group males who are subordinated by and through the hegemonic system of in-group White males; this dynamic is particularly exacerbated as it relates to material resources and symbolic group boundaries. The constructed narrative around out-group Black males increasingly shifts toward one of Black males being sexual threats to the endogamous outcomes of White people as economic abundance increases.

== Relationship with feminism and intersectionality ==
In the 1960s and 1970s, white feminists and racist specialists in criminology developed gender theories that are grounded in racist constructions of Black manhood as imitations of white manhood; these theories continue to be used by intersectionality. Despite decades of use, evidence has not been produced to support these theories, which, thereby, shows the theories as being mainly grounded in ideology and ideological assumptions. In particular, the theories are grounded in ideological assumptions, such as Black males having incomplete identities, who then have ideological narratives that create caricatures of Black males from these assumed incomplete identities.

Black male studies establishes anti-Black misandry as enshrined in academia, particularly in academic literature and theories of feminism and intersectionality. Anti-Black misandry has been defined as “the cumulative assertions of Black male inferiority due to errant psychologies of lack, dispositions of deviance, or hyper-personality traits (e.g., hyper-sexuality, hyper-masculinity) which rationalize the criminalization, phobics, and sanctioning of Black male life” and the “hatred, fear, and negation of Black males”.

The characterization of Black males as patriarchs who are committed to dominance is deemed by BMS scholars to be constructed by a psychologism for intersectionality that remains unchallenged; this characterization, along with the assumption of male privilege being attributable to Black males, in relation to evidence of Black males as being out-group males, has resulted in it being identified as “intersectionality’s Black male problem.” Consequently, what has been sought in Black male studies is for the portrayal of White patriarchy providing benefits to the masculinity of Black males to be re-evaluated. BMS scholars claim that intersectionality ideologically emphasizes imitation and criminality in Black manhood, and they contrast this by characterizing Black manhood as “positive, functional, and humanist.”

Black male studies also seeks to liberate Black males from what is deemed a deterministic lens in current gender frameworks that views Black males as objects rather than subjects. Further, Black male studies tackles subculture-of-violence reasoning about Black males, labeling it as outdated, pseudoscientific assumptions from racist criminology that are repackaged as being state-of-the-art feminist theory; Timothy Golden has labeled this as "theoretical dehumanization."

Adebayo Oluwayomi cites bell hooks' 2004 book We Real Cool: Black Men and Masculinity as an example of academic literature that uses intersectionality to pathologically characterize Black males without use of empirical data. Oluwayomi writes that Black feminist theories describe "Black males as what they are not—the man-not."

== Notable concepts ==
=== Theory of phallicism ===
Tommy J. Curry defines phallicism as "the condition by which males of a subordinated racialized or ethnicized group are simultaneously imagined to be a sexual threat and predatory, and libidinally constituted as sexually desirous by the fantasies or fetishes of the dominant racial group." The concept of the subordinate male target draws from Jim Sidanius's Subordinate Male Target Hypothesis which is a concept in social dominance theory, that serves as the basis for the concept of the targeted racialized male, central to the theory of phallicism. The Subordinate Male Target Hypothesis, under the premise that arbitrary-set discrimination is primarily a form of intrasexual competition perpetuated by males and directed against males, understands subordinate outgroup males as specific primary targets for arbitrary-set discrimination. Curry's scholarship on sexually vulnerable, racialized males in Black male studies has also contributed to the scholarship in Holocaust studies.

=== Black PlayCrit ===
Black PlayCrit was coined by Nathaniel Bryan as "the specificity of Blackness and anti-Black misandric violence in boyhood play experiences." Black PlayCrit adds to the contributions of critical race theory, Black critical theory, and Black male studies by attempting to progress beyond the theoretically constructed language of hypermasculinity and be theoretically capable of taking into account the racialized and gendered mistreatment, as well as the victimization and vulnerability, of Black boys. Due to the perception among BMS scholars that the racial theorization of critical race theory doesn't particularly address the problem of anti-Blackness, distinct from White supremacy, Black critical theory attempts to particularly address the problem of anti-Blackness through the construction and framing of ideas and language to describe it in the lives of Black people as well as the development of counternarratives. According to Bryan, Black PlayCrit utilizes the following notions: "(a) The idea of Play-Not is endemic to Black boys’ play experiences; (b) the idea of the Play-Past/Play-Present and Future nexus makes explicit connections to past, present, and future acts of antimisandric violence in Black boys’ play; and (c) the idea of the public pedagogy of Black boyhood play serves as concept and pedagogy which challenge anti-Black misandry in Black boys’ play."

BlackBoyCrit (Black boy critical theory) pedagogy adds to Black PlayCrit literacies by addressing the manifold problems (e.g., emotional, psychological, pedagogical) that affect Black boys during their early period of schooling. BlackBoyCrit pedagogy also derives its direction and basis from Black critical theory (BlackCrit) and Black male studies. BlackBoyCrit pedagogy has been constructed to emphasize the importance of Black male teachers and Black boys, both during the early period of schooling and outside of it.

The research method of Black male studies is one of the research methods used in Black male literacy education. A continuous pattern found throughout academic works from Black male studies is Black male accounts of experiencing racial battle fatigue, which is defined as "the physical and psychological toll taken due to constant and unceasing discrimination, micro-aggressions, and stereotype threat." Consequently, many Black males "suffer from forms of generalized anxiety manifested by both physical and emotional symptom." Black male literacy development also corresponds with this pattern of racial battle fatigue.

== Notable academics ==
- Quaylan Allen
- Taharka Anderson
- Daniel Black
- Derrick R. Brooms
- Edward C. Bush
- Nana Lawson Bush V
- Gwenetta Curry
- Tommy J. Curry, Personal Chair of Africana Philosophy and Black Male Studies
- Darrius Hills
- Tyrone Howard
- John L. Hudgins
- Amir Jaima
- T. Hasan Johnson
- Ricky L. Jones
- Serie McDougal, III
- Seulghee Lee
- Adebayo Ogungbure
- Theodore S. Ransaw
- Lawrence Rasheed
- Dalitso Ruwe
- John N. Singer
- Damariyé L. Smith
- Makonnen Tendaji
- Uwazi Zamani

== Scholarly and academic journals ==
- Journal of African American Male Studies
- Journal of African American Males in Education
- Journal of African American Men
