= The Gender Knot: Unraveling our Patriarchal Legacy =

1997 book by Allan G. Johnson

- Cover of the first edition
- Author: Allan G. Johnson
- Language: English
- Subject: Women's Studies, Sociology
- Published: 1997 (Temple University Press)
- Publication place: United States
- Media type: Print (hardcover and paperback)
- Pages: 294 (hardcover edition)
- ISBN: 1-56639-518-6

The Gender Knot: Unraveling our Patriarchal Legacy is a 1997 book by American sociologist Allan G. Johnson. Johnson addresses the concept of patriarchy and its effects on the lives of both men and women. He states that avoiding "the path of least resistance" is the key to combating gender inequality. He encourages readers to fight the patriarchy in their daily lives.

== Summary ==
In The Gender Knot, Johnson responds to men's and women's experiences in living with gender inequality. He posits explanations as to what patriarchy is and isn't, how it works, and what gets in the way of understanding and doing something about it.

According to Johnson people's experience with sexism is a direct result of the patriarchal structure of our society and that the average person helps to reinforce the patriarchy by not questioning the status quo. He says that men directly benefit from patriarchy, and that they instead should contribute to the feminist movement by addressing their own male privilege. He allows that men can be both privileged and made to feel powerless by the patriarchy. He uses what he calls the Tree of patriarchy as a way to visualize the system of patriarchy. He also criticizes the use of the terms misandry and reverse sexism and the motives of the men's rights movement.

== Reception ==
Critical reception for The Gender Knot has been positive. Abby L. Ferber, writing for Gender and Society, called The Gender Knot "a unique book that fills a void in the literature on gender." In Off Our Backs, Karla Mantilla called it "a brilliant accounting of patriarchy." In a review for Contemporary Sociology, Rebecca Bach states that Johnson follows the tradition of "the best of feminist theory" in his writing.
