= Social dominance orientation =

Personality trait favoring social hierarchies

Social dominance orientation (SDO) is a personality trait measuring an individual's support for social hierarchy and the extent to which they desire their in-group be superior to out-groups. SDO is conceptualized under social dominance theory as a measure of individual differences in levels of group-based discrimination; that is, it is a measure of an individual's preference for hierarchy within any social system and the domination over lower-status groups. It is a predisposition toward anti-egalitarianism within and between groups.

Individuals who score high in SDO desire to maintain and, in many cases, increase the differences between social statuses of different groups, as well as individual group members. People high in SDO also prefer hierarchical group orientations. Often, people who score high in SDO adhere strongly to belief in a "dog-eat-dog" world. It has also been found that men are generally higher than women in SDO measures. A study of undergraduates found that SDO does not have a strong positive relationship with authoritarianism.

== Social dominance theory ==
SDO was first proposed by Jim Sidanius and Felicia Pratto as part of their social dominance theory (SDT). SDO is the key measurable component of SDT that is specific to it.

SDT begins with the empirical observation that surplus-producing social systems have a threefold group-based hierarchy structure: age-based, gender-based and "arbitrary set-based", which can include race, class, sexual orientation, caste, ethnicity, religious affiliation, etc. Age-based hierarchies invariably give more power to adults and middle-age people than children and younger adults, and gender-based hierarchies invariably grant more power to one gender over others, but arbitrary-set hierarchies—though quite resilient—are truly arbitrary.

SDT is based on three primary assumptions:

1. While age- and gender-based hierarchies will tend to exist within all social systems, arbitrary-set systems of social hierarchy will invariably emerge within social systems producing sustainable economic surpluses.
2. Most forms of group conflict and oppression (e.g., racism, homophobia, ethnocentrism, sexism, classism, regionalism) can be regarded as different manifestations of the same basic human predisposition to form group-based hierarchies.
3. Human social systems are subject to the counterbalancing influences of hierarchy-enhancing (HE) forces, producing and maintaining ever higher levels of group-based social inequality, and hierarchy-attenuating (HA) forces, producing greater levels of group-based social equality.

SDO is the individual attitudinal aspect of SDT. It is influenced by group status, socialization, and temperament. In turn, it influences support for HE and HA "legitimating myths", defined as "values, attitudes, beliefs, causal attributions and ideologies" that in turn justify social institutions and practices that either enhance or attenuate group hierarchy. Legitimising myths are used by SDT to refer to widely accepted ideologies that are accepted as explaining how the world works—SDT does not have a position on the veracity, morality or rationality of these beliefs, as the theory is intended to be a descriptive account of group-based inequality rather than a normative theory.

== Early development ==
While the correlation of gender with SDO scores has been empirically measured and confirmed, the impact of temperament and socialization is less clear. Duckitt has suggested a model of attitude development for SDO, suggesting that unaffectionate socialisation in childhood causes a tough-minded attitude. According to Duckitt's model, people high in tough-minded personality are predisposed to view the world as a competitive place in which resource competition is zero-sum. A desire to compete, which fits with social dominance orientation, influences in-group and outside-group attitudes. People high in SDO also believe that hierarchies are present in all aspects of society and are more likely to agree with statements such as "It's probably a good thing that certain groups are at the top and other groups are at the bottom".

== Scale ==
SDO has been measured by a series of scales that have been refined over time, all of which contain a balance of pro- and contra-trait statements or phrases. A 7-point Likert scale is used for each item; participants rate their agreement or disagreement with the statements from 1 (strongly disagree) to 7 (strongly agree). Most of the research was conducted with the SDO-5 (a 14-point scale) and SDO-6. The SDO-7 scale is the most recent scale measuring social dominance orientation, which embeds two sub-dimensions: dominance (SDO-D) and anti-egalitarianism (SDO-E).

=== SDO-7 items ===
==== Dominance sub-scale ====
1. Some groups of people must be kept in their place.
2. It's probably a good thing that certain groups are at the top and other groups are at the bottom.
3. An ideal society requires some groups to be on top and others to be on the bottom.
4. Some groups of people are simply inferior to other groups.
5. Groups at the bottom are just as deserving as groups at the top. (reverse-scored)
6. No one group should dominate in society. (reverse-scored)
7. Groups at the bottom should not have to stay in their place. (reverse-scored)
8. Group dominance is a poor principle. (reverse-scored)

==== Anti-egalitarianism sub-scale ====
1. We should not push for group equality.
2. We shouldn't try to guarantee that every group has the same quality of life.
3. It is unjust to try to make groups equal.
4. Group equality should not be our primary goal.
5. We should work to give all groups an equal chance to succeed. (reverse-scored)
6. We should do what we can to equalize conditions for different groups. (reverse-scored)
7. No matter how much effort it takes, we ought to strive to ensure that all groups have the same chance in life. (reverse-scored)
8. Group equality should be our ideal. (reverse-scored)

=== SDO-6 items ===
1. Some groups of people are just more worthy than others.
2. In getting what you want, it is sometimes necessary to use force against other groups.
3. It's OK if some groups have more of a chance in life than others.
4. To get ahead in life, it is sometimes necessary to step on other groups.
5. If certain groups stayed in their place, we would have fewer problems.
6. It's probably a good thing that certain groups are at the top and other groups are at the bottom.
7. Inferior groups should stay in their place.
8. Sometimes other groups must be kept in their place.
9. It would be good if groups could be equal. (reverse-scored)
10. Group equality should be our ideal. (reverse-scored)
11. All groups should be given an equal chance in life. (reverse-scored)
12. We should do what we can to equalize conditions for different groups. (reverse-scored)
13. Increased social equality is beneficial to society. (reverse-scored)
14. We would have fewer problems if we treated people more equally. (reverse-scored)
15. We should strive to make incomes as equal as possible. (reverse-scored)
16. No group should dominate in society. (reverse-scored)

Keying is reversed on questions 9 through 16, to control for acquiescence bias.

== Criticisms of the construct ==
Rubin and Hewstone (2004) argue that social dominance research has changed its focus dramatically over the years, and these changes have been reflected in different versions of the social dominance orientation construct. Social dominance orientation was originally defined as "the degree to which individuals desire social dominance and superiority for themselves and their primordial groups over other groups" (p. 209). It then quickly changed to not only "(a) a...desire for and value given to in-group dominance over out-groups" but also "(b) the desire for nonegalitarian, hierarchical relationships between groups within the social system" (p. 1007). The most recent measure of social dominance orientation (see SDO-6 above) focuses on the "general desire for unequal relations among social groups, regardless of whether this means ingroup domination or ingroup subordination" (p. 312). Given these changes, Rubin and Hewstone believe that evidence for social dominance theory should be considered "as supporting three separate SDO hypotheses, rather than one single theory" (p. 22).

== Group-based and individual dominance ==
Robert Altemeyer said that people with a high SDO want more power (agreeing with items such as "Winning is not the first thing; it's the only thing"). These observations are at odds with conceptualisations of SDO as a group-based phenomenon, suggesting that the SDO reflects interpersonal dominance, not only group-based dominance. This is supported by Sidanius and Pratto's own evidence that high-SDO individuals tend to gravitate toward hierarchy-enhancing jobs and institutions, such as law enforcement, that are themselves hierarchically structured vis-a-vis individuals within them.

== Relations with other personality traits ==
=== Connection with right-wing authoritarianism ===
SDO correlates weakly with right-wing authoritarianism (RWA) (r ≈ .18). Both predict attitudes, such as sexist, racist, and heterosexist attitudes. The two contribute to different forms of prejudice: SDO correlates to higher prejudice against subordinate and disadvantaged groups, RWA correlates to higher prejudice against groups deemed threatening to traditional norms, while both are associated with increases in prejudice for "dissident" groups. SDO and RWA contribute to prejudice in an additive rather than interactive way (the interaction of SDO and RWA accounted, in one study, for an average of less than .001% variance in addition to their linear combination), that is the association between SDO and prejudice is similar regardless of a person's level of RWA, and vice versa. Crawford et al. (2013) found that RWA and SDO differentially predicted interpretations of media reports about socially threatening (for example, gays and lesbians) and disadvantaged groups (for example, African Americans), respectively. Subjects with high SDO, but not RWA, scores reacted positively to articles and authors that opposed affirmative action, and negatively to pro-affirmative-action article content. Moreover, RWA, but not SDO, predicted subjects' evaluations of same-sex relationships, such that high-RWA individuals favored anti-same-sex relationships article content and low-RWA individuals favorably rated pro-same-sex relationships content.

=== Correlation with Big Five personality traits ===
Studies on the relationship of SDO with the higher order Big Five personality traits have associated high SDO with lower openness to experience and lower agreeableness. Meta-analytic aggregation of these studies indicates that the association with low Agreeableness is more robust than the link to Openness to experience. Individuals low in Agreeableness are more inclined to report being motivated by self-interest and self-indulgence. They also tend to be more self-centred and are more 'tough-minded' compared to those who are high on Agreeableness, leading them to perceive the world to be a highly competitive place, where the way to success is through power and dominance – all of which predict SDO.

Low Openness, by contrast, aligns more strongly with RWA; thinking in clear and straightforward moral codes that dictate how society as a system should function. Being low in Openness prompts the individual to value security, stability and control: fundamental elements of RWA.

==== Facet-level associations ====
In case of SDO all five facets of Agreeableness significantly correlate (negatively), even after controlling for RWA. 'Tough-mindedness' (opposite of tender-mindedness' facet) is the strongest predictor of SDO. After the effect of SDO is controlled for, only one facet of agreeableness is predictive of RWA. Facets also distinguish SDO from RWA, with 'Dominators' (individuals high on SDO), but not 'Authoritarians' (individuals who score high on RWA), having been found to be lower in dutifulness, morality, sympathy and co-operation. RWA is also associated with religiosity, conservativism, righteousness, and, to some extent, a conscientious moral code, which distinguishes RWA from SDO.

=== Empathy ===
SDO is inversely related to empathy. Facets of Agreeableness that are linked to altruism, sympathy and compassion are the strongest predictors of SDO. SDO has been suggested to have a link with callous affect (which is to be found on the psychopathy sub-scale), the 'polar opposite' of empathy.

The relationship between SDO and (lack of) empathy has been found to be reciprocal – with equivocal findings. Some studies show that empathy significantly impacts SDO, whereas other research suggest the opposite effect is more robust; that SDO predicts empathy. The latter showcases how powerful of a predictor SDO may be, not only affecting individual's certain behaviours, but potentially influencing upstream the proneness to those behaviours. It also suggests that those scoring high on SDO proactively avoid scenarios that could prompt them to be more empathetic or tender-minded. This avoidance decreases concern for other's welfare.

Empathy indirectly affects generalized prejudice through its negative relationship with SDO. It also has a direct effect on generalized prejudice, as lack of empathy makes one unable to put oneself in the other person's shoes, which predicts prejudice and antidemocratic views.

Some recent research has suggested the relationship between SDO and empathy may be more complex, arguing that people with high levels of SDO are less likely to show empathy towards low status people but more likely to show it towards high status people. Conversely, people with low SDO levels demonstrate the reverse behaviour.

== Other findings and criticisms ==
Research suggests that people high in SDO tend to support using violence in intergroup relations while those low in SDO oppose it; however, it has also been argued that people low in SDO can also support (and those high in it oppose) violence in some circumstances, if the violence is seen as a form of counterdominance. For example, Lebanese people low in SDO approved more strongly of terrorism against the West than Lebanese people high in SDO, seemingly because it entailed a low-status group (Lebanese) attacking a high-status one (Westerners). Amongst Palestinians, lower SDO levels were correlated with more emotional hostility towards Israelis and more parochial empathy for Palestinians.

Low levels of SDO have been found to result in individuals possessing positive biases towards outgroup members, for example regarding outgroup members as less irrational than ingroup members, the reverse of what is usually found. Low levels of SDO have also been found to be linked to being better at detecting inequalities applied to low-status groups but not the same inequalities applied to high-status groups. A person's SDO levels can also affect the degree to which they perceive hierarchies, either over or underestimating them, although the effect sizes may be quite small. A person's SDO levels can also shift depending on their identification with their ingroup and low levels of SDO thus may reflect a more complex relationship to ideas of inequality and social hierarchy than just egalitarianism. While research has indicated that SDO is a strong predictor of various forms of prejudice, it has also been suggested that SDO may not be related to prejudice per se but rather be dependent upon the target, as SDO has been found to correlate positively with prejudice towards hierarchy-attenuating groups but negatively with prejudice towards hierarchy-enhancing groups.

In the contemporary US, research indicates that most people tend to score fairly low on the SDO scale, with an average score of 2.98 on a 7-point scale (with 7 being the highest in SDO and 1 the lowest), with a standard deviation of 1.19. This has also been found to apply cross-culturally, with the average SDO score being around 2.6, although there was some variation (Switzerland scoring somewhat lower and Japan scoring substantially higher). A study in New Zealand found that 91% of the population had low to moderate SDO levels (levels of 1–4 on the scale), indicating that the majority of variance in SDO occurs within this band. A 2013 multi-national study found average scores ranged from 2.5 to 4. Because SDO scales tend to skew towards egalitarianism, some researchers have argued that this has caused a misinterpretation of correlations between SDO scores and other variables, arguing that low-SDO scorers, rather than high-SDO scorers, are possibly driving most of the correlations. Thus SDO research may actually be discovering the psychology of egalitarianism rather than the reverse. Samantha Stanley argues that "high" SDO scorers are generally in the middle of the SDO scale and thus she suggests their score do not actually represent an endorsement of inequality but rather a greater tolerance or ambivalence towards it than low SDO scorers. Stanley suggests that true high-SDO scorers are possibly quite rare and that researchers need to make clearer what exactly they are defining high-SDO scores as, as prior studies did not always report the actual level of SDO endorsement from high-scorers. Some researchers have raised concerns that the trait is studied under an ideological framework of viewing group-based interactions as one of victims and victimisers (hence its label as social dominance orientation), and that research into SDO should instead look into social organisation rather than social dominance.

SDO has been found to be related to color-blindness as a racial ideology. For low-SDO individuals, color-blindness predicts more negative attitudes towards ethnic minorities but for high-SDO individuals, it predicts more positive attitudes. SDO levels can also interact with other variables. When assessing blame for the 2011 England riots, high-SDO individuals uniformly blamed ethnic diversity regardless of whether they agreed with official government discourse, whereas low-SDO individuals did not blame ethnic diversity if they disagreed with official government discourse but did blame ethnic diversity if they did agree, almost to the same degree as high-SDO individuals. Another study found that in a mock hiring experiment, participants high in SDO were more likely to favour a white applicant while those low in SDO were more likely to favour a black applicant, while in mock-juror research, high-SDO white jurors showed anti-black bias and low-SDO white jurors pro-black bias. Low-SDO individuals may also support hierarchy-enhancing beliefs (such as gender essentialism and meritocracy) if they believe this will support diversity.

SDO has also been found to relate to attitudes towards social class. Self-perceived attractiveness can also interact with a person's SDO levels (due to perceived effects on social class); changing a person's self-perceived level of attractiveness affected their self-perceived social class and thus their SDO levels.

A study report published by Nature in 2017 indicates there may be a correlation between FMRI scanned brain response to social ranks and the SDO scale. Subjects who tended to prefer hierarchical social structures and to promote socially dominant behaviors as measured by SDO exhibited stronger responses in the right anterior dorsolateral prefrontal cortex (right aDLPFC) when facing superior players. The French National Agency for Research funded study involved 28 male subjects and used FMRI measurements to demonstrate that response in the right aDLPFC to social ranks was strongly correlated with participant SDO scores measuring response to social ranks.

== Correlation with conservative political views ==
Felicia Pratto and her colleagues have found evidence that a high social dominance orientation is strongly correlated with conservative political views, and opposition to programs and policies that aim to promote equality (such as affirmative action, laws advocating equal rights for homosexuals, women in combat, etc.).

There has been some debate within the psychology community on what the relation is between SDO and racism/sexism. One explanation suggests that opposition to programs that promote equality need not be based on racism or sexism but on a "principled conservatism", that is, a "concern for equality of opportunity, color-blindness, and genuine conservative values".

Some principled-conservatism theorists have suggested that racism and conservatism are independent, and only very weakly correlated among the highly educated, who truly understand the concepts of conservative values and attitudes. In an effort to examine the relationship between education, SDO, and racism, Sidanius and his colleagues asked approximately 4,600 Euro-Americans to complete a survey in which they were asked about their political and social attitudes, and their social dominance orientation was assessed. "These findings contradict much of the case for the principled conservatism hypothesis, which maintains that political values that are largely devoid of racism, especially among highly educated people." Contrary to what these theorists would predict, correlations among SDO, political conservatism, and racism were strongest among the most educated, and weakest among the least educated. Sidanius and his colleagues hypothesized this was because the most educated conservatives tend to be more invested in the hierarchical structure of society and in maintaining the inequality of the status quo in society in order to safeguard their status.

SDO levels can also shift in response to threats to political party identity, with conservatives responding to party identity threat by increasing SDO levels and liberals responding by lowering them.

== Culture ==
SDO is typically measured as an individual personality construct. However, cultural forms of SDO have been discovered on the macro level of society. Discrimination, prejudice and stereotyping can occur at various levels of institutions in society, such as transnational corporations, government agencies, schools and criminal justice systems. The basis of this theory of societal level SDO is rooted in evolutionary psychology, which states that humans have an evolved predisposition to express social dominance that is heightened under certain social conditions (such as group status) and is also mediated by factors such as individual personality and temperament. Democratic societies are lower in SDO measures The more that a society encourages citizens to cooperate with others and feel concern for the welfare of others, the lower the SDO in that culture. High levels of national income and empowerment of women are also associated with low national SDO, whereas more traditional societies with lower income, male domination and more closed institutional systems are associated with a higher SDO. Individuals who are socialized within these traditional societies are more likely to internalize gender hierarchies and are less likely to challenge them.

== Biology and sexual differences ==
The biology of SDO is unknown.

Plenty of evidence suggests that men tend to score higher on SDO than women, and this is true across different countries, cultures, age-groups, classes, religions and educational levels, with the difference generally being an average of half a point on the scale. Researchers argue for an 'invariance' in the difference between men and women's SDO; suggesting that even if all other factors were to be controlled for, the difference between men and women's SDO would still remain – this however in some cases has been challenged, although exceptions may be due to complex and highly dependent factors.

Males are observed to be more socially hierarchical, as indicated by speaking time, and yielding to interruptions. Males higher average SDO levels has been suggested as an explanation for gender differences in support for policies; males are more likely to support military force, defence spending and the death penalty and less likely to support social welfare or minimum wage legislation, while females are more likely to believe in the reverse. This is because males, due to being more likely to have higher SDO scores, are more likely to view inequalities as the natural result of competition and thus are more likely to have a negative view of policies designed to mitigate or dilute the effects of competition.

Taking a socio-cultural perspective, it is argued that the gap between women and men in SDO is dependent upon societal norms prescribing different expectations for gender roles of men and women.Men are expected to be dominant and assertive, whereas women are supposed to be submissive and tender.

Differences between male and female attributional cognitive complexity are suggested to contribute to the gender gap in SDO. Women have been found to be more attributionally complex compared to men; they use more contextual information and evaluate social information more precisely. It is proposed that lower social status prompts higher cognitive complexity in order to compensate for the lack of control in that social situation by processing it more attentively and evaluating it more in depth. The difference in cognitive complexity between high and low status individuals could contribute to the differences between male and female SDO.

Some evidence suggests that both the dominance and anti-egalitarianism dimensions of SDO are determined by genetic, rather than environmental, factors.

== See also ==
- Basking in reflected glory
- Caste
- Common ingroup identity
- Demagogy
- Kyriarchy
- Moral Majority
- Noble lie
- Right-wing authoritarianism
- Winner and loser culture

== Bibliography ==
- Akrami, Nazar; Ekehammar, Bo (2006-01-01). "Right-Wing Authoritarianism and Social Dominance Orientation". Journal of Individual Differences. 27 (3): 117–126. doi:10.1027/1614-0001.27.3.117. ISSN 1614-0001.
- Altemeyer, Robert (2006). The Authoritarians (PDF). Cherry Hill Publishing. p. 166. ISBN 978-0-9723298-8-0. Archived from the original (PDF) on 28 March 2016.
- Alvarez, Mauricio J. (2018). Impact of Class-based Prejudice toward Defendants and Victims on Mock Jurors' Decision-Making (PhD). University of Nevada, Reno.
- Asbrock, Frank; Sibley, Chris G.; Duckitt, John (2009). "Right-wing authoritarianism and social dominance orientation and the dimensions of generalized prejudice: A longitudinal test". European Journal of Personality. 24 (4): 324–40. doi:10.1002/per.746. S2CID 144330426.
- Bäckström, Martin; Björklund, Fredrik (January 2007). "Structural Modeling of Generalized Prejudice". Journal of Individual Differences. 28 (1): 10–17. doi:10.1027/1614-0001.28.1.10. ISSN 1614-0001.
- Küpper, Beate; Zick, Andreas (February 2011). "Inverse gender gap in Germany: Social dominance orientation among men and women". International Journal of Psychology. 46 (1): 33–45. doi:10.1080/00207594.2010.491121. ISSN 1464-066X. PMID 22044131.
- Belmi, Peter; Neale, Margaret (July 2014). "Mirror, mirror on the wall, who's the fairest of them all? Thinking that one is attractive increases the tendency to support inequality". Organizational Behavior and Human Decision Processes. 124 (2): 133–149. doi:10.1016/j.obhdp.2014.03.002.
- Besta, Tomasz; Akbas, Gülçin; Renström, Emma; Kosakowska-Berezecka, Natasza; Vázquez, Alexandra (March 2019). "Liking low-status? Contextual and individual differences in attributional biases of low-status outgroup members". Journal of Social and Political Psychology. 7: 192–212. doi:10.5964/jspp.v7i1.951. S2CID 150674564.
- Bizumic, Boris; Kenny, Amanda; Iyer, Ravi; Tanuwira, Juliet; Huxley, Elizabeth (October 2016). "Are the Ethnically Tolerant Free of Discrimination, Prejudice and Political Intolerance?". European Journal of Social Psychology. 47 (4): 457–471. doi:10.1002/ejsp.2263.
- Bruneau, Emile; Kteily, Nour (July 2017). "The Enemy as Animal: Symmetric Dehumanization during Asymmetric Warfare". PLOS ONE. 12 (7) e0181422. Bibcode:2017PLoSO..1281422B. doi:10.1371/journal.pone.0181422. PMC 5528981. PMID 28746412.
- Campbell, Anne (May 2013). A mind of her own: The evolutionary psychology of women. OUP Oxford. doi:10.1093/acprof:oso/9780199609543.001.0001. ISBN 978-0-19-960954-3.
- Crawford, Jarret T.; Jussim, Lee; Cain, Thomas R.; Cohen, Florette (2013). "Right-wing authoritarianism and social dominance orientation differentially predict biased evaluations of media reports". Journal of Applied Social Psychology. 43: 163–74. doi:10.1111/j.1559-1816.2012.00990.x.
- Duckitt, John; Sibley, Chris G. (2007). "Right wing authoritarianism, social dominance orientation and the dimensions of generalized prejudice". European Journal of Personality. 21 (2): 113–30. doi:10.1002/per.614. S2CID 146128801.
- Eagly, Alice H.; Diekman, Amanda B.; Johannesen-Schmidt, Mary C.; Koenig, Anne M. (2004). "Gender Gaps in Sociopolitical Attitudes: A Social Psychological Analysis". Journal of Personality and Social Psychology. 87 (6): 796–816. doi:10.1037/0022-3514.87.6.796. PMID 15598107. S2CID 15716890.
- Ekehammar, Bo; Akrami, Nazar; Gylje, Magnus; Zakrisson, Ingrid (2004). "What matters most to prejudice: Big Five personality, Social Dominance Orientation, or Right-Wing Authoritarianism?". European Journal of Personality. 18 (6): 463–482. doi:10.1002/per.526. S2CID 54710763.
- Fasel, Nicole; Sarrasin, Oriane; Green, Eva; Mayor, Eric (February 2016). "Who Is to Blame? Official Discourse and Ethnic Diversity Attitudes During the 2011 Riots in England" (PDF). Political Psychology. 37 (5): 659–675. doi:10.1111/pops.12328.
- Fischer, Ronald; Hanke, Katja; Sibley, Chris G. (August 2012). "Cultural and institutional determinants of social dominance orientation: A cross-cultural meta-analysis of 27 societies". Political Psychology. 33 (4): 437–467. doi:10.1111/j.1467-9221.2012.00884.x. JSTOR 23260371.
- Foels, Rob; Reid, Landon D. (2010-04-15). "Gender Differences in Social Dominance Orientation: The Role of Cognitive Complexity". Sex Roles. 62 (9–10): 684–692. doi:10.1007/s11199-010-9775-5. ISSN 0360-0025. S2CID 143147990.
- Forsyth, Donelson R. (2009). "7". Ground Dynamics. New York: Wadsworth. ISBN 978-93-86650-93-1.
- Harper, Craig A. (March 19, 2020). "Ideological measurement in social and personality psychological science". PsyArXiv. doi:10.31234/osf.io/wpsje. S2CID 236820824.
- Heaven, Patrick C. L.; Bucci, Sandra (January 2001). "Right-wing authoritarianism, social dominance orientation and personality: an analysis using the IPIP measure". European Journal of Personality. 15 (1): 49–56. doi:10.1002/per.389. ISSN 1099-0984. S2CID 145649835.
- Henry, PJ; Sidanius, Jim; Levin, Shana; Pratto, Felicia (August 2005). "Social Dominance Orientation, Authoritarianism, and Support for Intergroup Violence Between the Middle East and America". Political Psychology. 26 (4): 569–584. doi:10.1111/j.1467-9221.2005.00432.x.
- Ho, Arnold K.; Sidanius, Jim; Kteily, Nour; Sheehy-Skeffington, Jennifer; Pratto, Felicia; Henkel, Kristin E.; Foels, Rob; Stewart, Andrew L. (December 2015). "The nature of social dominance orientation: Theorizing and measuring preferences for intergroup inequality using the new SDO_{7} scale". Journal of Personality and Social Psychology. 109 (6): 1003–1028. doi:10.1037/pspi0000033. PMID 26479362. S2CID 2587257.
- Hodson, Gordon; Hogg, Sarah M.; MacInnis, Cara C. (August 2009). "The role of "dark personalities" (narcissism, Machiavellianism, psychopathy), Big Five personality factors, and ideology in explaining prejudice". Journal of Research in Personality. 43 (4): 686–690. doi:10.1016/j.jrp.2009.02.005.
- Kemmelmeier, Markus (April 2005). "The Effects of Race and Social Dominance Orientation in Simulated Juror Decision Making". Journal of Applied Social Psychology. 35 (5): 1030–1045. doi:10.1111/j.1559-1816.2005.tb02158.x.
- Kleppestø, Thomas Haarklau; et al. (2019). "Correlations between social dominance orientation and political attitudes reflect common genetic underpinnings". PNAS. 116 (36): 17741–17746. Bibcode:2019PNAS..11617741K. doi:10.1073/pnas.1818711116. PMC 6731660. PMID 31431527.
- Kleppestø, Thomas Haarklau; Eftedal, Nikolai; Thomsen, Lotte (March 20, 2021). "Social Dominance Orientation (SDO)". In Shackelford, Todd Kennedy; Weekes-Shackelford, Viviana A. (eds.). Encyclopedia of Evolutionary Psychological Science. Switzerland: Springer Nature. doi:10.1007/978-3-319-16999-6_2602-1. hdl:10852/86043. ISBN 978-3-319-16999-6.
- Kteily, Nour S.; Sheehy-Skeffington, Jennifer; Ho, Arnold K. (May 2016). "Hierarchy in the eye of the beholder:(Anti-) egalitarianism shapes perceived levels of social inequality". Journal of Personality and Social Psychology. 112 (1): 136–159. doi:10.1037/pspp0000097. PMID 27124377. S2CID 3414744.
- Levin, S.; Federico, C. M.; Sidanius, J.; Rabinowitz, J. L. (2002). "Social Dominance Orientation and Intergroup Bias: The Legitimation of Favoritism for High-Status Groups". Personality and Social Psychology Bulletin. 28 (2): 144–57. doi:10.1177/0146167202282002. S2CID 143816344.
- Ligneul, Romain; Girard, Romuald; Dreher, Jean-Claude (April 2017). "Social brains and divides: the interplay between social dominance orientation and the neural sensitivity to hierarchical ranks". Scientific Reports. 7 45920. Bibcode:2017NatSR...745920L. doi:10.1038/srep45920. PMC 5381105. PMID 28378784.
- Lucas, Brian J.; Kteily, Nour S. (December 2017). "(Anti-) egalitarianism differentially predicts empathy for members of advantaged versus disadvantaged groups". Journal of Personality and Social Psychology. 114 (5): 665–692. doi:10.1037/pspa0000112. PMID 29672102. S2CID 4973008.
- Mast, Marianne S. (2002). "Dominance as Expressed and Inferred Through Speaking Time". Human Communication Research. 28 (3): 420–450. doi:10.1111/j.1468-2958.2002.tb00814.x.
- Mast, Marianne S. (2002b). "Female Dominance Hierarchies: Are They Any Different from Males'?". Personality and Social Psychology Bulletin. 28: 29–39. doi:10.1177/0146167202281003. S2CID 145108183.
- Perry, Ryan; Sibley, Chris G. (January 2012). "Big-Five personality prospectively predicts Social Dominance Orientation and Right-Wing Authoritarianism". Personality and Individual Differences. 52 (1): 3–8. doi:10.1016/j.paid.2011.08.009.
- Ponce de Leon, Rebecca; Kay, Aaron (May 2021). "Ironic Egalitarianism: When hierarchy-attenuating motives increase hierarchy-enhancing beliefs". Organizational Behavior and Human Decision Processes. 164: 86–101. doi:10.1016/j.obhdp.2021.02.006. S2CID 233581971.
- Pratto, Felicia; Sidanius, Jim; Stallworth, Lisa M.; Malle, Bertram F. (1994). "Social Dominance Orientation: A Personality Variable Predicting Social and Political Attitudes" (PDF). Journal of Personality and Social Psychology. 67 (4): 741–763. doi:10.1037/0022-3514.67.4.741 – via Digital Access to Scholarship at Harvard.
- Pratto, Felicia; Stallworth, Lisa M.; Sidanius, Jim (1997). "The gender gap: Differences in political attitudes and social dominance orientation". British Journal of Social Psychology. 36: 49–68. doi:10.1111/j.2044-8309.1997.tb01118.x. PMID 9114484.
- Pratto, Felicia; Hegarty, Peter (January 2000). "The Political Psychology of Reproductive Strategies". Psychological Science. 11 (1): 57–62. doi:10.1111/1467-9280.00215. ISSN 0956-7976. PMID 11228844. S2CID 30322297.
- Pratto, Felicia; Cidam, A. L.; Zeineddine, F. B.; Aranda, M.; Aiello, A.; Henkel, K. E. (September 2013). "Social dominance in context and in individuals: Contextual moderation of robust effects of social dominance orientation in 15 languages and 20 countries" (PDF). Social Psychological and Personality Science. 4 (5): 587–599. doi:10.1177/1948550612473663. hdl:10871/19142. S2CID 146613494.
- Reyna, Christine (2017). "Scale Creation, Use, and Misuse". In Crawford, Jarret T.; Jussim, Lee (eds.). Politics of Social Psychology. Frontiers of social psychology. New York: Taylor & Francis. ISBN 978-1-315-11261-9.
- Reynolds, Tania; Zhu, Luke; Aquino, Karl; Strejcek, Brendan (July 2020). "Dual pathways to bias: Evaluators' ideology and ressentiment independently predict racial discrimination in hiring contexts". Journal of Applied Psychology. 106 (4): 624–641. doi:10.1037/apl0000804. PMID 32614205. S2CID 220306461.
- Rios, Kimberly; Ybarra, Oscar (October 2009). "Symbolic threat and social dominance among liberals and conservatives: SDO reflects conformity to political values". European Journal of Social Psychology. 39 (6): 1039–1052. doi:10.1002/ejsp.606. hdl:2027.42/63589.
- Rubin, Mark; Hewstone, Miles (2004). "Social Identity, System Justification, and Social Dominance: Commentary on Reicher, Jost et al., and Sidanius et al". Political Psychology. 25 (6): 823–44. doi:10.1111/j.1467-9221.2004.00400.x. hdl:1959.13/27347.
- Sibley, Chris G.; Robertson, Andrew; Wilson, Marc S. (2006). "Social Dominance Orientation and Right-Wing Authoritarianism: Additive and Interactive Effects". Political Psychology. 27 (5): 755–68. doi:10.1111/j.1467-9221.2006.00531.x. JSTOR 3792537.
- Sibley, Chris G.; Duckitt, John (2008-08-01). "Personality and Prejudice: A Meta-Analysis and Theoretical Review". Personality and Social Psychology Review. 12 (3): 248–279. doi:10.1177/1088868308319226. ISSN 1088-8683. PMID 18641385. S2CID 5156899.
- Sibley, Chris G.; Bergh, Robin; Satherley, Nicole; Osborne, Danny; Milojev, Petar; Greaves, Lara M.; Huang, Yanshu; Townrow, Carly; Faapoi, Amy; Yogeeswaran, Kumar; Hawi, Diala; Duckitt, John (2019). "Profiling authoritarian leaders and followers". TPM: Testing, Psychometrics, Methodology in Applied Psychology. 23 (3): 401–417. doi:10.4473/TPM26.3.6.
- Sidanius, James (1993). "The psychology of group conflict and the dynamics of oppression: A social dominance perspective". In Iyengar, Shanto; McGuire, William James (eds.). Explorations in political psychology. Duke studies in political psychology. Duke University Press. pp. 183–219. ISBN 978-0-8223-1324-3.
- Sidanius, Jim; Pratto, Felicia; Bobo, Lawrence (1994). "Social dominance orientation and the political psychology of gender: A case of invariance?". Journal of Personality and Social Psychology. 67 (6): 998–1011. doi:10.1037/0022-3514.67.6.998.
- Sidanius, Jim; Pratto, Felicia; Bobo, Lawrence (1996). "Racism, conservatism, Affirmative Action, and intellectual sophistication: A matter of principled conservatism or group dominance?". Journal of Personality and Social Psychology. 70 (3): 476–90. doi:10.1037/0022-3514.70.3.476.
- Sidanius, Jim; Pratto, Felicia (1999). Social Dominance: An Intergroup Theory of Social Hierarchy and Oppression. Cambridge: Cambridge University Press. ISBN 978-0-521-80540-7.
- Sidanius, Jim; Levin, Shana; Federico, Christopher M.; Pratt, Felicia (2001). "Legitimizing Ideologies: The Social Dominance Approach". In Jost, John T.; Major, Brenda (eds.). The Psychology of Legitimacy: Emerging Perspectives on Ideology, Justice, and Intergroup Relations. Cambridge University Press. pp. 307–31. ISBN 978-0-521-78699-7.
- Sidanius, Jim; Kteily, Nour; Sheehy-Skeffington, Jennifer; Ho, Arnold K.; Sibley, Chris; Duriez, Bart (2013-06-01). "You're Inferior and Not Worth Our Concern: The Interface Between Empathy and Social Dominance Orientation". Journal of Personality. 81 (3): 313–323. doi:10.1111/jopy.12008. ISSN 1467-6494. PMID 23072294.
- Sidanius, James; Roso, Adriane (December 2020). "Social dominance theory: introducing professor Jim Sidanius to the Brazilian social psychology community". Psicologia & Sociedade. 32 e224657. doi:10.1590/1807-0310/2020v32224657. S2CID 235035401. "The SDO scale is not trying to separate "good" people from "bad" people, or "enlightened" people from "unenlightened" people, it is really important to distinguish people who like high hierarchy and propose hierarchy, from people who don't like high hierarchy. It is sort of used to differentiate between people who want to see hierarchical group relations versus equalitarian group relations. But hierarchical versus egalitarian group relations have no moral implications. (...). You cannot give people the SDO scale and then say to them "you are a bad person", or "you are sick", or "you are inadequate".""
- Stanley, Samantha Kay (May 2019). Clarifying the nature of the association between social dominance orientation and environmentalism (PhD). Australian National University.
- Waldfogel, Hannah B.; Sheehy-Skeffington, Jennifer; Hauser, Oliver P.; Ho, Arnold K. (April 2021). "Ideology selectively shapes attention to inequality". Proceedings of the National Academy of Sciences. 118 (14) e2023985118. Bibcode:2021PNAS..11823985W. doi:10.1073/pnas.2023985118. PMC 8040796. PMID 33795517.
- Wu, Wei; Tan, Chenhao; Luo, Xinmin; Wang, Pei (April 2019). "Social Dominance Orientation and Stereotype Influence Perception Of Social Distance Between Classes". Social Behavior and Personality. 47 (4): 1–8. doi:10.2224/sbp.5990. S2CID 150805871.
- Yogeeswaran, Kumar; Davies, Thomas; Sibley, Chris G. (July 2016). "Janus-faced nature of colorblindness: Social dominance orientation moderates the relationship between colorblindness and outgroup attitudes: Colorblindness and SDO". European Journal of Social Psychology. 47 (4): 509–516. doi:10.1002/ejsp.2225. S2CID 148235317.
