= Moi les hommes, je les déteste =

2020 essay by Pauline Harmange

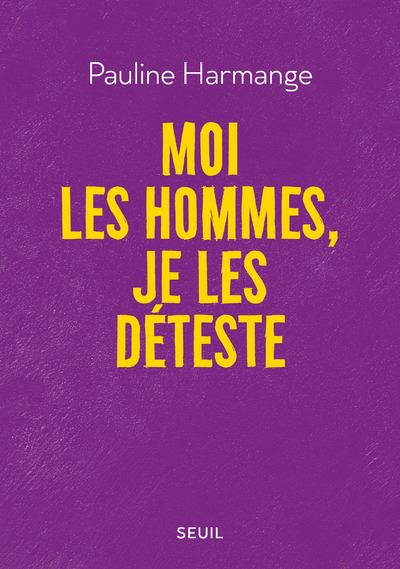
- Author: Pauline Harmange
- Language: French
- Subject: Gender politics, feminism
- Genre: Essay
- Publisher: Monstrograph; Éditions du Seuil; HarperCollins
- Publication date: 2020
- Publication place: France
- English publication date: 2021
- Media type: Print, e-book

Moi les hommes, je les déteste (English: I Hate Men) is a feminist essay by the French activist and blogger Pauline Harmange. It was published in 2020, initially by the independent publishing house Monstrograph, and later by a major publishing company, Éditions du Seuil.

== Synopsis ==
The essay argues that shunning men is a legitimate defense against widespread misogyny. Harmange writes that misandry, or the hatred of men, "exists only as a reaction to misogyny, which is at the root of systemic violence". Citing statistics showing that in 2018, men made up 96% of those convicted of domestic violence and 99% of those convicted of sexual violence, Hermange argues that in contrast to misogyny, "misandry has never killed anyone".

In the 96-page booklet, Harmange aims to "understand misandry and to give it back the right to exist." According to her, feminists have always needed to pretend not to hate men so as not to lose them as allies. But in her view, misandry is not only "perfectly justified, but also necessary". She advises women to reduce their relationships with men and toxic masculinity, in order to rediscover the benefits of the "sisterhood" among women.

== Publication history ==
Non-profit publishing house Monstrograph issued the initial print run in August 2020. On the day of its publication, a government employee named Ralph Zurmély wrote to the publisher demanding a retraction of the essay.

According to French newspaper Mediapart, Zurmély, a special adviser to the Ministry of Women's Rights, threatened Monstrograph with criminal prosecution for "incitement to hatred on the grounds of gender". The publisher declined to withdraw the essay, telling the French media that the book was "an invitation not to force oneself to associate with men or to deal with them. At no time does the author incite violence". The Ministry of Women's Rights disavowed Zurmély's threats, with a spokesperson stating that minister delegate Élisabeth Moreno "firmly condemned this isolated act".

The essay became a cause célèbre in the French media, with the magazine Le Nouvel Obs calling the attempt at censorship an example of "cancel culture". The controversy led to skyrocketing demand for the book, which had initially been printed in only 400 copies. It was republished by a major publisher, Éditions du Seuil, in October 2020. Léa Védie, writing in the European Journal of Women's Studies, calls this an example of the Streisand effect. In 2021, HarperCollins released an English translation of the work by Natasha Lehrer, titled I Hate Men.
