= Monstrograph =

- Industry: Publishing
- Founded: May 18, 2018; 8 years ago
- Founders: Martin Page; Coline Pierré
- Defunct: November 13, 2022; 3 years ago
- Headquarters: Nantes, France
- Products: Books
- Website: colinepierre.fr/monstrograph

Monstrograph is a French publishing company founded by writers Martin Page and Coline Pierré in May 2018.

Monstrograph is perhaps best known as the publisher of the controversial Moi les hommes, je les déteste (also known as I Hate Men) a feminist essay by the French activist Pauline Harmange.
