= Tree of patriarchy =

Metaphor for the system of patriarchy

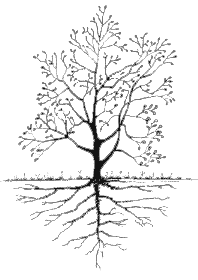
An illustration of the tree of patriarchy by Esther L. Danielson

The Tree of Patriarchy is a metaphor used to describe the system of patriarchy. It appears in Allan G. Johnson's The Gender Knot (1997), who borrowed the idea from R. Roosevelt Thomas Jr. (1991). The metaphor uses the parts of a tree to illustrate how patriarchy is shaped by and performs in society.

The roots of the tree illustrate the deep-seated nature of patriarchy in western society. Patriarchy finds it roots in the core principles of male dominance, centrism, and control. These values are rooted deeply and firmly within western society. We can see male dominance most primarily in the workplace – men dominate CEO positions, as well as upper-level government positions. The language that we use denotes a fixation on everything male. The gender dynamics that we experience everyday are shaped by deep-rooted male control (Johnson, 1997). The roots are also complex, showing that patriarchy is hard to untangle and remove (Johnson, 2013).

The trunk is a metaphor for the institutions within society that are shaped by and, in turn, support patriarchy. These institutions include education, politics, sciences, arts, and the economy (Johnson, 2013). These institutions are something in which we participate every day. The knowledge and language created within these realms permeates the way we view the world. These institutions are built on the roots of patriarchy, and are responsible for the reflection of these values onto broader society (Johnson, 2013).

The branches are the way in which individuals (represented by the leaves) interact with patriarchy. The branches affect our everyday lives and include communities, organizations, legal structures (such as marriage) and our families (ibid.). When we go to school, we learn about a patriarchal world view. When we work within the community and organizations we are expected to act a certain way. The leaves – individuals- are the result of the systems of patriarchy, and it is their activities that sustain the entire tree (Johnson, 1997).

The leaves on the tree are passive, and do not object to being a part of the tree. However, humans are not as passive as leaves. If individuals choose to separate themselves from the tree, then the whole system will lose its power and die (Johnson, 2013).

Johnson (1997, 2013) is careful to point out that breaking the links between patriarchy and individual is not as simple as it may seem in the tree metaphor, he simply wishes to illustrate that consciously stepping away from patriarchy is only the first step. In order to fully dismantle patriarchy, Johnson says it has to be dismantled at the roots where it is most complex. To do this, all who participate in society must question its foundations and the knowledge that shapes it (Smith, 2007).

The metaphor of the tree is not only useful in illustrating the patriarchal system, but in other systems of oppression as well, such as classism, racism, or ableism (Johnson, 2013).
