= Felicia Pratto =

American social psychologist

- Occupation: Professor of psychology

Academic background
- Education: Carnegie Mellon University, New York University

Felicia Pratto (born 1961) is a social psychologist known for her work on intergroup relations, dynamics of power, and social cognition. She is Professor of Psychological Sciences at the University of Connecticut. Pratto is a Fellow of the Association for Psychological Science.

Pratto is co-author, with Jim Sidanius, of Social Dominance: An Intergroup Theory of Social Hierarchy and Oppression. This book describes how societies are structured through group-based social hierarchies, and how societal structures lead to intergroup conflict, racism, classism, and patriarchy.

== Biography ==
Pratto grew up in Boulder, Colorado. She received her BA at Carnegie Mellon University in 1983, where she conducted research with Susan Fiske on people's conceptions about nuclear war. She continued her education at New York University where she received her Master of Arts degree in 1987 and her Ph.D. in psychology in 1988. Pratto was an associate professor of psychology at Stanford University from 1990 to 1997 prior to joining the Faculty of Psychology at the University of Connecticut.

== Research ==
Pratto has studied the processes and consequences of inequality, encompassing race and sex discrimination in hiring and workplace environments, prejudice against the LGBTQ community and immigrants, violations of International Humanitarian Law in wartime, terrorism and counterterrorism, and the Arab uprisings.

Pratto and her colleagues received the Morton Deutsch Conflict Resolution Award in 2008 for their co-authored paper "Power Dynamics in an Experimental Game", published in Social Justice Research. Their study examined relational and structural aspects of power dynamics and the emergence of inequalities as pairs of students played an interactive game.

Pratto was part of the research team awarded the Gordon Allport Prize in 2011 for their co-authored paper "Diversity Policy, Social Dominance, and Intergroup Relations: Predicting Prejudice in Changing Social and Political Contexts", published in Social Justice Research. This multinational study examined anti-Muslim prejudice across countries varying in social norms related to multiculturalism and assimilation.

In another multinational study, Pratto and her colleagues were awarded the Otto Klineberg Intercultural and Intergroup Relations Award in 2015 for their coauthored paper "International Support for the Arab Uprisings: Understanding Sympathetic Collective Action Using Theories of Social Dominance and Social Identity". This study used social identity theory and social dominance theory to account for sympathetic collective actions observed throughout the world in response to the Arab Spring.

Pratto uses a variety of research methods, including international surveys, comparative studies, interactive games in the laboratory, and field experiments. In collaboration with Oliver John, Pratto examined cognitive processes that direct attention towards negative stimuli that have the potential to adversely impact one's well-being. Her research with Peter Hegarty focused on social constructionism and group differences, with relevance to feminist psychology and lesbian and gay psychology.

== Representative publications ==
- Pratto, F.; Bargh, J. A. (1991). "Stereotyping Based on Apparently Individuating Information: Trait and Global Components of Sex Stereotypes Under Attention Overload". Journal of Experimental Social Psychology. 27 (1): 26–47. doi:10.1016/0022-1031(91)90009-u.
- Pratto, F.; John, O. P. (1991). "Automatic Vigilance: The Attention-grabbing Power of Negative Social Information". Journal of Personality and Social Psychology. 61 (3): 380–391. doi:10.1037/0022-3514.61.3.380. PMID 1941510.
- Pratto, F.; Sidanius, J.; Stallworth, L. M.; Malle, B. F. (1994). "Social Dominance Orientation: A Personality Variable Predicting Social and Political Attitudes". Journal of Personality and Social Psychology. 67 (4): 741–763. doi:10.1037/0022-3514.67.4.741.
- Sidanius, J.; Pratto, F.; Bobo, L. (1996). "Racism, Conservatism, Affirmative Action, and Intellectual Sophistication: A Matter of Principled Conservatism or Group Dominance?". Journal of Personality and Social Psychology. 70 (3): 476–490. doi:10.1037/0022-3514.70.3.476.
- Sidanius, J.; Pratto, F.; Van Laar, C.; Levin, S. (2004). "Social Dominance Theory: Its Agenda and Method". Political Psychology. 25 (6): 845–880. doi:10.1111/j.1467-9221.2004.00401.x.
- Pratto, F.; Sidanius, J.; Levin, S. (2006). "Social Dominance Theory and the Dynamics of Intergroup Relations: Taking Stock and Looking Forward". European Review of Social Psychology. 17 (1): 271–320. doi:10.1080/10463280601055772. S2CID 15052639.
- Pratto, F., Lee, I-C., Tan, J. Y., & Pitpitan, E. Y. (2011). Power Basis Theory: A Psychoecological Approach to Power. In D. Dunning (ed.), Frontiers of Social Psychology: Social Motivation (pp. 191–222). New York, US: Psychology Press.
