= Pauline Harmange =

French writer

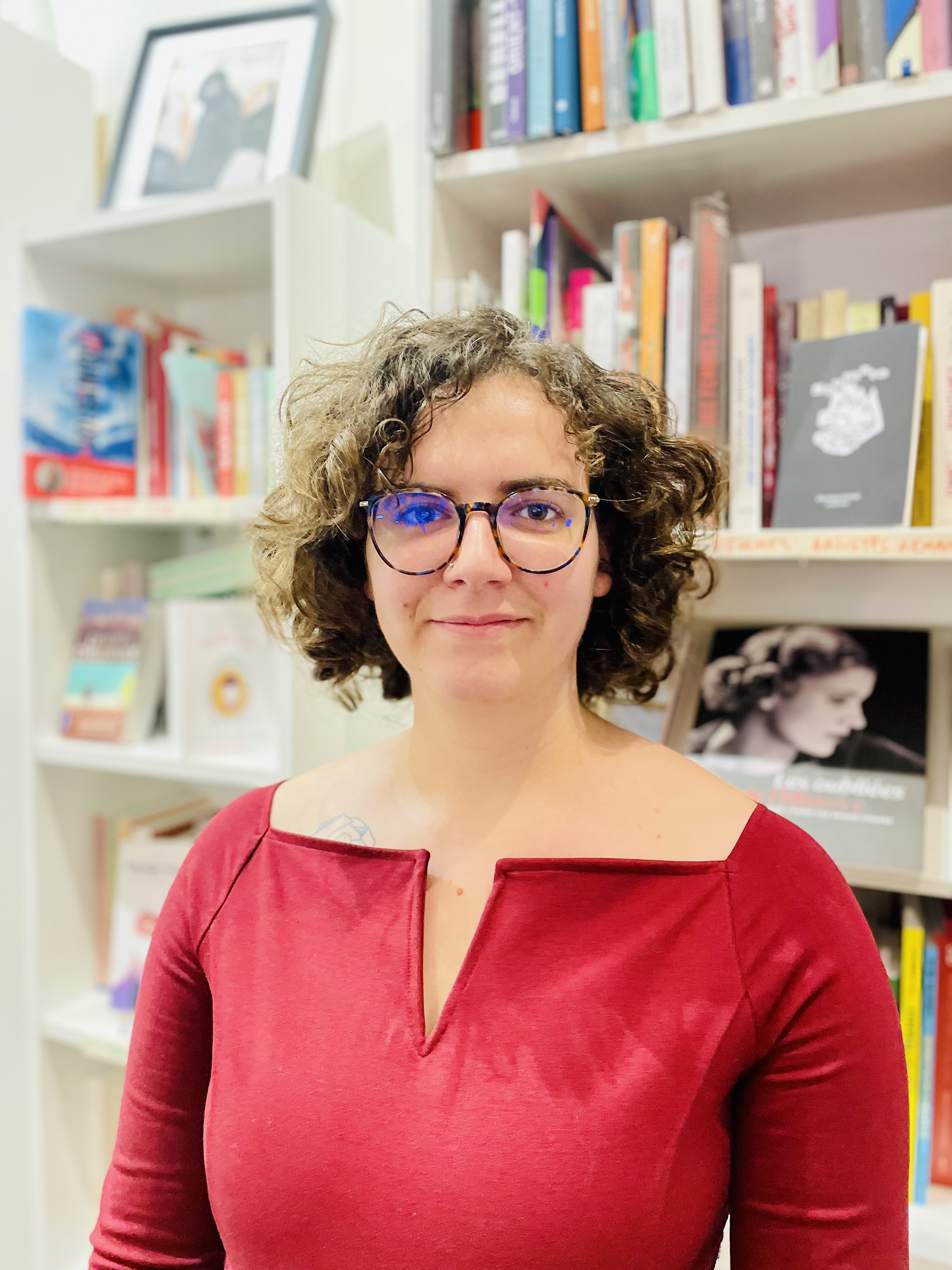
- Born: 1995 (age 30–31); France
- Citizenship: France
- Occupations: Feminist activist, writer
- Notable work: Moi les hommes, je les déteste (I Hate Men)

Pauline Harmange (born 1995) is a French feminist blogger and activist whose 96-page essay Moi les hommes, je les déteste (2020) (English: I Hate Men) became a media cause célèbre after a French government adviser attempted to censor its publication.

== I Hate Men ==
Originally intended as an edition of 400 by nonprofit publisher Monstrograph, the media attention caused the initial print run of Harmange's essay Moi les hommes, je les déteste to sell out, and 2,500 copies were sold within two weeks of its release. Monstrograph auctioned off the rights to reprint the essay, which were bought by French publisher Éditions du Seuil. The book has sold 20,000 copies as of 2021, along with translation rights for 17 languages.

The book was published in January 2021 in the U.S. as I Hate Men by HarperCollins.

== Early life ==
Harmange began blogging at age 15 and has published her writing to her website Un invincible été. She has also volunteered with L'Échappée, an association fighting against sexual violence.

== Selected publications ==
- I Hate Men. Translated by Natasha Lehrer. London: 4th Estate. 2020. ISBN 978-0-00-845758-7.
- Aux endroits brisés [In broken places] (in French). Paris: Fayard. 2021. ISBN 978-2-213-72095-1.
- Abortion: A Personal Story, a Political Choice. Translated by Caitlin O'Neil. Brunswick, Victoria, Australia: Scribe Publications. 2023. ISBN 978-1-957363-29-5.
- Le renard [The fox] (in French). Paris: JC Lattès. 2023. ISBN 978-2-7096-7073-9.
