= Tommy J. Curry =

American scholar

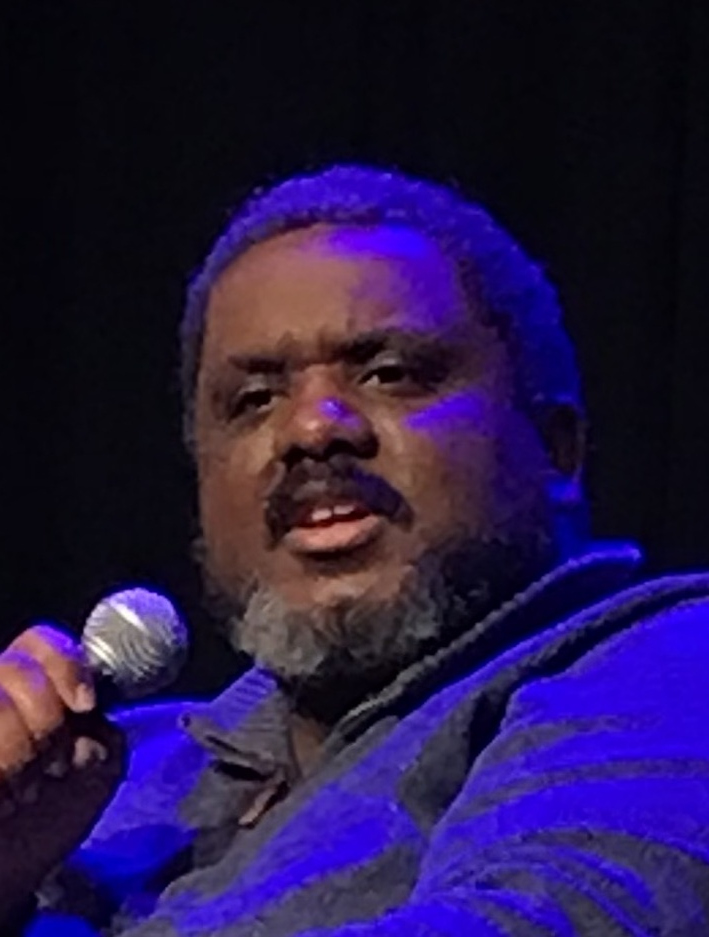
- Curry in November 2024

Academic background
- Education: DePaul University (MA); Southern Illinois University (PhD)

Academic work
- Discipline: Philosophy
- Sub-discipline: Africana philosophy and Black male studies
- Institutions: Texas A&M University, University of Edinburgh

Tommy J. Curry is an American scholar, author and professor of philosophy. As of 2019, he holds a Personal Chair in Africana philosophy and Black male studies at the University of Edinburgh. In 2018, he won an American Book Award for The Man-Not: Race, Class, Genre, and the Dilemmas of Black Manhood.

== Education ==
Curry received his master's degree at DePaul University in 2004, and his doctorate in philosophy from Southern Illinois University in 2009. His dissertation, Cast Upon the Shadows: Essays toward the Culturalogic Turn in Critical Race Theory, explored the political philosophy of Derrick Bell using only Black authors and theorists. His dissertation remains the only known work to have done this in the discipline of philosophy. In 2008–2009, Curry was a postdoctoral fellow at Penn State University in the Africana Research Center. His main research areas include critical race theory, Black male studies, and Africana philosophy.

== Career ==
Curry is the author of The Man-Not: Race, Class, Genre, and the Dilemmas of Black Manhood. In academic circles, The Man-Not is regarded as controversial for its discussion of the rape of Black males during American slavery by White men and women, its depiction of White feminism as the perfection of patriarchy and American imperialism, and the text's documenting of the rape and domestic abuse Black males suffer at the hands of Black men and women in their communities. However, ‘’The Man-Not’’ has received multiple positive reviews in Masculinity Studies, Black Studies, and Gender Studies journals. In August 2018, the Before Columbus Foundation announced that ‘’The Man-Not’’ would be awarded a 2018 American Book Award for its original contribution to American literature and thought. Curry's book argues for the creation of a new field of study looking at the experiences and historical development of racialized men and boys the world over. While numerous scholars from inside and outside of academia contributed to the foundations of Black Male Studies, Rasheed (2019) indicates that Curry could be considered the Father of Black Male Studies.

In 2018, Temple University Press made Curry editor of the Black Male Studies series which Curry has claimed is the first book series specifically dedicated to the study of Black men and boys and racialized males to ever be supported on a University Press.

Much of Curry's writing is based on combining social science research with philosophy and theory. He claims that many of the theories offered to explain the lives of Black Americans are not only incorrect but rely on outdated racist modes of thinking. As a scholar of Critical Race Theory, Curry's work focuses on the theories developed by racial realists like Derrick Bell, Richard Delgado, Jean Stefancic, and Kenneth Nunn. He argues that idealist strands of critical race theory are unable to account for the brutal realities of Black death and dying, poverty, and de facto segregation.

In 2017, Curry was targeted by alt-right and neo-Nazi websites for comments he had made on a 2012 podcast, comparing revolutionary violence and armed self-defense in the United States via Jamie Foxx's lead character in the film Django Unchained. According to Snopes and Curry's colleagues, his statements had been taken out of context. According to Al Jazeera, Curry's case was part of broader pattern of White supremacists targeting U.S. college campuses following the election of Donald Trump as president.

== Awards ==
In addition to the American Book Award, Curry has received several academic awards and honors for his research. In 2017, Curry was awarded the Alain Locke Award by the Society of American Philosophy for his public intellectual research and commentaries on anti-Black racism, the death and dying of Black males, and the rape of Black men and boys in the United States. His publications and national profile earned him recognition as one of the Top 15 Emerging Scholars of Color in the United States by Diverse Magazine in 2018. In 2020, his second monograph, Another white Man's Burden: Josiah Royce's Quest for a Philosophy of white Racial Empire, won the Josiah Royce Prize in American Idealist Thought from the Josiah Royce Society. In 2026, the British Philosophical Association recognized Tommy J. Curry's work on Black men and boys and racial justice with the Contribution of Research Outwith the Academy award.

== Works ==
- The Man-Not : Race, Class, Genre, and the Dilemmas of Black Manhood, Philadelphia, Pa. : Temple University Press, 2017. ISBN 9781439914878, OCLC 974487826
- Another white Man's Burden: Josiah Royce's Quest for a Philosophy of white Racial Empire, Albany, NY: SUNY Press, 2018. ISBN 9781438470726, OCLC 9920867174
