= Allan G. Johnson =

American sociologist (1946–2017)

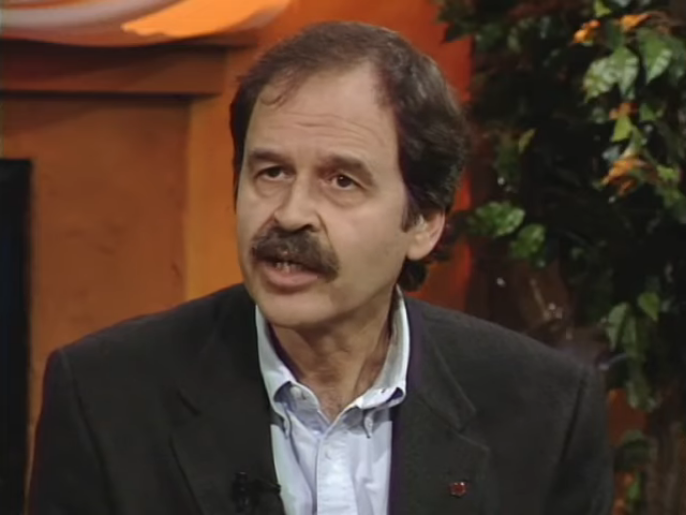
- Johnson at a 2003 video interview
- Born: Allan G. Johnson; 1946; Washington, DC, US
- Died: December 24, 2017 (aged 70–71)
- Education: PhD., Sociology
- Alma mater: Dartmouth College; University of Michigan
- Occupations: Author, Sociologist, Public Speaker
- Spouse: Nora L. Jamieson
- Writing career
- Genres: Sociology, fiction
- Notable works: The Gender Knot: Unraveling our Patriarchal Legacy; The Forest and the Trees: Sociology as Life, Practice, and Promise; Privilege, Power, and Difference; The First Thing and the Last; Not from Here
- Website: www.agjohnson.us

Allan G. Johnson (1946–2017) was an American writer and public speaker who worked in the fields of sociology and gender studies. One of his nonfiction works is The Gender Knot: Unraveling our Patriarchal Legacy, about the detrimental effects of the patriarchy.

== Biography ==
Allan G. Johnson was born in Washington, DC. He lived there until he was six years old, when he and his family moved to Oslo, Norway, for two years while his father served at the U.S. Embassy. When the family returned to the United States, they settled in Massachusetts.

Johnson earned his bachelor's degree in Sociology and English at Dartmouth College and his Ph.D. in Sociology at the University of Michigan. His dissertation focused on women's roles in Mexico City. After receiving his PhD, he worked at Wesleyan University in the sociology department. During this time, he published his first book, Social Statistics without Tears. After he left Wesleyan, he worked at Hartford College for Women, teaching sociology and women's studies. During this time, he wrote a number of books, including The Gender Knot and The Forest and the Trees: Sociology as Life, Practice, and Promise.

In 1995, Johnson began working as a corporate trainer and began doing freelance public speaking engagements after The Gender Knot was published. During this time, he began to publish novels, including The First Thing And The Last and Nothing Left to Lose. He died of lymphoma in 2017.

== Bibliography ==
- Social Statistics without Tears (1977)
- Human arrangements: An introduction to sociology, 4th edition 1996)
- The forest for the trees: An introduction to sociological thinking (1997)
- The Gender Knot: Unraveling our Patriarchal Legacy, 3rd edition (2014)
- Privilege, Power, and Difference, 3rd edition (2017)
- The Blackwell Dictionary Of Sociology: A User's Guide To Sociological Language, 2nd Edition (2005)
- Nothing Left to Lose (2012)
- The First Thing and the Last (2010)
- The Forest and the Trees: Sociology as Life, Practice, and Promise, 3rd edition (2014)
- Not from Here: A Memoir (2015)
