= Social dominance theory =

Theory of intergroup relations

Social dominance theory (SDT) is a social psychological theory of intergroup relations that examines the caste-like features of group-based social hierarchies, and how these hierarchies remain stable and perpetuate themselves. According to the theory, group-based inequalities are maintained through three primary mechanisms: institutional discrimination, aggregated individual discrimination, and behavioral asymmetry. The theory proposes that widely shared cultural ideologies ("legitimizing myths") provide the moral and intellectual justification for these intergroup behaviors by serving to make privilege normal. For data collection and validation of predictions, the social dominance orientation (SDO) scale was composed to measure acceptance of and desire for group-based social hierarchy, which was assessed through two factors: support for group-based dominance and generalized opposition to equality, regardless of the ingroup's position in the power structure.

The theory was initially proposed in 1992 by social psychology researchers Jim Sidanius, Erik Devereux, and Felicia Pratto. It observes that human social groups consist of distinctly different group-based social hierarchies in societies that are capable of producing economic surpluses. These hierarchies have a trimorphic (three-form) structure, a description which was simplified from the four-part biosocial structure identified by van den Berghe (1978). The hierarchies are based on: age (i.e., adults have more power and higher status than children), gender (i.e., men have more power and higher status than women), and arbitrary-set, which are group-based hierarchies that are culturally defined and do not necessarily exist in all societies. Such arbitrariness can select on ethnicity (e.g., in the US, Bosnia, Asia, Rwanda), class, caste, religion (Sunni versus Shia Islam), nationality, or any other socially constructed category. Social hierarchy is not only seen as a universal human feature – SDT argues there is substantial evidence it is shared, including the theorized trimorphic structure – among apes and other primates.

== Personal level ==
According to researchers, individuals who score high on the psychological tendency known as social dominance orientation are more likely to support discriminatory policies and the hierarchical organization of the social world. Individuals with high levels of social dominance orientation are also more inclined to endorse ideologies such as racism, sexism, homophobia, nationalism, and militarism. Theorists argue that social dominance orientation is a psychological tendency that has developed through evolutionary processes and is present, to varying degrees, in all individuals.

== Group hierarchy ==
Social dominance theory (SDT) argues that all human societies form group-based hierarchies. A social hierarchy is where some individuals receive greater prestige, power or wealth than others. A group-based hierarchy is distinct from an individual-based hierarchy in that the former is based on a socially constructed group such as race, ethnicity, religion, social class and freedoms, linguistic group, etc. while the latter is based on inherited, athletic or leadership ability, high intelligence, artistic abilities, etc.

A primary assumption in social dominance theory (SDT) is that racism, sexism, nationalism, and classism are all manifestations of the same human disposition to form group-based social hierarchies. The social tiers described by multiple intersectional theories of stratification become organized into hierarchies due to forces that SDT believes are best explained in evolutionary psychology to offer high survival value. Human social hierarchies are seen to consist of a hegemonic group at the top and negative reference groups at the bottom. More powerful social roles are increasingly likely to be occupied by a hegemonic group member (for example, an older white male). Males are more dominant than females, and they possess more political power and occupy higher status positions illustrating the iron law of androcracy. As a role gets more powerful, Putnam's law of increasing disproportion becomes applicable and the probability the role is occupied by a hegemonic group member increases.

SDT adds new theoretical elements attempting a comprehensive synthesis of explanations of the three mechanisms of group hierarchy oppression that are regulated by legitimizing myths:

- Aggregated individual discrimination (ordinary discrimination)
- Aggregated institutional discrimination (by governmental and business institutions)
  - State terrorism (e.g., police violence, death squads)
- Behavioural asymmetry
  - Deference–systematic outgroup favouritism (minorities favour members of dominant group)
  - asymmetric ingroup bias (as status increases, in-group favoritism decreases)
  - self-handicapping (self-categorization as an inferior becomes a self-fulfilling prophecy)
  - ideological asymmetry (as status increases, so do beliefs legitimizing and/or enhancing the current social hierarchy)

Although the nature of these hierarchical differences and inequality differs across cultures and societies, significant commonalities have been verified empirically using the social dominance orientation (SDO) scale. In multiple studies across countries, the SDO scale has been shown to correlate robustly with a variety of group prejudices (including sexism, sexual orientation prejudice, racism, nationalism) and with hierarchy-enhancing policies.

Social dominance theory also emphasizes that group-based hierarchies are closely tied to the distribution of resources, opportunities, and social status within a society. These hierarchies tend to privilege dominant groups while systematically disadvantaging subordinate groups, often in ways that are not explicitly recognized or acknowledged. As a result, individuals may experience unequal access to education, healthcare, and economic opportunities depending on their position within the social structure.

The theory further suggests that these hierarchical divisions are influenced by a variety of social categories, including race, gender, religion, age, and economic status. These categories shape how individuals are grouped within society and determine their relative access to power and privilege. Importantly, such hierarchies are not always consciously constructed, but may instead emerge through long-standing social practices and cultural norms.

Another key aspect highlighted in the literature is that social dominance hierarchies are nearly universal across human societies, although their specific forms and determining factors may vary depending on cultural and historical context. This universality suggests that hierarchical organization is a recurring feature of social systems, even though the criteria for dominance differ across societies.

Additionally, the theory draws attention to the role of social structures in maintaining inequality over time. Once established, hierarchies can shape individuals' life trajectories by influencing their perceived social status, access to resources, and opportunities for upward mobility. This process contributes to the persistence of inequality and reinforces existing social divisions across generations.

=== Behavioural asymmetry ===
According to the theory, group-based inequalities are also shaped by interactions between groups. Behavioural asymmetry refers to the tendency of members of dominant and subordinate groups to exhibit different patterns of behaviour, which can facilitate greater access to resources for dominant groups. Several forms of behavioural asymmetry have been identified. Asymmetric ingroup bias reflects the tendency of dominant group members to favour their own group more strongly than subordinate group members. In some cases, members of subordinate groups may even display outgroup favouritism toward dominant groups.

Another mechanism associated with subordinate groups is self-handicapping behaviours, which may contribute to the maintenance of inequality. These include behaviours such as substance use, intragroup violence, or engagement in unlawful activities that may harm the ingroup. Such behaviours can reinforce existing stereotypes directed at subordinate groups.

Finally, members of dominant groups are more likely to adopt ideologies, beliefs, attitudes, and behaviours that support the maintenance of hierarchical systems. All else being equal, they are also more likely to score higher on social dominance orientation, which facilitates the continuation of social hierarchies in their favour. This process is referred to as ideological asymmetry.

== Legitimizing myths theory ==
SDT believes that decisions and behaviors of individuals and groups can be better understood by examining the "myths" that guide and motivate them. Legitimizing myths are consensually held values, attitudes, beliefs, stereotypes, conspiracy theories, and cultural ideologies. Examples include the inalienable rights of man, divine right of kings, the protestant work ethic, and national myths. In current society, such legitimizing myths or narratives are communicated through platforms like social media, television shows, and films, and are investigated using a variety of methods including content analysis, semiotics, discourse analysis, and psychoanalysis. The granularity of narrative extends from broad ideologies at the highest level to middle level personal myths (positive thinking of oneself as a successful smart dominant, or submissive inferior), reaching the lowest level of behavioral scripts or schemas for particular dominant-submissive social situations. Categories of myth include:

- paternalistic myths (the dominant hegemony serves society, looks after incapable minorities)
- reciprocal myths (suggestions that dominants and outgroups are actually equal)
- sacred myths (karma or divine right of kings as a religion-approved mandate to dominate others)

For regulation of the three mechanisms of group hierarchy oppression, there are two functional types of legitimizing myths: hierarchy-enhancing and hierarchy-attenuating myths. Hierarchy-enhancing ideologies (e.g., racism or meritocracy) contribute to greater levels of group-based inequality. Felicia Pratto presented meritocracy as an example of a legitimizing myth, and how the myth of meritocracy produces only an illusion of fairness. Hierarchy-attenuating ideologies such as protected rights, universalism, egalitarianism, feminism, and multiculturalism contribute to greater levels of group-based equality. People endorse these different forms of ideologies based in part on their psychological orientation to accept or reject unequal group relations as measured by the SDO scale. People who score higher on the SDO scale tend to endorse hierarchy-enhancing ideologies, and people who score lower tend to endorse hierarchy-attenuating ideologies. Finally, SDT proposes that the relative counterbalance of hierarchy-enhancing and -attenuating social forces stabilizes group-based inequality.

== Interactions with authoritarian personality theory ==
Authoritarian personality theory has an empirical scale known as the RWA measure, which strongly predicts a substantially similar set of group level sociopolitical behaviors such as prejudice and ethnocentrism that the SDO scale predicts, despite the scales being largely independent of each other. Research by Bob Altemeyer and others has shown the two scales have different patterns of correlation with characteristics at the individual level and other social phenomena. For example, high-SDO individuals are not particularly religious, but high-RWAs usually are; high-SDOs do not claim to be benevolent but high RWAs usually do. Altemeyer theorizes that both are authoritarian personality measures, with SDO measuring dominant authorial personalities, and RWA measuring the submissive type. Other researchers believe that the debate between intergroup relation theories has moved past which theory can subsume all others or better explain all forms discrimination. Instead, the debate has moved to pluralist explanation, where researchers need to determine which theory or combination of theories is appropriate under which conditions.

The relationship between the two theories has been explored by Altemeyer and other researchers such as John Duckitt, who have exploited the greater coverage possible by employing RWA and SDO scales in tandem. Duckitt proposes a model in which RWA and SDO influences ingroup and outgroup attitudes in two different dimensions: RWA measures the threats to norms and values, so high RWA scores reliably predicts negative views towards drug dealers and rock stars, while high SDO scores do not. The model theorizes that high SDO individuals react to pecking order competition with groups seen as socially subordinate (unemployment beneficiaries, housewives, handicapped), and view them negatively, whereas RWA does not show any correlation. Duckitt's research observed that RWA and SDO measures can become more correlated with age, and suggests the hypothesis that the perspectives were acquired independently during socialization and over time become more consistent as they interact with each other. Unaffectionate socialization is hypothesized to cause tough-minded attitudes of high-SDO individuals. Duckitt believes this competitive response dimension in believes the world operates on a survival of the fittest scheme is backed by multiple studies. He predicts that the high correlation between the views of the world as dangerous and competitive emerge from parenting styles tending to covariance along the dimensions of punitiveness and lack of affection.

The model also suggests that these views mutually reinforce each other. Duckitt examined the complexities of the interaction between RWA, SDO, and a variety of specific ideological/prejudicial beliefs and behavior. For instance:

- SDO beliefs are activated by competition and intergroup inequalities in status and power
- RWA is a stronger predictor of prejudice when the outgroup is threatening
- When group status is unstable, SDO is associated with higher ingroup bias than when group status is stable
- Outgroup liking is best predicted by similarity to the ingroup, while outgroup respect is predicted by status and technological advancement

Duckitt also argued that this model may explain anti-authoritarian-libertarian and egalitarian-altruistic ideologies.

Other researchers view RWA and SDO as distinct. People high on the RWA scale are easily frightened and value security, but are not necessarily callous, cruel, and confident as those that score high on the SDO scale. Altemeyer has conducted multiple studies, which suggest that the SDO measure is more predictive of racist orientation than the RWA measure, and that while results from the two scales correlate closely for some countries (Belgium and Germany), his research and McFarland and Adelson's show they correlate very little for others (USA and Canada).

== Gender and dominance ==
Because patriarchal societies are dominated by males over females, SDT predicts that everything else being equal, males tend to have a higher SDO score. This "invariance hypothesis" predicts that males will tend to function as hierarchy enforcers; that is, they are more likely to carry out acts of discrimination, such as the systematic terror by police officers, and the extreme example of death squads and concentration camps. The hypothesis is supported by a demonstrated correlation between SDO scores and preference for occupations such as criminal prosecutors and police officers, as opposed to hierarchy-attenuating professions (social workers, human rights advocates, or health care workers). SDT also predicts that males who carry out violent acts have been predisposed out of a conditioning called prepared learning.

== Elite theory influences – Marx and others ==
SDT was influenced by the elite theories of Karl Marx, Gaetano Mosca, Robert Michels, and Vilfredo Pareto, all of whom argue that societies are ruled by a small elite who rationalize their power through some system of justifying narratives and ideologies. Marx described the oppressive hierarchy of hegemonic groups dominating negative reference groups; in his examples the bourgeoisie (owning class) dominate the proletariat (working class) by controlling capital (the means of production) and not paying workers enough. However, Marx thought that the working class would eventually comprehend the solution to this oppression and destroy the bourgeoisie in a proletarian revolution. Friedrich Engels viewed ideology and social discourse as employed to keep dominants and subgroups in line, referring to this as "false consciousness", whose political rationalist cure results when masses can evaluate the facts of their situation. SDT believes that social constructions employing ideology and social narratives may be used as effective justifications regardless of whether they are epistemologically true or false, or whether they legitimize inequality or equality. From the Marxian economic determinist perspective, race, ethnic, and gender conflict are sociological epiphenomena derivable from the primary economic class conflict. Unlike Marxian sociologists, SDT along with Mosca, Michels, and Pareto together reject reductionism solely to economic causes, and are skeptical of the hoped for class revolution. Pareto's analysis was that "victory" in the class struggle would only usher in a new set of socially dominant elites. Departing from elite theory's near exclusive focus on social structures manipulated by rational actors, SDT follows Pareto's new direction towards examining collective psychological forces, asserting that human behavior is not primarily driven by either reason or logic.

== Criticisms ==
John C. Turner and Katherine J. Reynolds from the Australian National University published in the British Journal of Social Psychology a commentary on SDT, which outlined six fundamental criticisms based on internal inconsistencies: arguing against the evolutionary basis of the social dominance drive, questioning the origins of social conflict (hardwired versus social structure), questioning the meaning and role of the SDO construct, a falsification of behavioral asymmetry, the idea of an alternative to understanding attitudes to power including ideological asymmetry and collective self-interest, and a reductionism and philosophical idealism of SDT. The commentary argues that social identity theory (SIT) has better explanatory power than SDT, and made the case that SDT has been falsified by two studies: Schmitt, Branscombe, and Kappen (2003) and Wilson and Liu (2003).

Wilson and Liu suggested intergroup attitudes follow social structure and cultural beliefs, theories, and ideologies developed to make sense of group's place in the social structure and the nature of their relationships with other groups; from this view, SDO is a product rather than a cause of social life. They questioned the invariance hypothesis, and cited their own test relating "strength of gender identification" as a moderator of "gender‐social dominance orientation relationship", reporting that group identification was associated with increased dominance orientation in males but decreased dominance orientation in females. Pratto, Sidanius and Levin denied that any claim was made that SDO measures are independent of social identity context, and that methodologically, "it would obviously make no sense to compare the SDO levels of female members of death squads to those of male social workers, or, less dramatically, to compare the SDO levels of men identifying with female gender roles to those of women identifying with male gender roles". The hypothesized evolutionary predispositions of one gender towards SDO was not intended by the SDT authors to imply that nothing can be done about gender inequality or domination patterns, and that the theory provides unique approaches for attenuating those predispositions and their social manifestations.

Liu and Wilson (2003), conducted research to examine the role of gender in comparison to levels of social dominance orientation. The study conducted two tests looking at the relationship between gender-social dominate orientation and if it's moderated by strength of gender group identification and found, "strength of gender identification was found to moderate the gender‐SDO relationship, such that increasing group identification was associated with increasing SDO scores for males, and decreasing SDO for females." Therefore this study raised questions about gender as group membership and if it's a different status compared to other group memberships, possibly undermining the theoretical basis of SDT.

== See also ==
- Collective narcissism
- Common ingroup identity
- Cultural hegemony
- Elite theory
- Habitus (sociology)
- Noble lie
- Political psychology
- Power (social and political)
- Social constructionism
- Social psychology
- System justification theory

== Bibliography ==
=== Books ===
- Altemeyer, Bob (1998). "The other "authoritarian personality"". In Zanna, Mark P. (ed.). Advances in Experimental Psychology. Vol. 30. Academic Press. ISBN 978-0-12-015230-8.
- Duckitt, John (2000). "Culture, Personality and Prejudice". In Renshon, Stanley; Duckitt, John (eds.). Political Psychology: Cultural and Cross-cultural Foundations. Palgrave Macmillan. doi:10.1057/9780230598744. ISBN 978-0-333-75104-6.
- Durkheim, Emile (1993) [1893]. The Division of Labour in Society. Translated by Simpson, G. New York: MacMillan.
- Gramsci, Antonio (1971). Selections from the Prison Notebooks of Antonio Gramsci. Translated by Nowell-Smith, Geoffrey. International Publishers. ISBN 978-0-7178-0397-2.
- Johnson, Walton (1994). "Ideological dominance". Dismantling apartheid: A South African town in transition. Cornell University Press. p. 156. ISBN 978-1-5017-2183-0. "There are myths of origin, myths of European and African culture, and myth embodied in popular stereotypes."
- Moscovici, Serge (1984). "The Phenomenon of Social Representations". In Farr, R. M. (ed.). Social Representations- European studies in social psychology. Cambridge University Press. pp. 3–69. ISBN 978-2-7351-0066-8.
- Putnam, Robert D. (1976). The Comparative Study of Political Elites. New Jersey: Prentice Hall. p. 33. ISBN 0-13-154195-1.
- Sanday, Peggy (1981). Female Power and Male Dominance: On the Origins of Sexual Inequality. Cambridge University Press. p. 295. ISBN 978-0-521-28075-4.
- Sidanius, Jim; Pratto, Felicia (1999). Social Dominance: An Intergroup Theory of Social Hierarchy and Oppression. Cambridge: Cambridge University Press. ISBN 978-0-521-62290-5.
- Sidanius, Jim; Pratto, Felicia (2004). "Social Dominance Theory: A New Synthesis". In Jost, John T. (ed.). Political Psychology: Key Readings in Political Psychology. Psychology Press. doi:10.4324/9780203505984. ISBN 978-1-84169-069-8.
- van Dijk, Teun (1989). Communicating Racism: Ethnic Prejudice in Thought and Talk. Newbury Park, Calif: Sage. p. 437. ISBN 978-0-8039-3627-0.

=== Articles ===
- Golec de Zavala, Agnieszka; Cichocka, Aleksandra; Eidelson, Roy; Jayawickreme, Nuwan (2009). "Collective Narcissism and Its Social Consequences" (PDF). Journal of Personality and Social Psychology. 97 (6): 1074–96. doi:10.1037/a0016904. PMID 19968420. Archived from the original (PDF) on 2018-03-24.
- Duckitt, John; Sibley, Chris (2007-03-01). "Right Wing authoritarianism, social dominance orientation and the dimensions of generalized prejudice". European Journal of Personality. 21 (2). Wiley InterScience: 113–130. doi:10.1002/per.614. S2CID 146128801.
- Duckitt, John; Sibley, Chris (2010-04-04). "Right-Wing Authoritarianism and Social Dominance Orientation differentially moderate intergroup effects on prejudice". European Journal of Personality. 24 (7). Wiley Online Library: 583–601. doi:10.1002/per.772. S2CID 144931495.
- Imhoff, Roland; Bruder, Martin (2014). "Speaking (Un-)Truth to Power: Conspiracy Mentality as a Generalised Political Attitude". European Journal of Personality. 28 (28): 25–43. doi:10.1002/per.1930. S2CID 145583638.
- Lewis, Rebecca J. (June 2002). "Beyond Dominance: The Importance of Leverage". The Quarterly Review of Biology. 77 (2): 149–64. doi:10.1086/343899. JSTOR 343899. PMID 12089769. S2CID 20747279.
- McFarland, Sam; Adelson, Sherman (July 1996). "An omnibus study of personality, values, and prejudice". 19th Annual Scientific Meeting of the International Society of Political Psychology Vancouver, British Columbia, Canada.
- Ohman, Arne; Mineka, Susan (2001). "Fears, Phobias, and Preparedness: Toward an Evolved Module of Fear and Fear Learning" (PDF). Psychological Review. 108 (3): 483–522. doi:10.1037/0033-295X.108.3.483. PMID 11488376.
- Pratto, Felicia; Sidanius, James; Stallworth, Lisa; Malle, Bertram (1994). "Social Dominance Orientation: A Personality Variable Predicting Social and Political Attitudes" (PDF). Journal of Personality and Social Psychology. 67 (4): 741–763. doi:10.1037/0022-3514.67.4.741 – via Harvard University DASH repository.
- Pratto, Felicia; Stallworth, Lisa M.; Sidanius, Jim; Siers, Bret (1997). "The gender gap in occupational role attainment: A social dominance approach". Journal of Personality and Social Psychology. 72 (1): 37–53. doi:10.1037/0022-3514.72.1.37. PMID 9008373.
- Pratto, F.; Sidanius, J.; Levin, S. (2006). "Social dominance theory and the dynamics of intergroup relations: Taking stock and looking forward". European Review of Social Psychology. 17 (1): 271–320. doi:10.1080/10463280601055772. S2CID 15052639.
- Pratto, Felicia; Stewart, Andrew L. (19 March 2012). "Group Dominance and the Half-Blindness of Privilege". Journal of Social Issues. 68 (1): 28–45. doi:10.1111/j.1540-4560.2011.01734.x.
- Rubin, Mark; Hewstone, Miles (2004). "Social Identity, System Justification, and Social Dominance: Commentary on Reicher, Jost et al., and Sidanius et al". Political Psychology. 25 (6): 823–44. doi:10.1111/j.1467-9221.2004.00400.x. hdl:1959.13/27347.
- Susemihl, Geneviève (2013). "What myths are communicated in literature and through media, Internet and blogs" (PDF). In Last, David (ed.). Eliciting Hierarchy-Enhancing Legitimizing Myths (Report). Centre for Security, Armed Forces and Society, Royal Military College of Canada. p. 133.
- Sidanius, Jim; Pratto, Felicia; Devereux, Erik (1992). "A Comparison of Symbolic Racism Theory and Social Dominance Theory as Explanations for Racial Policy Attitudes". The Journal of Social Psychology. 132 (3): 377–395. doi:10.1080/00224545.1992.9924713.
- Turner, John C.; Reynolds, Katherine J. (2003). "Why Social Dominance Theory Has Been Falsified". British Journal of Social Psychology. 42 (2): 199–206. doi:10.1348/014466603322127184. PMID 12869242.
- Wilson, Marc S.; Liu, James H. (2003). "Social dominance orientation and gender: The moderating role of gender identity". British Journal of Social Psychology. 42 (2): 187–198. doi:10.1348/014466603322127175. PMID 12869241.
