= Jim Sidanius =

Psychologist and academic

James H. Sidanius, known as Jim Sidanius (born James Brown on December 11, 1945 - June 29, 2021) was an American psychologist and academic. He served as John Lindsley Professor of Psychology in memory of William James and of African and African American Studies at Harvard University. He won the 2006 Harold Lasswell Award for "Distinguished Scientific Contribution in the Field of Political Psychology" from the International Society of Political Psychology and the Society for Personality and Social Psychology 2013 Career Contribution Award. He was inducted into the American Academy of Arts and Sciences in 2007. The Society of Experimental Social Psychology awarded Sidanius the Scientific Impact Award in 2019.

== Life ==
Sidanius, who was of African American heritage, grew up in New York City. He earned a bachelor's degree in psychology from City College of New York in 1968. He went on to pursue a Ph.D. in psychology at the University of Stockholm, Sweden. His dissertation, passed in 1977, was titled: "Cognitive functioning and Socio-political Ideology: Studies in political psychology." He changed his last name from Brown to Sidanius upon moving to Sweden (where he also obtained citizenship), but returned to the United States in the 1980s as a permanent resident. He was married twice.

== Books ==
- Social Dominance: An Intergroup Theory of Social Hierarchy and Oppression with Felicia Pratto (1999, Cambridge University Press)
- Racialized Politics: Values, Ideology, and Prejudice in American Public Opinion (2000, University of Chicago Press)
- Key Readings in Political Psychology (2004, Psychology Press)
- The Diversity Challenge: Social Identity and Intergroup Relations on the College Campus (2010, Russell Sage)

== See also ==
- Social dominance theory
