= Patriarchy =

Social system dominated by men

Patriarchy is a social system in which positions of authority are primarily held by men. The term patriarchy is used both in anthropology to describe a family or clan controlled by the father or eldest male or group of males, and in feminist theory to describe a broader social structure in which men as a group dominate society.

Sociologists posit that the process of socialization is predominantly responsible for the establishment of gender roles. They contend that gender roles and gender inequity function as instruments of power and have evolved into social norms that serve to maintain control over women. Patriarchal ideology explains and rationalizes patriarchy by attributing gender inequality to inherent natural differences between men and women, divine commandment, or other fixed structures.

Patriarchy has manifested itself throughout history in the social, legal, political, religious, and economic organization of a range of different cultures. Most contemporary societies are generally patriarchal in practice.

== Terminology ==
Patriarchy literally means "the rule of the father" and comes from the Greek πατριάρχης (patriarkhēs), "father or chief of a race", which is a compound of πατριά (patria), "lineage, descent, family, fatherland" (from πατήρ patēr, "father") and ἀρχή (arkhē), "domination, authority, sovereignty".

Historically, the term patriarchy has been used to refer to autocratic rule by the male head of a family; however, since the late 20th century it has also been used to refer to social systems in which power is primarily held by adult men. The term was particularly used by writers associated with second-wave feminism such as Kate Millett; these writers sought to use an understanding of patriarchal social relations to liberate women from male domination. This concept of patriarchy was developed to explain male dominance as a social, rather than biological, phenomenon.

== Overview ==
Patriarchy is a social system in which the primary positions of authority are held by men, in the areas of political leadership, moral authority and control of property. Sociologist Sylvia Walby defines patriarchy as "a system of social structures and practices in which men dominate, oppress, and exploit women". Social stratification along gender lines, with power predominantly held by men, has been observed in most, but not all societies. The concept of patriarchy is also related to patrilineality in an anthropological sense, although not exclusively.

== History ==
=== Prehistory ===
Some preconditions for the eventual development of patriarchy were the emergence of increased paternal investment in the offspring, also referred to as fatherhood, and of a sexual division of labour. Several researchers have stated that the first signs of a sexual division of labour dates from around 2 million years ago, deep within humanity's evolutionary past. It has been connected to an evolutionary process during a period of resource scarcity in Africa approximately 2 million years ago. British primatologist Richard Wrangham suggests that the origin of the division of labor between males and females may have originated with the invention of cooking, which is estimated to have happened simultaneously with humans gaining control of fire between 1 and 2 million years ago. The idea was proposed early on by Friedrich Engels in an unfinished essay from 1876.

Anthropological, archaeological and evolutionary psychological evidence suggests that most prehistoric societies were relatively egalitarian, and suggests that patriarchal social structures did not develop until after the end of the Pleistocene epoch, following social and technological developments such as agriculture and domestication. According to Robert M. Strozier, historical research has not yet found a specific "initiating event". Historian Gerda Lerner asserts in her 1986 book The Creation of Patriarchy that there was no single event, and documents that patriarchy as a social system arose in different parts of the world at different times. Some scholars point to social and technological events, notably the emergence of agriculture, about six thousand years ago (4000 BCE).

Marxist theory, as articulated mainly by Friedrich Engels in The Origin of the Family, Private Property and the State (1884), assigns the origin of patriarchy to the emergence of private property, which has traditionally been controlled by men. In this view, men directed household production and sought to control women in order to ensure the passing of family property to their own (male) offspring, while women were limited to household labor and producing children. Lerner disputes this idea, arguing that patriarchy emerged before the development of class-based society and the concept of private property.

Domination by men of women is found in the Ancient Near East as far back as 3100 BCE, as are restrictions on a woman's reproductive capacity and exclusion from "the process of representing or the construction of history". According to some researchers, with the appearance of the Hebrews, there is also "the exclusion of woman from the God-humanity covenant".

The archaeologist Marija Gimbutas argues that waves of kurgan-building invaders from the Ukrainian steppes into the early agricultural cultures of Old Europe in the Aegean, the Balkans and southern Italy instituted male hierarchies that led to the rise of patriarchy in Western society. Steven Taylor argues that the rise of patriarchal domination was associated with the appearance of socially stratified hierarchical polities, institutionalised violence and the separated individuated ego associated with a period of climatic stress.

=== Ancient history ===
A prominent Greek general Meno, in the Platonic dialogue of the same name, sums up the prevailing sentiment in Classical Greece about the respective virtues of men and women. He says:

First of all, if you take the virtue of a man, it is easily stated that a man's virtue is this—that he be competent to manage the affairs of his city, and to manage them so as to benefit his friends and harm his enemies, and to take care to avoid suffering harm himself. Or take a woman's virtue: there is no difficulty in describing it as the duty of ordering the house well, looking after the property indoors, and obeying her husband.

— Meno, Plato in Twelve Volumes

The works of Aristotle portrayed women as morally, intellectually, and physically inferior to men; saw women as the property of men; claimed that women's role in society was to reproduce and to serve men in the household; and saw male domination of women as natural and virtuous.

Not all ancient Greek thinkers believed that women were inferior. Aristotle's teacher Plato laid out his vision of the most just society in his work Republic. In it, Plato argues that women would have complete educational and political equality in such a society, and would serve in the military. The Pythagoreans also valued the participation of women, who were treated as intellectual equals.

Lerner states that Aristotle believed that women had colder blood than men, which made women not evolve into men, the sex that Aristotle believed to be perfect and superior. Maryanne Cline Horowitz stated that Aristotle believed that "soul contributes the form and model of creation". This implies that any imperfection that is caused in the world must be caused by a woman because one cannot acquire an imperfection from perfection (which he perceived as male). Aristotle had a hierarchical ruling structure in his theories. Lerner claims that through this patriarchal belief system, passed down generation to generation, people have been conditioned to believe that men are superior to women. These symbols are benchmarks which children learn about when they grow up, and the cycle of patriarchy continues much past the Greeks.

As for Egypt, Herodotus left a record of his shock at the contrast between the roles of Egyptian women and the women of Athens. He observed that Egyptian women attended market and were employed in trade. In ancient Egypt, middle-class women were eligible to sit on a local tribunal, engage in real estate transactions, and inherit or bequeath property. Women also secured loans, and witnessed legal documents. Athenian women were denied such rights.

Greek influence spread, however, with the conquests of Alexander the Great, who was educated by Aristotle.

In ancient Japan, power in society was more evenly distributed, particularly in the religious domain, where Shintoism worships the goddess Amaterasu, and ancient writings were replete with references to great priestesses and magicians. However, at the time contemporary with Constantine in the West, "the emperor of Japan changed Japanese modes of worship", giving supremacy to male deities and suppressing belief in female spiritual power in what feminist scholars in the field of religious studies have called a "patriarchal revolution."

In ancient China, gender roles and patriarchy were shaped by Confucianism. Adopted as the official religion in the Han dynasty, Confucianism has strong dictates regarding the behavior of women, declaring a woman's place in society, as well as outlining virtuous behavior. Three Obediences and Four Virtues, a Confucian text, places a woman's value on her loyalty and obedience. It explains that an obedient woman is to obey their father before her marriage, her husband after marriage, and her first son if widowed, and that a virtuous woman must practice sexual propriety, proper speech, modest appearance, and hard work. Ban Zhao, a Confucian disciple, writes in her book Precepts for Women that a woman's primary concern is to subordinate themselves before patriarchal figures, such as a husband or father, and that they need not concern themselves with intelligence or talent. Ban Zhao is considered by some historians as an early champion for women's education in China; however, her extensive writing on the value of a woman's mediocrity and servile behavior leaves others feeling that this narrative is the result of a misplaced desire to cast her in a contemporary feminist light. Similarly to Three Obediences and Four Virtues, Precepts for Women was meant as a moral guide for proper feminine behavior, and was widely accepted as such for centuries.

=== Modern history ===
Although many 16th- and 17th-century theorists agreed with Aristotle's views concerning the place of women in society, none of them tried to prove political obligation on the basis of the patriarchal family until sometime after 1680. The patriarchal political theory is closely associated with Sir Robert Filmer. Sometime before 1653, Filmer completed a work entitled Patriarcha. However, it was not published until after his death. In it, he defended the divine right of kings as having title inherited from Adam, the first man of the human species, according to Judeo-Christian-Islamic tradition.

However, in the latter half of the 18th century, clerical sentiments of patriarchy were meeting challenges from intellectual authorities – Diderot's Encyclopédie denies inheritance of paternal authority stating, "... reason shows us that mothers have rights and authority equal to those of fathers; for the obligations imposed on children originate equally from the mother and the father, as both are equally responsible for bringing them into the world. Thus the positive laws of God that relate to the obedience of children join the father and the mother without any differentiation; both possess a kind of ascendancy and jurisdiction over their children...."

In the 19th century, various women began to question the commonly accepted patriarchal interpretation of Christian scripture. Quaker Sarah Grimké voiced skepticism about the ability of men to translate and interpret passages relating to the roles of the sexes without bias. She proposed alternative translations and interpretations of passages relating to women, and she applied historical and cultural criticism to a number of verses, arguing that their admonitions applied to specific historical situations, and were not to be viewed as universal commands.

In China's Ming dynasty, widowed women were expected to never remarry, and unmarried women were expected to remain chaste for the duration of their lives. Biographies of Exemplary Women, a book containing biographies of women who lived according to the Confucian ideals of virtuous womanhood, popularized an entire genre of similar writing during the Ming dynasty. Women who lived according to this Neo-Confucian ideal were celebrated in official documents, and some had structures erected in their honor.

In China's Qing dynasty, laws governing morality, sexuality, and gender-relations continued to be based on Confucian teachings. Men and women were both subject to strict laws regarding sexual behavior, however men were punished infrequently in comparison to women. Additionally, women's punishment often carried strong social stigma, "rendering [women] unmarriageable", a stigma which did not follow men. Similarly, in the People's Republic of China, laws governing morality which were written as egalitarian were selectively enforced favoring men, with insufficient enforcement against female infanticide in various areas, while infanticide of any form was, by the letter of the law, prohibited.

The treatment of women by the Taliban is considered by scholars a contemporary example of patriarchy.

== Social theories ==
Sociologists tend to reject predominantly biological explanations of patriarchy and contend that socialization processes are primarily responsible for establishing gender roles. According to standard sociological theory, patriarchy is the result of sociological constructions that are passed down from generation to generation. These constructions are most pronounced in societies with traditional cultures and less economic development. Even in modern, developed societies, however, gender messages conveyed by family, mass media, and other institutions largely favor males having a dominant status.

Although pseudoscientific theories of biological determinism have been presented in order to give these social explanations a scientific appearance, "the periods over which women would have been at a physiological disadvantage in participation in hunting through being at a late stage of pregnancy or early stage of child-rearing would have been short". During the time of the nomads, patriarchy still grew with power. Lewontin and others argue that such biological determinism unjustly limits women. In his study, he states women behave a certain way not because they are biologically inclined to, but rather because they are judged by "how well they conform to the stereotypical local image of femininity". According to Lewotin, gendered biases, rather than being justified by biology, are social constructs that get perpetuated and enforced across generations by those who benefit from them. For instance, biological traits specific to women, such as menopause and their ability to get pregnant, have the science surrounding them distorted and used against them as an attribute of weakness.

Sociologist Sylvia Walby has composed six overlapping structures that define patriarchy and that take different forms in different cultures and different times:

1. The household: women are more likely to have their labor expropriated by their husbands such as through housework and raising children
2. Paid work: women are likely to be paid less and face exclusion from paid work
3. The state: women are unlikely to have formal power and representation
4. Violence: women are more prone to being abused
5. Sexuality: women's sexuality is more likely to be treated negatively
6. Culture: representation of women in different cultural contexts

The idea that patriarchy is natural has, however, come under attack from many sociologists, explaining that patriarchy evolved due to historical, rather than biological, conditions. In technologically simple societies, men's greater physical strength and women's common experience of pregnancy combined to sustain patriarchy. Gradually, technological advances, especially industrial machinery, diminished the primacy of physical strength in everyday life. Introduction of household appliances reduced the amount of manual labor needed in the households. Similarly, contraception has given women control over their reproductive cycle.

Fundamentalist interpretations of Islam have been attributed to observed patriarchical patterns in some Muslim-majority countries.

=== Patriarchy and feminism ===
Patriarchy generally falls under two categories, "traditional patriarchy" and "structural patriarchy" (Pierik). Traditional patriarchy refers to the idea that the father is the head of the household and is at the top of families' social hierarchies. This patriarchal structure is most apparent in the American representation of a nuclear family; the father works and brings home an income while the mother takes care of the children and the household. This economic power dynamic in the home typically places the desires of the man/father/husband as priority over the desires of the woman/mother/wife.

Structural patriarchy expands the range of this social hierarchy outside of just the home and family dynamic. The typical influence that men hold in the home is extended to their social and professional positions. Women are often considered the caretakers of the workplace when in a professional setting while men do the labor. This dynamic can be seen in an office setting, with men as sources of income for the business and women in roles as secretaries to care for the workplace. This system leans into the idea that men are typically placed in higher-power positions in society due to the traditional role of a financial provider, and women fall into caretaker roles.

Elizabeth Cady Stanton used Grimké's criticism of biblical sources to establish a basis for feminist thought. She published The Woman's Bible, which proposed a feminist reading of the Old and New Testament. This tendency was enlarged by feminist theory, which denounced the patriarchal Judeo-Christian tradition. In 2020, social theorist and theologian Elaine Storkey retold the stories of thirty biblical women in her book Women in a Patriarchal World and applied the challenges they faced to women today. Working from both the Hebrew Scriptures and the New Testament, she analysed different variations of patriarchy, and outlined the paradox of Rahab, a prostitute in the Old Testament who became a role-model in the New Testament Epistle of James, and Epistle to the Hebrews. In his essay "A Judicial Patriarchy: Family Law at the Turn of the Century", Michael Grossberg coined the phrase "judicial patriarchy", stating that "The judge became the buffer between the family and the state", and that "Judicial patriarchs dominated family law because within these institutional and intraclass rivalries judges succeeded in protecting their power over the law governing the hearth."

The extended presence of patriarchal structures has led to the establishment of feminist ideals over centuries (Brunell). Several prominent fronts led to and continue to push the development of feminism; including paid and unpaid labor and expectations of gender roles (Thompson). Men are traditionally viewed as the breadwinners in a patriarchal society, and women are seen as homemakers. Formal job occupations outside of the home, traditionally carried out by men in a patriarchal society, are paid labor. Any work done inside of the home without financial compensation, traditionally carried out by women in patriarchal societies, is unpaid labor. The uneven financial compensation between these levels of labor is one of the factors that pushed feminist ideals forward.

== The role of patriarchy in feminism ==
With men being expected to bring home an income to support a family and the entire household, the strain of the increasing cost of living makes that ideal impractical. Because of this economic strain, many households rely on multiple incomes from both men and women. Despite the increase in 2-income households, the distribution of unpaid labor within the home remains unequal, with women performing more childcare, housework and invisible labor such as organization, planning, and caretaking of partners. A study of 23,088 mothers found that married and cohabitating mothers spent more time on housework and had less time for leisure and sleep than single mothers, suggesting that gendered expectations to perform the duties of a wife remain regardless of whether women also work outside the home.

=== Feminist ideologies ===
Feminism is not a direct opposition to patriarchy, it is a theory in response to patriarchy. Feminism focuses on the empowerment of women in society and the dismissal of traditional gender roles that are oppressive. Traditional female roles in the household are largely abandoned, and equal opportunity for women is the largest ideal that feminism stands with. Feminist theories believe that financial and social opportunities should be equally available for all.

This idea of the social division of gender roles as caretakers and providers being broken down is to allow for women to participate outside of caring for a home and children. Financial opportunity refers to employment pursuits, access to one's own finances, and wage equality for job positions that are available for both men and women.

=== Feminist theory ===
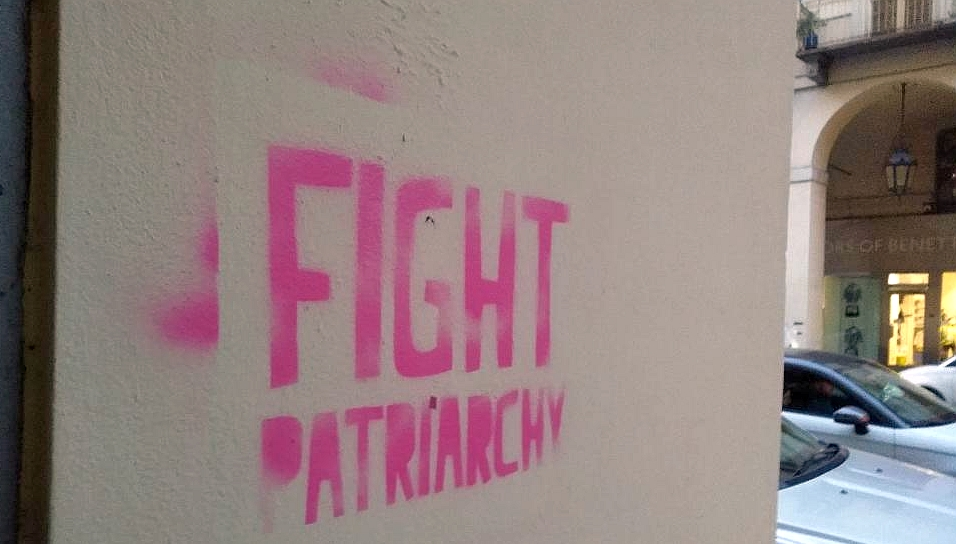
"FIGHT PATRIARCHY" – a graffito in Turin, Italy

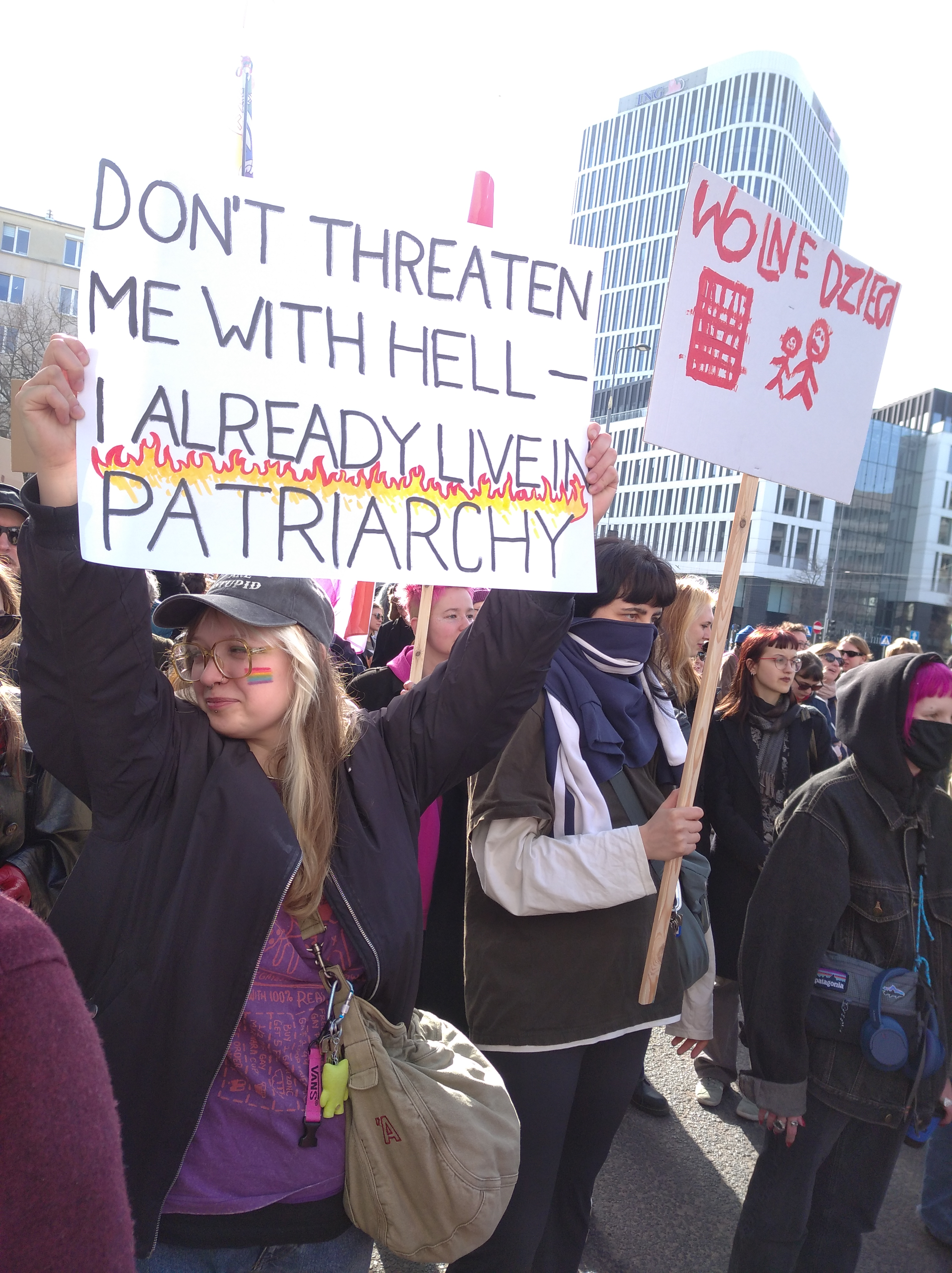
Slogan against patriarchy at the Warsaw demonstration in 2026.

Feminist theorists have written extensively about patriarchy either as a primary cause of women's oppression, or as part of an interactive system. Shulamith Firestone, a radical-libertarian feminist, defines patriarchy as a system of oppression of women. Firestone believes that patriarchy is caused by the biological inequalities between women and men, e.g. that women bear children, while men do not. Firestone writes that patriarchal ideologies support the oppression of women and gives as an example the joy of giving birth, which she labels a patriarchal myth. For Firestone, women must gain control over reproduction in order to be free from oppression. Feminist historian Gerda Lerner believes that male control over women's sexuality and reproductive functions is a fundamental cause and result of patriarchy.

Interactive systems theorists Iris Marion Young and Heidi Hartmann believe that patriarchy and capitalism interact together to oppress women. Young, Hartmann, and other socialist and Marxist feminists use the terms patriarchal capitalism or capitalist patriarchy to describe the interactive relationship of capitalism and patriarchy in producing and reproducing the oppression of women. According to Hartmann, the term patriarchy redirects the focus of oppression from the labour division to a moral and political responsibility liable directly to men as a gender. In its being both systematic and universal, therefore, the concept of patriarchy represents an adaptation of the Marxist concept of class and class struggle.

Lindsey German represents an outlier in this regard. German argued for a need to redefine the origins and sources of the patriarchy, describing the mainstream theories as providing "little understanding of how women's oppression and the nature of the family have changed historically. Nor is there much notion of how widely differing that oppression is from class to class." Instead, the patriarchy is not the result of men's oppression of women or sexism per se, with men not even identified as the main beneficiaries of such a system, but capital itself. As such, female liberation needs to begin "with an assessment of the material position of women in capitalist society." In that, German differs from Young or Hartmann by rejecting the notion ("eternal truth") that the patriarchy is at the root of female oppression.

Audre Lorde, an African American feminist writer and theorist, believed that racism and patriarchy were intertwined systems of oppression. Sara Ruddick, a philosopher who wrote about "good mothers" in the context of maternal ethics, describes the dilemma facing contemporary mothers who must train their children within a patriarchal system. She asks whether a "good mother" trains her son to be competitive, individualistic, and comfortable within the hierarchies of patriarchy, knowing that he may likely be economically successful but a mean person, or whether she resists patriarchal ideologies and socializes her son to be cooperative and communal but economically unsuccessful.

Lerner, in her 1986 book The Creation of Patriarchy, makes a series of arguments about the origins and reproduction of patriarchy as a system of oppression of women, and concludes that patriarchy is socially constructed and seen as natural and invisible.

Some feminist theorists believe that patriarchy is an unjust social system that is harmful to both men and women. It often includes any social, political, or economic mechanism that evokes male dominance over women. Because patriarchy is a social construction, it can be overcome by revealing and critically analyzing its manifestations.

Jaggar, Young, and Hartmann are among the feminist theorists who argue that the system of patriarchy should be completely overturned, especially the heteropatriarchal family, which they see as a necessary component of female oppression. The family not only serves as a representative of the greater civilization by pushing its own affiliates to change and obey, but performs as a component in the rule of the patriarchal state that rules its inhabitants with the head of the family.

Many feminists (especially scholars and activists) have called for culture repositioning as a method for deconstructing patriarchy. Culture repositioning relates to culture change. It involves the reconstruction of the cultural concept of a society. Prior to the widespread use of the term patriarchy, early feminists used male chauvinism and sexism to refer roughly to the same phenomenon. Author bell hooks argues that the new term identifies the ideological system itself (that men claim dominance and superiority to women) that can be believed and acted upon by either men or women, whereas the earlier terms imply only men act as oppressors of women.

Sociologist Joan Acker, analyzing the concept of patriarchy and the role that it has played in the development of feminist thought, says that seeing patriarchy as a "universal, trans-historical and trans-cultural phenomenon" where "women were everywhere oppressed by men in more or less the same ways […] tended toward a biological essentialism."

Anna Pollert has described use of the term patriarchy as circular and conflating description and explanation. She remarks the discourse on patriarchy creates a "theoretical impasse ... imposing a structural label on what it is supposed to explain" and therefore impoverishes the possibility of explaining gender inequalities.

== Biological theories ==
Studies of male sexual coercion and female resistance in nonhuman primates (for example, chimpanzees) suggest that sexual conflicts of interest underlying the patriarchy precede the emergence of the human species. However, the extent of male power over females varies greatly across different primate species. Among bonobos (a close relative of humans), for example, male coercion of females is rarely, if ever, observed, and bonobos are widely considered to be matriarchal in their social structure.

There is also considerable variation in the role that gender plays in human societies, and there is no academic consensus on to what extent biology determines human social structure. The Encyclopædia Britannica states that "many cultures bestow power preferentially on one sex or the other [...]." Some anthropologists, such as Floriana Ciccodicola, have argued that patriarchy is a cultural universal, and the masculinities scholar David Buchbinder suggests that Roland Barthes' description of the term ex-nomination, i.e. patriarchy as the 'norm' or common sense, is relevant. However, there do exist cultures that some anthropologists have described as matriarchal. Among the Mosuo (an ethnic group in Yunnan Province, China), for example, women exert greater power, authority, and control over decision-making. Other societies are matrilinear or matrilocal, primarily among indigenous tribal groups. Some hunter-gatherer groups, such as the !Kung of southern Africa, have been characterized as largely egalitarian.

Some proponents of the biological determinist understanding of patriarchy argue that because of human female biology, women are more fit to perform roles such as anonymous child-rearing at home, rather than high-profile decision-making roles, such as leaders in battles. Through this basis, "the existence of a sexual division of labor in primitive societies is a starting point as much for purely social accounts of the origins of patriarchy as for biological." Hence, the rise of patriarchy is recognized through this apparent "sexual division".

=== Evolutionary biology ===
An early theory in evolutionary biology, sometimes referred to as Bateman's principle, argues that females almost always invest more energy into producing offspring than males, and therefore, females are a limiting factor over which males of most species will compete. This idea suggests that females prefer males who control more resources that can help her and her offspring, which in turn causes an evolutionary pressure on males to be competitive with each other in order to gain resources and power.

Sociobiologist Steven Goldberg argues that social behavior is primarily determined by genetics, and thus that patriarchy arises more as a result of inherent biology than social conditioning. Goldberg contends that patriarchy is a universal feature of human culture. In 1973, Goldberg wrote, "The ethnographic studies of every society that has ever been observed explicitly state that these feelings were present, there is literally no variation at all." Goldberg has critics among anthropologists. Concerning Goldberg's claims about the "feelings of both men and women", Eleanor Leacock countered in 1974 that the data on women's attitudes are "sparse and contradictory", and that the data on male attitudes about male–female relations are "ambiguous". Also, the effects of colonialism on the cultures represented in the studies were not considered.

Anthropologist and psychologist Barbara Smuts argues that patriarchy evolved in humans through conflict between the respective reproductive interests of males and females. She lists six ways it may have emerged:

1. a reduction in female allies
2. elaboration of male-male alliances
3. increased male control over resources
4. increased hierarchy formation among men
5. female strategies that reinforce male control over females
6. the evolution of language and its power to create ideology.

== Psychoanalytic theories ==
While the term patriarchy often refers to male domination generally, another interpretation sees it as literally "rule of the father". So some people believe patriarchy does not refer simply to male power over women, but the expression of power dependent on age as well as gender, such as by older men over women, children, and younger men. Some of these younger men may inherit and therefore have a stake in continuing these conventions. Others may rebel.

This psychoanalytic model is based upon revisions of Freud's description of the normally neurotic family using the analogy of the story of Oedipus. Those who fall outside the Oedipal triad of mother/father/child are less subject to male authority.

The operations of power in such cases are usually enacted unconsciously. All are subject, even fathers are bound by its strictures. It is represented in unspoken traditions and conventions performed in everyday behaviors, customs, and habits. The triangular relationship of a father, a mother and an inheriting eldest son frequently form the dynamic and emotional narratives of popular culture and are enacted performatively in rituals of courtship and marriage. They provide conceptual models for organising power relations in spheres that have nothing to do with the family, for example, politics and business.

Arguing from this standpoint, radical feminist Shulamith Firestone wrote in her 1970 The Dialectic of Sex:

Marx was on to something more profound than he knew when he observed that the family contained within itself in embryo all the antagonisms that later develop on a wide scale within the society and the state. For unless revolution uproots the basic social organisation, the biological family – the vinculum through which the psychology of power can always be smuggled – the tapeworm of exploitation will never be annihilated.

== Gender inequality today ==
According to The United Nations, $6.4 trillion is the estimated annual requirement to achieve gender equality for critical sectors in 48 developing countries. This accounts for almost 70% of the world's population in developing countries. The President of the General Assembly, Dennis Francis emphasized the need to reverse the prediction of 340 million women in extreme poverty by 2030 due to the finding of one in every ten women currently living in extreme poverty. Women are also being targeted in places like Palestine, Ukraine, and Haiti, as he stated that credible evidence of sexual abuse was found. Sexual violence impacts individuals of all genders, though women are disproportionately affected. Additionally, most perpetrators are male, which some view as reinforcing traditional power structures associated with patriarchy.

Sima Bahouse, the Executive director of the United Nations Entity for Gender Equality and the Empowerment of Women, emphasized the urgent need to eliminate poverty for women and girls, advocating for inclusive fiscal policies that promote equitable redistribution and progressive taxation. Key priorities include enhancing public services and creating gender-responsive social protection systems that specifically benefit women and girls in poverty. Investing in the care economy is highlighted as essential for alleviating their poverty and fostering sustainable economic growth. The speaker rejected excuses about the difficulty or cost of these initiatives, asserting that a fair and sustainable future for all women and girls is achievable.

== Impact of patriarchy on mental health ==
The patriarchal framework of gender norms has established specific behavioral expectations for individuals according to their biological sex. Some individuals may not desire to adhere to the strict "acceptable behaviors" or gender boundaries set by society, which could be traumatic for some. These individuals are excluded and faced with alienation, making them more vulnerable to sexual violence. For example, LGBTQ+ members frequently fall victim to sexual abuse and harassment. Consequently, a patriarchal society creates an inherently unsafe and harmful environment for non-conforming women and those who do not adhere to rigid societal norms of gender and sexuality. While this power disparity is often perceived as primarily benefiting men, it also poses hidden risks to their psychological well-being.

With social media being very present today, individuals are increasingly susceptible to the negative impacts of patriarchy on their mental health. The internet has facilitated the spread of gender-based discrimination, reinforced patriarchal norms, and propagated negative representations of women. Research has shown that "social media use may be linked to adverse mental health effects, such as suicidal thoughts, feelings of loneliness, and reduced empathy".

== See also ==
=== Patriarchal models ===
- Biblical patriarchy
- Chinese patriarchy
- Domostroy
- Imperial House of Japan
- Pater familias
- Deme and genos

=== Related topics ===
- Machismo
- Matriarchy
- Androcentrism
- Anti-subordination principle
- Capitalist Patriarchy and the Case for Socialist Feminism
- La Cité antique (about anthropological patriachy)
- Correspondence principle (sociology)
- Family economics
- Hegemonic masculinity
- Homemaker
- Male expendability
- Nature versus nurture
- Patriarch (disambiguation)
- Patriarchate
- Patrician (ancient Rome)
- Patrilocal residence
- Phallocentrism
- Son preference
- Sociology of fatherhood
- The personal is political
- Tree of patriarchy
- Womb envy

=== Comparable social models ===
- Androcracy
- Dominator culture
- Kyriarchy
- Male privilege

=== Contrast ===
- Shared earning/shared parenting marriage
