= Diversity ideologies =

Associated with distinct effects on intergroup relations

Diversity ideology refers to individual beliefs regarding the nature of intergroup relations and how to improve them in culturally diverse societies. A large amount of scientific literature in social psychology studies diversity ideologies as prejudice reduction strategies, most commonly in the context of racial groups and interracial interactions. In research studies on the effects of diversity ideology, social psychologists have either examined endorsement of a diversity ideology as individual difference or used situational priming designs to activate the mindset of a particular diversity ideology. It is consistently shown that diversity ideologies influence how individuals perceive, judge and treat cultural outgroup members. Different diversity ideologies are associated with distinct effects on intergroup relations, such as stereotyping and prejudice, intergroup equality, and intergroup interactions from the perspectives of both majority and minority group members. Beyond intergroup consequences, diversity ideology also has implications on individual outcomes, such as whether people are open to cultural fusion and foreign ideas, which in turn predict creativity.

There are two major categories of diversity ideology that are frequently compared and contrasted with each other: colorblindness and multiculturalism. Both ideologies have been shown to have mixed effects on intergroup relations: in general, colorblind ideology is associated with lower stereotyping but greater prejudice, especially implicit prejudice. On the other hand, multicultural ideology is associated with greater stereotyping but reduced prejudice, including both implicit and explicit prejudice. The ideologies are differently accepted by majority and minority groups, and often lead to divergent outcomes for groups depending on their position in the social hierarchy. Besides the two most commonly studied diversity ideologies, there is another emerging ideology termed polyculturalism. Research suggests that polyculturalism has mostly positive implications for intergroup attitudes, but given the novelty of this ideology, further exploration of its full spectrum of effects is needed.

The supporters of diversity ideologies suggest that diversity and equality in the workforce, including at senior level, can increase company profits while providing morale and fairness, as Dr Miranda Brawn, diversity campaigner and founder of The Miranda Brawn Diversity Leadership Foundation have said.

== Colorblindness ==
In a colorblind ideological approach, “prejudice derives from people’s emphasis on superficial and irrelevant group categories (e.g., race), and therefore prejudice can be decreased by de-emphasizing group memberships” (p. 216). Therefore, colorblindness aims to address bias and reduce prejudice by neglecting all differences between social groups and avoiding drawing any distinction between people based on group categorizations. The ideology became prominent during the Civil Rights Movement in the 1960s. It was proposed as a strategy to eliminate blatant racism of Whites against Blacks in America. By explicitly recognizing that race does not and should not matter, colorblindness was intended to treat all races as identical, so that race could no longer be used as a basis to discriminate.

Colorblind ideology derives from classic social psychology research on group categorization. Social identity theory posits that people have a natural tendency to identify with groups based on common social identity, and due to the motivation to maintain positive distinctiveness, people display ingroup favoritism, i.e. giving preferential treatment to ingroup versus outgroup members in evaluations and behaviors. As a result, group categorization and affiliation is associated with the primary source of intergroup conflict, which leads to a lardy body of work studying how changing group boundaries, such as recategorizing or minimizing group membership can help reduce ingroup bias and promote intergroup harmony. This literature reflects the core value of colorblind ideology, i.e. de-emphasizing group memberships in order to improve intergroup attitudes.

=== Forms ===
Research has identified two forms of colorblindness, respectively focusing on group similarities and individual uniqueness. With the similarity approach, a common ingroup identity is emphasized, e.g. "We all belong to nation X." By stressing a superordinate identity that everyone across groups belongs to, the salience and importance of intergroup differences is downplayed. With the uniqueness approach, individual differences are emphasized. Each individual is seen as unique and contributes distinct values. When individual identity is underscored as the most valuable, no meaningful comparisons should be made based on group categorizations. However, research suggests that the uniqueness approach may not be effective because focusing on each individual's unique qualities in daily encounters is too cognitively taxing for people and can impair social interactions. At the same time, even if outgroup members' unique values are stressed, people tend to neglect stereotype-inconsistent information and when they do, they tend to categorize these outgroup members as subcategories and thus do not change perceived stereotypes of outgroups. Moreover, critics of colorblind ideology argue that it largely neglects people's need to affiliate and belong, especially for marginalized group members who have greater need to identify with their groups.

=== Distinction from assimilation ===
Assimilation refers to the belief that in order to promote intergroup harmony, minority groups should give up their group identities and adopt the dominant mainstream culture. The underlying idea is that if a society is culturally homogeneous, no prejudice could take place. However, this ideology may in itself reflect racism because it assumes the superiority of the majority group's culture while devaluing identities and cultures associated with minority groups.

Assimilation is often compared to colorblindness as an intergroup ideology. Some researchers contend that colorblindness is a similarly racist approach as assimilation because both require minority groups to forgo their group identity and devalue minority groups' meaningful traditions and cultures. On the other hand, other researchers argue that while assimilation promotes a unitary cultural ideal by the dominant standard and requests conformity and submission, colorblindness as a diversity ideology is intended to promote a larger whole with which everyone identifies and to facilitate equal treatment of majority and minority group members.

Research suggests that assimilation as an intergroup ideology is linked to higher social dominance orientation, or the tendency to support social hierarchy and anti-egalitarianism. It is associated with the most negative intergroup consequences, including greater stereotyping, more negative intergroup attitudes, and less support for liberal public policies promoting social equality for majority group members.

=== Effects ===
==== Acceptance by majority and minority groups ====
Although colorblindness is intended to be a hierarchy-attenuating ideology that promotes equal treatment of all social group members, it is differently accepted by majority and minority group members. Research shows that the adoption of colorblindness by majority groups is associated with external motivation to control prejudice as it serves the purpose of ego protection. When White participants were concerned about appearing biased or faced normative pressure, they were more likely to avoid talking about race or recognizing race differences, suggesting the strategic use of colorblindness to appear egalitarian. Colorblindness can also serve as a tool to defend the status quo by majority groups. When anti-egalitarian White participants were exposed to intergroup threat, they used colorblindness to rationalize inequality and legitimize the racial status quo. From a developmental perspective, children learn to avoid expressing racial prejudice and minimize racial categorization around age 10. On the other hand, minority groups tend to seek more identification with their minority group identities, which is not recognized by the colorblind ideology. Therefore, while White Americans have been shown to be more likely to endorse colorblind ideology, Black Americans are more likely to endorse multicultural ideology where their unique racial identity is acknowledged.

==== Stereotyping and prejudice ====
The effects of colorblind ideology on intergroup relations are mixed. In terms of stereotyping and prejudice, colorblindness is associated with decreased stereotyping of minority groups. People who are primed with colorblind ideology favor counterstereotypical minorities over stereotypical minorities. These findings suggest that colorblindness increases people's preference for individuals who display attributes atypical of their social groups and cross the group boundary. The colorblind ideology is also found to suppress expression of explicit prejudice in the short term, especially when intergroup conflict is high and more threat is triggered in the dominant group. However, implicit prejudice against minority groups rebounds at a later time point. The findings suggest that colorblindness may not reliably reduce prejudice, especially implicit prejudice, for sustained period of time.

==== Intergroup interactions ====
In terms of intergroup interactions, research suggests that colorblind ideology is associated with worse intergroup attitudes towards minority group members. Colorblindness promotes a prevention orientation in people as it emphasizes not harboring certain perception and performing certain behaviors. Therefore, trying to consciously suppressing bias against outgroups and negativity in intergroup interactions can impair majority group's cognitive ability and executive functions. As a result, inducing majority group members to adopt a colorblind ideology and to ignore racial differences in intergroup interactions, which leads them to consciously exert to appear non-prejudiced, can paradoxically increase their tendency to express more negative attitudes and discriminate against minority groups. Majority group members can exhibit more negative nonverbal behaviors and be perceived as less friendly by their minority interaction partners. Moreover, in some research colorblindness is linked with greater ethnocentrism and in-group favoritism, i.e. favoring ingroup members and perceiving them in more positive light than out-group members. However, there are also some studies finding that colorblindness decreases ethnocentrism.

From minority groups' perspective, evidence suggests that the adoption of colorblind ideology by majority group members also impairs minority performance and their perceived risk of discrimination. As a result, interacting with colorblind majority group members increases minority's cognitive taxation. This set of findings suggest that colorblindness may be more effective to address explicit bias than implicit unintentional bias in intergroup interactions between majority and minority groups.

==== Sensitivity to racism ====
Colorblindness is associated with reduced awareness of racism and sensitivity to microaggressions as well as reports of them among majority group members. In the educational setting, research suggests that in schools advocating for colorblind ideology, White teachers who deemed themselves as being fair still discriminated against Black students, giving Black students more severe punishments and favoring White students in class elections. Similarly, children who were exposed to the colorblind ideology were less likely to perceive race-biased behaviors as discriminatory. Therefore, while colorblindness takes the stance of facilitating egalitarianism, it may prevent racism from being recognized and addressed.

== Multiculturalism ==
In a multiculturalism ideology, “prejudice derives from a lack of knowledge of and respect for other groups” and prejudice can be decreased by learning about other groups and appreciating the differences (p. 220). Its focus is on embracing, appreciating and learning about and from differences between social groups in order to promote justice and equality, and to better improve the living conditions of minority group members. In contrast to colorblindness that advocates for neglecting differences and avoiding discussion of group categorization, multiculturalism states that minority groups' unique histories, traditions and pasts should be recognized and appreciated. Therefore, multiculturalism is commonly viewed as the competing ideology directly contrasting with colorblindness.

=== Forms ===
Three forms of multiculturalism are identified in social psychology research. First, the "important difference" form focuses on only recognizing that differences between groups exist and understanding the variety of perspectives, experiences and lives of different groups. Second, the "appreciate contributions" form emphasizes also the importance to appreciate each group's unique positive contribution and value to the diverse society. Lastly, the "maintain culture" form, directly in opposition to assimilation ideology, puts emphasis on paying attention to groups', especially newcomers to the society like immigrants, ability to maintain their unique identities and cultures. These forms are not mutually exclusive with each other, and many intergroup researchers study multiculturalism in some combined forms.

=== Effects ===
==== Intergroup attitudes and interactions ====
Research shows that multiculturalism has positive implications for intergroup attitudes. Individual difference in multiculturalism ideology is related to different intergroup attitudes, such that people who score higher on measure of the ideology and support for multicultural policies are more tolerant of outgroups. Similarly, a meta-analysis of multicultural education programs indicates that multiculturalism as diversity ideology positively influences intergroup attitudes. With regard to prejudice, dominant group members who endorse multiculturalism exhibit less explicit and implicit prejudice towards minority members. Moreover, priming a multiculturalism ideology in majority group members is shown to increase their inclusivity, including increased capability of perspective-taking, more positive perception of minority group members, less ethnocentrism or ingroup bias, and less tendency to discriminate. From minority groups' perspective, because multiculturalism is more aligned with minority groups' need to identify with their unique group identity, minority groups are more likely than majority group members to support multiculturalism. Minority groups' psychological engagement in the workplace increases when working with colleagues who endorse multiculturalistic attitudes, an effect mediated by the perception of reduced intergroup bias.

==== Stereotyping ====
However, research has also identified some negative effects associated with multiculturalism. While multiculturalism tends to decrease prejudice, some studies suggest that multiculturalism is associated with stronger stereotyping of minority group member, such that stereotypical minorities are viewed as favorable by White participants than counterstereotypical minorities when they are exposed to multicultural ideology. At the same time, multiculturalism, by putting great emphasis on how groups are distinctively different from each other, may be at risk of promoting greater division between groups and foster a more salient “us” versus “them” mindset. Therefore, the ideology may encourage people to restrict themselves to only their associated group membership rather than cross group boundaries. Some research supports that multiculturalism endorsement is associated with greater beliefs that racial differences are fixed and nonchangeable, which may explain why multiculturalism leads to greater stereotyping

==== Majority group resistance ====
Another weakness of multiculturalism is that when intergroup conflict and perceived threat is high, multiculturalism can backfire and promote more hostility towards minority groups among majority group members. The more identified they are with their ingroup, majority group members experience more symbolic threat, and thus endorse multiculturalism less. When White participants perceived greater threat from racial minority groups, they endorsed multiculturalism ideology to a lesser degree, showed less tolerance of outgroups, and expressed more hostility towards their minority interaction partners.

One reason underlying the role of threat in influencing the relationship between multiculturalism and improved intergroup attitudes is that majority groups are likely to perceive multiculturalism as exclusionary to minority groups and feel threatened about their status. Research finds that dominant group members identify with the multiculturalism ideology less than their minority counterparts. White participants were slower to associate multiculturalism with their self-concept than racial minorities, and were faster to pair exclusion with multiculturalism in an implicit association test. However, after being exposed to an "all-inclusive multiculturalism" message that intentionally frames the dominant group as being part of the diversity, the automatic pairing becomes slower.

=== Comparison with colorblindness ===
As two major competing diversity ideologies, multiculturalism and colorblindness are frequently studied together to contrast their effects on intergroup interactions and attitudes. In one of the first set of studies directly comparing multiculturalism and colorblindness, researchers found that in the colorblind condition with a message of how intergroup harmony can be achieved by focusing on a superordinate identity and treating every individual as unique, participants were more likely to exhibit prejudice and ethnocentrism but less likely to display stereotyping of minority groups, as compared to the multiculturalism condition with a message stressing how diversity is valuable and group differences should be recognized. Compared to colorblindness, multiculturalism is also associated with greater collective self-esteem, such as identification with and sense of belonging to the ingroup, for minority groups.

In a recent meta-analysis examining the relationship between different diversity ideologies and prejudice, researchers show that assimilation has a positive association with prejudice, multiculturalism has a small negative association with both explicit prejudice and implicit prejudice, and colorblindness has a very small negative correlation with prejudice. Compared to control group, priming a colorblind ideology is associated with lower explicit prejudice and ingroup bias, but with higher implicit bias than multiculturalism. Reviewers have drawn similar conclusions that the multiculturalism ideology has a more positive effect on intergroup relations and attitudes than colorblind ideology.

== Polyculturalism ==
In a polyculturalism ideology, each group's culture is not viewed as standing alone but rather receives influence from other groups’ culture and traditions too. All cultures and people are conceptualized as the products of historical and contemporary interactions among many different groups, and deeply interconnected by intersecting histories. This ideology is developed based on historians' work that recognizes the existence of multiple racial and ethnic groups and focuses on the connected history, past and traditions among groups as well as their mutual influence. For example, historian Robin Kelley underscores interracial shared past by writing, "All of us, and I mean ALL of us, are the inheritors of European, African, Native American, and even Asian pasts, even if we can’t exactly trace our blood lines to all of these continents." Similarly, in this discussion of the historical roots of Kung Fu, historian Vijay Prashad shows that although considered as a uniquely Asian cultural product, Kung Fu has also been greatly influenced by African cultures and evolved as it received influence from multiple cultures in the world. Therefore, polyculturalism pays more attention to the interactions and connections between different racial groups. Unlike assimilation and colorblindness, polyculturalism does not require giving up one's unique social group identity or being assimilated into a dominant culture. Unlike multiculturalism, besides recognizing group differences and preserving the values of each group, polyculturalism moreover focuses on emphasizing the interconnectedness of one group's identity with other groups' identities.

=== Effects ===
==== Intergroup attitudes and endorsement of equality ====
Social psychology research on polyculturalism has suggested generally positive effects on intergroup attitudes and endorsement of social equality. Polyculturalism is found to be associated with less support for social dominance and hierarchy, greater willingness to make intergroup contact, and greater support for public policies and institutions that promote social equality, such as affirmative action. It is also linked to improved and more positive intergroup attitudes towards minority groups. When dominant group participants endorsed polyculturalism more, they had less negative attitudes towards the LGBTQ community and less sexual prejudice. Moreover, preliminary evidence suggests that majority and minority groups are equally likely to support this ideology. The findings indicate that polyculturalism ideology could lead to greater endorsement of social equality, greater interest in and comfort with diversity and differences, and lower evaluative bias.

==== Openness to change and foreign ideas ====
One reason why polyculturalism promotes more positivity in intergroup relations is that polyculturalism can encourage greater willingness to learn about different cultures and open to criticize and change one's own culture. As a downstream consequence, research finds that polyculturalism fosters creativity on problems that emphasizes cultural integration, an effect driven by greater propensity for foreign idea inclusion. Colorblindness, on the other hand, impaired creativity in problem-solving tasks that required associations between cultures.

=== Potential weaknesses ===
There are some potential issues associated polyculturalism. Polyculturalism might lead group members to perceive that the cultural traditions and attributes valued by and unique to their respective ingroup as de-emphasized. When people deem their ingroup contribution to these values as greater than outgroups, they can view outgroups as more deviant than interconnected, which could have negative impact on intergroup harmony (see Ingroup Projection Model). As the study of this ideology is in an early stage, the weaknesses of polyculturalism and how it might incur backlash await further examination.

== See also ==
- Color blindness (race)
- Cultural assimilation
- Diversity (business)
- Intergroup anxiety
- Intergroup bias
- Intergroup dialogue
- Intergroup relations
- Multiculturalism
