= Schiappa =

Schiappa is a surname. Notable people with the surname include:

- David J. Schiappa (born 1962), American politician
- Edward Schiappa (born 1954), American academic
- Marlène Schiappa (born 1982), French writer and politician
