= Superordinate =

Superordinate may refer to:

- In metadata analysis and linguistics, an element of analytical relationship-classification schemes
- Superordinate goals, in psychology, those goals that further other specified goals
- Hypernymy, in the context of linguistic hyponymy and hypernymy
