= Mental illness in media =

Critique of media portrayal of mental illness

Mental illnesses, also known as psychiatric disorders, are often inaccurately portrayed in the media. Films, television programs, books, magazines, and news programs often stereotype the mentally ill as being violent, unpredictable, or dangerous, unlike the great majority of those who experience mental illness. As media is often the primary way people are exposed to mental illnesses, when portrayals are inaccurate, they further perpetuate stereotypes, stigma, and discriminatory behavior. When the public stigmatizes the mentally ill, people with mental illnesses become less likely to seek treatment or support for fear of being judged or rejected by the public. However, with proper support, not only are most of those with psychiatric disorders able to function adequately in society, but many are able to work successfully and make substantial contributions to society.

== History ==
According to the Robert Wood Foundation, the primary way Americans gain information about mental illnesses is through mass media, more specifically, television and news. Furthermore, when it comes to believing ideas presented about mental illness, the public more often aligns their perceptions closer to mass media portrayals than information presented by experts in the field.

In 2006, Heather Stuart published an article, "Media Portrayal of Mental Illness and its Treatments," discussing how the image of mental illness is mainly negative and those with mental illnesses are often labeled as violent and criminal. As the general public has little access to or experience with clinical psychology, their information about psychiatric patients is primarily obtained from the mass media. With limited knowledge gained through their own experiences, it is feared that the images and stories encountered via mass media can affect the decisions and judgments the public makes when it comes to their own lives or forming their political or social opinions, furthering the public's rejection of psychiatric patients. As the media often perpetuates stereotypes with the use of discriminatory language, misinformation, and mischaracterizations of mental illness, these negative media representations have become the focus of scholarly attention.

== Film and television ==
When it comes to portrayals in entertainment, depictions typically represent mentally ill characters as being recognizably different, often exaggerating their mannerisms and appearance to further distinguish them from normal characters. Throughout the last century of filmmaking, they have most commonly been portrayed as villains, often either the victims or perpetrators of violence, and generally dangerous.

=== Evolution of mental illness representation in film ===
An overused trope used in film and television is depicting villains or murderers as mentally ill. This trope has evolved throughout the history of filmmaking and cinema. First introduced in the early 1900s, films like Dr. Mabuse, the Gambler (1922) and The Black Cat (1934) depicted the mentally ill villains as mad, evil doctors. Then, with the rise of Alfred Hitchcock films, he introduced the serial killer in Psycho (1960), whose character trope was subsequently used in films like Homicidal (1961), Maniac (1963), Paranoiac (1963), and Nightmare (1963). The 1970s and 1980s brought the popular "slasher" film genre, introducing iconic horror characters such as Michael Myers, Jason, and Freddy Kruger from the franchises Halloween, Friday the 13th, and A Nightmare on Elm Street, respectively.

=== Violent depictions of mental illness ===
The negative stigma that surrounds mental illness has real-life consequences for those who experience these illnesses. Many studies, both in the form of experimental designs and surveys, have concluded that media exposure does affect the stigmatization of mental illness.

Despite the media's common depictions of mentally ill characters being violent or engaging in criminal activities, it is much less common in the real world than the media makes it seem. Of the 40+ million people in the U.S. who are classified as experiencing mental illness, violence or criminality occurs only in 10-12% of mental illness cases. However, as film and television programs utilize this trope for dramatic storytelling, the public often falsely assumes that the real world mirrors the mass media depictions. Scholars began analyzing this trend in the 1950s, yet the issue persists into the 21st century.

In the late 1950s, the concern regarding mass media portrayals of mental illness started becoming more prominent. At the time, television network censors were used to determine the level of viewing (adults only, family-friendly, or needed altered content) that was appropriate based on the film's content. George Gerbner, before he developed cultivation theory, studied the films that were censored and found that in 1951, only five films contained representations of mental illness. However, by 1957, the number rose to 170 films, demonstrating the growing concern over misrepresentations and their effects.

Although the concern over the effects began to grow, the violent depictions remained the same. In a 1989 longitudinal study conducted by the Cultural Indicators Project, they analyzed the portrayal of mentally ill characters on 1,215 television programs between 1969 and 1985. They found that 3 out of 4 characters were involved in violent situations, either becoming victims of violence or perpetrating it. In addition to the mentally ill characters having violent tendencies, they also were distancing themselves from loved ones, and often did not work.

Finally, nearly 50 years after one of the inaugural studies that analyzed the overuse of mentally ill, violent characters in media, the misconception persists, even into the 21st century. Diefenbach and West conducted a cultivation study that examined 84 hours of prime-time television among major networks in April 2003. They found that mentally ill characters on television were much more likely to commit violent crimes than real-world statistics. Only 4% of people with mental illnesses in the real world are characterized as violent, while 37% of mentally ill characters on television are portrayed as violent.

== Portrayals in film ==
Title	Year released
Fight Club	1999
A Beautiful Mind	2001
Memento	2000
What Dreams May Come	1998
The Night Listener	2006
Awakenings	1990
Sideways	2004
Julien Donkey Boy	1999
Silver Linings Playbook	2012
One Flew Over the Cuckoo's Nest	1975
Rain Man	1988
Black Swan	2010
Shutter Island	2010
Lars and the Real Girl	2007
What's Eating Gilbert Grape	1993
The Three Faces of Eve	1957
American Psycho	2000
Donnie Darko	2001
The Silence of the Lambs	1991
The Aviator	2004
The Soloist	2009
Gaslight	1944
Loose Cannons	1990
The King of Staten Island	2020
Leaving Las Vegas	1995
Girl, Interrupted	1999
Little Miss Sunshine	2006
The Skeleton Twins	2014
The Perks of Being a Wallflower	2012
Joker	2019
Split	2016

- Sideways gives an accurate depiction of depression. Depression (major depressive disorder) is characterized as a mood disorder that causes severe feelings of sadness and disinterest. One of the movie's main characters, Miles Raymond, is shown to exhibit several signs of depression, some of which include using substances (alcohol) in an attempt to cope with the failures and losses in his life, not having hope for his future, and having a consistently depressed mood.
- Julien Donkey Boy gives an accurate depiction of schizophrenia. Schizophrenia is one of the most commonly misunderstood mental illnesses, yet over 2 million people suffer from this illness within the U.S. The term schizophrenia comes from Eugen Bleuler and translates to "split psyche," as the psyche is split into many disorganized parts. Symptoms include, but are not limited to, delusions, hallucinations, and disturbances in thoughts and emotions. These symptoms prohibit those suffering from this illness from leading a normal life, causing social and occupational dysfunction, often necessitating hospitalization. The movie features a man named Julien, who exhibits several signs of schizophrenia. One of these signs includes having conversations with people who are not there in reality.
- Silver Linings Playbook gives an accurate depiction of bipolar disorder. Bipolar disorder is a mental illness characterized by a dysregulation of mood, often accompanied by depressive and manic episodes, anxiety, hyperactivity, irregular sleep, aggressiveness, and irritability. This story follows a family as they navigate the realities of helping their son after he returns home from treatment for bipolar disorder.
- Girl, Interrupted gives an accurate depiction of borderline personality disorder. Borderline personality disorder is a mental illness that affects a person's ability to manage or control their emotions effectively. It can affect how people view themselves and the people around them, causing instability and an inability to foster healthy relationships. This film follows a young woman's journey living in a psychiatric facility in the 1960s, her medical treatment, and how this affects her relationships with herself and other characters.
- The Perks of Being a Wallflower gives an accurate portrayal of post-traumatic stress disorder. Post-traumatic stress disorder is a condition that can develop after a person experiences or witnesses a traumatic event. Symptoms can include persistent thoughts of the event, severe anxiety, and nightmares. PTSD typically manifests in one of four ways: intrusive memories, avoidance, negative thoughts or moods, and changes in physical or emotional reactions. This film follows high school freshman Charlie as he navigates platonic and romantic relationships amid his childhood trauma of sexual abuse by a close family member.

== Portrayals in television ==
Television is in over 90% of U.S. households and in 1995 it had a strong influence on how viewers perceive the world. In terms of mental illness portrayals, television has been a pioneer in representing these illnesses across thousands of programs in nearly a century's worth of content. The media often depicts people with mental illness as violent or unpredictable, creating misrepresentations and harmful stereotypes. Research shows that viewers who watch more television are more likely to have negative views about mental health. Although television has frequently misrepresented mental health, there has been a growing shift towards more accurate and honest portrayals.

=== Reality television ===
There are programs specifically dedicated to showcasing the lives and resulting struggles of people experiencing specific mental illnesses. For example, the hit television show on the A&E network, Hoarders, showcases one or two individuals and their obsessive-compulsive disorder. Throughout an episode, each individual works with a psychologist or psychiatrist, professional organizer, or an "extreme cleaning specialist" specializing in treating this disorder.

Another program on the A&E network, Intervention, introduces audiences to people dealing with substance abuse. This program, in a similar format to Hoarders, follows the story of either one or two individuals who suffer from substance dependence. During an episode, the audience follows the individuals' daily lives and is introduced to the reality of living with this dependence. The individuals are then confronted with an ultimatum in which they must decide whether to seek rehabilitation or risk losing family, friends, shelter, and, in most cases, financial assistance. This documentary-style television program is valuable because it educates viewers about the entire intervention process, from being introduced to the intervention process itself to the proper way to handle an individual with addiction. It also effectively decreases the stigma of therapy and demonstrates the effectiveness of interventions.

=== Mental illness referred to in children's television ===
A 2000 study of New Zealand Children's television shows showed that a mental illness reference appeared in 59 out of 128 episodes chosen. In those 59 episodes, there were 159 references to mental illness, frequently of character descriptions. The terms "mad," "crazy," and "losing your mind" were above the three most common references. Character appearances consisted of disfigured facial features (teeth, noses, etc.) and disfigured extremities.

Mental illness has also been portrayed in Walt Disney animated films. A study examined the portrayal of mental illness in Disney films and found that 85% of these films made reference to mental illness, and 21% of the characters were referred to as mentally ill. On average, 4.6 references to mental illness were made in these films, with the most commonly used terms being "mad," "crazy," or "nutty." The study highlighted how Maurice, from Beauty and the Beast, was often depicted as mentally ill, referred to as a lunatic, and was even attempted to be sent to an asylum.

Another study examined 40 children's programs on Netflix, analyzing 339 episodes for references to mental illness. The study found that 23 of these programs had at least one reference to mental illness, with 58 episodes featuring such references. It also noted differences in how male and female characters with mental illness were portrayed. Male characters were often depicted as violent or aggressive, while female characters were shown as "crazy" or obsessive. For instance, the character Miss Ackerman from iCarly was described as "crazy" and "looney." The study concluded that progress in addressing mental illness representation in children's television has been limited, with many negative portrayals still present.

=== Approaches of streaming media platforms ===
The rise in popularity of streaming content on platforms such as Netflix, Hulu, Max, and Amazon Prime Video brought easier media access for viewers, as well as decreased regulation of content for television. Since it has become easier for the public to access different media forms, including movies, TV series, or other programs worldwide, the popular streaming service Netflix demonstrates different approaches to mental illness with various portrayals. Amongst the series Netflix provided, the recent study exploring the series 13 Reasons Why found that the representations of mental-health phenomena positively influence the individual's perceptions in understanding perceived norms regarding mental health problems, such as reaching out to others for support and discussing suicide with people for prevention.

13 Reasons Why is a Netflix original with the plot surrounding a high school female, Hannah Baker, who commits suicide in the season one finale. Controversy around this TV show has arisen, especially surrounding the idea of linking Baker's suicide to a form of anger and revenge. Some argue that there is too much emphasis on how Hannah committed suicide, including the graphic visuals, and not enough focus on the true reasons behind ending her life. Others also emphasize how shows such as 13 Reasons Why simply skim over and cover only the surface of these issues and thus somehow desensitize something as important as suicide. For example, this specific show was accused of not talking much about mental health in its first season (besides the suicide itself). Furthermore, The National Alliance on Mental Health (NAMI) additionally argues that the depiction of a "planned out suicide" is damaging, as suicides are rarely planned.

== News ==
Similar to depictions of mental illness in entertainment, news programs and publications tend to misrepresent the causes, symptoms, and treatments of mental illnesses. More often than not, the central message conveyed is that people with mental illnesses are violent, criminal, dangerous, and should be avoided. Furthermore, when it comes to news media, only the most exciting and oversensationalized stories tend to make headlines. This influx of violent stories involving mentally ill people makes these cases seem more common than in reality.

When covering topics surrounding mental illness, journalists are more likely to interview family members or people close to a person with mental illness rather than the person experiencing mental illness themselves. This tendency eliminates the possibility of audiences engaging in parasocial contact with people experiencing mental illness firsthand. The parasocial contact hypothesis posits that positive portrayals of minority groups in media help to reduce stigmas and stereotypes surrounding these groups. When audiences are granted the opportunity to engage in parasocial contact, they tend to form more positive attitudes, thoughts, and beliefs about the illness and the people experiencing it. Therefore, when mentally ill people are denied the opportunity to speak for themselves, the public is more likely to form unfavorable opinions of them and their illnesses.

Since mass media can affect the public's perception of mental illnesses, journalists are encouraged to utilize The Associated Press Stylebook when reporting on mental illnesses. These guidelines help mitigate the use of slang and discriminatory language. Similarly, The World Health Organization also provides guidelines for news outlets when discussing suicide to prevent cases of the Werther Effect. However, even with strict guidelines and models, news coverage of mental illnesses can create significant controversy, both for the news outlet and the journalists themselves.

=== Controversy within the news industry ===
In 2012, India Knight wrote a column in The Sunday Times of London about depression. In response, Alastair Campbell, a columnist at The Huffington Post, described his distress at her writing that "'everybody gets depressed'" and that "there is no stigma in depression."

Campbell discussed the inappropriateness of Knight's word choices. In writing that "everybody gets depressed," he commented, she showed that she was part of a group that does not believe that clinical depression is a disease. Campbell claimed that Knight's article reinforced the reality that there is still stigma surrounding depression. He noted that even in the medical profession, people are afraid to mention to their employers that they have depression because they would not be fully understood as they would be if they suffered from a "physical illness." Campbell wrote of the struggle to bring understanding to mental illness, and described Knight's article as "unhelpful, potentially damaging and certainly show[ing that] we still have quite a way to go."

== Portrayals in news ==
Inaccurate portrayals of mental health in the news ultimately affect the audience's thoughts, attitudes, opinions, and beliefs, not only for the mentally ill but also for the illnesses themselves, the treatment required, and the public policy necessary to implement initiatives for change. However, these dramatic stories may not be the only culprit for swaying public opinion. Consistent patterns of misinformation, framing, and one-sided perspectives have the same ability to shape public perception.

In 1991, a content analysis of United Press International stories found that stories about psychiatric patients usually involved violent crimes. In a similar study by Wahl, Wood, and Richards, they analyzed the common themes present in 1999 stories about mental illness amongst six major newspapers: The New York Times, The Washington Post, St. Louis Post-Dispatch, The Boston Globe, Los Angeles Times, and the St. Petersburg Times (Tampa Bay Times). Of the 300 randomly selected stories containing the phrase "mental illness," dangerousness was the overwhelming theme across all six publications, with 26% involving violence or criminal activity by a mentally ill person. The consistent pattern of linking mental illness and violence not only leads to the public being fearful or avoidant of mentally ill people but also less likely to offer or support community care.

Furthermore, when news outlets depict mentally ill people as violent, there is a resulting increased demand by the public for "forced treatment," as exemplified in the tragedy that led to New York's establishment of Kendra's Law. In 1999, Andrew Goldstein pushed Kendra Webdale onto New York City subway tracks. The following news stories labeled Goldstein as "The Subway Psycho" and subsequently advocated for his banishment from public streets. This uprising led to the establishment of Kendra's Law, which allowed the court to order those with mental illnesses to outpatient treatment programs.

The over-saturation of stories linking mental illness and violence prohibits mentally ill people from leading a normal life. Many employers are resistant to hiring those with a history of or current struggle with mental illness. Although the Equal Employment Opportunity Commission establishes guidelines to discourage hiring discrimination, the stigma persists into the workplace.

Finally, the saturation of stories about violent or criminal mentally ill people overshadows the need for positive or even neutral stories. When it comes to coverage of mental illness in the news, the stories are overwhelmingly negative and tend to focus only on the dysfunction or disability aspects. Stories of recovery or accomplishment are rarely shared. This consistent framing of stories about mental illness ultimately leads to a myriad of effects.

== Effects of media portrayals ==
The media is indirectly responsible for shaping the public's perceptions of mental illness. Although severely inaccurate portrayals often produce negative effects, there can also be positive outcomes.

=== Positive effects ===
As the public becomes more aware of the stereotypical nature of mental illness depictions, there is an increasing number of studies being done to examine how media messages can positively affect audiences by decreasing stigma. Research has found that news stories are much more likely to produce positive audience comments and reactions if they use counter-stigmatism in their storytelling rather than stereotypes and discriminatory language.

In a more specific sense, media portraying a realistic account of mental illness can give medical professionals a glimpse into the life and realities of living with such an illness. The research regarding the educational aspects of the film for nurse students from all fields suggested that the films of different genres, including life stories, adventures, and others, provided practical insights into understanding the patient experience and perspectives in different environments.

Another research also found the positive aspects of the movies for educational purposes on students in medical (clinical) fields. The films provide valuable lessons for individuals in understanding the specific cases and appropriate treatment plans for patients. Even though there are some concerns that movies are not intended for educational purposes but for entertainment, researchers suggest that films provide positive outcomes in students' learning experiences. Regarding the positive roles of film in education, a case study analyzing students in medical fields found that the appropriate use of movies can provide helpful ideas in applying practical skills related to the medical fields, such as medical ethics, doctor-patient relationships, and mental illness.

Celebrity Disclosures

Celebrities' influences and their own personal experiences with mental illness can help in decreasing the stereotypes and stigma surrounding mental illness. Stars, including Lady Gaga, Serena Williams, Adele, and Dwayne Johnson, have recently disclosed their mental health journeys. Celebrities disclosing their personal experiences can help inform the public about symptoms and services regarding mental health, allowing mental health struggles to feel more normal and accepted. According to the social learning theory, people often adopt behaviors by observing others, especially celebrities, and seeing the outcomes of their actions. When a celebrity reveals their mental health struggles and remains successful and respected, it can help reduce the fear of facing negative consequences for sharing personal experiences.

=== Negative effects ===
However, there are concerns regarding the role of movies in shaping the younger individual's perceptions of defining mental illness. Previous research regarding the film One Flew Over the Cuckoo's Nest (1975) with college students found that the portrayal of mental illness can negatively influence the individual's attitudes regarding individuals with mental illness, psychiatric institutions, and associated factors, leading to discrimination and general lack of opportunity for work, housing, and finding community for those experiencing mental illness.

The public's misconception of certain mental illnesses poses a more significant threat than their negative opinions and judgments of those with issues with mental health. It may alter their ability to recognize signs and symptoms of certain mental illnesses in themselves or people they know if they are not consistent with the image they have come to know and recognize through media. Many people believe that the mental health content in mass media is checked by professionals for accuracy and, therefore, safe to believe and gather conclusions from. However, as many television shows do no such thing, people are led to believe inaccurate portrayals. Furthermore, mass media's depiction of mental illnesses causing violent or dangerous behavior may lead the public to believe that mentally ill people are more likely to harm others than in reality. This phenomenon can lead to the public being less likely to help or visit friends and family who are experiencing mental illness.

In a previous research study, the researchers found that the representation of the "outcast" character with mental illness in a movie tends to get negative evaluations from the children. Regarding this, the study found that it could make the children stick with the significant levels of stigmatization in negatively labeling individuals with mental illness even when they grow up. Other research specifically focused on a particular film, Joker, found that the depiction of individuals with mental illness appears to be negative towards the audience. Regarding this, the researchers demonstrated the concerns that the film Joker could aggravate the self-stigma of individuals with mental illness with an emphasis on negative depictions.

Another troubling effect is that stereotypical imagery, coupled with the lack of alternative viewpoints, further dissuades mentally ill people from seeking help or treatment. Due to the generally negative view of mental illnesses, regardless of whether or not it is based on truth, those who experience mental illness often feel dejected, embarrassed, or shameful about their diagnoses. These feelings may lead people with mental illnesses to distance themselves from loved ones and often avoid seeking help or treatment due to fear of rejection.

==== Copycat suicides and romanticisation ====
Another negative effect that misrepresentation of mental illnesses through the news can cause is copycat suicide. As with the deaths of celebrities Kate Spade and Robin Williams, an abundance of media and news coverage occurs. A Columbia University study revealed that "suicides rose nearly 10% higher than expected in the months following Robin Williams' death in August 2014," especially involving the method used by Robin Williams himself (a 32% increase). These results support the idea of suicide contagion, which the U.S. Department of Health & Human Services (HHS) defines as "the exposure to suicide or suicidal behaviors within one's family, one's peer group, or through media reports of suicide and can result in an increase in suicide and suicidal behaviors."

A notable mid-2010s case of modern digital media contagion is the 2015 suicide of 16-year-old Russian student Renata Kambolina (known online under the pseudonym Rina Palenkova). After posting a final trackside selfie with the caption "nya. bye." ("ня.пока."), her tragic death rapidly went viral on the Russian social network VKontakte. This sparked a dangerous wave of romanticisation that falsely framed her as a virtual idol, prompting numerous vulnerable youths to replicate either her final words, her exact photo framing, or both, during their own suicides or attempted suicides—notably Gleb Korablyov in 2019. Like Kambolina, Korablyov also had his tragic death immediately seized upon and mythologised by internet trolls and morbid online communities. Crucially, investigations confirmed that Kambolina had absolutely no involvement with the "Blue Whale Challenge" or online "death groups", as they did not exist at the time of her passing. Instead, her story and imagery were retroactively co-opted and weaponised by predatory online administrators to orchestrate a widespread moral panic, fabricate the mythos of a centralized "suicide game", and draw susceptible teenagers into harmful online communities.

== Social media and mental health portrayal ==
Mental illness is often discussed on social media and several studies have noted a link between it and severe psychiatric disorders. Studies such as one in 1998 led by Robert E. Kraut indicated that Internet can have an impact on a person's daily life and that increased amounts of time online can have a detrimental impact on interpersonal relationships and social interactions, which can in turn lead to increased depression and alienation.

Today, social media platforms such as Twitter or Instagram have increased the amount of personal interaction with other users. There is current research that explores the role social media has in assisting people find resources and networks to support one's mental health. The interconnectivity between users through social media has encouraged many to seek help with professionals while also reducing the stigma surrounding mental illnesses. Though these claims are still being researched, there is a notable rise in communication within social media as a whole.

The Scottish Health Survey conducted a study monitoring screen time and mental health in individuals. The research concluded that adults ages 16–99 who watch TV more than three hours a day were more likely to have poor mental health. 3 hours or more of television or screen time in children lead to a downward trend in mental health positivity. The study concluded that there is a correlation between screen time and a decline in mental health.

=== TikTok ===
TikTok has especially become a social media platform where mental health and illnesses are talked about more freely. The National institutes of Health (NIH) released in 2015 that more than 1/3 of Americans use the internet to help "diagnose their ailments", including mental illnesses. TikTok videos promoting either self-diagnosis or possible symptoms of different illnesses has caused an increase of internet users to believe they have a disorder, when in reality they may or may not. Additionally, TikTok keeps up with the latest trends, and some trends touch upon mental health (positively or negatively, depending on the point of view). One trend, as explained by the Philadelphia Magazine, uses intermittent fasting to heal anxiety. However, some individuals, including licensed counselors such as Akua K. Boateng argue that this advice is actually very detrimental in actually promoting bad mental habits instead, including the possible development of eating disorders.

Other trends, including "What I eat in a day" Tiktoks, have been also labeled as harmful by health professionals, since these videos may lead viewers to habits of unhealthy comparison and goals of developing the "societal accepted body". With a majority of these videos reaching women especially, many believe that viewers may become more vulnerable, leading to unhealthy eating habits.

=== Tumblr ===
There exists a large population of self-identified mentally ill users on Tumblr, where the ability to post more unfiltered content led to individuals arguably sensationalizing and glamorizing mental illnesses and suicide. A thesis on Tumblr poetry explains how "the site serves as both a place of relief for people with mental health disorders, or even just every day growing pains, but it can also act as an enabling source for users who use the site as an echo chamber for their own problematic coping mechanisms, implying a groupthink problem that can exist in this kind of digital space." Tumblr staff attempted to prevent the use of their platform for romanticizing mental illness by changing their policies in 2012 to prohibit content actively promoting or depicting self harm and showing Public Service Announcements instead of results when users search keywords related to self-harm, such as "proana," "thinspo," "thinspiration," "purge," "bulimia," "anorexic," and more.

=== YouTube ===
While mass media often further cements stereotypes and stigmas among the public, social media platforms like YouTube can be a place for online users to discuss the culture of discrimination and prejudice surrounding mental health and advocate for change. Platforms like YouTube that encourage people to contribute and challenge the norms have opened up opportunities to change the discourse surrounding mental health and mental illness portrayals. Vlogging, or "autopathography," has become an excellent tool for those experiencing mental illness to regain their agency by sharing their own stories and perspectives on the illnesses themselves. This stream-of-consciousness approach has been shown to garner more public support as audiences feel more personally connected to the stories told.

=== Memes ===
Internet Memes have become more popular in recent years, with many online platforms sharing content that reflects the experiences of people with various mental health conditions, such as anxiety, borderline personality disorder, suicidal thoughts, and depression. Many individuals use memes to lighten their emotional burdens, find humor in their struggles, and connect with others who are going through similar experiences. A study found that 47% of college students reported using internet memes as a way to ease their psychiatric symptoms. Memes can also portray mental health struggles as trendy or appealing rather than focusing on the actual difficulties these issues cause. Memes featuring "Literally Me" characters dealing with mental illness have become increasingly popular over time, largely because of the widespread appeal of internet memes. The film American Psycho features Patrick Bateman, while Joker focuses on the Joker, with both characters being portrayed as "Literally Me" figures struggling with mental illness. Yet, their illnesses are still admired and glorified in popular culture.

== Theoretical approaches ==
=== Cultivation theory ===
George Gerbner's cultivation theory suggests heavy media exposure leads to a distorted view of reality. First-order cultivation leads viewers to believe that the social environment present within media reflects the real-world. Second-order cultivation leads to viewers forming attitudes, opinions, and beliefs due to this media exposure. Therefore, when people encounter the same portrayals and patterns of mental illness through the media, they form beliefs that are consistent with those portrayals. As the number of cases of violence perpetrated by mentally ill characters is higher in media than in reality, this misrepresentation can cause heavy media viewers to falsely believe that mentally ill people are more violent than they are in reality.

=== Framing theory ===
Framing theory is a mass communications theory that explains how information can be structured and disseminated to promote a specific view on a particular issue. In the context of mental illness portrayals, the media's framing of information about health and mental illnesses can affect an audience's attitudes and beliefs toward those illnesses. As framing is most commonly associated with negative effects, it also has the power to redefine and destigmatize mental illnesses.

=== Social learning theory ===
Albert Bandura's social learning theory proposes that individuals learn through personal experience and observing others. Behaviors are shaped by rewards, punishments, and modeling, with reinforced behaviors being more likely to be repeated. The theory also explains that aggression is learned through observing aggressive actions, as shown in studies where children copied violent behavior after watching it. Television plays a role in teaching and reinforcing societal norms, including how to interact with individuals who have psychiatric disorders.

=== Confirmation bias ===
Confirmation bias is the tendency for people to be more likely to engage with and believe ideas that confirm their preconceived notions. Mass media is not necessarily the root cause of the public's general misconception or judgment of people experiencing mental illness. It is, however, a way for people to confirm their existing beliefs and biases about mental illnesses.

=== Parasocial contact hypothesis ===
The parasocial contact hypothesis posits that positive portrayals of minority groups in media help to reduce stigmas and stereotypes surrounding these groups. Applying this theory to the portrayal of mental illnesses, if media represents well-rounded, accurate characters who are experiencing mental illness, it can challenge the long-standing stereotypes and work to reduce the stigma surrounding mental health. Furthermore, when in-groups and out-groups engage in positive contact, there is the possibility of challenging stereotypes and prejudice.

=== Parasocial relationships ===
Parasocial relationships form when audiences grow an attachment or develop a one-sided relationship with a celebrity or someone in the public eye. These relationships can garner the public's support and advocacy when the celebrity publicly shares their struggles with mental health. Furthermore, suppose these celebrities die by suicide or other mental health-related cases. In this case, fans may feel more compelled to share resources for treatment, research the illness, or participate in discussions of mental health in person and within online communities.

=== Prosumers ===
With the rise of social media and content curation, consumers are becoming prosumers at an increasing rate. This phenomenon is allowing the public to partake in cultural commentary on mental health and begin working to challenge and change the stigmas surrounding mental illness within online communities.

== Modern perception and looking ahead ==
The portrayal of mental illness in media, including film and television shows, is presented in various forms since the advancement in technology occurs over time with easier access. The media expert suggests the public needs to become more open to learning about mental illness by understanding significant components presented in media platforms, including film and television entertainment.

The journal article concerning depictions of the media on mental illness also emphasizes the importance of having broader perceptions in understanding the different experiences of others in addressing crucial topics related to mental illness. Since it was found that the movies are also responsible for depicting various experiences of others with mental illness, the accurate portrayal of associated characteristics is significant.

The 21st century has brought nuanced storytelling with mental illness representation that encourages healthy discussion regarding this often taboo topic.

Consumers becoming prosumers or produsers opens the door for people to challenge the long-standing stigmas and stereotypes present within traditional media platforms. This new wave of media allows people to create content and share with communities more effectively and appropriately. In addition, first-hand accounts and an increased number of discussions about mental health in online communities are leading to the public gaining more insight into the lives of people experiencing mental illness and, as a result, garnering more empathy.

== See also ==
- Mental disorders in film
