= Richard J. Crisp =

British psychologist

Richard J. Crisp is an author, blogger, scientist and Professor of Psychology at Durham University. He is co-originator of the imagined contact hypothesis and a contributor to the field of social psychology.

== Life ==
Richard Crisp was born in London, and educated at The Sir Joseph Williamson's Mathematical School in Rochester, Kent. He went on to study Experimental Psychology at the University of Oxford and completed his PhD in Social Psychology at University of Wales. After his doctoral work, he was appointed to a Lectureship in Psychology at the University of Birmingham (1999). In 2007, he was appointed Professor of Psychology in the Centre for the Study of Group Processes at the University of Kent. He was Head of the School of Psychology at Kent from 2008 to 2011. From 2012 to 2014, he was Professor of Social Psychology at the University of Sheffield and from 2014 to 2017, Professor of Social Psychology and Associate Dean for Research and Enterprise at the Aston Business School. Since 2017, he has been Professor of Social Psychology at Durham University.

== Work ==
Richard Crisp has published widely on diversity, multiculturalism, prejudice, stereotyping, social cognition and intergroup contact. His scholarly contributions are known for their application of cutting-edge advances in psychological science to pervasive and problematic social issues. In 2007, he developed a new lab-based cognitive intervention for reducing prejudice and promoting tolerance based on the application of theory and research into mental imagery (the imagined contact hypothesis). He has also offered evidence that living in diverse, multicultural societies can produce a wide range of benefits associated with 'flexible thinking' - including enhanced creativity, problem solving and negotiation skills ("cognitive adaptation to diversity]").

In 2011, he was elected Fellow of the British Psychological Society in recognition of his 'outstanding contribution to the advancement or dissemination of psychological knowledge'. He is also an elected Fellow of the Academy of Social Sciences, Association for Psychological Science, and Society for Experimental Social Psychology. He is a former Associate Editor of the Journal of Experimental Social Psychology (2008-2011) and is currently Editor-in-Chief of the Journal of Applied Social Psychology (2012-).

== Prizes and awards ==
- 2003: Society for the Psychological Study of Social Issues Louise Kidder Early Career Award (2003)
- 2006: Spearman Medal from the British Psychological Society, for work on mental imagery, "in recognition of outstanding published work in psychology".
- 2011: Gordon Allport Intergroup Relations Prize.
- 2012: with Rhiannon Turner, awarded the Society for the Psychological Study of Social Issues (for the best paper of the year on intergroup relations).
- 2013: winner of the British Psychological Society Social Psychology Section Mid-Career Prize (for outstanding research in social psychology)
- 2014: won the British Psychological Society President's Award for Distinguished Contributions to Psychological Knowledge.

== Works ==
- Crisp, R. J. & Turner, R. N. (2010). Essential Social Psychology (2nd ed.). London: Sage. (also published in Chinese, Italian, Polish and Portuguese)

=== Editorial contributions ===
- Crisp, R. J. (Ed.) (2011). Social Psychology: Critical Concepts in Psychology. Hove, E. Sussex: Routledge (Taylor & Francis).
- Crisp, R. J. (Ed.) (2010). The Psychology of Social and Cultural Diversity. Oxford: SPSSI-Blackwell.
- Crisp, R. J. & Hewstone, M. (Eds.) (2006). Multiple Social Categorization: Processes, Models and Applications. Hove, E. Sussex: Psychology Press (Taylor & Francis).
