= Business case =

Document providing reasoning for a project

A business case captures the reasoning for initiating a project or task. Many projects, but not all, are initiated by using a business case. It is often presented in a well-structured written document, but may also come in the form of a short verbal agreement or presentation. The logic of the business case is that, whenever resources such as money or effort are consumed, they should be in support of a specific business need. An example could be that a software upgrade might improve system performance, but the "business case" is that better performance would improve customer satisfaction, require less task processing time, or reduce system maintenance costs. A compelling business case adequately captures both the quantifiable and non-quantifiable characteristics of a proposed project. According to the Project Management Institute, a business case is a "value proposition for a proposed project that may include financial and nonfinancial benefit".

Business cases can range from comprehensive and highly structured, as required by formal project management methodologies, to informal and brief. Information included in a formal business case could be the background of the project, the expected business benefits, the options considered (with reasons for rejecting or carrying forward each option), the expected costs of the project, a gap analysis and the expected risks. Consideration should also be given to the option of doing nothing including the costs and risks of inactivity. From this information, the justification for the project is derived.

== Reasons for creating a business case ==
Business cases are created to help decision-makers ensure that:

- the proposed initiative will have value and relative priority compared to alternative initiatives based on the objectives and expected benefits laid out in the business case.
- the performance indicators found in the business case are identified to be used for proactive realization of the business and behavioral change.

== Development and approval process ==
=== Business process ===
A business process, business method, or business function is a collection of related, structured activities or tasks performed by people or equipment in which a specific sequence produces a service or product (that serves a particular business goal) for a particular customer or customers. Business processes occur at all organizational levels and may or may not be visible to the customers. A business process may often be visualized (modeled) as a flowchart of a sequence of activities with interleaving decision points or as a process matrix of a sequence of activities with relevance rules based on data in the process. The benefits of using business processes include improved customer satisfaction and improved agility for reacting to rapid market change. Process-oriented organizations break down the barriers of structural departments and try to avoid functional silos.

=== Business process design ===
The business case process should be designed to be:

- adaptable – tailored to the size and risk of the proposal
- consistent – the same basic business issues are addressed by every project
- business oriented – concerned with the business capabilities and impact, rather than having a technical focus
- comprehensive – includes all factors relevant to a complete evaluation
- understandable – the contents are clearly relevant, logical and, although demanding, are simple to complete and evaluate
- measurable – all key aspects can be quantified so their achievement can be tracked and measured
- transparent – key elements can be justified directly
- accountable – accountability and commitments for the delivery of benefits and management of costs are clear.

== Components of a business case report ==
A good business case report brings confidence and accountability into the field of making investment decisions. It is a compilation of all information collected during enterprise analysis and the business case process. The key objective is to provide evidence and justification for continuing with the investment proposition.

A business case can include details such as strategic alignment, return on investments, risk exposure assessment, feasibility study, expected key performance indicators, evaluations and alternative measures.

=== Strategic alignment ===
Strategic alignment is a process that ensures an organization's structure, use of resources (and culture) support its strategy. "In its simplest form, organizational strategic alignment is lining up a business' strategy with its culture." Successful outcomes also require an awareness of the wider environment, regulatory issues and technological change. Strategic alignment contributes to improved performance by optimizing the operation of processes/systems, and the activities of teams and departments. Goal-setting theory supports the relevance of clear, measurable operational objectives that can be linked to superordinate goals. This helps ensure resources are used effectively.

=== Feasibility study ===
A feasibility study is an assessment of the practicality of a project or system. A feasibility study aims to objectively and rationally uncover the strengths and weaknesses of an existing business or proposed venture, opportunities and threats present in the natural environment, the resources required to carry through, and ultimately the prospects for success. In its simplest terms, the two criteria to judge feasibility are cost required and value to be attained.

=== Key performance indicators ===
A performance indicator or key performance indicator (KPI) is a type of performance measurement. KPIs evaluate the success of an organization or of a particular activity (such as projects, programs, products and other initiatives) in which it engages. KPIs provide a focus for strategic and operational improvement, create an analytical basis for decision making and help focus attention on what matters most.

== Example of a business case report structure ==
Here is an example of a report structure for a business case:

- Preface
- Table of contents
- Executive briefing
  - Recommendation
  - Summary of results
  - Decision to be taken
- Introduction
  - Business drivers
  - Scope
  - Financial metrics
- Analysis
  - Assumptions
  - Cash flow statement (net present value, etc.)
  - Costs
  - Benefits
  - Risk
  - Implementation plan
  - Strategic options
  - Opportunity costs
- Conclusion, recommendation, and next steps
- Appendix

== Review and approval ==
At various stages in the project, the business case should be reviewed to ensure that:

- The justification is still valid,
- The project will deliver the solution to the business need.

The result of a review may be the termination or amendment of the project. The business case may also be subject to amendment if the review concludes that the business need has abated or changed, this will have a knock-on effect on the project.

== Public sector projects ==
Many public sector projects are now required to justify their need through a business case. In the public sector, the business case is argued in terms of cost–benefit analysis, which may include both financial and non-financial cost and benefits.

== See also ==
- Business plan
- Project charter
- Case competition
- Innovation
- Optimism bias
- Planning fallacy
- Reference class forecasting
- Win–win game
