= Marley hypothesis =

Psychological theory

The Marley hypothesis is a psychological theory on how racial groups may have different perceptions of the current racism in society due to a difference in their extent of knowledge and awareness of racial history. The study hypothesizes a strong correlation between how much one knows about past racial discrimination, and how well they recognize racism in a given situation. This study is executed through social experiments, which theorizes how this behavioral pattern may arise due to members of a racial subgroup viewing racial discrimination through a social lens that has been shaped by their past attuned knowledge and understanding of racist incidents in history. Researchers of the Marley Hypothesis propose that members of minority groups, the African Americans, will have a higher understanding of racial history, while the majority group, European Americans, denies or overlooks such cases.

== Original research ==
The original research for the Marley hypothesis was first proposed by scholars Jessica C. Nelson, Glenn Adams, and Phia Salter in 2012. They used a signal detection paradigm in their social experiments to explore their theory on how different groups perceive racism differently in a mirror reflection of their understanding of past racism. The experiment involved surveys completed by 199 European American students from a predominantly White university and 74 African American students from two historically Black universities. The studies found that the European American participants did not notice racism as much as the African American participants when given incidents and systemic manifestations of racism to observe. In addition, a difference in the extent of how well they knew past incidents of racism was seen, where European Americans scored lower on historical knowledge of such cases. This correlates with the study's hypothesized idea that identity is relevant to perceptions of racism, where systemic racism is present more strongly in self-image rather than isolated incidents. The study recognizes how a collective memory seen within a racial subgroup forms a collective identity which then embeds certain representations of history.

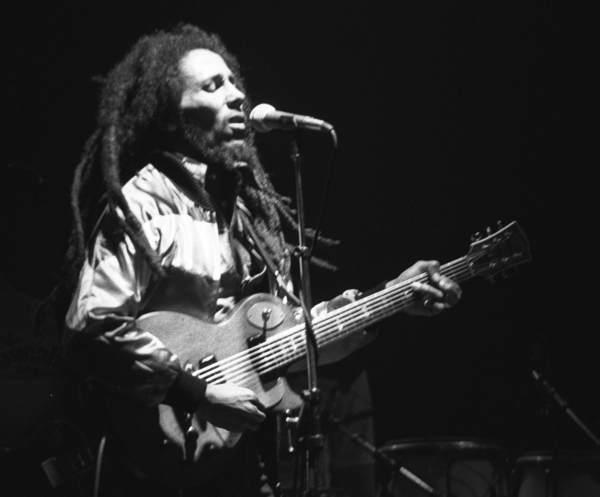
Bob Marley in Zurich, 1980

The hypothesis was coined in respect to the singer Bob Marley. Marley's lyrical and song compositions in the reggae genre were used to describe hope for those experiencing social oppression, using his music as a medium for prophetic social criticism. Marley is considered a popular singer and social icon rather than a social critic, as discourse around values and ideas are constantly changing and shifting. His social influence grew after he used his music to spread the Rastafari religion in response to Jamaican activist Marcus Garvey, who advocated on the ideologies of black nationalism and Pan-Africanism.

Scholars perceive three major shifts at the macro level that influenced these racial perceptions within the United States. This includes the civil rights movement which emerged during the 1960s, the changes in the immigration policy in 1965 that led to an increased rate of Hispanic and Asian immigrants, and the economical and political stability within less developed countries that led to mass migration. As the ethnic identity of Americans gradually shifted during these three macro shifts, the social discourse surrounding racist behavior and prejudices took place. The following increase in diversity also increased negative responses to issues surrounding race and immigration among Americans.

=== Follow-up study ===
A follow-up study was conducted by scholars Courtney M. Bonam, Vinoadharen Nair Das, Brett R. Coleman, and Phia Salter, who underwent two major social experiments in a conceptual replication of Nelson, Adams, and Salter's work to further analyse the Marley hypothesis. Study 1 analysed the responses of 111 European Americans and 43 African Americans, both from a racially diverse university. A similar pattern was seen with the original research were European Americans showed a lower understanding and knowledge of historical events involving racism. Their work emphasizes how a strong racial identity among the European Americans may further implement their denial towards systemic racism. Study 2 shows how people who had learned about the housing policy in U.S. history regarding its impact on African American ghettos had a higher level of acknowledgement towards systemic racism.

The study revolves around the concepts of prejudice and discrimination shaping one's perspectives on the outlook of racist occurrences. These are built from social rules and norms behind socially shared ideas within a specific group. Especially for the case of racism, prejudice is observed as being socio-historically constructed. As a result, the social environment and historical racial events linking European Americans to racism is proposed to color how they perceive certain acts of racism. A lack of exposure to environments outside an individual from the privileged group, especially regarding personal, micro-level interactions with the minority group, can strengthen a certain bias or stereotype. This perception strongly depends on the position a certain group is within the social structure. The prejudice towards the African American community is likely to cause widespread social exclusion and devaluation, in comparison to the European American community where the attributions to prejudice focuses more on localized reasons. The problem within this pattern is discussed to be how it impacts self-perception and assumed discrimination. These factors contribute to shaping perceptions on the current racist events placed in front of them. Social experiments found that the interpretation of discriminatory situations placed in front of people were influenced and shaped by subjective factors like personal interests and the level of interactions with other social subgroups. Disadvantaged groups are led to assume an inevitable discriminatory treatment towards them when placed within a wide range of social situations. However, the lower rate of discriminatory events privileged groups are faced with leads them to attribute their self-perceptions with an acknowledgement that treatment infrequently ends in a negative way. The differences in self-perceptions surrounding the consistency of discrimination emerging from prejudices means that groups at a lower social position may be more psychologically affected. Scholars propose that the prejudice held towards members of a minority group causes significantly higher damage to their psychological health, in comparison to more privileged groups.

== Sexism ==
The social pattern seen analysed in the Marley hypothesis is paralleled in other social groups, including gender. Scholars Diane Kobrynowicz and Nyla R. Branscombe discuss a similar case to the Marley Hypothesis with the idea that victims of gender discrimination and social status views this idea differently. They expand on the thesis that perceptions of discrimination are shaped by the different structures of privileged and disadvantaged groups. This social experiment aims to predict how different levels of self-esteem and perceptions of sexism can shape how an individual responds to cases of gender discrimination, by observing a sample of 138 female and 157 male students. Their pattern of behavior is analysed to understand a common observation that privileged groups, in comparison to disadvantaged groups, are given more positive outcomes because they are a member of a group holding higher positions of power in the root of the social structure.

The gender discrimination within the workplace is often analysed through the disparities with wage and work position inequalities. Sociological scholars propose that cognitive, perceptual, and behavioral prejudices are prevalent within the workplace, impacting workplace factors like wages, promotions, or given roles and responsibilities. This is seen to emerge from influenced perceptions from workers due to the stereotyping of gender roles. Some scholars propose that African Americans display a higher sympathetic awareness of sexist occurrences because they are often exposed to a similar situation of prejudice and discrimination in the social environment. This can influence how they perceive gender discrimination in the workplace. Another subgroup who exhibits higher awareness surrounding sexist events is proposed to be generally younger people due to generational influences, where they tend to show a stronger sense of idealism and social justice for a more progressive society than the older generation.

== Replication ==
In 2018, Jason E. Strickhouser, Ethan Zell, and Kara E. Harris published their attempt at replicating the Marley hypothesis and found a smaller difference between European Americans' and African Americans' perceptions of racism, as well as no difference between European American participants and African American participants when it came to knowledge on historical racism. The research team conducted two social experiments in a conceptual replication of the original study in different institutional and regional contexts with 228 European American students and 192 African American students. In one experiment, the effect of participants' race on their perception of racism was a third of the size compared to the prior studies' findings on isolated racism and around half for systemic racism, while another experiment found effect sizes that were a quarter of the original studies' regarding isolated racism and a third of the original studies' for systemic racism. Additionally, findings did not demonstrate that African American participants had significantly better knowledge of historical racism compared to European American participants. The research team concluded that while the Marley hypothesis did not replicate fully across all contexts, White Americans may have increased knowledge of historical racism and increased perceptions of racism when they have more frequent contact with Black Americans.

== See also ==
- Contact hypothesis – Psychological hypothesis about intergroup contact
- Sociology of race and ethnic relations
