= Transformative mediation =

Transformative mediation describes a unique approach to conflict intervention that was first articulated by Robert A. Baruch Bush and Joseph P. Folger in 1994 in The Promise of Mediation. It has been the subject of much study, research and development ever since.

== Overview ==
As summarized by Della Noce, Bush & Folger (2002), the transformative approach to mediation practice takes an essentially social / communicative view of human conflict. According to this model, a conflict represents first and foremost a crisis in some human interaction—an interactional crisis with a somewhat common and predictable character. Specifically, the occurrence of conflict tends to destabilize the parties' experience of both self and other, so that the parties interact in ways that are both more vulnerable and more self-absorbed than they did before the conflict. Further, these negative dynamics often feed into each other on all sides as the parties interact, in a vicious circle that intensifies each party's sense of weakness and self-absorption. As a result, the interaction between the parties quickly degenerates and assumes a mutually destructive, alienating, and dehumanizing character. For most people, according to transformative theory, being caught in this kind of destructive interaction is the most significant negative impact of conflict. However, the transformative model posits that, despite conflict's potentially destructive impacts on interaction, people have the capacity to change the quality of their interactions to reflect relative personal strength or self-confidence (the empowerment shift) and relative openness or responsiveness to the other (the recognition shift). Moreover, as these positive dynamics feed into each other, the interaction can regenerate and assume a constructive, connecting, and humanizing character. The model assumes that the transformation of the interaction itself is what matters most to parties in conflict – even more than settlement on favorable terms. Therefore, the theory defines the mediator's goal as helping the parties to identify opportunities for empowerment and recognition shifts as they arise in the parties' conversation, to choose whether and how to act upon these opportunities, and thus to change their interaction from destructive to constructive (Bush & Pope, 2002).

In transformative mediation, success is measured not by settlement per se but by party shifts toward personal strength, interpersonal responsiveness and constructive interaction. As parties talk together and listen to each other, they build new understandings of themselves and their situation, critically examine the possibilities, and make their own decisions. Those decisions can include settlement agreements, but no one is coerced into any decision or agreement. The outcomes are entirely in the parties’ own hands and subject to their own choices. Effective mediator practice is focused on supporting empowerment and recognition shifts, by allowing and encouraging party deliberation and decision-making, and inter-party perspective-taking, in various ways. A competent transformative mediator practices with a microfocus on communication, identifying opportunities for empowerment and recognition as those opportunities appear in the parties' own conversations, and responding in ways that provide an opening for parties to choose what, if anything, to do with them.

The transformative framework is based on and reflects relational ideology, in which human beings are assumed to be fundamentally social—formed in and through their relations with other human beings, essentially connected to others, and motivated by a desire for both personal autonomy and constructive social interaction (Bush & Folger, 1994; Della Noce, 1999).

== Components of transformative mediation theory ==
- Definition of conflict: Conflict is a crisis in human interaction
- Empowerment: The ability or movement towards being able to deliberate and/or make a decision in the conflict interaction.
- Recognition: The ability to hear the other party and/or start to hear their perspective in the conflict interaction.

=== Ten hallmarks ===
1. "The opening statement says it all." (This hallmark describes the importance of the mediator's role to orient the parties towards empowerment and recognition.)
2. "It's ultimately the parties' choice." (This statement shows the power of the parties to determine what happens in a mediation.)
3. "The parties know best." (The parties have all the knowledge of what has come before and have a better idea of what should happen.)
4. "The parties have what it takes." (The parties have the capacity to make decisions and to take perspectives. They are better able to determine what should happen than the mediator.)
5. "There are facts in the feelings." (Feelings may be a part of what the parties want to discuss. They should not be discouraged from being a part of the parties interaction.)
6. "Clarity emerges from confusion." (As people have a conversation about their conflict, they will gain clarity as they become empowered and they allow recognition to surface.)
7. "The action is in the room." (The important part of the conversation is who is there in the moment. Mediators should remain focused on the here and now.)
8. "Discussing the past has value to the present." (Mediators should be responsive to parties discussion of the past. It has relevance to the discussion.)
9. "Conflict can be a long-time affair." (Mediators should look at a conflict as more than the resolution of a moment. It can be one point in a long sequence of events.)
10. "Small steps count." (Empowerment and recognition can take place even in very small steps. Each step should be recognized.)

=== Principles of transformative mediators ===
A transformative mediator should be able to:

1. Be comfortable with conflict, including strong emotion and negative communication patterns.
2. Respect the choices of the parties, including their choice to participate in the mediation. This should be done even if the mediator does not personally agree with the choice the parties are making.
3. Be comfortable with a limited understanding of the parties' conflict.
4. Respect the parties, even if their actions, appearance, language, and attitudes seem completely different from those of the mediator.
5. Be patient with the parties and the process of their interaction.
6. Focus on the moment by moment events in the parties' interaction.
7. Attend to empowerment and recognition opportunities.
8. Choose interventions (and non-interventions) based upon opportunities for party empowerment and/or recognition.
9. Relinquish problem solving and control of the process.

== See also ==
- Intergroup dialogue
