= Journal of Applied Social Psychology =

- Discipline: Social Psychology
- Language: English
- Edited by: Richard J. Crisp

Publication details
- History: 1971-present
- Publisher: Wiley-Blackwell
- Frequency: Monthly
- Impact factor: 1.231 (2016)

Standard abbreviations
- ISO 4: J. Appl. Soc. Psychol.

Indexing
- ISSN: 0021-9029 (print); 1559-1816 (web)

Links
- Journal homepage; Online access; Online archive

The Journal of Applied Social Psychology is a monthly peer-reviewed academic journal. The journal was established in 1971 by Professor Dr. Siegfried Streufert at Purdue University who edited the Journal for the first ten years. Its current editor-in-chief is Richard J. Crisp (Aston University). The journal is devoted to applications of experimental research to the problems of society (e.g. health, safety, gender, law). It was published by Bellwether Publishing until 2006, when it was acquired by Wiley-Blackwell.

According to the Journal Citation Reports, the journal has a 2016 impact factor of 1.231, ranking it 44th out of 62 journals in the category "Psychology Social".
