= Intergroup dialogue =

Intergroup dialogue is a "face-to-face facilitated conversation between members of two or more social identity groups that strives to create new levels of understanding, relating, and action". This process promotes conversation around controversial issues, specifically, in order to generate new "collective visions" that uphold the dignity of all people. Intergroup dialogue is based in the philosophies of the democratic and popular education movements. It is commonly used on college campuses, but may assume different namesakes in other settings.

== History ==
Intergroup dialogue is rooted in "philosophical and cultural traditions that have valued dialogue as a method of communication and inquiry" to explore shared issues. These traditions heavily influenced 20th century movements for democratic education, which included intergroup dialogue as a core objective. The application of dialogue in education was a core tenet of the democratic education movement, drawing on the work of public intellectuals like John Dewey who in the first decades of the 20th century envisioned "schools as social centers" that "educate youth for democratic citizenship". Dewey and other advocates of democratic education at the time envisioned dialogue as "the practice of deliberative democracy".

In 1932, Myles Horton, a popular-education thinker, co-founded the Highlander Research and Education Center—one of the earliest U.S. mainstream examples of a community center that offered dialogue, "popular education and literacy ... as a means of promoting civic participation and social action organizing".

Later, the intergroup education movement in the 1940s and 1950s built upon Gordon Allport's intergroup contact theory. This movement was a response in part to 20th-century U.S. political turmoil and social changes. The Great Migration, which was the rapid internal movement of African Americans from the rural South to the industrial North, contributed to considerable social unrest within the United States. Similar effects were felt in the Southwest with the mass migration of Mexican Americans following World War II.

In Brazil in the 1960s, Paulo Freire, who would become a core figure in popular education, adopted a theoretical approach to intergroup dialogue that emphasized the importance of people's own experiences, and the need to build dialogue capacity to enable people to "analyze their situation and take action to transform themselves and their conditions". Freire's writings about "dialogue as a liberatory educational practice", such as his book Pedagogy of the Oppressed, influenced many educators throughout the Western Hemisphere to emphasize critical consciousness of social inequalities through "antibias, antiracist, multicultural, or social justice education".

All of these ideas and practices, combined with those of thinkers such as John Paul Lederach and Harold H. Saunders about conflict transformation and peacebuilding, have formed the foundation for intergroup dialogue. The growing popularity of intergroup dialogue programs on college campuses coincided with other theoretical developments in higher education, including, for instance, the integration of critical race theory into law and other fields.

== Method ==
=== Goals ===
Intergroup dialogue is intended to build relationships amongst participants with different social identities through the use of personal storytelling, empathetic listening and interpersonal inquiry. It integrates three core educational goals: "consciousness raising, building relationships across differences and conflicts, and strengthening individual and collective capacities to promote social justice". Intergroup dialogue distinguishes its approach from other dialogic methods such as debate and discussion:

- Debate aims to clarify pros and cons of issues, to develop critical thinking skills.
- Discussion aims to generate different perspectives on issues, to consider decisions among different options.
- Intergroup dialogue aims to increase critical self-awareness and social awareness, to increase intergroup communication, understanding and collaborative actions.

=== Characteristics ===
The following table contrasts the characteristics of debate, discussion, and dialogue:

In debate we...	In discussion we try to..	In dialogue we...
Succeed or win; Defend our opinion; Stress disagreement; Deny other's feelings; Discount the validity of feelings; Listen with a view of countering; Judge other viewpoints as inferior, invalid or distorted; Use silence to gain an advantage; Disregard relationships	Present ideas; Enlist others; Persuade others; Acknowledge feelings, then discount them as inappropriate; Listen for places of disagreement; Achieve preset goals; Avoid silence; Retain relationships	Broaden our own perspective; Express paradox and ambiguity; Find places of agreement; Explore thoughts and feelings; Listen with a view to understand; Challenge ourselves and other's preconceived notions; Honor silence; Build relationships; Ask questions and invite inquiry

=== Multi-partiality ===
Intergroup dialogue draws the work of Paulo Freire whose work focuses on consciousness raising, a process through which members of an oppressed group come to understand the history and circumstances of their oppression. Intergroup dialogue further aims to raise the consciousness of all participants, including those from advantaged and disadvantaged groups, through the use of multi-partial facilitation. This approach was developed by Janet Rifkin, professor at the University of Massachusetts Amherst, as a method of conflict resolution, and was adopted by the Program on Intergroup Relations at the University of Michigan as a method of facilitating dialogue across difference of social identity.

A multi-partial approach to facilitation differs from both a neutral or impartial approach, as well as a model in which the facilitator acts as an advocate, such as in many feminist models. Multi-partial facilitation posits the presence of "dominant narratives" within dialogue, or sets of assumptions and beliefs based on socialization and cultural values. If the facilitator were to be impartial and neutral in moments of conflict between dialogue participants, the dominant narrative would affirm the experiences and voices of the dominant group members and further marginalize the experience of marginalized participants. A multi-partial facilitation approach differs from facilitator-advocate approaches in that it is equally invested in the participation and growth of all dialogue participants; it encourages self-reflection and awareness through engagement rather than direct confrontation, an approach based on the belief that "people who are not feeling threatened are more open to discussing their feelings and interests and are more open to discussing the effects the conflict is having on both groups". Rather than directly confronting a group member's bias, a multi-partial facilitator points out the dominant narrative when evidence of it arises, and encourages group members to share their experiences, while simultaneously encouraging a critical analysis of the underlying assumptions and narratives at play.

Counseling psychologist Derald Wing Sue said that instructors who have not done the work of reflecting on themselves racially or culturally tend to be poor facilitators of discussions about race. Gaining critical racial consciousness through self-exploration, as well as exploration of the experiences of other racial groups, is a prerequisite for claiming an antiracist stance and for successfully leading race talks, according to Sue. According to education professor Ximena Zúñiga, the number one competency for facilitators—alongside small-group leadership skills—is having a deep understanding of their own social identities as well as the social identities of others.

== In secondary schools and colleges ==
Universities worldwide offer intergroup dialogue programs to their students. Intergroup dialogue programs are frequently launched as part of larger campus diversity and social justice initiatives seeking to address tensions and conflict related to social identity, most centrally, race. Campuses vary in their approach to intergroup dialogue, "tailor[ing] to the specific needs of the campus, school, academic department or student affairs unit that it serves". Dialogue groups are generally housed in on-campus organizations or academic departments, included as course offerings in social work, sociology, psychology, American studies, peace and conflict studies and education. Students enrolled in intergroup dialogue coursework are typically required to complete supplementary readings, reflections, papers and in some cases, field work.

Teacher Matthew R. Kay, writing for secondary school teachers, has advocated for establishing a safe space in classrooms where students can comfortably talk about controversial topics; "authentic listening" is essential.

== Evaluation and outcomes ==
Research shows that intergroup dialogue has positive impacts on participants' understanding of diversity and social justice issues. After conducting a qualitative interview study with dialogue participants, Anna Yeakley found that connecting through a "depth of personal sharing" has been shown to play a significant role in creating positive dialogue outcomes, while participants who "disconnected" in response to hurtful intergroup conflicts reported negative outcomes. Yeakley highlighted the importance of facilitator training, and found that five facilitation skills are essential to promoting positive outcomes:

1. creating a safe space,
2. recognizing signs of negative processes,
3. encouraging and supporting depth of personal sharing,
4. engaging conflicts as teachable moments, and
5. attending to identity differences in awareness and experience.

== See also ==
- Dialogue
- Dialogue mapping
- Diversity ideologies
- Group dynamics
- Intercultural communication
- Intercultural dialogue
- Intergroup anxiety
- Intergroup relations
- Mediation
- Prejudice
- Social identity theory
- Study circle
- Sustained dialogue
- Transformative mediation
