= Imagined contact hypothesis =

The imagined contact hypothesis is an extension of the contact hypothesis, a theoretical proposition centred on the psychology of prejudice and prejudice reduction. It was originally developed by Richard J. Crisp and Rhiannon N. Turner and proposes that the mental simulation, or imagining, of a positive social interaction with an outgroup member can lead to increased positive attitudes, greater desire for social contact, and improved group dynamics. Empirical evidence supporting the imagined contact hypothesis demonstrates its effectiveness at improving explicit and implicit attitudes towards and intergroup relations with a wide variety of stigmatized groups including religious minorities, the mentally ill, ethnic minorities, sexual minorities, and obese individuals. Researchers have identified a number of factors that influence the effectiveness of the imagined contact hypothesis including vividness of the imagery and how typical the imagined outgroup individual is. While some researchers question the effectiveness of the imagined contact hypothesis, empirical evidence does suggest it is effective at improving attitudes towards outgroups.

== Theoretical background ==
The imagined contact hypothesis is derived from Gordon Allport's contact hypothesis, which states that contact between groups is an effective means of reducing prejudice and intergroup conflict. In Allport's seminal work The Nature of Prejudice he suggested that contact at the "fantasy level" may also be an effective means of reducing prejudice. Crisp and Turner cite Allport's work as a strong influence on their imagined contact hypothesis. In addition, the imagined contact hypothesis is linked to the extended contact hypothesis which states intergroup attitudes may be improved simply by learning that other in-group members have out-group friends; the imagined contact hypothesis is also similar in terms of the hypothesized cognitive processes described in the parasocial contact hypothesis.

The imagined contact hypothesis is also influenced by cognitive psychology, particularly work on mental imagery which suggesting that imagining scenarios can induce emotion and motivation similar to real-life and is important to directing goal related behavior. Research from stereotypes also indicates that imagining a counter-stereotypical person, such as an assertive woman, reduces activation of implicit stereotypes. This research all supports the core proposition of the imagined contact hypothesis, that imaging an interaction with an outgroup member can improve attitudes and behaviors towards the outgroup as a whole.

== Overview ==
The imagined contact hypothesis proposes that imagining a positive social interaction with an outgroup member, will lead to a variety of beneficial outcomes, namely an increase in positive attitudes towards the outgroup and greater intention to engage with outgroup members. This paradigm is viewed as particularly useful for improving intergroup relations when intergroup contact may be difficult or impossible (e.g., war or settings where few minorities exist). Notably, the imagined contact hypothesis is not meant to replace intergroup contact but instead be a first step to establishing better relations. Overall, a meta-analysis of over 70 studies demonstrated a small effect size (d+ = 0.35) for imagining a positive interaction with an outgroup member improving outcomes across attitudes, emotions (i.e., feelings of anxiety), behaviors (i.e., self-disclosure to outgroup members, number of outgroup friends) and intentions (i.e., future desire to contact or engage with outgroup members).

The general experimental paradigm used to test the effects of the imagined contact hypothesis utilizes two sets of instructions. In the basic paradigm, participants are placed via random assignment in either a control or an experimental condition. In the control condition participants are instructed:

"We would like you to take a minute to imagine an outdoor scene. Try to imagine aspects of the scene (e.g., it is a beach, a forest, are there trees, hills, what's on the horizon."

Alternative variations include imagining positive social interactions with another non-outgroup individual.

In the imagined contact condition instructions state:

"We would like you to take a minute to imagine yourself meeting [an outgroup] stranger for the first time. Imagine that the interaction is positive, relaxed and comfortable."

In both conditions, participants are usually given a short time (one to five minutes) to imagine the scenario and then are asked to write a brief description of what they imagined in order to elaborate on the mental imagery.

For the imagined contact condition it is important that the interaction be positive and involve a social element. Indeed, if participants are not directly instructed to imagine a positive interaction there is concern that they may spontaneously imagine a negative interaction, leading to more negative outcomes. The interaction must also involve a social element in order to create a mental script for the participant. Indeed, research indicates that imagining contact versus simply imagining the outgroup member is important to obtain the positive benefits associated with the imagined contact hypothesis.

== Effects and outcomes ==
=== Explicit attitudes ===
In the first test of the imagined contact hypothesis researchers demonstrated that imagining a positive social interaction with an older adult led to greater desire to interact with an older versus younger adults and improved evaluations of gay men. Since this initial test, the imagined contact hypothesis has been associated with improved explicit attitudes towards outgroups such as: religious groups (i.e., Muslims), undocumented immigrants, mentally ill, ethnic minorities and the obese.

=== Implicit attitudes ===
The imagined contact hypothesis paradigm is also effective at improving implicit attitudes towards outgroups. For instance, Turner and Crisp had college-aged participants imagine either a positive social interaction with an older adult or imagine an outdoor scene. They then measured participants implicit attitudes using an Implicit Association Test (IAT). Their results showed that following an imagined interaction with an older adult, college-aged participants were faster to associate positive traits with the "old" category (e.g., stereotypically old names - Arthur, Mildred) compared to participants who imagined an outdoor scene. This pattern of results was replicated with non-Muslim's implicit attitudes towards Muslims using the IAT. Furthermore, the effects of imagined contact on implicit attitudes extend to school aged children, with researchers demonstrating that implicit attitudes towards immigrants improved for children following an imagined contact scenario compared to a control scenario. It has been argued that these demonstrations of implicit attitude change with the imagined contact hypothesis rule out alternative explanations such as the possibility that demand characteristics influence participants' explicit attitudes because implicit attitudes are harder to control.

=== Behavioral intentions ===
The effects of the imagined contact hypothesis extend beyond increasing explicit and implicit attitudes to impact behavioral intentions such as engaging with outgroup members. Researchers showed that having non-Muslim British undergraduate students imagine contact with an outgroup Muslim lead to greater intentions (measured via a Likert scale survey) to engage with Muslims in the future, compared to a control condition. This work has been replicated using a variety of outgroup targets such as ethnic minorities in Cyprus, gay men and asylum seekers. In the cases described, behavioral intention to engage was measured via survey items such as how much do you want to "avoid" or "talk to" an outgroup member. This work has also been replicated in school-aged children. Beyond simply intentions to engage, the imagined contact paradigm also influences social distancing. For example, one study showed that undergraduate participants who first imagined a positive interaction with an obese individual subsequently positioned chairs closer together when they thought they would be interacting and discussing society's perception of obesity with an obese individual.

== Factors influencing effectiveness ==
=== Elaborated imagined contact ===
Husnu and Crisp demonstrated that greater elaboration of the imagined social interaction improved outcomes above and beyond those associated with the traditional imagined contact hypothesis paradigm. Specifically they found that by guiding Non-Muslim undergraduates to imagine contextual factors within the imagined interaction such as when and where the interaction took place improved future intentions to interact with Muslims over and above traditional instructions. Additional research also indicated elaboration increases participants estimated likelihood of befriending elderly individuals. In one of their studies Husnu and Crisp identified that the relationship between elaboration and improved outcomes was mediated by participant's vividness of the imagined scenario. Specifically participants who elaborated on their imagined social interaction reported greater vividness of the social interaction, which subsequently improved outcomes.

== Typicality of the imagined individual ==
Researchers have also investigated how factors about the imagined individual impact outcome measures. Stathi, Crisp, & Hogg had participants imagine either a stereotypical or non-stereotypical individual. Specifically they asked participants to either "imagine meeting a British Muslim stranger for the first time...[who] dresses in a traditional way, avoids alcohol, reads the Koran, and prays five times a day" or "imagine meeting a British Muslim stranger...[who] dresses in "western" clothes, drinks alcohol, eats pork, and does not pray regularly". Their results indicated that imagining a stereotypical individual lead to greater feelings of contact-efficacy, that is how well a future interaction will go. This finding aligns with research on intergroup relations which shows that typicality of members leads to greater generalization effects compared to atypical group members.

=== Individual differences ===
There are many individual level differences that also moderate the effectiveness of imagined contact. For instance, Husnu and Crisp asked participants the extent to which they have contact with British Muslims and found greater real-life contact was associated with higher intentions to engage with Muslims following an imagined contact paradigm. Individuals who feel greater intergroup anxiety also report more difficulty in imaging a positive social interaction with an outgroup member, however, this did not ultimately affect the quality of an interaction with an outgroup member following the imagined contact manipulation. Participants' amount of ingroup identification also impacts the effectiveness of imagining outgroup contact. Individuals who rate they are lower in their ingroup identification show stronger positive outgroup evaluations following imagining contact.

== Psychological processes of imagined contact ==
Two key psychological processes, anxiety and trust, have been identified as potential mechanisms for why imaging outgroup contact is effective for improving intergroup relations. Anxiety often characterizes and is engendered by intergroup encounters. For instance, intergroup contact between African-Americans and European-Americans frequently produces higher levels of intergroup anxiety compared to same-race interactions. Researchers however show that imaging a positive intergroup interaction leads to reductions in anxiety, with anxiety being a mediator between the relationship of imagined contact and improved intergroup attitudes.

Trust is another important mediator between imagined contact and positive intergroup outcomes. In one study, imagining contact with a gay man produced higher levels of trust towards gay men in general which mediated the relationship between imagined contact and positive intergroup attitudes. In the same study, these researchers showed unique contributions of anxiety and trust, with imagined contact increasing intergroup trust leading to lower intentions to avoid the outgroup, and decreasing intergroup anxiety thus increasing approach related behaviors.

== Criticisms ==
While multiple studies have demonstrated the overall positive effects of imagining contact on intergroup attitudes and intergroup behavior, there is some debate about the theoretical importance and application of the imagined contact hypothesis. Some researchers criticized the imagined contact hypothesis as too rooted in the microlevel and laboratory setting, with it unable to address macrolevel social problems of intergroup conflict such as genocide and mass murder. Furthermore, there is criticism that imagining contact is not effective for minorities regarding attitudes and behavioral intentions towards majority group members, particularly if the minority group has experienced high levels of oppression and violence at the hands of the majority group. Lastly, some have critiqued the small effects, potential for demand characteristics to influence results, and short duration of effects.

Crisp and Turner responded to a number of these criticism by acknowledging the limitations of the imagined contact hypothesis and their methodological approach as experimental psychologists. Yet, they argued that experimental evidence is a vital step to understanding and developing empirically tested prejudice reduction strategies. They also argued that evidence of the imagined contact hypothesis improving implicit attitudes counters the possibility of demand characteristics influencing results. Finally, they agreed that a single session in the laboratory may not be enough to improve intergroup attitudes and conflict however suggested that imagining contact represented a first step in a continuum of contact interventions.
