= Edward Schiappa =

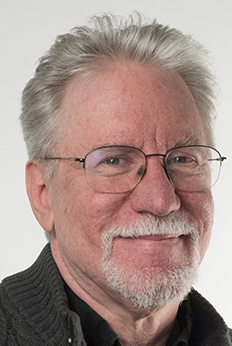
Edward Schiappa, Professor and former Head of Comparative Media Studies/Writing at the Massachusetts Institute of Technology and John E. Burchard Professor of Humanities

Anthony Edward Schiappa, Jr. is an American scholar of communication and rhetoric, currently Professor of Comparative Media Studies/Writing at the Massachusetts Institute of Technology, where he holds the John E. Burchard Chair of Humanities; from 2013 to 2019, he also served as the program's Head. Previously, he spent seventeen years in the Communication Studies Department at the University of Minnesota, the last seven of which he served as chair. He is the author of numerous books and articles that have appeared in classics, communication, English/Composition, philosophy, psychology, and law journals.

== Personal life and education ==
Schiappa was born in Miami, Florida. His father was a journalist who joined the Federal Bureau of Investigation, a fact Schiappa wrote about in 2009. He graduated from Manhattan High School in Manhattan, Kansas, and earned his undergraduate degree at Kansas State University, where he majored in Speech & Theatre. He earned his master's degree (1984) and Ph.D. (1989) from Northwestern University in Communication Studies. He has two daughters, the oldest of whom, Jacqueline Schiappa, completed a Ph.D. in Writing Studies at the University of Minnesota in 2016. She died at the age of 38 in September, 2023. His younger daughter, Lauren Murray, completed an MA in Comparative Culture at International Christian University in Tokyo, Japan, in 2023.

== Recognition ==
- Graduate Research Award, Communication Studies Department, Northwestern University, 1983, 1984, 1985.
- Outstanding Doctoral Dissertation Award, National Communication Association, 1989.
- Outstanding Doctoral Dissertation Award, Communication Studies Department, Northwestern University, 1989.
- Janice Lauer Award for the Best Essay in Volume Ten of Rhetoric Review, “Sophistic Rhetoric: Oasis or Mirage,” 1992.
- National Communication Association, Rhetorical and Communication Theory Division New Investigator Award, 1996.
- National Communication Association, Douglas W. Ehninger Distinguished Rhetorical Scholar Award, 2000.
- Gary Olson Award for the best book in Rhetorical and Cultural Theory, Defining Reality: Definitions and the Politics of Meaning, given by the Association of Teachers of Advanced Composition, 2004.
- Research Fellow, Rhetoric Society of America, 2006.
- National Communication Association, Rhetorical and Communication Theory Division Distinguished Scholar Award, 2006.
- National Communication Association, Distinguished Scholar Award, 2009.
- National Communication Association, Charles H. Woolbert Research Award, 2016.

== Research areas ==
Schiappa has developed influential lines of research in three areas: classical rhetoric, contemporary rhetorical theory and argumentation, and popular culture.

In classical rhetoric, Schiappa's “Did Plato Coin Rhêtorikê?” was published in 1990 in The American Journal of Philology (vol. 111: 460–73), followed by a string of influential essays; these include a widely read exchange with John Poulakos in Philosophy & Rhetoric (1990), “Sophistic Rhetoric: Oasis or Mirage?” (1991), and “Rhêtorikê: What’s in a Name? Toward a Revised History of Early Greek Rhetorical Theory” in Quarterly Journal of Speech (1992).

Schiappa's contribution to classical rhetoric is premised on a re-dating of the origins of the Greek word for rhetoric, rhêtorikê. Schiappa argues that the word cannot be found in a surviving text that predates Plato's Gorgias from the early 4th century BCE. Accordingly, he critiques treatments of 5th century BCE authors, especially the Older Sophists, that assume what he calls a “disciplinary sense” of Rhetoric. He argues that their conceptual focus was on the word logos, which is broader and less specialized than the term rhêtorikê was to become in later use. Schiappa justifies his methodological approach in part based on the writings of Thomas S. Kuhn, who argued that historians of science must respect the lexicon used in a particular historical context, as well as the writings of Eric Havelock, who argued that the major contribution of early Greek thinkers have been misunderstood by relying on later-developed vocabularies.

Schiappa has produced four books on classical rhetoric, and his reexamination of the origins of rhetorical theory has been influential. Classicist Victor Bers (Yale University) observed that there are two “camps” of classical rhetoric scholars—“one situated in classical studies, the other in departments of English or Communication. I think Edward Schiappa is the only scholar widely known to both groups” (Bryn Mawr Classical Review 2005.08.38).

His work in contemporary rhetoric and argumentation is primarily concerned with what he calls “definitive discourse.” His work on definitions dates to 1985 and his oft-cited “Rhetoric of Nukespeak” essay appeared in Communication Monographs in 1989. His 2003 book, Defining Reality: Definitions and the Politics of Meaning, has become a key source for scholars analyzing definitional arguments and rhetoric. In his 2022 book The Transgender Exigency: Defining Sex & Gender in the 21st Century, Schiappa examines the key sites of definitional debate including schools, bathrooms, the military, sports, prisons, and feminism, drawing attention to the political, practical, and ethical dimensions of the act of defining sex and gender.

Schiappa's work analyzing popular culture criticism as argumentation began in 1998 and has culminated in a provocative 2008 book, Beyond Representational Correctness: Rethinking Criticism of Popular Media. In it, Schiappa argues that scholars interested in the “effects” of popular media or who wish to determine a text's cultural meaning would develop stronger analyses if they would engage in audience research. He also argues that the notion of ideal “representational correctness” of different groups of people is misguided and an impossible goal.

In collaboration with Peter B. Gregg and Dean E. Hewes, Schiappa advanced the Parasocial Contact Hypothesis in 2005. That theory explains how positive media portrayals of minority groups can reduce prejudice among viewers, especially for viewers without real-world contact with such minorities. The theory has been cited widely and won the National Communication Association's 2016 Woolbert Award as work "that has stood the test of time and has become a stimulus for new conceptualizations of communication phenomena.”

Schiappa has utilized a diverse set of methods in his work, including translation of ancient Greek, scansion of Greek prose, formalization of arguments, one-shot surveys, and controlled lab experiments involving pre/post-tests and various statistical analyses.

== Books ==
- Protagoras and Logos: A Study in Greek Philosophy and Rhetoric (Columbia: U. of South Carolina Press, 1991).
- Editor, Landmark Essays on Classical Greek Rhetoric (Mahwah, NJ: Lawrence Erlbaum, 1994).
- Editor, Warranting Assent: Case Studies in Argument Evaluation (Albany: State University of New York Press, 1995).
- Squeeze Play: The Campaign for a New Twins Stadium (Minneapolis: Minnesota Public Advocacy Research Report, 1998).
- The Beginnings of Rhetorical Theory in Classical Greece (New Haven: Yale University Press, 1999).
- Protagoras and Logos: A Study in Greek Philosophy and Rhetoric, Second Edition (Columbia: U. of South Carolina Press, 2003).
- Defining Reality: Definitions and the Politics of Meaning. (Carbondale: Southern Illinois University Press, 2003).
- Beyond Representational Correctness: Rethinking Criticism of Popular Media (Albany: State University of New York Press, 2008).
- Professional Development During Your Doctoral Education. (Washington, D.C.: E-book from the National Communication Association, 2009).
- With David Timmerman, Classical Greek Rhetorical Theory and the Disciplining of Discourse (Cambridge: Cambridge University Press, 2010).
- With John Nordin, Keeping Faith With Reason: A Theory of Practical Argumentation. (NY: Pearson Custom Publishing, 2013).
- With David M. Timmerman, & Giles Laurén, eds. Jebb’s Isocrates (Charleston, SC: Sophron, 2016).
- The Transgender Exigency: Defining Sex & Gender in the 21st Century (London: Routledge, 2022).
- With John P. Nordin, Argumentation: Keeping Faith with Reason (Routledge, 2024).
- Argumentation: The Key Concepts (Routledge, 2025).
