= Polyculturalism =

Ideological approach

Polyculturalism is an ideological approach to the consequences of intercultural engagements within a geographical area which emphasises similarities between, and the enduring interconnectedness of, groups which self-identify as distinct, thus blurring the boundaries which may be perceived by members of those groups.

The concept of polyculturalism was first proposed by Robin Kelley and Vijay Prashad. It differs from multiculturalism which instead emphasises the separateness of the identities of self-identifying cultural groups with an aim of preserving and celebrating their differences in spite of interactions between them. Supporters of polyculturalism oppose multiculturalism, arguing that the latter's emphasis on difference and separateness is divisive and harmful to social cohesion.

Polyculturalism was the subject of the 2001 book Everybody Was Kung Fu Fighting: Afro-Asian Connections and the Myth of Cultural Purity by Vijay Prashad.

== Comparison of cultural ideologies ==
Like advocates of multiculturalism, proponents of polyculturalism encourage individuals to learn about different cultures, especially those they may come into contact with in their own areas. However whereas multiculturalism advocates for toleration between members of distinctly different cultures groups, polyculturalism is less rigid and acknowledges that individuals shape their own identities and may choose to change so as to express their culture in a different way to their own ancestors, either by adding elements of other cultures to it or by eliminating aspects of it.

Polyculturalism views the concept of race as a social construct with no scientific basis, however it recognises the concept of ethnicity, considering ethno-nationalism a barrier which must be transcended in the pursuit of a dynamic community culture.

Critics of multiculturalism argue that it entrenches identity politics while polyculturalism aims to forge a common new identity

Polyculturalism acknowledges that cultures are dynamic, interactive and impure while multiculturalism treats them as static, isolated and complete.

== Polycultural Religion ==
Jacob S. Dorman used polyculturalism in his 2013 book Chosen People: The Rise of American Black Israelite Religions (Oxford University Press, 2013). Working with the idea as sketched by Kelley and Prashad, Dorman theorized polyculturalism as a preferable alternative to constructs such as syncretism and hybridity, which look at racial cultures in particular as silos rather than porous and constantly reconstructed by intercultural and interracial contact.

He wrote: "polyculturalism jettisons the old, evolutionary, and biological metaphors that characterized even the most culturally-minded of the older anthropologists, and instead embraces a concept of cultures that are multiple, unheirarchical, unbounded, and “impure.” He continued: "Polycultural bricolage offers the possibility of discussing cultural formation, including religious innovation, without the essentialist, holistic, and hostile binaries of syncretic acculturation – or even the holism of transculturation. Rather, polyculturalism suggests that cultures are not bounded systems but fluid, multivalent processes, constructed by many individual bricoleurs who work by recombining old and new, familiar and foreign, in a process that takes advantage of similarities between cultures and is not so much conflictual, inevitable, or mechanical as it is creative, imaginative, and innovative within recognizable “grammatical” patterns."

== Examples of polycultural states ==
=== Revolutionary France ===
The different successive polities over the last two centuries in France has tried various policies in intercultural relations, creating much research material for Citizenship Studies.

The French Revolution was ground-breaking in its de-emphasis of religious and other cultural distinctions. On 27 August 1789, the National Constituent Assembly issued the Declaration of the Rights of Man and of the Citizen. On 27 September 1791, the National Constituent Assembly voted to give France's Jewish population equal rights under the law. That a long-scapegoated minority were to be recognised simply as citizens regardless of their religion was unprecedented in Modern Europe.

Debates about citizenship, equality, and representative politics among intellectuals defined the Age of Enlightenment, and played a role in the shaping of political thinking in early America and France on the eve of the Revolution in 1789. Radical components of the Republican movement in France coalesced around the Jacobin Club in early 1790. One of their objectives was: To work for the establishment and strengthening of the constitution in accordance with the spirit of the preamble (that is, of respect for legally constituted authority and the Declaration of the Rights of Man and of the Citizen).

The political views of the Jacobin Movement were rooted in Jean-Jacques Rousseau's notion of the social contract. The promotion and inculcation of civic values and the sense of nationhood became consolidated in France. A common identity for the peoples within France's natural boundaries of the Alps, Jura mountains, Pyrenees, the river Rhine and the Atlantic coast was successfully cultivated and propagated. France's regional identities were presented as parts of a wider whole in an effort to create common bonds across a much larger territorial area.

=== Socialist Yugoslavia ===
In the new socialist countries that arose in the 20th century religious and other cultural distinctions were played down in an effort to promote a new shared common citizenship. The capacity to satisfactorily facilitate cultural autonomy in poly-ethnic societies without reinforcing divisions and thereby weaken the state had exorcised socialist intellectuals from as far back as Otto Bauer in his 1907 book "The Nationalities Question and Social Democracy".

Edvard Kardelj, the constitutional architect of Socialist Federal Republic of Yugoslavia, had set out to delicately de-escalate the often fractious 'national question' in the Balkans. The 1946 Yugoslav Constitution was heavily influenced by the 1936 Constitution of the Soviet Union, another poly-ethnic socialist state. Kardelj pointed out: "For us the model was the Soviet Constitution, since the Soviet federation is the most positive example of the solution of relations between peoples in the history of Mankind."

The development of a Yugoslav socialist consciousness was further clarified in the 1953 Constitutional Law. The law referred to "all power in the FPRY belongs to the working people". The emphasis on class was an obvious effort to supersede individual ethnic and religious differences. The constitutional changes were explained by the gathering development of new "unified Yugoslav community".

In the practise of socialist self-management the establishment of a powerful body like the Council of Producers (Serbo-Croatian: Vijeće proizvođača) instead of a Council of Nationalities appeared to confirm the post-nationalist atmosphere the populations of Yugoslavia had entered.

The developing moves from a Yugoslav citizenship to a Yugoslav ethnicity was greatly aided by the mutual comprehensibility of many of the ethnic groups in the region. Even after Yugoslavia was dismantled there is much agreement about this shared linguistic heritage as can be seen in the Declaration on the Common Language.

== See also ==
- Civic engagement
- Classical republicanism
- Consociationalism
- New Soviet man
- Soviet people
- Social engineering (political science)
- Yugoslavs
- Czechoslovaks
