= Intergroup anxiety =

Discomfort from interacting with an outgroup

Intergroup anxiety is the social phenomenon identified by Walter and Cookie Stephan in 1985 that describes the ambiguous feelings of discomfort or anxiety when interacting with members of other groups. Such emotions also constitute intergroup anxiety when one is merely anticipating interaction with members of an outgroup. Expectations that interactions with foreign members of outgroups will result in an aversive experience is believed to be the cause of intergroup anxiety, with an affected individual being anxious or unsure about a number of issues. Methods of reducing intergroup anxiety and stress including facilitating positive intergroup contact.

== Causes ==
Widely theorized causes of intergroup anxiety are based on the feeling that interactions will have negative consequences. These can be grouped as follows:

- Negative evaluations from the outgroup, often for failing to be aware of and demonstrate appropriate behaviors that are congruent with the outgroup's social norms or possibly being rejected or mocked by members of the outgroup
- Negative evaluations from the ingroup, e.g., possibly being ostracized from one's own ingroup for associating with members of an outgroup
- Negative psychological outcomes for the self, such as feeling uncomfortable or being deemed prejudiced
- Negative behavioral outcomes for the self stemming from the belief that members of an outgroup are potentially dangerous and pose a threat to oneself and others

The amount of anxiety one feels in such an instance is hypothesized to vary according to a variety of personal factors. Negative prior relations between groups predict more intergroup anxiety, and one's own experiences with individual members of the outgroup can affect anxiety about interaction with others from the group (often more salient if they are negative). Negative evaluations of outgroups often incorrectly stem from personal interactions due to a generalization from interpersonal contact to intergroup contact. The subsequent lack of positive contact results in negative expectancies of upcoming intergroup contact, leading to anxiety, heightened hostility, and a desire to avoid this contact. This cycle limits the possibility for positive contact.

Another factor that predicts intergroup anxiety is a strong level of identification with one's ingroup. This ethnocentrism can cause ingroup members to look down upon outgroup members, yielding negative interactions. Imbalance of power in the specific situation can also increase anxiety. Linkage between intergroup anxiety and resulting intergroup hostility is likely, as individuals typically experience aversion to stimuli that arouse negative emotions.

== Consequences ==
Intergroup anxiety is particularly worthy of attention as its implications are apparent through various research findings. An average correlation of r=.46 exists between intergroup anxiety and prejudice, suggesting a notable relationship between the two. Furthermore, intergroup anxiety has been found to correspond with decreased frequencies of interactions with an outgroup, lower levels of contact with members of an outgroup, the utilization of negative stereotypes of outgroup members, and negative intergroup contact. Because ingroup members experiencing anxiety are motivated to avoid contact with outgroups, they rely on stereotypes in assessing their few interactions, often judging the entire outgroup to be homogeneous. Suffering this anxiety at all can cause ingroup members to instantly dislike outgroup members and to view interactions as more negative than they were. These perceptions can lead to discrimination, hostility, and continued anxiety in outgroup contact situations.

Anxiety causes exaggerated behaviors in many intergroup contact situations, often leading to overly aggressive behavior. However, anxiety can also manifest itself in the opposite manner: anxious ingroup members may act overly friendly in an attempt to avoid seeming ignorant or prejudiced. Such unnatural behavior can add to the distrust felt by ingroup and outgroup members, causing the interaction to be negatively perceived. This phenomenon is not confined to majority group members; intergroup anxiety is also felt by minority groups interacting with the majority. For example, reported attitudes of African Americans, Hispanic Americans, and Asian Americans toward White Americans include intergroup anxiety. This trend is also reflected in nationality group members' ratings of one another, with higher levels of intergroup anxiety resulting in more negative ratings.

Another notable characteristic of intergroup anxiety is its self-reinforcing nature, promoting behaviors that keep it actively present. The phenomenon motivates one to avoid contact with outgroup members, or at least make it as short as possible. Anxiety causes even necessary contact to be marred by lack of full attention. Additionally, even outgroup-initiated behaviors will not necessarily force positive interactions upon anxious ingroup members. The fact that these interactions have been initiated by the group inspiring anxiety has been shown to cause ingroup members to perceive them as overly negative. These factors consequentially extinguish the opportunity to have a positive experience with the perceived outgroup. Such positive experiences are the crucial component needed to undermine negative expectations and stereotypes.

Simply the presence of anxiety may play a role in exacerbating tensions between groups. When an outgroup member can tell that an ingroup member is experiencing anxiety, it has been shown that the contact becomes tenser and is perceived less favorably by both groups. This finding would be discouraging of continued intergroup contact among the anxious, but another study suggests that it may not have this consequence. Ingroup members tend to be significantly better than outgroup members at detecting other ingroup members' anxiety. This finding would suggest that anxiety is better hidden than its sufferer thinks, and that the subsequent negative perception of the interaction is purely mental and can be overcome.

== Anxiety reduction ==
The main idea on which intergroup anxiety research is founded is that facilitating positive intergroup contact leads to a reduction in intergroup anxiety. Most research methodology relies not on actually bringing groups together, but instead on having individuals imagine contact with an outgroup. Imagination exercises alone have proven not only to be an accurate predictor of future behavior, but also to reduce intergroup anxiety without any actual contact. This finding holds steady even when study participants are especially high in anxiety or ideologically intolerant of people from the other outgroup.

Gordon Allport's intergroup contact theory is the basis for this line of research into intergroup anxiety reduction. The theory hypothesizes that only groups meeting under four conditions will succeed in reducing intergroup anxiety among their members: groups must be of equal status, work towards common goals, experience intergroup cooperation, and have the support of authorities, laws, or customs. Since then, other researchers have found more factors that predict reduced intergroup anxiety. Interactions including a possibility of friendship have been shown to be more effective, particularly when that potential is reinforced by mutual self-disclosure, a characteristic usually absent in strained intergroup contact. Situations facilitating the forging of a common ingroup identity are also commonly used to avoid and reduce intergroup anxiety, and are often accompanied by the additionally helpful development of empathy between groups. Activities or the imagination of scenarios involving cooperation between groups can also reduce anxiety. Most importantly, it is critical that these reduction exercises take place in a society that fundamentally supports peaceful and successful intergroup contact.

== See also ==
- Intergroup bias
- Intergroup dialogue
- Minority stress
- Weathering hypothesis
