= Strategic alignment =

Strategic alignment is a process that ensures an organization's structure, use of resources (and culture) support its strategy. "In its simplest form, organizational strategic alignment is lining up a business' strategy with its culture." Successful outcomes also require an awareness of the wider environment, regulatory issues and technological change. Strategic alignment contributes to improved performance by optimizing the operation of processes/systems, and the activities of teams and departments. Goal-setting theory supports the relevance of clear, measurable operational objectives that can be linked to superordinate goals. This helps ensure resources are used effectively.

The concept of strategic alignment is significant in the context of a global business environment where activities need to be coordinated across regions and time zones. Strategic alignment encompasses all the domains, operations and activities connected to an organization. Examples are alignment between business strategy and IT, aligning different marketing channels, alignment of human resources, ... . This strategic alignment process may extend to organizations and groups that are connected to the organization, such as business partners.

When all the organization's components are correctly aligned, it can have a positive impact on financial performance, decision-making effectiveness, resource efficiency and overall organizational performance.

== Basic Concept ==
At its core, strategic alignment is the process of achieving compatibility, consistency, and harmony between an organization's strategy and overarching goals, its internal structures, resources and operations. It is not a one-time event, it is a continuous process of adaptation and change. An organization can maximize its performance, value creation and competitive advantage when its internal workings are adapted to the external environment and the strategic priorities. A lack of alignment can lead to wasted resources, internal conflict or less-then-optimal performance.

== Integration of IT and Business Strategy ==
Information Technology (IT) plays a significant role in business operations, supporting functions such as communication, data management and operational process. Businesses may integrate IT systems with their wider organisational strategies to improve efficiency and support decision-making. Developments in IT have also enabled new business models including e-commerce and digital platforms.

== Superordinate Principles ==
Creating operational alignment involves translating an organization's Superordinate Goals and overall strategy into the more immediate objectives of a team or department. In addition to reviewing systems and processes, leaders also need to develop the skills, competencies and motivation of people in the organization. The McKinsey 7s Framework provides an overview of this type of analysis, highlighting elements that contribute to alignment. This type of review, with follow-up interventions, contribute to key activities (linked to products and services) meeting customer and stakeholder expectations. At the same time, effective internal systems ensure the best use of resources, which contributes to future success.

Strategic Alignment requires awareness of Superordinate Principles that may include the 3BL "triple bottom line" perspective. This emphasizes criteria that take account of Planet, People & Profit (3P Thinking). It raises issues relating to Corporate Governance, which now include social and environmental considerations. KPMG make the point: "Businesses not taking ESG seriously are beginning to lose customers, employees and financing; eventually they will become unviable."

There are two main models of corporate governance, (i) the shareholder model, which prioritizes the return on investment for investors, and (ii) the stakeholder model that also emphasizes a responsibility towards other groups and wider considerations. Guiding principles relating to Environmental, Social and Corporate Governance (ESG) is at the heart of the new thinking.

== Trevor and Varcoe ==
In an article in Harvard Business Review (May 2016), Jonathan Trevor and Barry Varcoe suggest two questions. These prompt reflection on strategic alignment.

1. How well does your business strategy support the fulfilment of your company's purpose?
2. How well does your organization support the achievement of your business strategy?

Findings suggest that both elements contribute to performance. The article notes that (alignment) 'also leads to a more positive work climate, above-average staff engagement, a strong commitment to values and few(er) energy-sapping turf wars and in-fighting'. (ibid)

== See also ==
- Superordinate Goals that are linked to an organization's Vision and Mission Statement
- Strategy Markup Language (StratML), whose purposes include facilitating strategic alignment through the establishment of literal linkages among performance indicators and the strategic goals and objectives they support.
- Environmental scanning
- Competition
- Sustainability reporting
- Business strategy alignment and the secrets of strategic planning
