= Contact hypothesis =

Psychological hypothesis about intergroup contact

In psychology and other social sciences, the contact hypothesis suggests that intergroup contact under appropriate conditions can effectively reduce prejudice between majority and minority group members. Following World War II (1939–1945) and the desegregation of the military and other public institutions, policymakers and social scientists had turned an eye toward the policy implications of interracial contact. Of them, social psychologist Gordon Allport united early research in this vein under intergroup contact theory.

In 1954, Allport published The Nature of Prejudice, in which he outlined the most widely cited form of the hypothesis. The premise of Allport's hypothesis states that under appropriate conditions, interpersonal contact could be one of the most effective ways to reduce prejudice between majority and minority group members. According to Allport, properly managed contact should reduce issues of stereotyping, prejudice, and discrimination that commonly occur between rival groups and lead to better intergroup interactions.

In the decades following Allport's book, social scientists expanded and applied the contact hypothesis toward the reduction of prejudice beyond racism, including prejudice toward physically and mentally disabled people, women, and LGBTQ+ people, in hundreds of different studies.

In some subfields of criminology, psychology, and sociology, intergroup contact has been described as one of the best ways to improve relations among groups in conflict. Nonetheless, the effects of intergroup contact vary widely from context to context, and empirical inquiry continues to this day.

== History ==
While Gordon W. Allport is often credited with the development of the contact hypothesis, the idea that interpersonal contact could improve intergroup relations was not a novel one. In the 1930s and 1940s, writers had already begun speculating about the outcomes of interracial contact. In 1947, sociologist R. M. Williams described interpersonal collaboration with goal interdependence as a worthwhile strategy to reduce intergroup hostility.

Following WWII, social scientists examined the effects of desegregation on racial attitudes in the U.S. Merchant Marine, and in desegregated New York City housing projects. In 1951, as national attention turned to issues of desegregation in schools, ultimately leading up to Brown v. Board of Education, Robert Carter and Thurgood Marshall, from the NAACP Legal Defense and Educational Fund, solicited expert opinions from social science. A range of social scientists, from Kenneth Clark to Floyd and Gordon Allport, weighed in on the psychological effects of desegregation, and conditions under which interracial contact might attenuate racial prejudice, including an amicus curiae brief filed in the Brown v. Board case.

Other studies have claimed that contact hypothesis is very simple and optimistic and that contact would most likely gravitate toward hostility rather than friendship if two competitive parties were involved. If groups with a negative outlook were brought together, it would lead to increases of negative attitudes rather than positive.

Allport situated his formulation of the contact hypothesis in broader discussion of racial diversity—a precursor to interracial proximity and contact. While diversity more generally might foment conflict and prejudice, Allport suggested that contact, under four particular conditions, would facilitate intergroup understanding and consequently reduce prejudice.

== Conditions of intergroup contact ==
In the years prior to Allport's framing of intergroup contact theory, social scientists had already begun discussing the conditions of intergroup contact that would produce intergroup anxiety, prejudice, or other "detrimental psychological effects". Wilner, Walkley, and Cook, two years prior to The Nature of Prejudice, studied segregation and integration in housing projects, and also suggested four conditions under which intergroup attitudes would change for the better. Under the assumption that prejudice arises from racial segregation, they suggested that it would diminish when members occupy "the same or equivalent roles in the situation," share background characteristics (like education, age, gender, or socioeconomic status), perceive common interests or goals, and when the "social climate […] is not unfavorable to interracial association."

Concurrently, Carolyn Sherif and Muzafer Sherif developed their Robbers Cave experiment, an illustration of realistic conflict theory. The Sherifs highlighted the importance of superordinate goals and equal status between groups, but notably, did not weigh in alongside other social scientists in their amicus brief for Brown v. Board of Education.

In Allport's own words,

"[Prejudice] may be reduced by equal status contact between majority and minority groups in the pursuit of common goals. The effect is greatly enhanced if this contact is sanctioned by institutional supports (i.e., by law, custom, or local atmosphere), and provided it is of a sort that leads to the perception of common interests and common humanity between members of the two groups."

— Gordon W. Allport, The Nature of Prejudice (1954)

In other words, four conditions under which intergroup contact will reduce prejudice are:

- Equal status. Both groups must engage equally in the relationship. Members of the group should have similar backgrounds, qualities, and characteristics. Differences in academic backgrounds, wealth, skill, or experiences should be minimized if these qualities will influence perceptions of prestige and rank in the group.
- Common goals. Both groups must work on a problem/task and share this as a common goal, sometimes called a superordinate goal. This goal can only be attained if the members of two or more groups work together by pooling their efforts and resources.
- Intergroup cooperation. Both groups must work together for their common goals without competition. Groups need to work together in the pursuit of common goals.
- Support of authorities, law, or customs. Both groups must acknowledge some authority that supports the contact and interactions between the groups. The contact should encourage friendly, helpful, egalitarian attitudes and condemn ingroup-outgroup comparisons.

Additionally, Allport specified that within intergroup cooperation, personal interaction, involving informal, personal interaction between group members would scaffold learning about each other and the formation of cross-group friendships. Yet, without these conditions, casual or superficial contact would cause people to resort to stereotypes.

The largest meta-analysis of the contact literature suggested that the conditions are facilitating but not essential. However, more recent meta-analysis highlights that many configurations of the conditions have not yet been experimentally tested.

== Psychological processes involved in intergroup contact ==
A number of psychological processes have been hypothesised to explain how and why intergroup contact is able to reduce prejudice and improve intergroup relations. First, Allport (1954) argued that intergroup contact facilitates learning about the outgroup, and this new outgroup knowledge leads to prejudice reduction. Second, intergroup contact is believed to reduce the fear and anxiety people have when interacting with the outgroup, which in turn reduces their negative evaluations of the outgroup. Third, intergroup contact is hypothesised to increase people's ability to take the perspective of the outgroup and empathize with their concerns. Empirical research has only found weak support for role of outgroup knowledge in prejudice reduction; however, the affective mechanisms of intergroup anxiety and outgroup empathy have accumulated extensive empirical support.

The reduction of prejudice through intergroup contact can be described as the reconceptualization of group categories. Allport (1954) claimed that prejudice is a direct result of generalizations and oversimplifications made about an entire group of people based on incomplete or mistaken information. The basic rationale is that prejudice may be reduced as one learns more about a category of people. Rothbart and John (1985) describe belief change through contact as "an example of the general cognitive process by which attributes of category members modify category attributes" (p. 82). An individual's beliefs can be modified by that person coming into contact with a culturally distinct category member and subsequently modifying or elaborating the beliefs about the category as a whole.

However, contact fails to cure conflict when contact situations create anxiety for those who take part. Contact situations need to be long enough to allow this anxiety to decrease and for the members of the conflicting groups to feel comfortable with one another. Additionally, if the members of the two groups use this contact situation to trade insults, argue with each other, resort to physical violence, and discriminate against each other, then contact should not be expected to reduce conflict between groups. To obtain beneficial effects, the situation must include positive contact.

== Effects of intergroup contact ==
Social scientists have documented positive effects of intergroup contact across field, experimental, and correlational studies, across a variety of contact situations, and between various social groups. Pettigrew and Tropp's canonical 2006 meta-analysis of 515 separate studies found general support for the contact hypothesis. Furthermore, their analysis found that face-to-face contact between group members significantly reduced prejudice; the more contact groups had, the less prejudice group members reported. Moreover, the beneficial effects of intergroup contact were significantly greater when the contact situation was structured to include Allport's facilitating conditions for optimal contact. Recent evidence also suggests that intergroup contact can buffer the development and transmission of prejudicial attitudes by attenuating the influence of broader societal attitudes as well as parental and peer socialization.

=== Examples ===
==== Prejudice toward African Americans ====
The majority of intergroup contact research has focused on reducing prejudice toward African Americans. For example, in one study, Brown, Brown, Jackson, Sellers, and Manuel (2003) investigated the amount of contact white athletes had with black teammates and whether the athletes played an individual or team sport. Team sports (e.g., football or basketball), as opposed to individual sports (e.g., track or swimming), require teamwork and cooperative interactions to win. Results showed that white athletes who played team sports reported less prejudice than athletes who played individual sports.

==== Prejudice toward gay people ====
The contact hypothesis has proven to be highly effective in alleviating prejudice directed toward homosexuals. Applying the contact hypothesis to heterosexuals and homosexuals, Herek (1987) found that college students who had pleasant interactions with a homosexual tend to generalize from that experience and accept homosexuals as a group. Herek and Glunt's (1993) national study of interpersonal contact and heterosexuals' attitudes toward gay men found that increased contact "predicted attitudes toward gay men better than did any other demographic or social psychological variable" (p. 239); such variables included gender, race, age, education, geographic residence, marital status, number of children, religion, and political ideology. Herek and Capitanio (1996) found that contact experiences with two or three homosexual individuals are associated with more favorable attitudes than are contact experiences with only one individual.

==== Prejudice toward transgender people ====
The findings from a 2009 study by Mark E. King, PhD and his colleagues supported the contact hypothesis for reducing prejudice toward transgender people, in a studied Hong Kong population. Walch et al. (2012) found a significant reduction in prejudice following viewership of a transgender speaker panel. In 2020, professor Jordan R. Axt and colleagues found an association between tested subjects' results in "a novel Implicit Association Test (IAT) assessing implicit attitudes toward transgender people", and their beliefs about transgender people, as well as their contact with transgender people. However, Cheso et al. (2024) suggested contact has a larger effect in reducing prejudice toward transgender people depending on certain factors, such as the level of knowledge about transgender people, and the level of contact quality. Findings from Fitzgerald et al. (2023) suggested that intergroup contact with lesbian, gay, or bisexual people also had "secondary transfer effects" that reduced prejudice against transgender people.

==== Prejudice toward immigrant groups within the United States ====
Daniel J. Hopkins presented the idea that local conditions within a community or changes in local immigrant demographics can affect the attitudes of people on immigrants. This can include the stereotyping of immigrants and/or a development of pro- or anti-immigrant ideas. These attitudes may be shaped by experiences the non-immigrant population has with the immigrant population. He believes that this idea is not necessarily universal, but that certain conditions play a role on the development of attitudes.

==== Prejudice toward Muslims in Europe ====
In their study from the Netherlands, Savelkoul et al. (2011) found that people living in regions with high numbers of Muslims (i.e., those more exposed to unavoidable intergroup contacts) get used to and are more experienced with their integration and express lesser perceived threats. In addition, they also found that higher contacts with Muslim colleagues directly reduce anti-Muslim attitudes. Similarly, Novotny and Polonsky's (2011) survey among Czech and Slovak university students documented that personal contacts with Muslims and experience with visiting an Islamic country associated with more positive attitudes toward Muslims. However, Agirdag et al. (2012) reported that Belgian teachers working in schools that enroll a larger share of Muslim students have more negative attitudes toward Muslim students than other teachers.

==== Intergroup contact and social robots ====
Evidence suggests that intergroup contact theory may be applicable to social robots. Exposure to a social robot under predictable, controlled conditions can lead people to feel more positive toward that specific robot than they previously felt toward robots in general. Additionally, research has shown that even imagining interacting with a robot can reduce negative feelings.

== Indirect intergroup contact ==
An important advance in research on intergroup contact is the growing evidence for a number of indirect, non-face-to-face intergroup contact strategies as a means to improve relations between social groups. While the benefits of direct intergroup contact have been empirically established, its implementation is often not practical. For example, in many countries, racial and religious groups are often residentially, educationally, or occupationally segregated, which limits the opportunity for direct contact. However, even when the opportunity for direct intergroup contact is high, anxiety and fear can produce a negative or hostile contact experience or lead to the avoidance of the contact situation altogether.

Indirect forms of intergroup contact include:

=== Extended contact ===
The extended contact hypothesis, established by Wright and colleagues in 1997, posits that knowing that a member of one's own group has a close relationship with a member of an outgroup can lead to more positive attitudes toward that outgroup. Correlational research has demonstrated that individuals who report knowledge that an ingroup member has an outgroup friend typically report more positive outgroup attitudes, while experimental research has shown that providing ingroup members with this information creates the same positive effect.

In the 20 years since its proposal, the extended contact hypothesis has guided over 100 studies, that generally find support for the positive effect of extended contact on prejudice reduction, independent of direct friendship with outgroup members.

=== Parasocial contact ===
In a similar vein, vicarious contact involves simply observing an ingroup member interact with an outgroup member. For example, positive media portrayals of intergroup interactions in film, television, and radio, also known as the parasocial contact hypothesis, have the potential to reduce the prejudice of millions of viewers and listeners.

=== Imagined contact ===
The imagined contact hypothesis was put forward by Richard J. Crisp and Rhiannon Turner (2009) and proposes that simply imagining a positive encounter with a member or members of an outgroup category can promote more positive intergroup attitudes. It also proposed that imagined contact can lead to a greater desire to have social contact between groups and can help improve explicit or implicit biases toward marginalized or minority groups, such as those who are mentally or physically disabled, religious minorities, ethnic minorities, and sexual minorities.

=== Electronic- or E-contact ===
Fiona White and her colleagues (2012; 2014) developed Electronic- or E-contact. E-contact involves an ingroup member interacting with an outgroup member over the Internet and includes text-based, video-based, or a mixture of both text- and video-based online interactions. Electronic contact has been empirically shown to reduce inter-religious prejudice between Christian and Muslim students in Australia in both the short and long term, as well between Catholic and Protestant students in Northern Ireland. In the context of sexual prejudice, research also has shown that interacting online with a member of the outgroup is particularly useful as a prejudice-reduction strategy among individuals who typically report ideologically intolerant beliefs. Additionally, in the context of mental health stigma, participants who experienced a brief interaction with a person diagnosed with schizophrenia reported reduced fear, anger, and stereotyping toward people with schizophrenia in general compared to a control condition.

In the Latin American context, Rodriguez-Rivas et al. (2021) demonstrated a positive impact on the reduction of stigma toward people with mental illness in Chilean university students, following participation in a multi-component online program that incorporated electronic contact (E-contact) via videoconferencing with a person diagnosed with schizophrenia.

In the Afghanistan context, Sahab et al. (2024) studied whether using an AI-powered software agent as a facilitator for intergroup electronic contact led to better interactions and reduced prejudice between rival ethnic groups. The findings suggest that using an AI-assisted chatbot in intergroup E-contact can enhance interaction and reduce interethnic prejudices and hostility among Afghanistan's ethnic groups.

== Criticisms ==
While large bodies of research have been devoted to examining intergroup contact, social scientific reviews of the literature frequently voice skepticism about the likelihood of contact's optimal conditions occurring in concert, and by extension, about the generalizability of correlational research and lab studies on contact.

=== Null findings and gaps in research ===
Though the general findings of intergroup contact research have inspired promise, Bertrand and Duflo (2017) found that observational correlations between intergroup contact and non-prejudiced behavior can be explained by self-selection: less prejudiced people seek out contact. Comparatively, fewer controlled experimental studies of intergroup contact exist; of those that do, few measure prejudice outcomes longer than one day after treatment, leaving a gap in the literature that investigates the long-term effects of contact. Furthermore, of these experiments, none measure the reduction of racial prejudice in people over the age of 25. Similarly, in a report to the United Kingdom Equality and Human Rights Commission, Dominic Abrams highlights "a dearth of good-quality longitudinal research on prejudice or prejudice reduction".

Gordon Allport himself suggested that in light of increasing racial contact in the U.S., "the more contact the more trouble", unless scaffolded by the four facilitating conditions he proposed, distinguishing casual contact and "true acquaintance" or "knowledge-giving contact". In political science, Allport's work is often juxtaposed with V.O. Key's examination of Southern politics, which found that racism grew in areas where the local concentrations of black Americans were higher. In that context, with Allport's specific conditions absent, contact comes to produce more negative effects, namely increasing prejudice. Some social psychologists have converged with political scientists on this position. Daniel J. Hopkins presented the idea that local conditions within a community (specifically changes in local immigrant demographics) can affect the attitudes of people on immigrants. This can include the stereotyping of immigrants and/or a development of pro- or anti-immigrant ideas. These attitudes may be shaped by experiences the non-immigrant population has with the immigrant population. He believes that this idea is not necessarily universal, but that certain conditions play a role on the development of attitudes. Agirdag et al. (2012) reported that Belgian teachers working in schools that enroll a larger share of Muslim students have more negative attitudes toward Muslim students than other teachers. Other studies have claimed that contact hypothesis is a very simple and optimistic and that contact would most likely gravitate toward hostility rather than friendship if two competitive parties were involved. If groups with a negative outlook were brought together, it would lead to increases of negative attitudes rather than positive. Furthermore, ideologies when not motivated by prejudices or negative contacts and attitudes, such as ethnic nationalism, the professed religion or the political standings, do not simply change with greater contact. For example, ecumenism or political collaboration virtually does not operate any religious dogmatic or political ideal or principle change in any of the two rival sides.

=== Negative contact hypothesis ===
Stefania Paolini, Jake Harwood, and Mark Rubin (2010) proposed that intergroup contact may have more negative than positive effects on prejudice, because it makes outgroup members' social group more salient during encounters. This evidence suggests that although negative intergroup contact is more influential than positive intergroup contact, it is also less common than positive contact in real world intergroup encounters, in five central European countries. Research also suggests that people's past experiences with out-group members moderates contact: people who have had positive experiences with out-group members in the past show a smaller discrepancy between the effects of positive and negative contact.

Negative sentiments triggered by proximity are also described as NIMBYism (Not In My Back Yard).

== See also ==
- Betsy Levy Paluck – American psychology professor
- Brown v. Board of Education – Landmark 1954 U.S. Supreme Court decision
- Democratic peace theory – International relations theory
- Desegregation – Process of ending racial segregation
- Gordon Allport – American psychologist (1897–1967)
- Group threat theory
- Habituation – Decrease in a behavioral response to a repeated stimulus
- Intergroup anxiety – Discomfort from interacting with an outgroup
- Intergroup dialogue
- Intergroup relations – Aspect of organizational theory
- Kenneth and Mamie Clark – African-American married psychologist duo
- Marley hypothesis – Psychological theory
- Mere-exposure effect – Psychological phenomenon
- Parasocial interaction – Type of psychological relationship
- Prejudice – Attitudes based on preconceived categories
- Realistic conflict theory – Social psychological model of intergroup conflict
- Stereotype – Generalized belief about people
- Cross-race effect – Cognitive bias on facial recognition
