= Parasocial contact hypothesis =

Influential theory in psychology and media

In psychology and media studies, the parasocial contact hypothesis is that positive portrayals of minority groups in mass media can reduce prejudice in a manner similar to that predicted by the contact hypothesis in social psychology.

Developed by Edward Schiappa, Peter B. Gregg, and Dean E. Hewes in a series of studies conducted at the University of Minnesota, the theory is now widely cited. In 2016 it was recognized with the Woolbert Award of the National Communication Association as work "that has stood the test of time and has become a stimulus for new conceptualizations of communication phenomena."

== Theoretical basis ==
The basic premise of the Contact Hypothesis (also called Intergroup Contact Theory) formulated by Gordon Allport is that prejudice often stems from ignorance and stereotyping, and interpersonal contact under appropriate circumstances can break down such stereotypes and reduce prejudice. As Allport put it, "a differentiated category is the opposite of a stereotype." Thus, the more a person learns about a minority category of people, the more differentiated that category is and the more resistant it is to being reduced to a negative stereotype. The Contact Hypothesis has been supported by decades of research. Thomas Pettigrew and Linda Tropp's meta-analysis of over 700 independent samples confirms the contact hypothesis for a variety of minority groups and conservatively estimates the average correlation between contact and prejudice as -.215 (N > 250,000, p < .0001).

Schiappa, et al. build on the contact hypothesis by integrating research on Parasocial Interaction (PSI), that is, the perceived relationship that audiences develop through mediated encounters with real and fictional characters. Consumers of media feel they get to know the characters they learn about and, in certain circumstances, feel they have a sort of relationship with those characters.

Donald Horton and R. Richard Wohl described communicative interaction that results from the illusion of face-to-face contact between mass mediated performers and their audiences as "parasocial interaction," a sort of "intimacy at a distance". The concept of parasocial interaction became increasingly attractive to mass communication scholars as more active views of the audience emerged in the second half of the 20th century—especially uses and gratification theory—and numerous empirical studies have utilized the idea to explore PSI's antecedents, correlates, and consequences.

The most common way to detect and measure parasocial interaction has been a survey created by Rubin, Perse, and Powell Their survey form, known as the RPP-PSI, treats parasocial interaction as a holistic experience that "may take many forms including seeking guidance from a media persona, seeking media personalities as friends, imagining being part of a favorite program's social world, and desiring to meet media performers."

Many studies have used the RPP-PSI instrument by adapting the items to "favorite soap opera character", "favorite TV character", and for "favorite characters from a just-watched TV program". While these studies specifically rely on an adaptation of the Rubin, Perse, & Powell PSI survey form, other studies draw from the survey form while incorporating other survey instruments to answer, other studies draw from the instrument while incorporating other instruments to answer their research questions, such as wishful identification, audience-persona interaction, the home shopping experience, emotional appraisal, affinity for TV, and perceived realism of TV. In addition to the frequency in which the RPP-PSI instrument has been used or adapted for research, it has been institutionalized via its inclusion in Mass Communication Research Methods as the exemplary measure of PSI.

A meta-analysis published by Schiappa, Mike Allen, and Peter Gregg suggests that the perception of parasocial relationships correlate with the amount of television viewing, affinity for TV viewing, the perception that TV content is real, the attractiveness of characters, perceived similarity with TV characters, and age.

== Critiques of parasocial interaction research ==
Since the introduction of the concept of parasocial interaction, researchers have argued that the original conceptualization of PSI as holistic or unidimensional is flawed and urged a multi-dimensional approach to account for the wide range of responses that media consumers have with mediated characters. Philip J. Auter and Philip Palmgreen expanded RPP-PSI to a 47-item questionnaire and developed a four-factor Audience Persona Interaction Scale, including identification, interest, group identification, and problem-solving abilities. Sood and Rogers (2000) performed content analysis of letters written to a popular "edutainment" program in India and identified five different kinds of audience responses, described as cognitive, affective, and behavioral engagement, and critical and referential involvement. Uli Gleich added three items to the RPP-PSI, which was translated into German, and recommends a three-factor solution for German viewers: companionship, person-program interaction, and empathetic interaction.

Christoph Klimmt, Tilo Hartmann, Holger Schramm proposed a model in which not only is PSI conceptually multidimensional, but there are distinct "levels" of involvement with media personae that need to be measured. Recent scholarship openly challenges the notion that PSI is unidimensional conceptually. A dissertation by Peter B. Gregg provided factor analysis of several studies focusing on parasocial responses and concluded that the specific variables and measures that should be used in future research depend on the aims of particular research projects, and that there is no reason to think that the range of measurable parasocial responses is any less diverse than those resulting from interpersonal contact. Numerous researchers have noted the similarities between how we react to and think of mediated personae (whether fictive or real) and people we meet in person. As Rebecca Rubin and Alan Rubin note, PSI is "grounded in interpersonal notions of attraction, perceived similarity or homophily, and empathy". People use the same communication-related cognitive processes for both mediated and interpersonal contexts, and "people and media are coequal communication alternatives that satisfy similar communication needs and provide similar gratifications" (p. 59). In other words: People make the same sort of analytical and affective judgments about mediated characters as they do with people they meet in real life, such as physical attractiveness, trustworthiness, predictability, perceived similarity (homophily), and likeability.

== Examples of parasocial contact hypothesis research ==
Positive portrayals of minority outgroups can reduce prejudice in one of two ways. The first is usually described as parasocial contact. Such research typically assumes that lack of meaningful interpersonal contact allows for the persistence of negative stereotypes and prejudice. As viewers learn about a minority group by observing positive media representations, they have the opportunity to form more favorable opinions about minority group members in terms of such traits as likeability, perceived similarity, physical attractiveness, predictability, and trustworthiness. The second way to reduce prejudice is by observing other majority group members interact positively with minority group members. This is called vicarious contact or learning, which can help "normalize" the minority group and reduce prejudice.

In both cases, the hypothesized result of learning more about a minority group is to breakdown stereotypes and acquire a more complex set of cognitive schemata associated with that group. A 2020 meta-analysis by Banas, et al., included 79 cases and concluded that "positive mediated contact decreased [prejudice] (r = −.23; 95% CI, −.29 to −.17), whereas negative mediated contact increased prejudicial attitudes (r = .31; 95% CI, .24 to .38)." When comparing parasocial and vicarious contact, the meta-analysis found no significant difference between the two routes; both have been demonstrated to reduce prejudice.

The PCH or similar intergroup contact theory has been utilized in research exploring the potential of mediated contact reducing prejudice toward a variety of minority groups, including the following:

- African Americans: Ramasubramanian (2011), Kim & Harwood (2020).
- Gay men: Schiappa, Gregg, & Hewes (2005, 2006); Ortiz & Harwood (2007); Bond & Compton (2015); Bond (2020).
- Immigrants and refugees: Rosenthal, et al. (2020), Schemer & Meltzer (2019).
- Male transvestites: Schiappa, Gregg, & Hewes (2005).
- Muslim Americans: Abrams, McGaughy, & Haghighat (2018).
- People with bipolar disorder: Wong, Lookadoo, & Nisbett (2017).
- Transgender people: Gillig, et al. (2018); Li (2019, 2021); Orellana, Totterdell, & Iyer (2020).

=== Recent applications and extensions of the parasocial contact hypothesis ===
The potential of new technologies to reduce stigma towards people with mental health problems, such as virtual reality, has been examined. In this regard, a recent systematic review and meta-analysis of randomized controlled trials showed that there are several interventions to reduce stigma towards this population, such as video games, audiovisual simulation of hallucinations, virtual reality and electronic contact with mental health service users. The meta-analysis (n=1832 participants) demonstrated that these interventions had a consistent medium effect on reducing the level of public stigma (d=–0.64; 95% CI 0.31-0.96; p<.001). However, more research is needed in this field to determine the mechanisms of change and their medium- and long-term effects.

Based on the PCH and other social psychological research on stereotypes and social groups, Catalin Brylla has described a series of case studies of documentaries about marginalized groups in order to identify the best documentary narrative practices to reduce stereotypes and prejudice.

== In the Media ==
One example of parasocial contact in the media can be seen in Modern Family. Within this show there are many examples of this theory. Within the show, Mitch and Cam are shown throughout as a committed couple dedicated to raising their daughter. The show's aim is to reduce the stigma surrounding queer families. The show serves as a first point of contact for people who might not have LGBTQ families in their live, creating a positive association. Modern Family also works to reduce the stereotypes surrounding queer families. This can be seen through Mitch and Cam, who throughout the 11 seasons experience many of the same challenges that heteronormative couples do, such as planning a wedding, raising kids, and fighting with siblings. This works to paint the couple in a light familiar to several viewers, to create a positive first exposure to queer families.

Another example of representation is in Season 5, Episode 23/24. In this set of episodes Cam and Mitch get married. The series of episodes showed the process of marriage in a lens that aligns with heteronormative expectations. The show talks about financial troubles, who to invite, who is the best man, family drama, etc. This works to normalize gay marriage through a lens that a majority of people would find acceptable. This show also published these episodes before gay marriage was legal across the country - acting as a catalyst for change and being the representation that many needed.
