= Superordinate goals =

In social psychology, superordinate goals are goals that are worth completing but require two or more social groups to cooperatively achieve. The idea was proposed by social psychologist Muzafer Sherif in his experiments on intergroup relations, run in the 1940s and 1950s, as a way of reducing conflict between competing groups. Sherif's idea was to downplay the two separate group identities and encourage the two groups to think of themselves as one larger, superordinate group. This approach has been applied in many contexts to reduce intergroup conflict, including in classrooms and business organizations. However, it has also been critiqued by other social psychologists who have proposed competing theories of intergroup conflict, such as contact theory and social categorization theory.

In the context of goal-setting theory, the concept is seen in terms of three goal levels. These are classified as subordinate, intermediate and superordinate. An organization's superordinate goals are expressed through its Vision and Mission Statement and support strategic alignment of activities (subordinate and intermediate goals) with the overall purpose (superordinate goals).

== Origin ==
Superordinate goals were first described and proposed as a solution to intergroup conflict by social psychologist Muzafer Sherif. He studied conflict by creating a boys' summer camp for his Robbers Cave experiments. Sherif assigned the participating campers to two separate groups, the blue and red groups. The boys had separate games and activities, lived in different cabins, ate at different tables, and only spent time with their own group. Sherif then introduced competition between the groups, setting up athletic contests between them. This created conflict between the two groups of boys that developed into hostile attitudes towards the other group, pranking, name-calling, shows of group pride, negative stereotyping, and even occasionally physical violence.

In order to reduce the conflict between the two groups of boys, Sherif had first attempted to have both groups spend time together non-competitively. He had also encouraged them to mix and eat meals and play games with boys from the other group. However, the groups remained hostile toward each other. He had also tried to unite both groups against a common enemy, an outside summer camp, in an early version of the experiment. However, this was deemed an inadequate solution as this simply created a new conflict between the new group and the common enemy.

Sherif then introduced superordinate goals as a possible solution to the conflict. These were goals that were important to the summer camp but could only be achieved with both groups working together, such as obtaining water during a water shortage or procuring a film that both groups wanted to see but did not have enough money for. Sherif found that these goals encouraged cooperation between the boys, which reduced conflict between the groups, increased positive beliefs about boys from the other group, and increased cross-group friendships.

== Background ==
Superordinate goals are most often discussed in the context of realistic conflict theory, which proposes that most intergroup conflicts stem from a fight over scarce resources, especially in situations that are seen as zero-sum. Under realistic conflict theory, prejudice and discrimination are functional, because groups are tools used to achieve goals, including obtaining scarce resources that would be difficult to get as an individual. In this case, groups see other groups with similar goals as threats and therefore perceive them negatively. Groups that are both competing for the same limited resource are said to have a negative interdependence. On the other hand, there are groups that benefit from working together on goals that are not zero-sum. In this case, these groups are said to have a positive interdependence.

In order to remove competition between different factions under realistic group conflict theory, it is necessary to have non-zero sum goals that create a positive interdependence within groups rather than a negative interdependence. Superordinate goals can create positive interdependence if they are seen as desirable by both groups but are not achievable by each faction independently.

== Psychological Mechanisms ==
Work in social psychology suggests that superordinate goals differ from single group goals in that they make the larger group identity more salient and increase positive beliefs about everyone in the larger superordinate group.

=== Cooperation and Interdependence ===
Superordinate goals differ from smaller group goals in that they cannot be achieved by a single small group, and thus force multiple groups to work together, encouraging cooperation and penalizing competition. This encourages each group to consider the other group positively rather than negatively, as the other group is instrumental to achieving the common goal. This fosters a sense of positive interdependence rather than negative interdependence.

=== Superordinate Goals and Identity ===
In addition to increasing positive interdependence, having two groups work together on a single superordinate goal makes the larger group identity more salient. In effect, superordinate goals make it more likely that both groups will consider themselves as part of a larger superordinate group that has a common goal rather than two independent groups who are in conflict with each other. In the case of Sherif's summer camp, both groups of boys, the red and the blue, thought of themselves simply as campers when they were working together, rather than as part of the blue or red groups.

=== Ingroups ===
Having both groups consider themselves part of one larger superordinate group is valuable to the reduction of discrimination, because evaluation of members in one's own group tends to be more positive than evaluation of members outside of one's group. However, the two groups do not need to lose their individual identities in order to become part of the superordinate group. In fact, superordinate goals work best to reduce intergroup conflict when both groups consider themselves subgroups that have a shared identity and a common fate. This allows both groups to keep the positive aspects of their individual identities while also keeping salient everything that the two subgroups have in common.

== Rebuttal of Contact Theory ==
Sherif's work on superordinate goals is widely seen as a rebuttal of contact theory, which states that prejudice and discrimination between groups widely exists due to a lack of contact between them. This lack of contact causes both sides to develop misconceptions about those who they do not know and to act on those misconceptions in discriminatory ways. However, Sherif's work showed that contact between groups is not enough to eliminate prejudice and discrimination. If groups are competing for the same limited resources, increasing contact between the groups will not convince the groups to see each other more positively. Instead, they will continue to discriminate, as the boys in Sherif's summer camps did. This is especially true when the groups are of unequal status and one group can control the resources and power.

== Caveats and Critiques ==
=== Longevity ===
The effects of superordinate goals have not always been shown to last beyond the completion of such goals. In Sherif's study, the separate group identities did not dissolve until the end of the camp. The two groups of boys had less hostility toward each other but still identified with their own groups rather than the larger superordinate identity.

=== Zero-Sum Goals ===
In some cases, there are no superordinate goals that can bring together two separate groups. If there really are zero-sum goals that put groups in competition with each other, groups will remain separate and will stereotype each other and discriminate against each other. In some cases, simply the perception that goals are zero-sum, whether they are or not, can increase prejudice. Therefore, not only is there a need for non-zero-sum goals, but they must be perceived as such.

=== Complementarity ===
Superordinate goals are not as effective when both groups are performing similar or the same roles within the group to achieve the goal. If this is the case, both groups may see the other as infringing on their work or getting in the way. It is considered to be more effective to have members of each group playing complementary roles in the achievement of the goal, although the evidence to support this idea is mixed.

=== Absence of Trust or Inequality of Power ===
Some also argue that with an absence of trust, the prospect of working together to achieve a mutual goal may not serve to bring groups to a superordinate identity. In some cases, when there are inequalities of power or a lack of trust among groups, the idea that they must work together and foster trust and positive interdependence may backfire and lead to more discrimination rather than less.

== Competing Theories ==
Social categorization theory and social identity theory differ from realistic group conflict theory in that they suggest that people do not only belong to groups to gain material advantage. Therefore, these theories propose other ways of improving intergroup social relations.

=== Social Categorization Theory ===
Social categorization theory proposes that people naturally categorize themselves and others into groups, even when there is no motive to do so. Supporting this idea is Tajfel's minimal group paradigm, which has shown there is discrimination among groups created in a laboratory that have no history, future, interaction, or motivation. Social categorization suggests that intergroup competition may be a feature of this tendency to categorize and may arise without zero-sum goals. Under Tajfel's paradigm, people will go as far as hurting their own group in order to harm the other group even more. Thus, superordinate goals may not solve all forms of discrimination.

=== Social Identity Theory ===
Social identity theory proposes that not only do people naturally categorize themselves and others, but they derive part of their own identities from being a part of a social group. Being part of a social group is a source of positive self-esteem and motivates individuals to think of their own group as better than other groups. Under social identity theory, superordinate goals are only useful insofar as they make salient the superordinate identity. It is the superordinate identity that is important for reducing intergroup conflict, and not the goals themselves. If the superordinate identity can be made salient without the use of goals, then the goals themselves are not instrumental to reducing conflict.

== Applications ==
Superordinate goals have been applied to multiple types of situations in order to reduce conflict between groups.

=== Jigsaw Classroom ===
Elliot Aronson applied the idea of superordinate goals in Austin, Texas during the integration of the Austin public schools. Aronson used group projects in elementary school classrooms as a way to get white and black children to work together and reduce discrimination. Aronson had teachers assign projects that could only be completed if everyone in the group participated, and had the teachers give group grades. Having children work together and rely on each other for grades fostered positive interdependence and increased liking among the black and white children as well as decreased bullying and discrimination. Additionally, it increased the performance of all the children.

=== Business Organizations and Negotiations ===
Blake and Mouton applied superordinate goals to conflicts in business organizations. They specify that in a business context, the superordinate goals must be attractive to both parties in the organization or negotiation setting. If both parties are not interested in pursuing the goal or believe that they are better off without it, then the superordinate goal will not help to reduce conflict between the groups. Blake and Mouton also suggest that superordinate goals will often be a consequence of their intergroup problem-solving model.

=== Israeli-Palestinian Conflict ===
Herbert Kelman applied superordinate goals to the Israeli-Palestinian conflict to improve relations between members of the two groups. He created problem-solving workshops where Israelis and Palestinians were encouraged to solve together the problems given to them as well as to interact in a positive atmosphere. These workshops often focused on specific problems, such as tourism, economic development, or trade, which allowed both groups to find practical, positive solutions to these problems and improve relations between the groups.

=== Interracial Basketball Teams ===
McClendon and Eitzen studied interracial basketball teams in the 1970s and found that interracial basketball teams where the interdependence of black and white team members was high and the team had a high winning percentage had lower instances of anti-black attitudes among white players and higher preference for integration. However, teams that did not have high interdependence among black and white teammates or high winning percentages did not show reduced prejudice. Additionally, black members of the winning teams did not show more positive attitudes towards their white teammates than the losing teams.
