= Afghan Women's Educational Center =

The Afghan Women’s Educational Center (AWEC) is a nonprofit, nonsectarian, and nonpolitical non-governmental organization (NGO) based in Kabul, Afghanistan. AWEC was founded in 1991 by a group of Afghan women in exile. The organization works on women’s and children’s rights, community development, and access to education and social services in Afghanistan.

== History ==
AWEC was founded in 1991 during a period of political instability in Afghanistan, when the Soviet-backed Afghan government was collapsing and armed factions were competing for power. The organization was established by women’s rights activists living in exile, including Shinkai Kharokail, who later became its director, followed by Kochay Hassan in 2021-2022. The founders aimed to create an organization dedicated to women’s empowerment, education, and social protection.

After the fall of the Taliban regime in 2001, AWEC expanded its activities inside Afghanistan. It developed programs in education, health, vocational education, and humanitarian assistance, and was formally registered as a local NGO with Afghanistan’s Ministry of Economy in 2006. By 2015, the organization had grown from a community center into a national NGO.

== Organizational structure ==
AWEC is registered in Afghanistan as an NGO. Its headquarters is in Kabul. The organization describes itself as nonpolitical and nonsectarian. It is led by an executive director.

== Geographic reach ==
Since 2002, AWEC has carried out projects in numerous provinces, including Logar, Faryab, Kapisa, Khost, Panjshir, Wardak, Kabul, Balkh, Herat, Nangarhar, Kandahar, Badakhshan, Parwan, Paktia, Paktika, Laghman, Nuristan, and Bamyan. The organization currently maintains an active presence in Kabul, Balkh, Herat, Nangarhar, Kandahar, Badakhshan, Parwan, Paktia, Paktika, Laghman, Nuristan, Bamyan.

== Mission and vision ==
AWEC’s mission is to promote the inclusion, protection, and empowerment of Afghan women and children, with a focus on vulnerable groups. Its vision is the creation of an inclusive and just society in which women and children have equal access to opportunities.

The organization’s stated core values are inclusiveness, respect, integrity, accountability, fairness, professionalism, competence, excellence, collaboration, and team spirit.

== Projects ==
AWEC organizes its work across five areas: education and literacy, women’s economic empowerment and livelihoods, humanitarian response, gender-based violence prevention and protection, and access to justice and peacebuilding. In 2021 and 2022, the organization completed 28 projects across more than ten provinces, reaching approximately 292,966 direct beneficiaries and an estimated 1,464,830 indirect beneficiaries.

=== Education ===
AWEC runs education programs for girls, women, and marginalized children across several provinces. In partnership with the Malala Fund, the organization ran a project between 2019 and 2022 to reduce dropout rates among girls in primary and secondary schools in Kabul, Parwan, and Nangarhar provinces. The project included hiring female teachers and holding advocacy meetings with government officials. In Kabul, AWEC ran the Anna’s Educational Center project with Terre des hommes Germany and the Anna Fund, "providing educational, vocational and social support to street-working children and marginalized women". In Paktika province, a project called "RPSA-Tawanmande-Education, promoting peace and providing humanitarian services" provided community-based education classes, vocational training, and peacebuilding activities to internally displaced people, refugees, and marginalized communities. This project was carried out jointly with Aschiana in Afghanistan and the Society for the Protection of the Rights of the Child (SPARC) in Pakistan and funded by terre des hommes Germany.

=== Women's economic empowerment and livelihoods ===
AWEC runs programs to support women’s income generation and small business development. Two embroidery training projects, known as Goldozi-1 and Goldozi-2, were funded by FHI 360 (Family Health International) and the United States Agency for International Development (USAID). The first phase, from 2019 to 2021, provided embroidery and business management training to over 2,100 women in Kabul and Herat provinces. The second phase, planned for 3,100 women across Kabul, Kandahar, Nangarhar, and Parwan, was cut short after its launch in October 2021 due to restrictions following the change of government. A livelihood project called Women Empowering through Enterprise Development (WEED), implemented with CAFOD (Catholic Agency for Overseas Development) in Balkh province, supported women starting businesses, financial literacy, tailoring and poultry farming. In Herat province, AWEC worked with the United Nations Development Programme (UNDP) to provide small grants to 73 small and medium enterprises owned by displaced persons, returnees, and local community members. In Balkh province, separate program with the United Nations Office for Project Services (UNOPS), offered training in marketing, communication, and business negotiation, and connected women entrepreneurs to an online sales platform for Afghan artisans.

=== Humanitarian response ===
AWEC provides emergency assistance in response to conflict, natural disasters, and displacement. In Badakhshan province, two projects with Norwegian Church Aid (NCA) provided water, sanitation, and hygiene services to displaced communities, including the distribution of hygiene kits and construction of water sources. Following a major earthquake in Paktika and Khost provinces in 2022, AWEC provided cash assistance, reconstruction toolkits, and hygiene materials to over 640 families in partnership with NCA. A separate project in Paktika, implemented with CAFOD, was redirected mid-implementation to support earthquake-affected families, providing food kits, hygiene materials, and awareness sessions to over 700 households. In Logar province, AWEC supported 194 flood-affected families with cash assistance for shelter repair and hygiene promotion, also with NCA.

=== Gender-based violence prevention and protection ===
AWEC runs programs to protect women and girls from gender-based violence and to improve their access to basic essential services. Under the Spotlight Initiative, funded by UNICEF (United Nations Children’s Fund) and implemented in Paktia province in two phases between 2021 and 2022, the organization set up safe spaces, established men and boys networks, and trained religious and community leaders on violence against women, girls and children. A project called Catalyzing Change, also with UNICEF, operated in Balkh and Parwan provinces and created 23 safe spaces for women and girls, provided psychosocial support, and connected beneficiaries to health and nutrition services. In Laghman and Nuristan provinces, an Empowerment of Women and Adolescent Groups project with UNICEF established health centers for women and girls and offered life skills and tailoring training.

=== Access to justice and peacebuilding ===
AWEC works to improve access to justice and promote peacebuilding, with a focus on women. The Just Future project, funded by Cordaid through the Netherlands Foreign Embassy and implemented in partnership with The Liaison Office, ran from 2021 to 2025 in Kabul province. It aimed to connect communities with local authorities and support investigations of human rights violations. A second phase in 2022 extended the project to Nangarhar province, focusing on the informal justice system through community dialogues, television and radio discussions, and advocacy events. A peacebuilding project called Bridging the Gaps: National Women Peacebuilding Network, implemented in Partnership with UN Women across Balkh, Herat, Nangarhar, Paktia, Kandahar, and Helmand provinces, built provincial networks connecting women, peace mediators, and young people, with over 2,300 direct and indirect beneficiaries.
