= Hegemonic masculinity =

Concept in gender studies

In gender studies, hegemonic masculinity is a sociocultural practice that legitimizes men's dominant position in society and justifies the subordination of the common male population and women, and other marginalized ways of being a man. Conceptually, hegemonic masculinity proposes to explain how and why men maintain dominant social roles over women, and other gender identities, which are perceived as "feminine" in a given society. It is part of R. W. Connell's gender order theory, which recognizes multiple masculinities that vary across time, society, culture, and the individual. The conceptual beginnings of hegemonic masculinity represented the culturally idealized form of manhood that was socially and hierarchically exclusive and concerned with bread-winning; that was anxiety-provoking and differentiated (internally and hierarchically); that was brutal and violent, pseudo-natural and tough, psychologically contradictory, and thus crisis-prone; economically rich and socially sustained. However, many sociologists criticized that definition of hegemonic masculinity as a fixed character-type, which is analytically limited, because it excludes the complexity of different, and competing, forms of masculinity. Consequently, hegemonic masculinity was reformulated to include gender hierarchy, the geography of masculine configurations, the processes of social embodiment, and the psycho-social dynamics of the varieties of masculinity.

Proponents of the concept of hegemonic masculinity argue that it is conceptually useful for understanding gender relations, and is applicable to life-span development, education, criminology, the representations of masculinity in the mass communications media, the health of men and women, and the functional structure of organizations. Critics argue that hegemonic masculinity is heteronormative, is not self-reproducing, ignores positive aspects of masculinity, relies on a flawed underlying concept of masculinity, or is too ambiguous to have practical application.

== Description ==
The cyclical pattern of how hegemonic masculinity is produced, reproduced, and perpetuated

Terry Kupers of The Wright Institute describes the concept of hegemonic masculinity in these terms:

In contemporary American and European culture, [hegemonic masculinity] serves as the standard upon which the "real man" is defined. According to [R. W.] Connell, contemporary hegemonic masculinity is built on two legs, domination of women and a hierarchy of intermale dominance. It is also shaped to a significant extent by the stigmatization of homosexuality. Hegemonic masculinity is the stereotypic notion of masculinity that shapes the socialization and aspirations of young males. Today's hegemonic masculinity in the United States of America and Europe includes a high degree of ruthless competition, an inability to express emotions other than anger, an unwillingness to admit weakness or dependency, devaluation of women and all feminine attributes in men, homophobia, and so forth.

=== History ===
"Due to social inequalities in Australian high schools, Sociologist Connell introduced the Hegemonic masculinity idea, that takes a look at male roles and their characteristics." These beginnings were organized into an article which critiqued the "male sex role" literature and proposed a model of multiple masculinities and power relations. This model was integrated into a systematic sociological theory of gender. The resulting six pages in Gender and Power by R. W. Connell on "hegemonic masculinity and emphasized femininity" became the most cited source for the concept of hegemonic masculinity. This concept draws its theoretical roots from the Gramscian term hegemony as it was used to understand the stabilization of class relations. The idea was then transferred to the problem of gender relations.

Hegemonic masculinity draws some of its historical roots from both the fields of social psychology and sociology which contributed to the literature about the male sex role that had begun to recognize the social nature of masculinity and the possibilities of change in men's conduct. This literature preceded the Women's Liberation Movement and feminist theories of patriarchy which also played a strong role in shaping the concept of hegemonic masculinity. The core concepts of power and difference were found in the gay liberation movement which had not only sought to analyse the oppression of men but also oppression by men. This idea of a hierarchy of masculinities has since persisted and strongly influenced the reformulation of the concept.

Empirical social research also played an important role as a growing body of field studies documented local gender hierarchies and local cultures of masculinities in schools, male-dominated workplaces, and village communities. Finally, the concept was influenced by psychoanalysis. Sigmund Freud produced the first analytic biographies of men and showed how adult personality was a system under tension and the psychoanalyst Robert J. Stoller popularized the concept of gender identity and mapped its variation in boys' development.

=== Original framework ===
The particular normative form of masculinity that is the most honoured way of being a man, which requires all other men to position themselves in relation to it, is known as hegemonic masculinity. In Western society, the dominant form of masculinity or the cultural ideal of manhood was primarily reflective of white, heterosexual, largely middle-class males. The ideals of manhood espoused by the dominant masculinity suggested a number of characteristics that men are encouraged to internalize into their own personal codes and which form the basis for masculine scripts of behaviour. These characteristics include: violence and aggression, stoicism (emotional restraint), courage, toughness, physical strength, athleticism, risk-taking, adventure and thrill-seeking, competitiveness, and achievement and success. Hegemonic masculinity is not completely dominant, however, as it only exists in relation to non-hegemonic, subordinated forms of masculinity. The most salient example of this approach in contemporary European and American society is the dominance of heterosexual men and the subordination of homosexual men. This was manifested in political and cultural exclusion, legal violence, street violence, and economic discrimination. Gay masculinity was the most conspicuous subordinated masculinity during this period of time, but not the only one. Heterosexual men and boys with effeminate characteristics ran the risk of being scorned as well.

Hegemonic masculinity is neither normative in the numerical sense, as only a small minority of men may enact it, nor in an actual sense, as the cultural ideal of masculinity is often a fantasy figure, such as John Wayne or John Rambo. It also affects the construct and perception of the idealised male body from an exclusively Western perspective. Hegemonic masculinity may not even be the commonest pattern in the everyday lives of men. Rather, hegemony can operate through the formation of exemplars of masculinity, symbols that have cultural authority despite the fact that most men and boys cannot fully live up to them. Hegemonic masculinity imposes an ideal set of traits which stipulate that a man can never be unfeminine enough. Thus, fully achieving hegemonic masculinity becomes an unattainable ideal.

Complicity to the aforementioned masculine characteristics was another key feature of the original framework of hegemonic masculinity. Yet still since men benefit from the patriarchal dividend, they generally gain from the overall subordination of women. However, complicity is not so easily defined as pure subordination since marriage, fatherhood, and community life often involve extensive compromises with women rather than simple domination over them. In this way hegemony is not gained through necessarily violent or forceful means, but it is achieved through culture, institutions, and persuasions.

The interplay of gender with class and race creates more extensive relationships among masculinities. For example, new information technology has redefined middle-class masculinities and working-class masculinities in different ways. In a racial context, hegemonic masculinity among whites sustains the institutional oppression and physical terror that have framed the making of masculinities in black communities. It has been suggested that historically suppressed groups like inner city African-American males exhibit the more violent standards of hegemonic masculinity in response to their own subordination and lack of control. This idea of marginalization is always relative to what is allowed by the dominant group, therefore creating subsets of hegemonic masculinity based on existing social hierarchies.

== Criticisms ==
As the earliest model of this concept grew, so did the scrutiny and criticisms surrounding it. The following principal criticisms have been identified since debate about the concept began in the early 1990s.

=== Underlying concept of masculinity ===
Some have asserted the fundamental idea of masculinity is seen as a flawed concept. Jeff Hearn and Alan Peterson have argued their views on masculinity. Hearn suggested the concept of masculinity is minimizing the concerning issues of male dominance, while Peterson argues the concept is creating a false idea of men, and furthering the separation of genders. The concept of masculinity is said to rest logically on a dichotomization of sex (biological) and gender (cultural) and thus marginalizes or naturalizes the body. Harry Brod observes that there is a tendency in the field of men's studies to proceed as if women were not a relevant part of the analysis and therefore to analyse masculinities by looking only at men and relations among men. Therefore, a consistently relational approach to gender is being called upon.

=== Ambiguity and overlap ===
Early criticisms of the concept raised the question of who actually represents hegemonic masculinity. Many men who hold great social power do not embody other aspects of ideal masculinity. Patricia Yancey Martin criticizes the concept for leading to inconsistent applications sometimes referring to a fixed type and other times to whatever the dominant form is. Margaret Wetherell and Nigel Edley contend this concept fails to specify what conformity to hegemonic masculinity actually looks like in practice. Similarly Stephen M. Whitehead suggests there is confusion over who actually is a hegemonically masculine man. Inspired by Gramsci's differentiation between hegemony as a form of ideological consent and dominance as an expression of conflict, Christian Groes-Green has argued that when hegemonic masculinities are challenged in a society dominant masculinities are emerging based on bodily powers, such as violence and sexuality, rather than based on economic and social powers. Through examples from his fieldwork among youth in Maputo, Mozambique he shows that this change is related to social polarization, new class identities and the undermining of breadwinner roles and ideologies in a neoliberal economy.

=== The problem of realness ===
It has also been argued that the concept of hegemonic masculinity does not adequately describe a realness of power. Øystein Gullvåg Holter argues that the concept constructs power from the direct experience of women rather than from the structural basis of women's subordination. Holter believes in distinguishing between patriarchy and gender and argues further that it is a mistake to treat a hierarchy of masculinities constructed within gender relations as logically continuous with the patriarchal subordination of women. In response to the adverse connotations surrounding the concept, Richard Collier remarks that hegemonic masculinity is solely associated with negative characteristics that depict men as unemotional (see affect display), aggressive, independent, and non-nurturing without recognizing positive behaviours such as bringing home a wage or being a father.

=== The masculine subject ===
Several authors have argued that the concept of hegemonic masculinity is based on an unsatisfactory theory of the subject because it does not rely enough upon discourses of masculinity. Wetherell and Edley argue that hegemonic masculinity cannot be understood as the characteristics that constitute any group of men. To Whitehead the concept fails to specify how and why some heterosexual men legitimate, reproduce, and generate their dominance and do so as a social minority since they are outnumbered by women and other men they dominate. A related criticism also derives from psychoanalysis which has criticized the lack of attention given to how men actually psychologically relate to hegemonic masculinity. For example, Timothy Laurie argues that the hegemonic masculinity framework lends itself to a modified essentialism, wherein the "achievement of masculine goals is frequently attributed to a way of thinking understood as inherent to the male psyche, and in relation to an innate disposition for homosocial bonding".

=== The pattern of gender relations ===
There is considerable evidence that hegemonic masculinity is not a self-reproducing form. Demetrakis Z. Demetriou suggests this is because a kind of simplification has occurred. He identifies two forms of hegemony, internal and external. External hegemony relates to the institutionalization of men's dominance over women and internal hegemony refers to the position of one group of men over all other men. Scholars commonly do not clarify or acknowledge the relationship between the two. This suggests that subordinated and marginalized masculinities do not impact the construction of hegemonic masculinity as much as critics suggest it should.

== Reformulation ==
In one of the most widely cited works analysing the concept, R. W. Connell and James Messerschmidt sought to reformulate their theory of hegemonic masculinity in light of certain criticisms. They readjusted their framework to address four main areas: the nature of gender hierarchy, the geography of masculine configurations, the process of social embodiment, and the dynamics of masculinities.

=== Gender hierarchy ===
Gender hierarchy seeks to explain not only why men hold a superior position to women but how each group influences the other. Studies indicates that forms of masculinity outside the mainstream are strong, even under conditions of marginalization due to race, economic status, physical ability, or sexual orientation. The dominant system of gender norms maintains its authority more through the incorporation of these non-traditional masculinities into its overall narrative. An example would include that of the mainstream adoption of black hip hop culture which was created in response to urban structural inequalities. Another example is that of "protest masculinity", in which local working-class settings, sometimes involving ethnically marginalized men, embodies the claim to power typical of regional hegemonic masculinities in Western countries, but lack the economic resources and institutional authority that underpins the regional and global patterns.

This new emphasis on gender hierarchy seeks to take a more relational approach to women as well. Women are central in many of the processes constructing masculinities, as mothers, schoolmates, girlfriends, sexual partners, wives, and workers in the gender division of labour. Gender hierarchies are affected by new configurations of women's identity and practice so more attention has been given to the historical interplay of femininities and masculinities.

=== Geography of masculinities ===
Masculinity studies consistently highlight shifts in dominant forms of masculinity shaped by local contexts, yet with globalization's rise, the impact of global spaces on masculinity's construction has gained focus. Charlotte Hooper explains how masculinities play out in international relations, while Connell introduced the concept of "transnational business masculinity," characterizing the lifestyle corporate leaders. Because of this, Connell and Messerschmidt have proposed hegemonic masculinities be analysed at three levels: local, regional, and global. The links between these levels are critical to gender politics since interventions at any level giving women more power and representation can influence from the top down or from the bottom up. Additionally, adopting a framework that distinguishes between the three levels allows one to recognize the importance of place without making generalizations about independent cultures or discourses.

=== Social embodiment ===
Social embodiment calls for a more rigid definition of what a hegemonically masculine man is and how the idea is actually carried out in real life. The pattern of embodiment involved in hegemony has been recognized in the earliest formulations of the concept but called for more theoretical attention. This notion continues to manifest itself into many different health and sexual practices such as eating meat or having multiple sexual partners. Marios Kostas writes in Gender and Education that "hegemonic masculinity is also related to professional success in the labour market, which describes the social definition of tasks into as either 'men's work' or 'women's work' and the definition of some kinds of work as more masculine than others". The emergence of transgender issues has made it particularly clear that embodiment be given more focus in reconceptualizations. The circuits of social embodiment may be very direct and simple or may be long and complex, passing through institutions, economic relations, cultural symbols, and so forth without ceasing to involve material bodies.

=== Dynamics of masculinities ===
New theory has recognized the layering and potential internal contradictions within all practices that construct masculinities. This is a departure from a unitary masculinity and focus on compromised formations between contradictory desires or emotions. While these practices may adhere to conventional Western ideas of hegemonic masculinity, this may not necessarily translate into a satisfying life experience. As gender relations evolve and women's movements grow stronger, the dynamics of masculinities may see a complete abolition of power differentials and a more equitable relationship between men and women and between men and other men. This positive hegemony remains a key strategy for contemporary efforts at reforming gender relations. Groes-Green has argued that Connell's theory of masculinities risks excluding the possibility of more gender equitable or "philogynous" forms of masculinity such as those he has identified in Mozambique. He urges social researchers to begin developing theories and concepts that can improve an understanding of how more positive, alternative and less dominant masculinities may develop even if these are always embedded in local gender power relations.

== Lifespan development ==
=== Early childhood ===
Children learn at an early age, mostly through educational and peer interactions, what it means to be a boy and what it means to be a girl, and are quick to demonstrate that they understand these roles. This notion of "doing" gender involves differentiating between boys and girls from the day they are born and perpetuating the discourses of gender difference. The idea of dualism of the genders are misconstrued by dominant ideology and feeds into social norms of masculinity. Children learn and show development of gender identity as an ongoing process, based on social situations. Gendered toys can play a large role in demonstrating the preferred actions and behaviour of young boys in early childhood. The male role is also reinforced by observing older boys and reactions of authority figures, including parents. The promotion of idealized masculine roles emphasizing toughness, dominance, self-reliance, and the restriction of emotion can begin as early as infancy. Such norms are transmitted by parents, other male relatives, and members of the community. Media representations of masculinity on websites such as YouTube often promote similar stereotypical gender roles.

Although gender socialization is well underway before children reach preschool, stereotypical differences between boys and girls are typically reinforced, rather than diminished, by their early educational childhood experiences. Teachers have a large role in reinforcing gender stereotypes by limiting children's choices at this young age, thus not allowing boys to explore their feelings or their understandings about gender freely. This is done through the endorsement of hegemonic masculinity embodying physical domination, strength, competitiveness, sport, courage, and aggression. These gendered performances are based on society's construction of femininity and masculinity in relation to heterosexuality. Heteronormativity is the standard for children; despite their obvious sexual innocence, heterosexuality is ingrained in children in their acting of gender from an early age.

Another factor that contributes to gendered behaviour and roles is the greater visibility, importance, and presence of males than females in literature, and in the language that teachers use for communication and instruction. Male-generic pronouns are a special problem in early childhood settings. A recommended method to help gender barriers disappear is specific training for teachers and more education on the topic for parents. Though, an ultimate conclusion by one author notes that young children know, feel, and think gender despite the wishes of adults to make gender disappear in their lives.

=== Middle childhood ===
A lifespan perspective must be considered when discussing gender normalization. But one must also consider cultural hegemony in this stage of the lifespan as a child develops more of an understanding of their culture and begins to display original ideas of cultural norms as well as social norms. According to the constructivist emphasis, the man/woman dichotomy is not the "natural" state, but rather a potent metaphor in Western cultures. Building social relationships and developing individuality are essential benchmarks for this age of middle childhood, which ranges from eight years old to puberty. A young boy is trying to navigate falling within the social structure that has been laid out for him, which includes interacting with both sexes, and a dominant notion of maleness. The gender environmentalism, which emphasizes the role of societal practices in generating and maintaining gender differentiation, still plays a part in this stage of life, but is possibly more influenced by immediate and close interactions with boys close to their age. The boys organize themselves in a hierarchical structure in which the high-status boys decide what is acceptable and valued – that which is hegemonically masculine – and what is not. A boy's rank in the hierarchy is chiefly determined by his athletic ability.

One site where gender is performed and socialized is in sport. Violent sports such as football are fundamental in naturalizing the equation of maleness with violence. Displays of strength and violence, through sports like football, help to naturalize elements of competition and hierarchy as inherently male behaviour. There is considerable evidence that males are hormonally predisposed to higher levels of aggression on average than females, due to the effects of testosterone. However, the violent and competitive nature of sports like football can only be an exclusively masculine domain if girls and women are excluded from participating altogether. The only means through which women are permitted to participate in football is as the passive spectator or cheerleader, although women do sometimes participate in other violent contact sports, such as boxing.

When a child engages in behaviour or uses something that is more often associated with the opposite sex, this is referred to as crossing gender borders. When gender borders are crossed in adolescence, the children are policed by themselves. Conflicts and disagreements between boys are resolved by name-calling and teasing, physical aggression, and exclusion from the group. This brings confusion to the natural order of building their individualism, and stifles their creativity and freeplay, critical to developing lifelong skills in problem solving and decision making. Another notion which further confuses youth is "multiple masculinities" is introduced where variables such as social class, race, ethnicity, generation, and family status determines how these young men must perform their masculinity. Boys who fail to fit the social norm are forced to enter adolescence having experienced alienation from their social group and marginalized from the social order they strive to achieve in this stage of life.

=== Adolescence ===
The last stage of childhood, adolescence, marks the onset of puberty and the eventual beginning of adulthood. Hegemonic masculinity then positions some boys, and all girls, as subordinate or inferior to others. Bullying is another avenue in which young men assert their dominance over less "masculine" boys. In this bullying schema, adolescent boys are motivated to be at the top of the scale by engaging in more risk taking activities as well. Oftentimes bullying is motivated by social constructs and generalized ideas of what a young man should be. Gendered sexuality in adolescence refers to the role gender takes in the adolescent's life and how it is informed by and impacts others' perceptions of their sexuality. This can lead to gay bashing and other forms of discrimination if young men seem not to perform the appropriate masculinity.

The male gender role is not biologically fixed, yet it is a result of the internalization of culturally defined gender norms and ideologies. In this stage this is an important point as developmental psychologists recognize change in relations with parents, peers, and even their own self-identity. This is a time of confusion and disturbance; they feel influenced as a result of asserted hegemonic masculinity as well as social factors that lead them to become more self-conscious. show that although men need not engage in all masculine behaviour to be considered masculine, enacting in more masculine behaviours increases the likelihood they will be considered more masculine, otherwise known as building "masculine capital". It has been suggested that boys' emotional stoicism leaves them unable to recognize their own and others' emotions, which leaves a risk for developing psychological distress and empty interpersonal skills. Boys in their adolescence are pressured to act masculine in order to fit the hegemonic ideals, yet the possibility of suffering long-term psychological damage as a result looms overhead.

== Media representations ==
The 1995 documentary The Celluloid Closet discusses the depictions of homosexuals throughout film history. In Jackson Katz's film Tough Guise: Violence, Media & the Crisis in Masculinity, he asserts:

We can't show any emotion except anger. We can't think too much or seem too intelligent. We can't back down when someone disrespects us. We have to show we're tough enough to inflict physical pain and take it in turn. We're supposed to be sexually aggressive with women. And then we're taught that if we step out of this box, we risk being seen as soft, weak, feminine, or gay.

== Applications ==
=== Education ===
Hegemonic masculinity can be helpful in education as well. It can help discover a social system that is created between male students. Also why males teachers educate the way they do. This concept has also been helpful in structuring violence-prevention programs for youth. and emotional education programs for boys.

=== Criminology ===
Hegemonic masculinity's impact on criminology is clear, with evidence that males are more likely to engage in a wider range of crimes, from standard offenses to more grave actions, than females, and have a larger presence in white-collar crime. This concept has facilitated the examination of the relationships between masculinities and various crimes. It has been utilized in specific studies on crimes committed by males, including rape in Switzerland, murder in Australia, football hooliganism and white-collar crime in England, and assaultive violence in the United States. Regarding costs and consequences, research in criminology showed how particular patterns of aggression were linked with hegemonic masculinity, not because criminals already had dominant positions, but because they were pursuing them.

=== Media and sports ===
Hegemonic masculinity has also been employed in studying media representations of men. Because the concept of hegemony helps to make sense of both the diversity and the selectiveness of images in mass media, media researchers have begun mapping the relations between different masculinities. Portrayals of masculinity in men's lifestyle magazines have been studied and researchers found elements of hegemonic masculinity woven throughout them. Commercial sports are a focus of media representations of masculinity, and the developing field of sports sociology found significant use of the concept of hegemonic masculinity. It was deployed in understanding the popularity of body-contact confrontational sports which function as an endlessly renewed symbol of masculinity and in understanding the violence and homophobia frequently found in sporting environments. Rugby union, rugby league, American football, and ice hockey, and the prevalence of injuries and concussions in these sports, is a particularly salient example of the impacts of hegemonic masculinity. With the dominant mode of hegemonic masculinity valuing emotionlessness, invulnerability, toughness, and risk-taking, concussions have become normalized. Players have accepted them as simply "part of the game". If a man does not play through a concussion, he risks being blamed for the team's loss, or labelled as effeminate. It is noble to play in pain, nobler to play in agony, and noblest if one never exhibits any sign of pain at all. Coaches buy into this unwritten code of masculinity as well, by invoking euphemisms such as "he needs to learn the difference between injury and pain", while also questioning a player's masculinity to get him back on the field quickly. Players, coaches, and trainers subscribe to the hegemonic model, thus creating a culture of dismissiveness, often resulting in concussions, which can lead to brain diseases like CTE.

=== Health ===
Hegemonic masculinity has been increasingly used to understand men's health practices and determinants. Practices such as playing through physical injuries and risk-taking sexual behaviors, such as unprotected sex with multiple partners, have been studied. The concept has also been used to understand men's exposure to risk and their difficulty in responding to disability and injury. Hegemonic masculine ideals, especially stoicism, emotionlessness, and invulnerability, alongside shame and fear of judgement, can help explain an aversion to seeking mental health care. Men are less likely than women to seek professional services like psychiatrists or counsellors, informal help through friends, and are more likely to report that they would never seek psychotherapy for depression. In fact, men who adhere to the masculine norm of stoicism have difficulty in identifying grief, sadness, or a depressed mood, some of the conventional diagnostic symptoms of depression. Recognition of weakness would be a recognition of femininity, and as such, men distract themselves, avoid the problem, or get angry – one of the few emotions permissible under hegemonic masculine norms – when depressive symptoms surface. On a global scale, the impact of hegemonic masculinity has been considered in determining unequal social and political relations which are deleterious to the health of both men and women.

=== Organizations ===
Hegemonic masculinity has proved significant in organizational studies as the gendered character of workplaces and bureaucracies has been increasingly recognized. A particular focus has been placed on the military, where specific patterns of hegemonic masculinity have been entrenched but have been increasingly problematic. These studies found that negative hegemonically masculine characteristics related to violence and aggression were required to thrive in the military at all ranks and in all branches. Additionally homophobic ideals were commonplace and further subordinated men in these positions. Studies have also traced the institutionalization of hegemonic masculinities in specific organizations and their role in organizational decision making. This can be related to the glass ceiling and gender pay gap women experience.

"Tough guy" attributes like unwillingness to admit ignorance, admit mistakes, or ask for help can undermine safety culture and productivity, by interfering with exchange of useful information. A Harvard Business School study found an intervention to improve the culture at Shell Oil during the construction of the Ursa tension leg platform contributed to increased productivity and an 84% lower accident rate.

=== War, international relations, and militarism ===
Hegemonic masculinity has impacted both conflict and international relations, serving as a foundation for militarism. Charlotte Hooper discusses how U.S. foreign policy, following the Vietnam War, was seen as a way of bolstering America's manhood. It was believed that the Vietcong, often categorized "as a bunch of women and children", had humiliated and emasculated America. In order to regain its manhood – both domestically and internationally – America needed to develop a hyper-masculinized and aggressive breed of foreign policy. Hooper also discusses the idea that since the international sphere is largely composed of men, it may greatly shape both "the production and maintenance of masculinities." War, then, exists in a unique feedback loop whereby it is not only perpetuated by hegemonic masculinity, but also legitimates masculinity. Post-conflict Cyprus, presents one such example, as Stratis Andreas Efthymiou discusses, Greek Cypriot hegemonic masculinity is constructed into the post-conflict culture. Embodying bravery, determination, the subordination of women and a taste for guns were key aspects for achieving GC masculinity. In addition, proudly serving conscription in a difficult unit and showing attachment to the nationalist ideals were the pinnacle attributes of the post-war male. In turn, hegemonic masculinity shaping and being shaped by nationalism and militarism places Greek Cypriot men who appeal to peace politics, cross the divide or interact with the 'other' at risk of failing the hegemonic model of masculinity. In other words, it is challenging for Greek Cypriot men to find a way to respectfully relate to their self, if they attempt to come closer to Turkish Cypriots, because of the nationalist militarist way that masculinity is shaped in Cyprus. Therefore, masculinity is reproduced and adapted through a co-constitutive relationship with militarism and nationalism.

Hooper discusses how military combat has been fundamental to the very composition of masculinity "symbolically, institutionally", and culturally through body shape. Moreover, Hooper discusses how women are seen as life givers, while men are believed to be life takers. As a result, men can only exist as men if they are willing to charge into war, thereby expressing their "enduring 'natural aggression'." Furthermore, this perception also explains the traditional "exclusion of women from combat", while furthering the myth "that military service is the fullest expression of masculinity." This has troubling implications for the continuation of war, and for the enshrinement of masculine norms. Hooper also ideates about the instillation of militarized masculinity in boys, discussing how military service is a "rite of passage" for young men. As such, "war and the military represent one of the major sites where hegemonic masculinities" are formed and enshrined.

Militarized hegemonic masculinity has also impacted perceptions of citizenship as well as the LGBT community. Conscription is fairly common throughout the world, and has also been utilized in America during key conflicts. The majority of men expect conscription to be the price of adult citizenship, but religious objectors and homosexuals have been largely excluded from this. These restrictions have led to the perceived subordinate status of these groups, and their subsequent exclusion from full citizenship, in the same fashion that women have been excluded. This is reflective of the notion that men unable to, or unwilling to fight for their country are more effeminate, as they are breaking with hegemonic norms. The perceptions that homosexuals are unfit for service, and that women have a responsibility at home, is reflective of the heteronormative nature of the military. The institutional composition of the military, itself, reinforces this hegemony through the armed branch's subordination to a "dominating and organizationally competent" branch. Essentially, there is an armed wing, which is masculinized through conflict, and there is a dominating branch, that is masculinized through power. The hierarchical nature of the military is used to enforce, replicate, and enhance hegemonic masculinity.

Male rape is especially prevalent in male dominant environments, such as in the military and prison. In a 2014 GQ article titled "'Son, Men Don't Get Raped'", nearly 30 sexual assault survivors come forward to discuss rape in the military. According to The Pentagon, 38 military men are sexually assaulted every day. The majority of the victims' stories involve a highly ranked perpetrator, such as senior aides, recruiters, or sergeants, which are positions that young soldiers look up to. Some victims describe being weaker than the attacker and physically unable to stop the rape, while others felt too mentally dominated to speak up. Either way, the men were met with defeat and emasculation. In the article, the psychologist James Asbrand, who specializes in post-traumatic stress disorder, explains: "The rape of a male soldier has a particular symbolism. 'In a hyper masculine culture, what's the worst thing you can do to another man?' Force him into what the culture perceives as a feminine role. Completely dominate and rape him." Asbrand refers to the military as a hypermasculine environment, which is consistent with its media portrayal. Joining the army is considered a noble act for men, which military movies, advertisements, and video games reinforce. Because of this, it is no surprise that recruits would likely embody stereotypical masculine personas, and therefore contribute to an environment of competition.

== Toxic masculinity ==
Connell argues that an important feature of hegemonic masculinity is the use of "toxic" practices such as physical violence, which may serve to reinforce men's dominance over women in Western societies. Other scholars have used the term toxic masculinity to refer to stereotypically masculine gender roles that restrict the kinds of emotions that can be expressed (see affect display) by boys and men, including social expectations that men seek to be dominant (the "alpha male").

According to Terry Kupers, toxic masculinity serves to outline aspects of hegemonic masculinity that are socially destructive, "such as misogyny, homophobia, greed, and violent domination". These traits are contrasted with more positive aspects of hegemonic masculinity such as "pride in [one's] ability to win at sports, to maintain solidarity with a friend, to succeed at work, or to provide for [one's] family".

== Hybrid masculinity ==
Hybrid masculinity is the use of aspects of marginalized gender expressions in the gender performance or identity of privileged men. Scholarship on hybrid masculinities suggests that they simultaneously distance themselves from traditional norms of masculinity while reproducing and reinforcing hegemonic masculinity. Hybrid masculinities allow men to negotiate masculinity in ways that mirror more inclusive behavior and attitudes, but leave larger institutional systems sustaining gender inequality undisturbed. Scholars note that "although 'softer' and more 'sensitive' styles of masculinity are developing among some privileged groups of men, this does not necessarily contribute to the emancipation of women; in fact, quite the contrary may be true." The term was introduced to describe the contemporary trend of men taking on politics and perspectives historically understood as "emasculating."

Hybrid masculinity has been studied in relation to the manosphere, particularly beta males and incels as well as in research on gay male culture, teen behavioral issues, and contraception.

== See also ==
- Androcentrism
- Honorary male
- Incel
- Feminism
- Gender apartheid
- Heteropatriarchy
- Homohysteria
- Male as norm
- Male gaze
- Male privilege
- Male supremacy
- Phallocentrism
- Pink capitalism
- Social criticism
- Supremacism
