= Fathering =

Fathering may refer to:

- the male act of begetting a child
- the practice of fatherhood and nurture of a child
- Fathering (journal), an academic publication

== See also ==
- Father (disambiguation)
