= The Journal of Men's Studies =

- Discipline: Men's studies
- Language: English
- Edited by: James Doyle

Publication details
- History: 1992-present
- Publisher: SAGE Publications for the American Men's Studies Association (United States)
- Frequency: Triannually

Standard abbreviations
- ISO 4: J. Men's Stud.

Indexing
- ISSN: 1060-8265 (print); 1933-0251 (web)
- OCLC no.: 181819738

Links
- Journal homepage; Online access; Online archive

The Journal of Men's Studies (abbreviated JMS) is a peer-reviewed journal established in 1992 as the first published by Men's Studies Press. As of 2015 the journal is published by SAGE Publications.

== See also ==
- Gender studies
- Men's studies
- Women's studies
