= Ruling Class, Ruling Culture: Studies of Conflict, Power and Hegemony in Australian Life =

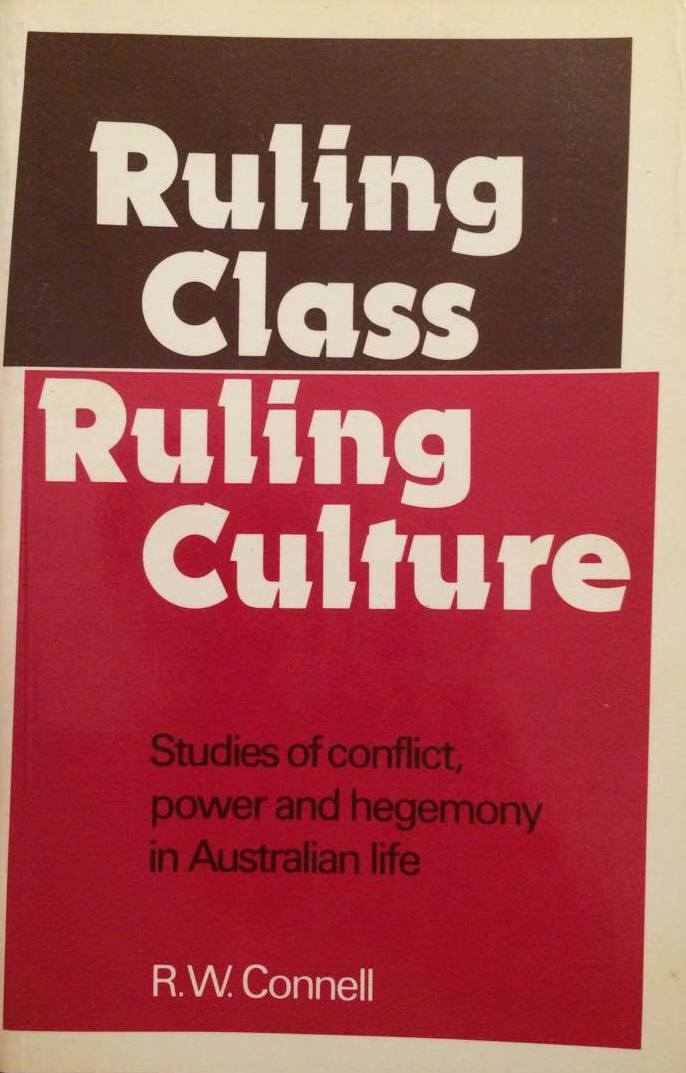
- First edition cover
- Author: Raewyn Connell
- Language: English
- Subject: Sociology
- Genre: Non-fiction
- Published: 1977
- Publisher: Cambridge University Press
- Publication place: Australia
- Pages: 264

Ruling Class Ruling Culture is an influential sociological analysis of class in the 1970s by Australian academic, Raewyn Connell. It covers an extensive range of topics from class conflict, ideological formation, popular culture and the Whitlam dismissal. It was an important text in the development of the Australian New Left, and would substantially inform Connell's collaborative work Class Structure in Australian History.
