= Catherine Driscoll =

Australian professor of Gender and Cultural Studies

Catherine Driscoll is an Australian researcher and expert in gender issues and cultural analysis. She is a professor of Gender and Cultural Studies at the University of Sydney. She has worked at the University of Melbourne, the University of Adelaide, and joined the School of Philosophical and Historical Inquiry at the University of Sydney in 2003. She has held visiting fellow positions at Duke University, Columbia University, Cardiff University, and the Australian National University.

Driscoll served as vice-chair and then chair of the international Association for Cultural Studies (2016-2022).

== Early life and education ==
Driscoll grew up in Wauchope, New South Wales and was educated at Wauchope High School. She subsequently earned degrees from the University of Newcastle (Australia), and the University of Melbourne.

== Research ==
Driscoll's most influential work focuses on ideas about girls and their experiences and identities. This work helped define the field of girls studies, particularly through the influence of her book Girls (2002), which "analyses a vast range of sites, texts, case studies, and discourses from the nineteenth century to the end of the twentieth century" while addressing "debates about post-feminism, girl culture, and feminist generations". Scholarship in girls studies has expanded considerably since Driscoll's work leading up to Girls, but at the time this book was described by Angela McRobbie as "the first sustained account of how young women come to understand themselves through the world of images, texts and representations". It "sought to correct the "invisibility of girls in cultural studies as the discourse most likely to consider their involvement in the production of the world that defines them", offering "a history of 'feminine adolescence' as the category through which we understand girls today, and by extension, through which girls understand themselves and their lives".

As well as many essays on girlhood and girls' media culture, and related work on rural girls, Driscoll teaches and researches more broadly in cultural theory, cultural studies, and youth studies, with specific attention to popular culture, modernist studies, rural studies, and cultural policy. Her work is also interesting for its innovative interdisciplinary method and a "relational" or "conjunctural" approach that Margaret Henderson compares to Michel Foucault's The Order of Things and Ben Highmore compares to Walter Benjamin's The Arcades Project. Driscoll herself stresses a debt to Foucault and Benjamin but also to feminist scholars like Angela McRobbie and to cultural studies scholars like Raymond Williams and Meaghan Morris. This interdisciplinary relational model for feminist cultural studies stretches across Driscoll's books on seemingly very different topics. Highmore argues that in her work on modernism and modernity, "the cultural becomes the way of getting a line on the conjunctural" and modernism is understood as "a deep condition of gendering affect" in analysis that "is profoundly, productively and constitutionally feminist in orientation". Regarding Driscoll's work on rural girlhood, Katherine Murphy notes that she "is able to put historians into conversation with cultural studies, girls studies, and rural studies scholars. Bringing these discussions together with her own ethnographic research, Driscoll demonstrates the ongoing resonance of powerful cultural (and gendered) ideas about the rural and the urban". Even Driscoll's less theoretical work, such as the book Teen Film (2011), features the kind of unexpected directions, for example into media regulation, that Highmore calls her "conjunctural and contextual enquiry".

Her nationally and internationally funded research includes projects on ideas and images of girlhood, the history and experience of Australian country girlhood, cultural sustainability in rural communities, age-based media classification systems, and ideas about boys and boyhood, especially in Australia. She is currently leading a Sydney-based team of feminist researchers on boys studies, arguing for "an understanding of boys and boyhoods as objects in themselves for feminist analysis".

== Books ==
- Girls: Feminine Adolescence in Popular Culture and Cultural Theory, New York: Columbia University Press, 2002.
- Modernist Cultural Studies. Gainesville: University Press of Florida, 2010.
- Teen Film: A Critical Introduction. Oxford: Berg, 2011.
- The Australian Country Girl: History, Image, Experience. Farnham: Ashgate, 2014. Reprinted Routledge, 2018.
- With Alexandra Heatwole, The Hunger Games: Spectacle, Risk and the Girl Action Hero. Oxon: Routledge, 2018.

=== Edited collections ===
- Gender, Media and Modernity in the Asia Pacific, edited Catherine Driscoll and Meaghan Morris. Oxon: Routledge, 2014.
- Cultural Pedagogies and Human Conduct, edited Megan Watkins, Greg Noble and Catherine Driscoll. Oxon: Routledge, 2015.
- Cultural Sustainability in Rural Communities: Rethinking Australian Country Towns, edited Catherine Driscoll, Kate Darian-Smith and David Nichols. Oxon: Routledge, 2017.
- Youth, Technology, Governance, Experience: Adults Understanding Young Lives, edited Liam Grealy, Catherine Driscoll and Anna Hickey-Moody. Oxon: Routledge, 2018.
- Feminist Imaginaries for Boys and Boyhoods, edited Catherine Driscoll, Liam Grealy, Timothy Nicholas Laurie and Shawna Tang. Australian Feminist Studies, 39(119-120), 2024.
