= Lyse Doucet =

Canadian journalist and TV presenter (born 1958)

Lyse Doucet CM OBE
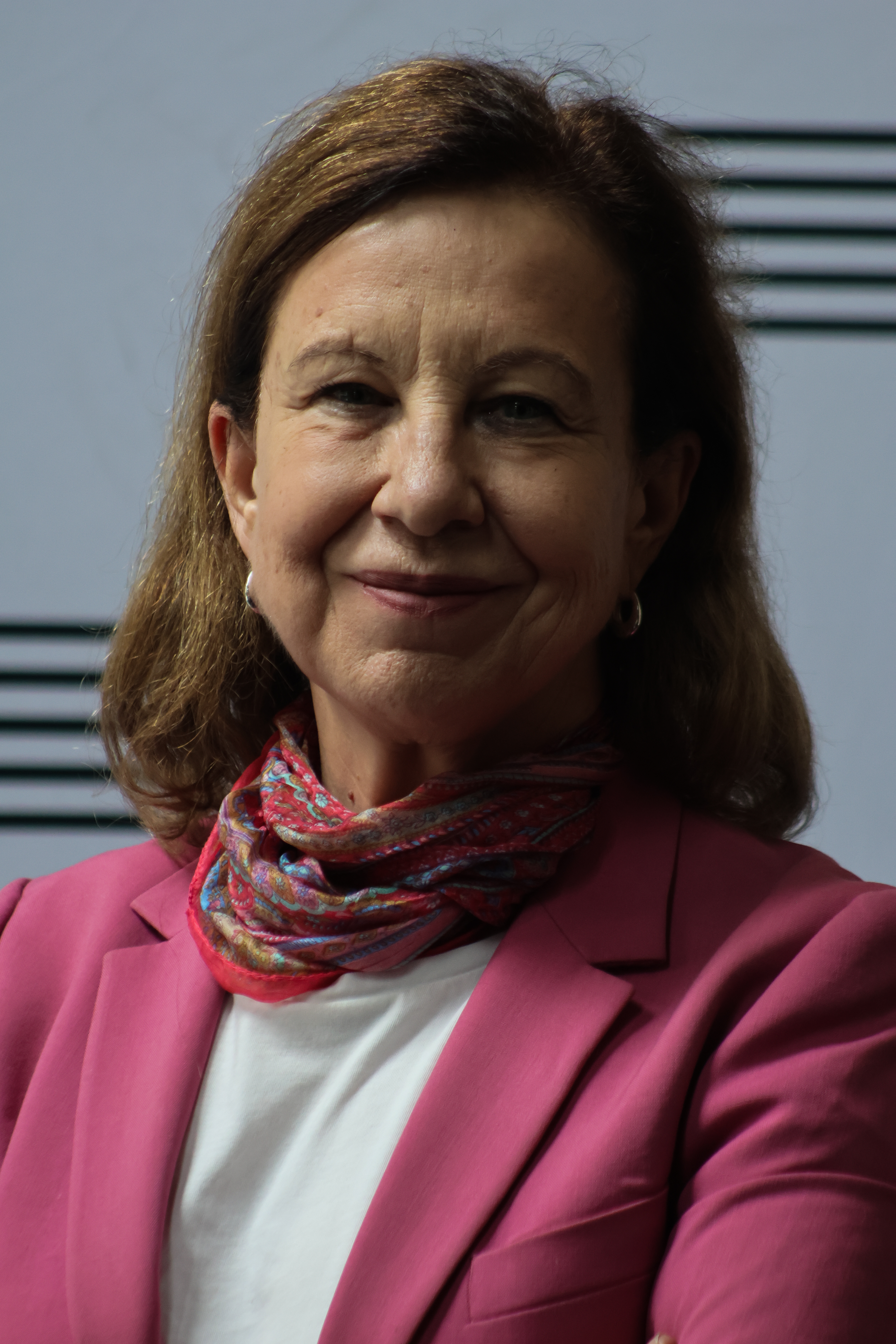
- Doucet at Edinburgh Book Fest 2026
- Born: 24 December 1958 (age 67); Bathurst, New Brunswick, Canada
- Education: University of Toronto; Queen's University at Kingston
- Occupations: Journalist, television presenter
- Employer: BBC
- Notable credits: Newshour; Impact
- Relatives: Andrea Doucet (sister)
- Awards: Women's Prize for Non-Fiction (2026)
- Lyse Doucet's voice from the BBC programme From Our Own Correspondent, 8 June 2013.

Lyse Marie Doucet (/liːz duˈsɛt/; born 24 December 1958) is a Canadian journalist who is the Chief International Correspondent and senior presenter for the BBC. She presents on BBC World Service radio and BBC World News television, and reports for BBC Radio 4 and BBC News in the United Kingdom, including Newshour and Newscast. She also makes and presents documentaries.

== Early life and education ==
Doucet was born on 24 December 1958 in Bathurst, New Brunswick, Canada, where she grew up in an Anglophone Roman Catholic family. Her father was Clarence "Boo" Emile Doucet, and her mother Norma. She is one of six children, three boys and three girls. Her sister is Andrea Doucet, a Canadian professor of sociology. She has Acadian and Irish ancestry. In her youth, Doucet enjoyed curling; she was the lead on the New Brunswick curling team at the 1975 Canada Winter Games, while she attended Bathurst High School.

In 1980, she gained a BA from Queen's University at Kingston, Ontario, where she wrote for the university newspaper. In 1982, she obtained an MA in international relations from the University of Toronto. The same year, she undertook a four-month volunteer assignment teaching English with Canadian Crossroads International in the Ivory Coast. She is currently one of the organisation's honorary patrons.

== Career ==
From 1983 to 1988, she worked as a freelancer in West Africa for the Canadian media and for the BBC. This period proved a stepping stone to a longer-term career with the BBC. Doucet reported from Pakistan in 1988, and was based in Kabul from late 1988 to the end of 1989 to cover the Soviet troop withdrawal and its aftermath. She was the BBC correspondent in Islamabad from 1989 to 1993, also reporting from Afghanistan and Iran. In 1994, she opened the BBC office in Amman, Jordan. From 1995 to 1999, she was based in Jerusalem, travelling across the Middle East. In 1999, she joined the BBC's team of presenters but continues to report from the field.

Doucet played a leading role in the BBC's coverage of the Arab Spring, reporting from Tunisia, Egypt and Libya. She has covered all major wars in the Middle East since the mid-1990s. Doucet has been a frequent visitor to Pakistan and Afghanistan since the late 1980s. Her work includes the aftermath of major natural disasters, including the Indian Ocean tsunami in 2004, which took her to India and Indonesia.

In 2014, she made the documentary Children of Syria with film-maker Robin Barnwell, which was nominated in the Best Single Documentary category at the 2015 BAFTA Awards.

In 2015, she made the documentary Children of the Gaza War with film-maker James Jones.

In 2018, she presented two documentaries titled Syria: The World's War for BBC Two and BBC World.

Beginning on New Year's Day 2018, Doucet presented Her Story Made History, a five-part series on BBC Radio 4 featuring in-depth interviews with five remarkable women. The theme is the relationship between women and democracy. A second series was broadcast in the summer of 2019 on BBC Radio 4 and the BBC World Service.

Doucet reported extensively from Kabul Airport during August 2021, following the coalition withdrawal from Afghanistan after the Taliban offensive in the country.

In the second half of 2021, she recorded a 10-episode podcast for BBC Sounds entitled A Wish for Afghanistan.

In February 2022, alongside Clive Myrie, she contributed to the BBC's coverage of the Russian invasion of Ukraine, from Kyiv.

Doucet's debut book, The Finest Hotel in Kabul: A People's History of Afghanistan (Hutchinson Heinemann), was longlisted for the 2025 Baillie Gifford Prize. The book was described in The Sunday Times Justin Marozzi as "a love letter to Afghanistan and its people" and in The Financial Times by Charles Clover as "a meditation on memory, resilience and the strange intimacy of public spaces". It was also longlisted for the 2026 Women's Prize for Non-Fiction, and went on to be chosen as the winner.

Doucet is currently the BBC's Chief International Correspondent, meaning that she is the most senior BBC correspondent, acting as the lead reporter on world events for the corporation.

== Other activities ==
Doucet is a former Council Member of the Royal Institute of International Affairs (Chatham House). She is a founding member of the Marie Colvin Journalists' Network along with Lindsey Hilsum and Lady Jane Wellesley, a trustee of the Frontline Club for journalists, and a member of the Canadian Journalism Forum on Trauma and Violence. She is also involved with Friends of Aschiana UK, which supports working street children in Afghanistan, and is an honorary patron of Canadian Crossroads International. Doucet takes pride in her ancestry and attends the Acadian World Congress, which is held every five years. She said: "It would be hypocritical to spend all my time learning about other tribes if I were to neglect my own."

She featured on BBC Radio 4's Desert Island Discs on 30 January 2022. Her choices included "Habibi Nour Al Ain" by Amr Diab, "Passionate Kisses" by Mary Chapin Carpenter, "Annie's Song" by John Denver and "L Einaudi: Elegy For The Arctic" by Ludovico Einaudi.

She was Michael Berkeley's guest on BBC Radio 3's Private Passions on 13 September 2026 when her choices included Toumani Diabaté playing the kora, and Edward Elgar's Nimrod, performed by the West-Eastern Divan Orchestra conducted by Daniel Barenboim.

== Awards and recognition ==
In 2002, she was the only journalist to accompany Afghan President Hamid Karzai to his brother's wedding, where an assassination attempt was made. Doucet last interviewed Ahmed Wali Karzai in April 2011, shortly before his assassination.

In 2003, she was awarded a Silver Sony Award for News Broadcaster of the Year for her interview with Yasser Arafat in his compound in Ramallah.

In 2007, she was named International Television Personality of the Year by the Association for International Broadcasting. She also received the News and Factual award from the organisation Women in Film and Television.

Doucet won a Peabody and a David Bloom award in 2010 for her film on maternal mortality in Afghanistan, along with producer Melanie Marshall, Shoaib Sharifi and cameraman Tony Jolliffe. She won Best News Journalist at the 2010 Sony Radio Academy Awards.

In 2012, her team was awarded an Edward Murrow award for radio reports from Tunisia.

In 2014, her team was part of the BBC's Emmy award for its coverage of the Syrian conflict. Doucet was also awarded the ITV Studios Achievement of the Year Award at the annual Women in Film and Television Awards in London.

In 2015, Doucet won the Sandford St Martin trustees’ award "for her commitment to journalism and her intelligent and clear reporting of the religious elements of global events". She also received a Bayeux-Calvados Award for war correspondents. She also won One World Media's Radio Award for a documentary on Afghan women.

In 2016, she was awarded the Columbia School of Journalism Award for exceptional journalist achievement.

At the 2017 International Media Awards, Doucet was awarded the Outstanding Contribution to Broadcasting Award. The award is given to journalists whose body of work has led to better understanding, and as a consequence increased prospects for peace. She also received the Charles Wheeler Award for Outstanding Contribution to Broadcast Journalism by the British Journalism Review.

In 2017, her team won the Luchetta Prize, awarded for work which raises the awareness of the plight of children in war, for its story on a Syrian teenager in the Syrian city of Homs.

In 2018, she was awarded "The Trailblazer Award" from Georgetown University's Institute for Women, Peace and Security. She also received the #ChangeTheCulture award from Their World, a global children's charity based in London UK.

Doucet has an honorary doctorate in Civil Law from the University of King's College in Halifax, Nova Scotia; an honorary Doctor of Letters degree from the University of New Brunswick (2006); an honorary Doctor of Laws degree from University College at the University of Toronto (2009); an honorary doctorate in journalism from Université de Moncton; and an honorary doctorate from Queen's University in Kingston.

In Britain, Doucet has received honorary doctorates from the University of York (2011), the University of St Andrews (2014), Liverpool Hope University Doctor of Humane Letters Honoris causa (cf. Liverpool Hope University Honorary Degree List on Website)(2015), York St John University (2015), the University of Bedfordshire (2017), the University of Sussex (2018), Queen's University Belfast (2019), Cranfield University (2019), the University of Exeter (2022) and the University of Oxford (2023).

She was appointed an Officer of the Order of the British Empire (OBE) in the 2014 Birthday Honours for services to British broadcast journalism. She was appointed as a member of the Order of Canada in December 2018. She was nominated for another Peabody Award in 2021, for her work as a writer and reporter on Afghanistan: Documenting A Crucial Year.

In March 2023, Doucet was awarded the Mungo Park Medal by the Royal Scottish Geographical Society at a ceremony in Perth, Scotland.

In January 2024, she was awarded an honorary degree from Keele University, for her "distinguished and extensive achievements in journalism."

In 2026 she won the Kobo Emerging Writer Prize for nonfiction, for her book The Finest Hotel in Kabul: A People's History of Afghanistan.

== Personal life ==
Doucet lives in the Little Venice neighbourhood in west London.

Media offices
Preceded by ?	Chief International Correspondent: BBC News ?–?	Incumbent
