= Men's studies in the Caribbean =

Men's studies in the Caribbean is an emerging interdisciplinary field that has its roots in family studies programs of the 1950s and 60s, and in feminine studies programs of the 1970s and 80s. In the Caribbean, gender studies have concentrated primarily on "retrieving Caribbean women from historical 'invisibility'", but men's studies is also becoming increasingly popular.

== History ==
In 1991 Barry Chevannes formed Fathers Incorporated, a group catering largely to working-class Jamaican men. The group aimed to counter negative stereotypes of men in the region and to install a sense of responsibility in men towards their children and society. Since 1997, Fathers Incorporated has presented an annual "Model Father" award to recognize fathers who "love, nurture, and provide for their families."

The Centre for Gender and Development Studies, established by the University of the West Indies (UWI) in 1993, contributes to the scholarship on Caribbean masculinity. Courses on men's studies have been introduced on all three campuses of the university. Scholarship on Caribbean masculinity began with a focus on male marginalization within both the education system and the family.

== Male marginalization within the family ==
The Caribbean family has been the subject of continuing scholarly attention since the 1930s, likely due to the seemingly matrifocal family structure. On average, the woman-headed family would earn less than a male-headed family. Marietta Morrissey noted that male migration was often a factor in these women-headed families and that it was not unusual for men to be absent for years. These men would send back money whenever possible to support their families. Although men did not always reside with their families, they did maintain influence, causing Morrissey to comment that, “male authority embodied in the patriarchal family is often an ideal in so-called matrifocal societies.” Caribbean societies are not strictly matrifocal because families move in and out of matrifocality. They try to establish nuclear families, sometimes successfully, but may return to a matrifocal structure if the attempt ends in failure. Age can be a factor in whether or not a nuclear family structure is established because older men are often in better positions to support women and children.

Despite claims of objectivity from anthropologists in the 1950s, early Caribbean anthropology showed marked ethnocentrism in labeling non-nuclear family structures "incomplete". It also failed to recognize visiting unions, regardless of the duration of a couple’s relationship or the presence of children in the union.

According to the male marginalization theory, men are peripheral to the family. The familial roles of men are perceived as being limited to providing economic support and occasional discipline, yet men are commonly seen to be inadequate even in these limited roles. Although the stereotype of the breadwinner is particularly prevalent in Caribbean masculinity, little employment is available to men and they must migrate elsewhere to provide for their families. Christine Barrow challenges the idea of male marginalization in the family and suggested that Caribbean men show strong bonds to their mothers. Males commonly lived with, and assumed responsibility for, their mothers well into adulthood, a task they saw as natural reciprocity. In addition, they often took responsibility for their siblings, and more rarely for their nieces and nephews.

== Male academic underachievement ==
Mark Figueroa wrote that the "decline of male, relative to female, academic performance in the Caribbean… has captured the attention of professionals." At the common entrance examination, the first level of testing, Jamaican females achieve a higher number of places than males. This includes discriminatory practices employed in some Caribbean territories, which favor male students to redress the balance. The imbalance in academic performance continues at the university level. By the end of 1992, 70% of graduates from the Mona campus of the University of the West Indies were female, and Odette Parry's sample of Jamaican schools revealed that there is less than one male teacher for every four female ones.

Although the theory of male marginalization, introduced by Miller, is popularly held, it has been suggested that male academic underperformance is rooted in male privileging and gender socialization. At home, boys are “expected to misbehave while girls are expected to conform to a rigid code. If a boy misbehaves it is essentially expected, but if a girl does so it is a serious matter.” Research has also indicated that male academic under-performance is misleading and that it is actually a matter of differential gender performance. Within Caribbean academia, traditional patterns of study exist. Boys have identified English and reading as "too girlish" for males, and Parry's study indicated that even female teachers perceived English and grammar as being women's subjects. Female dominance can be explained in certificate programs because "their male counterparts do not need further qualifications to get ahead."

Jamaica's recent statistics on education have indicated that females now outperform males at all levels and in a wide range of disciplines, including some formerly dominated by males. Women have been the majority among Jamaican students since 1974-75 across all three campuses of UWI. In 1974 women made up nearly 80% of students in the arts and education disciplines but less than 40% of students in law, medicine, and natural sciences.

Research has also indicated an anti-academic male sex/gender identity. Parry wrote that “according to teachers, males are sexually rejected by their female peers”.
