= Daphne C. Watkins =

Daphne C. Watkins, is an author, researcher, executive coach, and professor who studies behavioral health interventions for historically marginalized groups, mixed methods approaches to research in context, and leadership development/organizational management.

Watkins’ research has focused on understanding the social determinants of health that explain within-group differences among Black men, developing evidence-based strategies to improve the physical and mental health conditions for Black men; and increasing knowledge about the intersection of age, culture, and gender. Watkins is an experienced mixed methods researcher who uses qualitative and quantitative data to increase knowledge about how intersecting social determinants and gender dynamics place marginalized men at high risk for poor health.

== Education ==
Watkins received a bachelor's degree in anthropology (minor in French) from the University of North Carolina at Wilmington in 2002, and earned her Ph.D. in Health Education from Texas A&M University in 2006. She earned an Executive MBA from the Quantic School of Business and Technology and is a Board Certified Coach (BCC). She completed two postdoctoral fellowships before beginning her tenure-track faculty position, a National Institutes of Mental Health (NIMH) T32 fellowship at the Institute for Social Research at the University of Michigan, and a National Institutes of Health (NIH) K12 Institutional Career Award at Michigan Medicine's Department of Obstetrics and Gynecology.

== Academic career ==
Watkins is a University Diversity and Social Transformation Professor and the Letha A. Chadiha Collegiate Professor of Social Work at the University of Michigan. She is the inaugural director of the Master of Arts in Social Impact Leadership (MSIL) program at the University of Michigan School of Social Work. She is a former Director of the Vivian A. and James L. Curtis Center for Health Equity Research and Training. Since its establishment in 2008, the Curtis Center has been a catalyst for social change in underserved communities, all the while shaping the careers of budding scholars dedicated to ameliorating health and social disparities.

Watkins is the Founding Director of the Gender and Health Research Lab and the Certificate Program in Mixed Methods Research at the University of Michigan. She is also the Founding Director of the award-winning Young Black Men, Masculinities, and Mental Health (YBMen) Project, a mental health education and social support initiative for young Black men. From 2013 to 2017, Watkins served as the first woman and African-American president of American Men's Studies Association (AMSA).

As of July 2026, Watkins had an h-index score of 43 on Scopus and has drawn positive attention from outlets and organizations such as The Good Men Project.

== Research ==
Watkins specializes in three interconnected areas of expertise: (1) behavioral interventions for historically underrepresented groups; (2) mixed methods approaches to research in context; and (3) social impact leadership and organizational management. Watkins has been published in numerous outlets, with her research focusing on “understanding the social determinants” of one's health that can explain the differences within groups of black men. She aims to develop strategies and initiatives that improve the physical well-being and mental health of Black men.

Co-authored with Dr. Derek Griffith, Watkins guest editorial was featured in the article Practical Solutions to Addressing Men’s Health Disparities, published in the International Journal of Men’s Health. The editorial discusses the obvious gap in men's health research regarding how differences in health among men are explained. Watkins argues that there is a lack of conversation surrounding the potential solutions that can help prevent or eliminate the differences in health outcomes among certain groups of men and uses diverse research methods to propose versatile solutions. Watkins also published a 2023 volume (co-edited by James A. Smith and Derek Griffith) that highlights novel and pragmatic health promotion efforts being adopted with boys and young men of colour (BYMOC) globally that apply a strengths-based approach.

Published in the International Journal of Qualitative Methods in 2017, her article Rapid and Rigorous Qualitative Data Analysis: The “RADaR” Technique for Applied Research examines a timely qualitative analysis strategy termed the ‘rigorous and accelerated data reduction (RADaR) technique.’ The RADaR technique has been cited over 300 times globally and involves using tables and spreadsheets for data reduction, which can help researchers build more succinct data tables. The RADaR technique specifically converts raw data into a more ‘user-friendly format.’

Her expertise in applying mixed methods approaches to research in context includes using mixed methods with ethnically and historically minoritized communities. In 2015, Watkins published the book, "Mixed Methods Research," with Deborah Gioia for Oxford University Press and in 2022, she published the book, "Secondary Data in Mixed Methods Research" with SAGE Publications.
