= Andrea Doucet =

Canadian social scientist and writer

- Born: 1960 (age 65–66); Bathurst, New Brunswick
- Education: BA in Political Theory, York University; MA in International Development Studies, Carleton University, PhD, University of Cambridge
- Occupations: Canada Research Chair in Gender, Work and Care
- Employer(s): Carleton University, Brock University
- Website: www.andreadoucet.com

Andrea Doucet (born c.1960) is a Canadian social scientist and writer. She is professor of sociology and gender studies at Brock University, and holds the Canada Research Chair in gender, work and care. She was also the editor of the academic journal Fathering.

== Early life ==
Doucet was born in Bathurst, New Brunswick, Canada in 1960, where she grew up in an Anglophone family. Her sister is BBC chief correspondent Lyse Doucet OBE.

== Education ==
Doucet completed her BA in political theory at York University in Toronto and her MA in international development studies at Carleton University. She earned her PhD in social and political sciences in 1995 from Cambridge University.

== Career ==
In 1995 and 1996 Doucet was a post doctoral fellow and lecturer at Cambridge. From 1995 to 1998 she was an assistant professor of sociology at St. Mary's University in Halifax, Nova Scotia. At Carleton University, she was professor of sociology from 1998 to 2011.

She has been professor of sociology and gender studies at Brock University since 2011. She has also held the Canada Research Chair in gender, work and care since 2011. Doucet is recognized as an "expert in caregiving and work-life balance".

She was an editor of the now defunct academic journal, Fathering: a Journal of Theory, Research, and Practice about Men as Fathers.

In 2009, as sociology professor at Carleton University in Ottawa, Ontario, Doucet undertook a study entitled "Bread and Roses Project" in which she tracked couples in which women were the primary earners using data from both Canada and the United States. In a 2010 interview with The New York Times, Doucet observed that, "With women taking on more earning and men taking on more caring, there's a lot of shifting and juggling. You can't just reverse the genders." In an interview with the New York Post Doucet explained that "The ambiguity over who does what, and its accompanying stress, is to be expected as gender roles change."The 'mancession' has been difficult on couples. Many have told me that they did not expect to be in this situation. To suddenly have it sprung upon you because of job loss can lead to a rapid and stress-filled learning curve for both men and women." In her project Bread and Roses — And the Kitchen Sink, Doucet said, "It's been just a steady progression of women's education going up and employment going up, but then quite a remarkable leap in women being primary breadwinners or shared primary breadwinners relates to the changes in the economy."

=== Research ===
From 1998 to 2002 she was the principal investigator of "Fathers as Primary Caregivers" which received a Canada Social Sciences and Humanities Research Council (SSHRC), the Canadian federal research funding agency.

== Selected publications ==
- Doucet, Andrea (2006). Do men mother? fathering, care, and domestic responsibility. Toronto, Ontario: University of Toronto Press. ISBN 9780802085467.
- Doucet, Andrea; Siltanen, Janet (2008). Gender relations in Canada: intersectionality and beyond. Don Mills, Ontario: Oxford University Press. ISBN 9780195423204.
- Doucet, Andrea (2010), "Taking off the maternal lens: engaging with Sara Ruddick on men and mothering", in O'Reilly, Andrea (ed.), Twenty-first-century motherhood experience, identity, policy, agency, New York: Columbia University Press, pp. 170–180, ISBN 9780231520478. Preview.
- Doucet, Andrea; McKay, Lindsey; Tremblay, Diane-Gabrielle (2011), "Canada and Quebec: two policies, one country", in Moss, Peter; Kamerman, Sheila B. (eds.), The politics of parental leave policies: children, parenting, gender and the labour market, Bristol: Policy, pp. 33–50, ISBN 9781847429032.

== Awards ==
- 2007: John Porter Tradition of Excellence Book Award from the Canadian Sociological Association
