= International Journal of Men's Health =

- Discipline: Men's studies
- Language: English

Publication details
- History: 2002-2016
- Publisher: Men's Studies Press
- Frequency: Triannually
- Open access: Delayed, after 12 months

Standard abbreviations
- ISO 4: Int. J. Men's Health

Indexing
- ISSN: 1532-6306

Links
- Journal homepage

The International Journal of Men's Health was a triannual peer-reviewed academic journal which was published by Men's Studies Press from 2002 until 2016. It covered all aspects of men's health. The editor-in-chief was Steve Robertson (Leeds Metropolitan University). The journal was abstracted and indexed in Scopus.
