= Harry Brod =

American sociologist (1951–2017)

- Born: February 1, 1951
- Died: June 16, 2017 (aged 66)

Academic background
- Education: University of California, San Diego
- Thesis: Hegel's philosophy of politics (1981)

Academic work
- Institutions: University of Northern Iowa
- Main interests: Men's studies, men's movement
- Website: http://www.harrybrod.com

Harry Brod (February 1, 1951 – June 16, 2017) was a professor of sociology at University of Northern Iowa.

== Education ==
He held a PhD in Philosophy, 1981, from the University of California, San Diego.

== Men's studies ==
Brod was one of the first academics to specialize in men's studies. Brod became interested in the men's movement in the mid-1960s, as he thought about society's expectations of individuals based on their gender.

About 1980, while working on his doctorate at the University of California, San Diego, Brod attended a weekend retreat called the California Men's Gathering. While eating breakfast, he witnessed an argument between two men. One man complained that the discussions were not sufficiently focused on women's issues. The other man said the retreat was about men's emotional and personal needs, and that men should not feel guilty about their power and position in society. After listening to the arguments, Brod decided to devote much of his life to "showing people that damage to men's psyches is the result of the power we have over everyone else."

== Kenyon College ==
Brod was hired as interim director of the new Women’s and Gender Studies Department at Kenyon College in the early 1990s. Despite being assured during the hiring process that his gender was not an issue, the appointment of a man was very controversial.

As a man of the left, I’ve been attacked from the right. Here, also, I’ve been attacked from the left, as a male. Completely isolated, no structure, no connection. Under fire. Incredible.

== Publications ==
=== Author ===
- Brod, Harry (1992). Hegel's philosophy of politics: idealism, identity, and modernity. Boulder, Colo.: Westview Press. ISBN 978-0-8133-8317-0.
- Brod, Harry (2012). Superman is Jewish? : how comic book superheroes came to serve truth, justice, and the Jewish-American way. New York: Free Press. ISBN 978-1-4165-9530-4.

=== Editor ===
- Brod, Harry, ed. (2014). The making of masculinities: the new men's studies. London: Routledge. ISBN 978-1-138-82829-2.
- Brod, Harry, ed. (1988). A Mensch among men: explorations in Jewish masculinity. Freedom, Calif.: Crossing Press. ISBN 978-0-89594-265-4.
- Brod, Harry; Kaufman, Michael, eds. (1994). Theorizing masculinities. Thousand Oaks, Calif.: Sage Publications. ISBN 978-0-8039-4904-1.
- Brod, Harry; Zevit, Shawn, eds. (2010). Brother keepers: new perspectives on Jewish masculinity. Harriman, Tenn.: Men's Studies Press. ISBN 978-1-931342-27-8.

=== Book chapters ===
- Brod, Harry (2015) [first published 1990]. "Pornography and the alienation of male sexuality". In Morgan, David H. J.; Hearn, Jeff (eds.). Men, masculinities & social theory. Routledge Library Editions: Social Theory. London: Routledge. pp. 124–140. ISBN 978-1-317-64781-2.
  Reprinted in: May, Larry; Strikwerda, Robert; Hopkins, Patrick D., eds. (1996). Rethinking masculinity: philosophical explorations in light of feminism (2nd ed.). Lanham, Md.: Rowman & Littlefield. pp. 237–254. ISBN 978-0-8476-8257-7.
- Brod, Harry (2008). "Circumcisional Circumstances: Circumspecting the Jewish Male Body". In Dorff, Elliot N.; Newman, Louis E. (eds.). Jewish Choices, Jewish Voices: Body. Philadelphia: The Jewish Publication Society. pp. 52–58. ISBN 978-0-8276-0860-3.
