= Raewyn Connell =

Australian professor (born 1944)

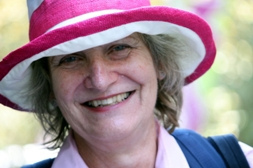
- Born: 3 January 1944 (age 82); Sydney, Australia
- Education: University of Melbourne (B.A.); University of Sydney (Ph.D.)
- Occupation: Sociologist
- Known for: Research on hegemonic masculinity, men's studies, Southern theory
- Relatives: Patricia Margaret Selkirk (sister)
- Awards: Jessie Bernard Award
- Website: raewynconnell.net

Raewyn Connell (born 3 January 1944), usually cited as R. W. Connell, is an Australian feminist sociologist and professor emeritus at the University of Sydney, known for co-founding the field of masculinity studies and coining the concept of hegemonic masculinity, as well as for her work on Southern theory.

== Life and career ==
Connell was born in Sydney, Australia. Her father, William Fraser Connell, was a professor of education at the University of Sydney, where he focused on educational research and teaching. Her mother, Margaret Lloyd Connell (née Peck) was a high school science teacher. Connell has two sisters, Patricia Margaret Selkirk and Helen Connell.

Connell was educated at Manly and North Sydney High Schools, and has degrees from the University of Melbourne and University of Sydney. She has held academic positions at universities in Australia, including being the founding professor of sociology at Macquarie University from 1976–1991.

In the United States Connell was visiting professor of Australian studies at Harvard University from 1991–1992, and professor of sociology at University of California Santa Cruz from 1992–1995. She was a rank-and-file member of the Australian Labor Party until the early 1980s and a trade unionist who is a lifetime member of the National Tertiary Education Union. She has been considered a prominent intellectual of the Australian New Left.

She was appointed University Professor at the University of Sydney in 2004, and retired from her University Chair in July 2014. She has been professor emeritus at the University of Sydney since her retirement.

The Australian Sociological Association established the biennal Raewyn Connell Prize in her honour in 2010.

Connell has served on the editorial board or advisory board of numerous academic journals, including Signs, Sexualities, The British Journal of Sociology, Theory and Society, and The International Journal of Inclusive Education.

Connell is a trans woman, who began transitioning late in life. Almost all her earlier work was published under the gender-neutral name "R. W. Connell" up to the second edition of Masculinities in 2005. Since 2006 all her work has appeared under the name Raewyn Connell. Connell has also written about trans women and feminism from an international perspective. Connell identifies as a "hardline feminist" and "dangerous lefty".

== Major scholarly contributions ==
Connell's sociology emphasises the historical nature of social reality and the transformative character of social practice. Her writing combines empirical detail, structural analysis, critique, and relevance to practice. Much of her empirical work uses biographical (life-history) interviewing in education, family life, and workplaces. Her books and articles have been translated into 18 languages.

=== Class and education ===
Connell first became known for research on large-scale class dynamics (Ruling Class, Ruling Culture, 1977, and Class Structure in Australian History, 1980), and the ways class and gender hierarchies are re-made in the everyday life of schools (Making the Difference, 1982).

=== Gender and masculinities ===
In the late 1980s she developed a social theory of gender relations (Gender and Power, 1987), which emphasizes that gender is a large-scale social structure not just a matter of personal identity. In this text, she proposes that the word "gender" be discussed in terms of three structures (power, production/labor, and emotion/sexual relations). In applied fields she has worked on poverty and education, sexuality and AIDS prevention, and labour movement strategy.

Connell is best known outside Australia for studies of the social construction of masculinities. She was one of the founders of this research field, and her book Masculinities (1995, 2005) is the most-cited in the field. Hegemonic masculinity, a theory developed by Connell, has had a significant impact on feminist sociology. In their critique of the sex-role theory, Connell and her co-authors claim that the emphasis on internalized norms, attitudes, and behaviours of society obscures structural inequalities and power dynamics and misrepresents the gendering process. For instance, girls and women are frequently expected to behave politely, be accommodating, and be caring, while men are typically supposed to be powerful, combative, and fearless. Gender role expectations exist in every country, ethnic group, and culture, although they can vary greatly among them. She has been an advisor to United Nations initiatives relating men, boys, and masculinities to gender equality and peacemaking.

Connell and James Messerschmidt collaborated on a piece, "Hegemonic Masculinity: Rethinking the Concept" (2005), in response to scepticism that the outcome of Connell's theory of masculinities creates a fixed typology. In addition to supporting the categorization of her theories, Connell emphasizes the relationship between men and emotions. Connell argues that in today's society, men may be so emotionally disconnected that they are not conscious of their emotional states, such as depression. Many men have learned from their parents, friends, or other peers that they should not show emotion as it can be seen as a weakness. By the time these boys become adults, they have developed the ability to suppress their emotional responses, such as crying or sad facial expressions, to the point where they are really unaware of these emotions and unable to connect with them. One gender cannot be examined in isolation from another and Connell emphasizes the heterogeneous nature of masculinity. In contrast to feminism, masculine politics, according to Connell, cannot be a political movement. Women's marginalized identities frequently undergo positive evaluation on the part of feminists. On the other hand, authors on masculinity are almost always critical of the benefits that come with being a man.

=== Southern theory ===
Connell has developed a sociology of intellectuals that emphasizes the collective character of intellectual labour and the importance of its social context. Her 2007 book Southern Theory extends this to the global dynamics of knowledge production, critiquing the Northern bias of mainstream social science which is predominately produced in metropolitan universities. In doing so, she argues, metropolitan social theory fails to adequately explain social phenomena in the Southern experience. She analyses examples of theoretical work deriving from the global South, including the work of Paulin J. Hountondji, Ali Shariati, Veena Das, Ashis Nandy, and Raúl Prebisch.

Connell has also explored the implications of Southern theory on gender studies in the sociology of gender, neoliberalism, and other global knowledge projects. She argues in these contexts that historical power differentiation is maintained through imperialistic privileging of thought and that decolonizing this construction of knowledge can revolutionize societies across the globe. In an essay in Planning Theory, for example, Connell calls for social science to accept subaltern views that have traditionally been ignored so that modern resources can be maximised in various fields such as urban planning, geography, and youth studies.

==== Criticism ====
In an essay titled "Under Southern Skies", Connell responded to four other scholars of sociology, Mustafa Emirbayer, Patricia Hill Collins, Raka Ray, and Isaac Ariail Reed, who had all written critically about her work on Southern theory. While acknowledging how Connell's work has sparked important discussion, the arguments of these sociologists included Ray claiming that Southern theory marks a tipping point for postcolonial sociology rather than global sociology, Reed finding Connell's theoretical concepts to be underdeveloped, Emirbayer writing that Connell tends to overgeneralize "Northern Theory" while making unfounded claims about "Southern Theory", and Collins identifying the issues of the centring of the North and the silencing of much of the Global South by only examining the theories of Southern educated elite. In her response, Connell responds to certain points from each argument to stand by her work, countering their criticism by explaining the decisions behind her writing and affirming that her work is a jumping-off point for further discussion.

== Honours and awards ==
- The Australian Sociological Association Distinguished Service to Australian Sociology Award (2007)
- The Australian Sociological Association Stephen Crook Memorial Prize, for Southern Theory (2008)
- American Sociological Association Jessie Bernard Award (2017)
- International Sociological Association Award for Excellence in Research and Practice (2021)
- Pompeu Fabra University honorary doctorate (2023)

== Selected books ==
- 1967. Politics of the Extreme Right: Warringah, 1966 (co-written with Florence Gould). Sydney University Press.
- 1977. Ruling Class, Ruling Culture: Studies of Conflict, Power and Hegemony in Australian Life. Cambridge University Press
- 1980. Class Structure in Australian History (co-written with Terry Irving). Longman Cheshire
- 1982. Making the Difference: Schools, Families and Social Division (co-written with Dean Ashenden, Gary Dowsett, and Sandra Kessler). Allen & Unwin
- 1983. Which Way Is Up? Essays on Sex, Class and Culture. Allen & Unwin
- 1987. Gender and Power: Society, the Person and Sexual Politics. Allen & Unwin
- 1995. Masculinities. Allen & Unwin
- 2000. The Men and the Boys. Allen & Unwin
- 2000. Male Roles, Masculinities and Violence: A Culture of Peace Perspective (co-edited with Ingeborg Breines and Ingrid Eide). UNESCO Publishing
- 2007. Southern Theory: The Global Dynamics of Knowledge in Social Science. Polity
- 2009. Gender: In World Perspective. Polity
- 2019. The Good University: What Universities Actually Do and Why It's Time for Radical Change. Zed Books
