= Homohysteria =

Fear of being thought homosexual

Homohysteria is the fear of being thought homosexual because of behavior that is typically considered gender atypical. Homohysteria can exist in cultures where it is understood that people are and can be homosexual, even if closeted, and that homosexuality is perceived as less desirable than heterosexuality. This combination leads to men fearing others will think they are gay if they do not fit male gender stereotypes. Not fitting into gender stereotypes (gender atypicality) has historically been associated with gay men, with the trials of Oscar Wilde furthering this belief in Britain and elsewhere, with his conviction of gross indecency furthering public stereotypes about gay males. Because of these misconceptions, many stereotypically "masculine-acting" gay men were exempt from public suspicion about their sexuality.

== Creation ==
Homohysteria is a concept established as part of Professor Eric Anderson's Inclusive Masculinity Theory. Both Eric Anderson and Mark McCormack argue that there are three social conditions that must be met for a homohysteric culture to exist: (1) widespread awareness that male homosexuality exists as an immutable sexual orientation within a significant portion of a culture's population; (2) high levels of homophobia in that culture; and (3) an association of gender atypicality with homosexuality. These varying levels of social conditions help explain various social trends concerning masculinities.

For example, homohysteria helps explain how men in many Islamic countries are permitted to engage in physical and emotional intimacy (including hand-holding) without threat to their publicly perceived heterosexual identities; whereas two men holding hands in America are perceived as gay, men in Islamic countries are not considered homosexual for partaking in the same behaviours. This is due to a belief that men in these societies could not be gay, with Iranian president Mahmoud Ahmadinejad claiming Iran had no gay people, and others declaring homosexuality to be the "white man's disease".

Likewise, homohysteria has the ability to explain nuances between male tactility over time, with the work of John Ibson found a decrease in social distance between men in group photographs, which can be understood through utilising homohysteria. This concept has been utilised in explaining homophobia and gender policing among females also; primarily by Rachael Bullingham in her exploration of the athletes experiences in team sports.

Western homohysteria is believed by Eric Anderson to have peaked in the 1980s, following the HIV/AIDS epidemic amongst gay men.

== Impact ==
As a culture becomes less homophobic and there is less of a stigma around physical platonic affection between men, the lives of heterosexual men are improved, as they are less aggressive and physically alienated from one another.
