= Men's studies =

Interdisciplinary academic field

Men's studies is an interdisciplinary academic field devoted to topics concerning men, masculinity, gender, culture, politics and sexuality. It academically examines what it means to be a man in contemporary society.

== Origins ==
Sociologists and psychologists in the Nordic countries such as Norwegians Erik Grønseth and Per Olav Tiller were early pioneers of men's studies as a research field; Grønseth and Tiller's classic study of father absence in sailor families and its impact on children's personality development in the 1950s is often regarded as the starting point of men's studies in the Nordic countries.

In Anglophone countries, men's studies was formed, largely in response to an emerging men's rights movement, and as such, has been taught in academic settings only since the 1970s.

In contrast to the discipline of masculine psychology, men's studies programs and courses often include contemporary discussions of men's rights, feminist theory, queer theory, matriarchy, patriarchy, and more generally, what proponents describe as the social, historical, and cultural influences on the constructions of men. They often discuss the issues surrounding male privilege, seen as evolving into more subtle and covert forms rather than disappearing in the modern era.

It is important to distinguish the specific approach often defined as Critical Studies on Men. This approach was largely developed in the anglophone countries from the early 1980s - especially in the United Kingdom - centered then on the work of Jeff Hearn, David Morgan, and colleagues. The influence of the approach has spread globally since then. It is inspired primarily by a range of feminist perspectives (including socialist and radical) and places emphasis on the need for research and practice to challenge men's and boys' sexism explicitly. Although it explores a very broad range of men's practices, it tends to focus especially on issues related to sexuality and/or men's violences. Although originally largely rooted in sociology, it has since engaged with a broad range of other disciplines including social policy, social work, cultural studies, gender studies, education and law. In more recent years, Critical Studies on Men research has made particular use of comparative and/or transnational perspectives. Like Men's Studies and Masculinity Studies more generally, Critical Studies on Men has been critiqued for its failure to adequately focus on the issue of men's relations with children as a key site for the development of men's oppressive masculinity formations - men's relations with women and men's relations with other men being the two sites which are heavily researched by comparison.

== Topics ==
=== Masculinity ===
Early men's studies scholars studied social construction of masculinity, which the Australian sociologist Raewyn Connell is best known for.

Connell introduced the concept of hegemonic masculinity, describing it as a practice that legitimizes men's dominant position in society and justifies the subordination of the common male population and women, and other marginalized ways of being a man. Being pervasive across societies, it results in multiple masculinities, specifically a hierarchy of masculinities, in which some men do not experience the same privilege other men do, because of their other marginalized identities. The concept has attracted several criticisms (see Hegemonic masculinity § Criticisms), which led to Connell (and James Messerschmitt) reformulating areas of hegemonic masculinity. This newer version examines the power and social dynamics within the gender hierarchy; the geography of masculinity at local, regional, and global levels; social embodiment; and the dynamics of masculinity, including the complex interweaving of multiple masculinities. Connell emphasizes that masculinity is constantly evolving, meaning the curriculum and research of this field will always change.

Michael Kimmel, an American sociologist and feminist specializing in gender studies, has written about manhood in America. According to Kimmel, masculinity began to be defined and reaffirmed around 19th-century America. It involved proving one's masculine worth as well as providing for one's family, and thereby also affected the political arena, workplace, family, and society at large. Kimmel posits that the imbibing of masculinity happens to young boys at home, at school, and when watching adults interact. Kimmel described the term 'toxic masculinity' as the male-enacted cultural norms that are harmful to men and society, because they encourage negative behaviors related to dominance, aggression, and sexuality.

Eric Anderson, an American sociologist and sexologist specializing in adolescent men's gender and sexualities, has researched and written about the relationship between hegemonic masculinity and homophobia. According to Anderson's empirical research, he found that decreasing homophobia can lead to more inclusive masculinity because hegemonic masculinity has limited men's behavior in fear of being perceived as gay. Kimmel describes this theory as "Inclusive Masculinity Theory".

=== Cultural expectations ===
It has been argued that the cultural expectations of boys and men to be tough, stoic, aggressive, and unemotional are harmful to men's development because they reduce the range of human emotions being experienced, increase levels of anger and depression, and can even result in a shortened life expectancy.

=== Violence ===
Research on violence has been a major focus of men's studies. Research focuses on men as both perpetrators and victims of violence, as well as on how to involve men and boys in anti-violence work.

=== Sexuality ===
Studying the relation between masculinity and male sexual shame revealed that greater endorsement of traditionally masculine values was associated with increased sexual shame, which in turn is predictive of depression.

=== Health ===
Men's studies scholars have studied aspects of men's health and illness such as premature death and coronary heart disease.

=== Work and care ===
Men's studies is notably concerned with challenging gendered arrangements of work and care, and the male breadwinner role, and policies are increasingly targeting men as fathers, as a tool of changing gender relations.

=== Boys and boyhoods ===
The study of boys and boyhood has emerged from within the sociology of masculinity and focuses on how ideas and expectations about gender shape boys' experiences of childhood. For Laurie et al., "ideas about boys and boyhood have considerable currency in shaping understandings of the causes of gender inequality, and significantly impact any efforts to transform gender-based hierarchies."

== Organizations ==
The American Men's Studies Association (AMSA) traces the roots of an organized field of men's studies to the early 1980s. The work of scholars involved in an anti-sexist organization called the Men's Studies Task Group (MSTG) of the National Organization for Changing Men (NOCM), which included Martin Acker, Shepherd Bliss, Harry Brod, Sam Femiano, Martin Fiebert, and Michael Messner. However, men's studies classes also predate NOCM, and a small number were taught in various colleges across the United States throughout the 1970s. Conferences such as the Men and Masculinity conferences sparked the creation of newsletters and journals, such as the Men's Studies Newsletter (and its successor, Men's Studies Review), on the growing field of men's studies. These became prime resources for those interested in the field, providing news, bibliographies, and firsthand experiences. Following the newsletters and journals came the Men's Studies Press, thereby bringing the academic field of masculinity studies into print.

When NOCM changed its name to the National Organization for Men Against Sexism (NOMAS), the MSTG became the Men's Studies Association (MSA). The MSA was an explicitly pro-feminist group, and those who felt this was too constraining split away several years later to form the American Men's Studies Association (AMSA), although NOMAS would not allow AMSA to become a self-governing entity, leading to ideological clashes between the two groups.

== Journals ==
The men and masculinities field includes at least eight focused journals: Culture, Society, and Masculinities, Journal of Men's Studies, Masculinities and Social Change, Masculinities: A Journal of Identity and Culture, Men and Masculinities, New Male Studies, Norma: International Journal for Masculinity Studies, and Psychology of Men & Masculinity.

== Criticism ==
The field of men's studies has received criticism for its separateness from the rest of gender studies.

Some feminists scholars view men's studies only as "taking away potential limited funding dedicated for women's studies". Timothy Laurie and Anna Hickey-Moody insist that "[any] atomisation of masculinity studies as distinct from gender studies, feminist inquiry or queer studies must be understood as provisional and hazardous rather than as the result of absolute differences in the phenomena being investigated or expertise required". Some feminists also argue that many gender and race studies were created to discuss the oppression that these race/genders experience. Since men do not experience systematic oppression because of their sex, men's studies shouldn't be included within "oppression" studies because it "risks leveling structure of power by granting men's studies an equal and complementary place to women's studies". In 1989 Joyce E. Canaan and Christine Griffin described their suspicions of The New Men's Studies (TNMS), saying "Is it a coincidence that TNMS is being constructed in the present context as a source of potential research, publishing deals, and (even more) jobs for the already-well-paid boys holding prestigious positions?" Researchers in transgender studies, including Jack Halberstam, have also questioned the relationship between male biology and gender identity within masculinity studies.

Men's studies scholars have responded by explaining its importance. Harry Brod, an American sociologist, explains that the importance of men's studies lies in the fact that, before the emergence of the discipline, some feminists had been examining generalizations about genders, whereas this discipline focuses on the "study of masculinities and male experiences as specific and varying social-historical-cultural formations." Connell adds that by having a field for masculinity studies it may help "identify men's interest in change".

== See also ==
- Gender studies
- Masculism
- Men and feminism
- Men's liberation
- Men's movement
- Men's rights
- Women's studies
- Black male studies
- Discrimination against men
