= Class Structure in Australian History =

1979 book by Terry Irving and Raewyn Connell

- Author: Terry Irving & Raewyn Connell
- Language: English
- Subject: Labour history Social history
- Genre: History
- Published: 1979
- Publisher: Longman Cheshire
- Publication place: Australia
- Pages: 378

Class Structure in Australian History is a work of Australian social history, written by Terry Irving and Raewyn Connell. Published in 1979 by Longman Cheshire, It is considered a definitive work of the Australian New Left. It studies the development of social classes, periodising the political economy of capitalism in Australia.

== Overview ==
Terry Irving and Raewyn Connell collaborated in the Radical Free University project in Sydney, and shared a concern with class methodology and the portrayal of resistance in social history. The aim of the project was the pursuit of socialist strategy, as they remarked: "Our intention is political —to help people gain a clear understanding of the patterns of class relations they live in and have to act on here and now". Furthermore, taking inspiration from E.P. Thompson, they rejected a moralisation of the working class:

That the working class is essentially conservative, or naturally revolutionary, or invincibly racist—are all equally wrong. The working class are simply people, who improvise their lives in certain situations, which may or may not be changed by their responses
