= Eric Anderson (sociologist) =

American sociologist

- Born: January 18, 1968 (age 58)

Academic background
- Education: University of California Irvine
- Thesis: In the Game: Gay Athletes and the Cult of Masculinity (2004)

Academic work
- Institutions: University of Winchester
- Main interests: Masculinities, sexualities, sport

Eric Anderson (born January 18, 1968) is an American sociologist and sexologist specializing in adolescent men's gender and sexualities. He holds the position of Professor of Masculinities, Sexualities and Sport at the University of Winchester, in England. His research has been recognized for excellence by the British Academy of Social Sciences and he is an elected Fellow of the International Academy of Sex Research. Anderson is an advocate for the inclusion of gay men in sport and is America's first openly gay high-school coach, having come out at Huntington Beach High School, the same high-school that produced the nation's first openly gay, professional team sport athlete, Robbie Rogers who recently played for LA Galaxy.

== Background ==
Eric Anderson earned a B.A. from California State University, Long Beach in 1990; a California State Teaching Credential in 1991; and an M.A. in Sport Psychology in 1993. From the University of California, Irvine, Anderson earned an M.A in Sociology in 2002 and a Ph.D. in 2004 with a dissertation that became his book In the Game: Gay Athletes and the Cult of Masculinity, which the American Library Association recognized as Outstanding Academic Title for that year (2005). Before joining the University of Winchester in 2011, Anderson completed post-doctoral work with Michael Kimmel at the State University of New York, Stony Brook. He then worked as an assistant professor at the University of Bath from 2005 to 2010, as well as a visiting professor at the University of California Irvine. He was promoted to professor in 2011 and given a chair in Masculinities, Sexualities and Sport.

== Scholarship ==
His autobiography, Trailblazing, documents the story of his coming out as the first openly gay high school coach in the U.S., which Booklist described as, "quite possibly the best coming-out story ever told". Also recognizing this book, the journal, Sociology of Sport Journal, held a symposium on its relevance to understanding decreasing homophobia in sport.

His book Inclusive Masculinity: The Changing Nature of Masculinities changed the way masculinity scholars theorized the relationship between masculinity and homophobia. His theory, Inclusive Masculinity Theory, and its embedded notion of homohysteria, explains how homophobia regulates gender. In subsequent works, Anderson uses empirical evidence to show that young heterosexual men's masculinities are becoming softer and more inclusive. His (2014) book 21st Century Jocks: Sporting Men and Contemporary Heterosexuality documents heterosexual men cuddling in bed together, kissing each other on the lips, and engaging in intense emotional intimacy with other men, something known as a bromance.

Anderson's scholarship also examines the monogamy. His (2012) book, The Monogamy Gap: Men, Love and the Reality of Cheating with Oxford University Press argues that monogamy causes difficulties in relationships, and thus cheating becomes a rational response to the unreasonable cultural mandates of sexual fidelity. His work on monogamy also examines why middle-age women cheat, he argued that it is not because they are emotionally unfulfilled, but instead, like men, they desire sex outside of the relationship.

Anderson's primary research partner is Dr Mark McCormack. Together, in a Sex Roles symposium they examine and advance the notion of homohysteria. Anderson and McCormack also have developed the understanding that decreasing cultural homophobia positively impacts the lives of bisexual men and bisexual women. They have a forthcoming book with Columbia University Press, that examines bisexual men's lives in Los Angeles, New York and London, research that has been funded by the American Institute of Bisexuality and has been featured by The New York Times.

Anderson is a critical scholar of team sports, authoring a number of books examining its functions, purposes and problems. Oxford Bibliographies in Sociology lists his (2010) book Sport Theory and Social Problems as a top 10 book about sport theory. In a co-edited volume, with Professor Jennifer Hargreaves, Routledge Handbook of Sport, Gender and Sexuality, sport is criticized for producing a gender binary, transphobia and patriarchy. Anderson instead advocates for participation in exercise and fitness, including distance running, for which he has authored two books: Training Games Coaching and Racing Creatively (2006) and The Runners Textbook (2009).

== Published books ==
- Training Games: Coaching & Racing Creatively. Mountain View, CA: Tafnews Press, 1994, 1996, 2006
- Trailblazing: The True Story of America's First Openly Gay Track Coach. Los Angeles, CA: Alyson Books, 2000.
- In the Game: Gay Athletes and the Cult of Masculinity. State University of New York Press, 2005. This book is based on interviews with 60 gay athletes from North America. Forty interviewees were openly gay while 20 were still in the closet.
- The Runner's Textbook. BookSurge Publishing, 2009. This textbook describes the physiological, psychological and sociological aspects of running, and includes racing strategies for long-distance runners.
- Inclusive Masculinity: The Changing Nature of Masculinities. New York: Routledge, 2009.
- Sport, Theory and Social Problems: A Critical Introduction. London: Routledge, 2010.
- The Monogamy Gap: Men, Love and the Reality of Cheating. New York: Oxford University Press, 2012.
- Sport, Masculinities and Sexualities. London: Routledge, 2013.
- Routledge Handbook of Sport, Gender and Sexuality. London: Routledge, 2014.
- 21st Century Jocks: Sporting Men and Contemporary Heterosexuality. Basingstoke: Palgrave-Macmillan, 2014.
- He's Hot, She's Hot, So What? The Changing Dynamics of Bisexual Men's Lives. New York: Columbia University Press. Forthcoming.
