= Aschiana =

ASCHIANA Afghanistan's Children - A New Approach
- Company type: non-profit
- Industry: Children's rights
- Founded: 1995
- Founder: Engineer Yousef
- Headquarters: Kabul, Afghanistan
- Number of locations: Kabul, Mazar-i-Sharif, Herat and Parwan

Afghanistan's Children - A New Approach (ASCHIANA) (Persian: اشیانه Ašiyānā, meaning "the nest") is an Afghan nongovernmental organisation that has provided services, support and programs to working street children and their families since 1995. ASCHIANA currently serves 4,500 students in Afghanistan through centers in Kabul, Mazar-i-Sharif, Herat and Parwan. ASCHIANA operates four centres in Kabul: two centres for basic education, one centre for accelerated girls' education and one emergency shelter for runaway children (with day care and basic education). ASCHIANA also provides basic education for internally displaced persons and returned refugees through five outreach areas in Kabul.

== Work ==
ASCHIANA works together with Afghanistan's Ministry of Education, Ministry of Social Affairs and the Afghan National Police to help children on the street receive a basic education—in Dari, Pashto, English, mathematics, Islamic Education, health education, mine awareness, drug awareness and children's rights—and integrate into the formal school system.

ASCHIANA students also enjoy recreational activities through sports, music and art, and receive training in skills such as carpentry, woodworking, cosmetology, tailoring, painting, instrument making, electrical engineering and plumbing. ASCHIANA also provides health, financial and social support for students and their families.

ASCHIANA's students work on the streets to provide an income for their families. Many of them have lost one or both parents and have become their household's main source of income. ASCHIANA's goals are to support these children and their families:

- by providing a basic education, school supplies and a warm meal;
- by offering children a safe environment to learn and develop;
- by promoting safe, well-informed livelihoods;
- by building children's capacities through social and vocational skills training, and;
- by giving street-working children an opportunity to pursue further education.

== Reception ==
ASCHIANA's work has been highlighted in research by Terre des Hommes and the Afghanistan Research and Evaluation Unit (AREU) and has received support for its operations from Roshan and Siemens (among other sources).
