= Inclusive masculinity =

Theory of contemporary social changes affecting masculinity

Inclusive masculinity is an approach to thinking about masculinity in the context of social changes that have undermined traditional hegemonic masculinity and its associated homophobia, which each have driven men to avoid certain behaviors in order to avoid being publicly perceived as gay; it holds that there are increasingly societal spaces in which men no longer need to behave in hypermasculine ways in order to be accepted. When this occurs, men can engage in a variety of previously feminine practices without the fear of being perceived gay or weak.

The theory was published in 2009 by Eric Anderson in a book called "Inclusive Masculinity". and further elaborated by Mark McCormack in a 2012 book.

It can be contrasted with views of contemporary masculinity as being a crisis and in need of restoration.
