= Society for the Protection of the Rights of the Child =

Pakistani rights organisation

- Abbreviation: SPARC
- Formation: 17 December 1992; 33 years ago
- Type: NGO
- Purpose: Child rights
- Headquarters: Islamabad, Lahore
- Region served: Pakistan
- Members: Private
- Website: sparcpk.org

The Society for the Protection of the Rights of the Child (SPARC) is a Pakistani independent non-governmental organization dedicated to protecting the rights of children.

== Mission ==
SPARC was established as an advocacy group for children's rights. Initially focused on promoting and protecting breastfeeding, it has expanded to child labour, juvenile justice, education and violence against children. It has held "children's parliaments" and worked to end corporal punishment in Pakistani schools.

== Operations ==
SPARC was officially established on 17 December 1992, in Islamabad, Pakistan. SPARC's governing body is run by a board of directors. While the headquarters is located in Islamabad, it has offices in Lahore, Karachi, Peshawar and Quetta, Hyderabad, Multan and Nowshera. 54 Child Rights Committees consisting of local activists operate at the district level.

SPARC has consultative status with the United Nations Economic and Social Council and the United Nations Department of Public Information. It is a partner of Defence for Children International. In 2003, SPARC received the United Nations Recognition Award for highlighting the plight of children and promoting the rights of children in Pakistan. In 2006, SPARC received USAID certification.

SPARC is a member of the Pakistan National Alliance and the International Baby Food Action Network.

== Successes ==
The Protection of Breastfeeding and Young Child Nutrition Ordinance, drafted by founding SPARC member Anees Jillani, was signed in October 2002 and came into force in 2010. It superseded the National Infant Feeding Board Rules of 2004. The ordinance has also been adopted by Gilgit-Baltistan, which has special status under a Presidential Order.
