= Gender and Education =

- Discipline: Gender studies, education
- Language: English
- Edited by: Carol Taylor; Susanne Gannon; Jayne Osgood; Kathryn Scantlebury

Publication details
- History: 1989–present
- Publisher: Taylor and Francis (United Kingdom)
- Frequency: 8/year
- Impact factor: 2.081 (2020)

Standard abbreviations
- ISO 4: Gend. Educ.

Indexing
- ISSN: 0954-0253 (print); 1360-0516 (web)
- OCLC no.: 19946680

Links
- Journal homepage; Online access; Online archive

Gender and Education is a peer-reviewed journal, published eight times a year by Taylor and Francis with a focus on global perspectives on education, gender and culture.

The journal is aligned with the Gender and Education Association (GEA), and is co-edited by Carol Taylor (University of Cambridge), Susanne Gannon (Western Sydney University), Jayne Osgood (Middlesex University) and Kathryn Scantlebury (University of Delaware).

== Gender Differences in Teaching ==
Between 1881 and 1930, teaching was one of the more popular careers, yet it was still new to society to have both genders teach young minds. Women were still new to the work force and, although it took time to get used to, women in the field of education raised from 55% to 75% in the United States. Soon, women dominated teaching careers, as they were thought of as more nurturing, and men sought to find other opportunities. This created the social stigma of teaching being more of a feminine career.

== Differences of gender in Education ==
Race and class are one of the biggest forms of inequality, but gender oppression has been most prominent for a longer amount of time. Girls are more often ignored by teachers compared to boys, having their educational needs put on the backburner, causing girls to suffer not only in education, but psychologically. Because of teacher neglect, girls are more prone to eating disorders, depression, loss in confidence, and self-mutilation. Their academic scores also falter, science and math being the two subjects that are affected the most, and don't receive acknowledgement as frequently as their boy peers. If they do, it isn't as constructive.

A study of the reading progression between 15 year old boys and girls show that girls score higher in reading than boys, making boys more resentful of girls. The favoritism for boy's education makes it more difficult for girls to move on to higher education because boy's test scores are holding them back. Even though girls are excelling, educators will not allow for boys to fall so far behind, which suppresses college enrollment for both genders.

== Abstracting and indexing ==
- Academic Search
- Advanced Placement Source
- ASSIA
- Australian Education Index
- British Education Index
- Contemporary Women's Issues
- Current Abstracts
- Current Contents
- Dietrich's Index Philosophicus
- Education Research Index
- Education Source
- Education Resources Information Center (ERIC)
- Educational Administration Abstracts
- Educational Research Abstracts online (ERA)
- European Reference Index for the Humanities
- Pedagogical and Educational Research (ERIH)
- Feminist Periodicals
- Gender Studies Database
- International Bibliography of Periodical Literature (IBZ)
- Professional Development Collection
- ProQuest
- Public Affairs Index
- Research into Higher Education Abstracts
- SCOPUS
- Social Sciences Citation Index
- SocINDEX
- Studies on Women and Gender Abstracts
- Teacher Reference Center
- Web of Science
- Women's Studies International

According to the Journal Citation Reports, the journal has a 2020 impact factor of 2.081, ranking it 152nd out of 254 journals in the category "Education & Educational Research".
