= Men's Studies Press =

- Status: Defunct (2016)
- Founded: 1992
- Defunct: 2016
- Country of origin: United States
- Headquarters location: Harriman, Tennessee
- Nonfiction topics: Men's studies
- Official website: http://www.mensstudies.info,%20http://www.mensstudies.com/

Men's Studies Press (MSP) was an academic publisher registered in Harriman, Tennessee, from 1992. They produced three journals, and also published monographs and collections of essays. Starting in July 2007, MSP also administered a website – MensStudies.info – of resources related to men's studies. They ceased publishing in 2016.

== Past mission statement ==
The Men's Studies Press is committed to serving the men's studies community and others by publishing scholarly materials; by creating and publishing timely special materials for unique men's studies market niches; by responding promptly to all customers' needs; by treating our internal and external corporate family with respect and fairness; by supporting professionals, teachers, and students who explore men's lives and/or men's issues; and, finally, by promoting values that honor and respect all.

== Journals ==
- The Journal of Men's Studies (ISSN 1060-8265, 1992-2014), published by SAGE Publications as of 2015.
- International Journal of Men's Health (ISSN 1532-6306, since 2002)
- Fathering: A Journal of Theory, Research, and Practice about Men as Fathers (ISSN 1537-6680, since 2003)
- Thymos: Journal of Boyhood Studies (ISSN 1931-9045, 2007-2013), published by Berghahn Books as of 2015, under the new name, Boyhood Studies: An Interdisciplinary Journal.
- Culture, Society and Masculinities (ISSN 1941-5583, since 2009)

== Monographs ==
- Frieman, Barry. The Divorcing Father's Manual: 8 Steps to Help You and Your Children Survive and Thrive. MPS, 2005. ISBN 1-931342-02-4
- Gray, Ross. Prostate Tales: Men's Experiences with Prostate Cancer. MSP, 2003. ISBN 1-931342-00-8
- Janssen, Diederik. International guide to literature on masculinity: a bibliography. MPS, March 2008. ISBN 978-1-931342-17-9 (pbk. : alk. paper) -- ISBN 978-1-931342-18-6 (electronic)
- Lee, Terry. A New Path at Midlife: Transformative Relationship & Story for Men. MSP, 2007. ISBN 978-1-931342-08-7
- Sargent, Paul. Real Men or Real Teachers? Contradictions in the Lives of Men Elementary School Teachers. MPS, 2001. ISBN 0-9671794-3-2

== Essay collections ==
- Botherson, Sean E. and Joseph M. White (editors). Why Fathers Count: The Importance of Fathers and Their Involvement with Children. MSP, 2007. ISBN 978-1-931342-05-6
- Focus on Fathers and Fatherhood. MSP, 2007. ISBN 978-1-931342-10-0
- Josep M. Armengol and Àngels Carabí (editors). Debating Masculinities. MSP, 2009. ISBN 978-1-931342-19-3

== See also ==
- Men's studies
- Gender studies
- Women's studies
