= Afghanistan Research and Evaluation Unit =

Afghan research organization

The Afghanistan Research and Evaluation Unit Organization (AREUO) is an independent research organization based in Kabul, Afghanistan. It aims to provide a firm basis for policy and practice in the country's rapidly changing environment by conducting in-depth, on-the-ground research. Funding is provided by a variety of governments and agencies.

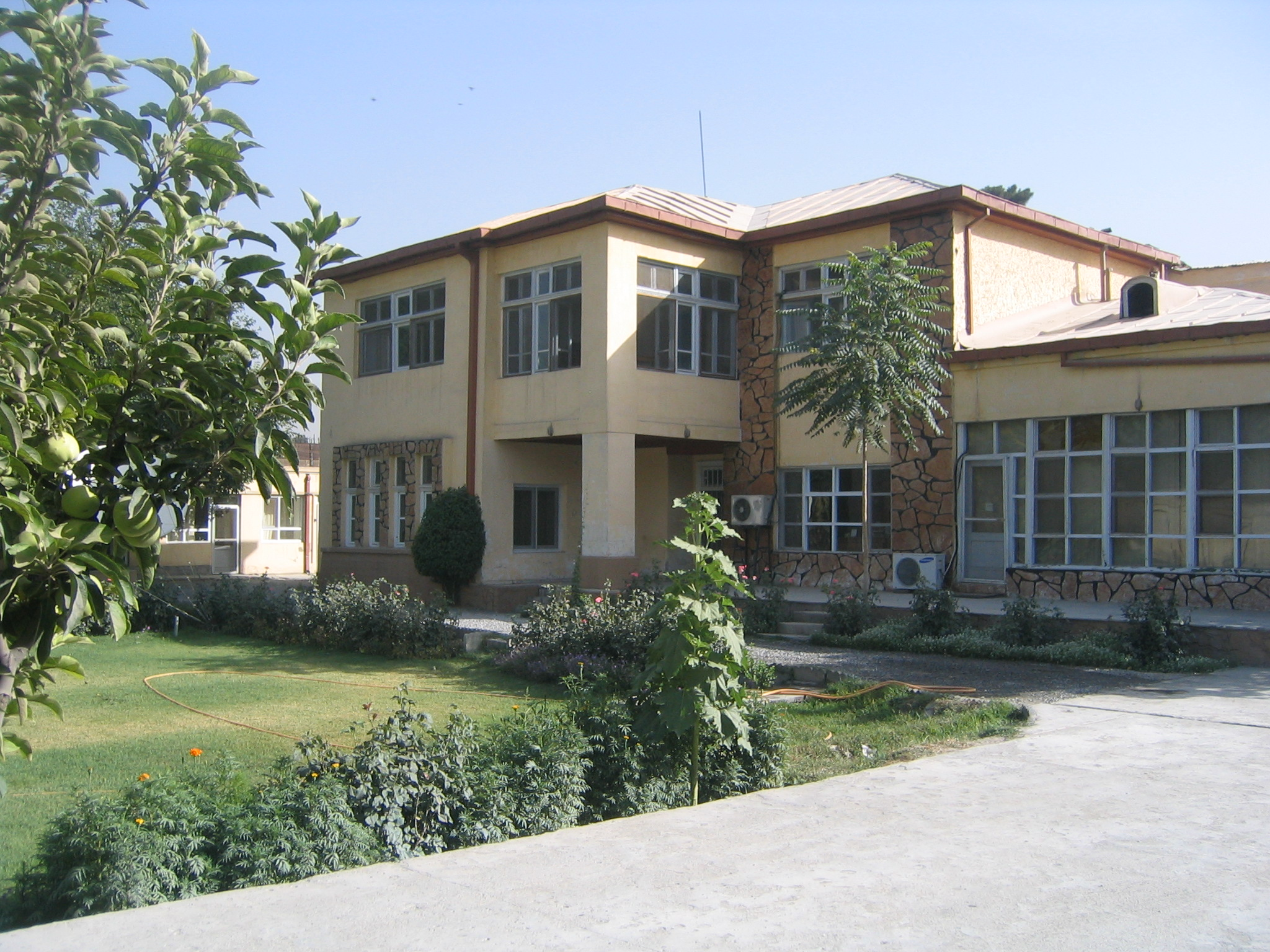
AREUO office in Kabul

== History ==
In 2000, the Strategic Monitoring Unit (SMU) was established in Islamabad by the Afghan Support Group, to improve emergency response by ensuring that lessons learned from similar situations around the world were analysed and disseminated (at that time Afghanistan was largely under Taliban rule). The SMU produced two papers:

- A report on the northern province of Badakhshan, and
- A review of the Strategic Framework for Afghanistan.

After the toppling of the Taliban government in late 2001, the SMU was renamed the Afghanistan Research and Evaluation Unit (AREU) and given a new mandate. In early 2002, it moved to Kabul.

== Sample of Recent Projects ==
AREUO's research focuses on areas and issues of importance to policy makers. Current research themes are: governance, gender, livelihoods and human security, natural resource management, political economy and markets.

Natural Resource Management (2010–12): An integrated project on rural water management and opium poppy cultivation in the provinces of Helmand, Nangahrar, Balkh and Badakhshan. The research aims to investigate how the River Basin Management (RBM) model is progressing in the EU-supported Panj-Amu River Basin Management Programme (P-ARBP) and the prospects of its replication in other river basins in Afghanistan. It also seek to facilitate the achievement of rural livelihood security and stability in Afghanistan by exploring the dynamics of the opium economy in the 2010-11 growing season and beyond.

Women's Participation in Development (2012): The research examines the various assumptions that justify the “gender-inclusive” development initiatives of some of the national development programmes and the micro-finance institutions. It particularly examines the assumption that women's participation in community organisation or development projects at the community level serves to “empower” them as individuals and as a group. It also explores what motivates and enables women to participate in these different programmes and what limits their participation. Finally, it provides an analysis of the different models and methods being used by facilitating partners involved in different national development programmes, and how these impact women's ability to participate and the effects of such participation.

== Communicating our Research ==
AREUO actively disseminates its research, which is always made publicly available and free of charge.

Publications: All AREUO publications are available online and in hardcopy, with many translated into Dari and Pashto. These range from in-depth provincial case studies to peer-reviewed policy briefs and professionally published reports.

Events and briefings: AREUO regularly convenes events such as public seminars, roundtable discussions and press conferences. Meanwhile, staff frequently provide private briefings to Afghan and international policymakers.

== Library ==
An important complement to the research and publications of AREUO is the library. Since the formation of the unit, statistical publications, NGO reports, policy papers and similar materials have been accumulated and indexed in the AREUO Library on-line bibliographic database (built using Greenstone open source software). The library is open to the public and collaborates with other libraries in Kabul to collect and make available publicly documents of research value on Afghanistan.
