= Crossroads International =

Canadian international development organization

Crossroads International Logo

Crossroads International is a Canadian international development organization based in Toronto and Montréal. Funded partly by the Canadian International Development Agency (CIDA), Crossroads is dedicated to advancing the rights of women and girls and reducing poverty in West Africa, Southern Africa, and Bolivia.

== Mission and values ==
Crossroads International works to create a more equitable and sustainable world by engaging and strengthening individuals, organizations and communities through mutual learning, solidarity and collective action. That mission goes hand in hand with the vision central to Crossroads International's efforts, One world where poverty is eliminated, equality prevails and the rights of women and girls are fulfilled. Crossroads International believes in active citizenship, equity and diversity, solidarity between the North and South, innovation and learning, as well as transparency and accountability.

== History ==
Crossroads International, originally established under the name Operation Crossroads Africa, was founded in 1958 by the American preacher James Herman Robinson, who promoted his vision of One World. He believed that people are fundamentally more similar than dissimilar, and that by living and working together we can create a crossroads of cultures and personal experience that ultimately supports positive individual and social change. In the context of the civil rights movement in the United States, Robinson's innovative and inclusive ideas of encouraging collaboration between black and white Canadians, Americans and Africans in development projects drew many volunteers. That is how Peter Parris became the first Crossroader to head overseas when he volunteered in Nigeria in 1958.

The number of mandates quickly multiplied. Ten volunteers went abroad in 1960 and by 1969, 257 volunteers had taken part in overseas activities. In 1969, Canadian Crossroads International was granted a charter as a charitable organization, separate from Operation Crossroads Africa, and for the first time began working in countries outside the African continent. That same year, a francophone branch was founded in Montreal, which managed placements in French-speaking African countries. In 1971, Crossroads began its To-Canada program, bringing African participants to Canada. This was followed by the Interflow program, an innovative South-South exchange program. In 2011, the organization's current name, Crossroads International, was officially adopted to mark the truly international nature of its work.

== Present day ==
To date, more than 8,000 volunteer mandates have been organized by Crossroads International. Based in Toronto and Montréal, Crossroads now works with partners in West Africa, Southern Africa and South America (Bolivia). Crossroads International is present in eight countries, with over 25 projects and partners. The promotion of the rights of women and girls and a focus on poverty reduction and sustainable livelihoods are central to Crossroads International programming. Crossroads International is a member of the Association québécoise des organismes de coopération international (AQOCI). Crossroads International also participates in the Ministry of International Relations' Québec sans frontières (QSF) program, allowing young people from Quebec to participate in an international cooperation experience abroad.

Crossroads' model of volunteer cooperation has provided many memorable and rewarding experiences for Crossroaders, including the writer Lawrence Hill. This year, Hill won Radio-Canada's Combat des Livres contest for his novel The Book of Negroes, which was inspired by his years of work with Crossroads International in Western Africa. As well as a Crossroaders, Ann McCain Evans starts in 1976 when she volunteered with Crossroads on placement in Ethiopia. Then, she was a Special Assistant to the Hon. Gerald Regan in Ottawa from 1981 to 1984 and later operated her own retail gift basket company for several years. Also, Lyse Doucet is a Senior Presenter and Correspondent for BBC World television and BBC World Service radio. She is often deployed to anchor special news coverage from the field, including major natural disasters. Her first overseas experience was with Crossroads International, when she volunteered in Côte d'Ivoire in 1982. Audrey McLaughlin volunteered in Barbados with Crossroads International in 1986. Then she was elected to the House of Commons for the Yukon as a member of the New Democratic Party in a by-election in 1987 and re-elected in the general elections of 1988 and 1993. Chosen as Leader of the Party on December 2, 1989, McLaughlin became the first woman to lead a major federal party in Canada. She led the party for the next six years.

Senator Donald H. Oliver went overseas with Crossroads in 1962, completing a placement in Ethiopia. After being called to the Bar in Nova Scotia, Senator Oliver built a highly successful practice as a civil litigator and taught law at several universities. Later, as a highly respected member of the Conservative Caucus and chair of Senate Standing Committees, he has advanced public policy in areas ranging from finance, agriculture, forestry, communications and transportation to banking, trade, commerce, human rights and employment equity. Also as a Crossroaders, Dr. Peter Parris was the first Canadian to go overseas with Operation Crossroads Africa, volunteering in Nigeria in 1958. He is now Professor Emeritus with Princeton Theological Seminary. He is past president of the Society for the Study of Black Religion, the American Academy of Religion, and the Society of Christian Ethics. Paris is the senior editor of the New York University series Religion, Race, and Ethnicity, general editor of The History of the Riverside Church in New York City, and serves on the editorial boards of several journals. J. Robert S. Prichard is chairman of Torys, a highly respected international business law firm. He is also President Emeritus of the University of Toronto where he previously served as dean of law and as a professor specializing in law and economics. He is an Officer of the Order of Canada, a Member of the Order of Ontario and a Fellow of the Royal Society of Canada. Mr. Prichard volunteered with Crossroads International in Zambia in 1969. Finally, Betty Plewes has spent most of her career working in international cooperation. Following several volunteer placements in a number of African countries, she filled various senior management roles at CUSO. Plewes has been engaged with Crossroads International for many years; first as a volunteer in 1964 (Ethiopia) and 1968 (Liberia). She was appointed Executive Secretary in 1968. Then, in 2004 she joined the Board or Directors serving three terms ending in 2010.
