= Fathering (journal) =

- Discipline: Men's studies
- Language: English

Publication details
- History: 2003—present (Discontinued)
- Publisher: Men's Studies Press (United States)
- Frequency: Triannual
- Open access: delayed

Standard abbreviations
- ISO 4: Fathering

Indexing
- ISSN: 1537-6680 (print); 1933-026X (web)

Links
- Journal homepage

Fathering: A Journal of Theory, Research, and Practice about Men as Fathers, is a peer-reviewed academic journal established in 2003 as the third of five published by Men's Studies Press and the first worldwide to focus specifically on fatherhood. Editor-in-Chief is Jaipaul Roopnarine.

== See also ==
- Men's studies
- Gender studies
