= Anna Hickey-Moody =

Australian academic

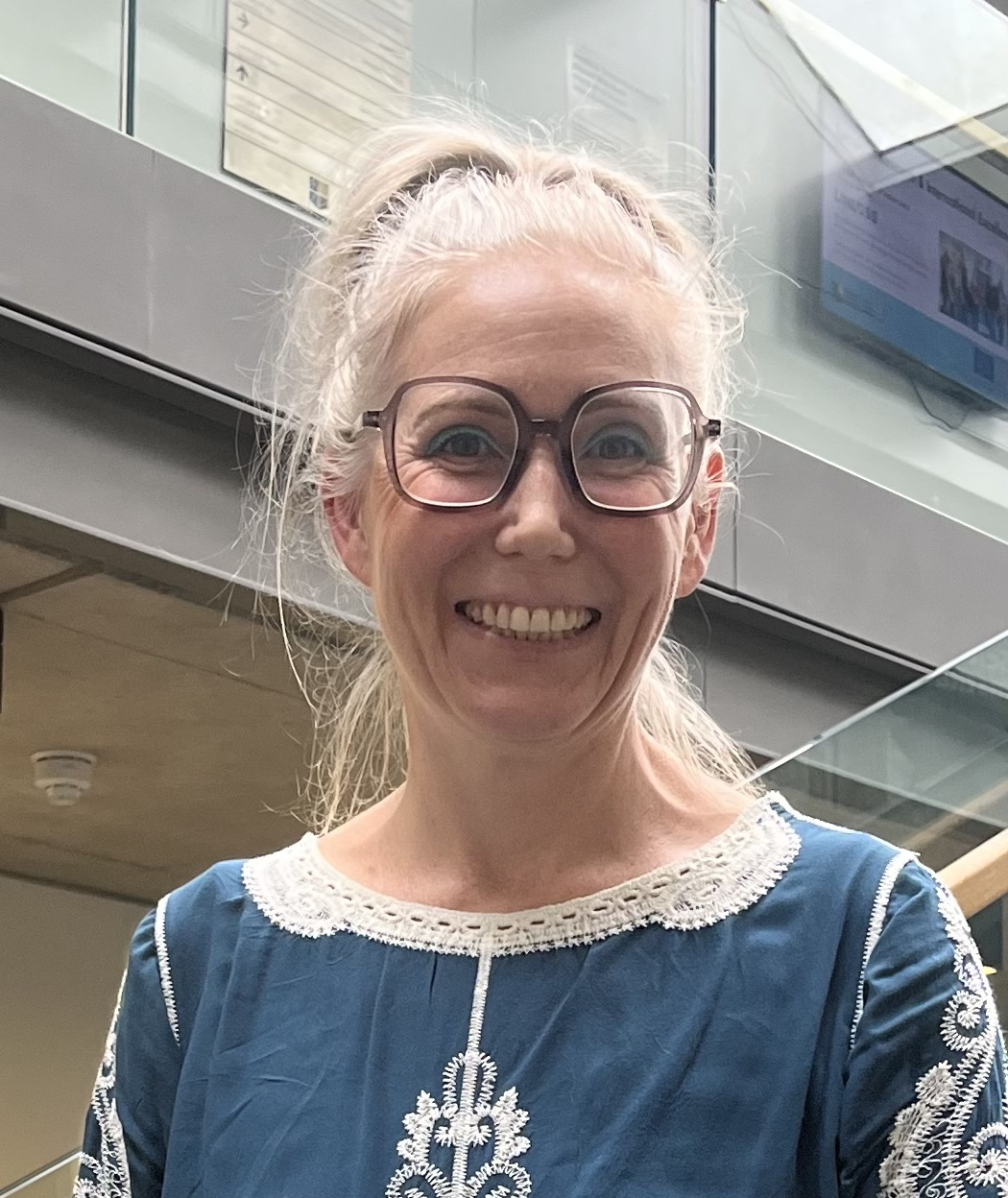
- Born: Australia
- Occupation: Professor

Academic background
- Education: University of Adelaide, University of South Australia

Academic work
- Discipline: Cultural Studies
- Institutions: University of South Australia, Monash University, University of Sydney, Goldsmiths, University of London, University of Sydney, Maynooth University
- Website: https://www.maynoothuniversity.ie/faculty-arts-humanities/our-people/anna-hickey-moody

Anna Hickey-Moody is an Australian academic specialising in cultural studies. She is a professor of intersectional humanities at Maynooth University, Ireland. She is also affiliated with media and communication at RMIT University. Hickey-Moody holds an Australian Research Council Future Fellowship (2017–2021).

== Education ==
Hickey-Moody completed a Bachelor of Arts (Social Anthropology, Theatre Studies) at the University of Adelaide. She completed her PhD at the University of South Australia on the work of Restless Dance Theatre.

== Career ==
Hickey-Moody worked at the University of South Australia as a lecturer from 2000 to 2005.

From 2004 to 2007, Hickey-Moody was awarded a Postdoctoral Research Fellowship at Monash University where she worked on the Youth Arts Beyond Risk project. The book based on this work is called Youth, Arts and Education and was published with Routledge in 2013.

Hickey Moody later went on to lecture at Monash University from 2007 to 2009, during which time she co-founded and led the Space, Place and Body Research Group.

In 2009, Hickey-Moody moved to the University of Sydney where she held a number of teaching and supervision positions, including working as the Departmental Undergraduate Coordinator until 2013. During this time she also published Unimaginable Bodies (Sense/Brill) and a number of edited collections.

Between 2013 and 2016, Hickey-Moody worked at Goldsmiths, University of London, where she was the director of the Centre for Arts and Learning and the head of the PhD in Arts and Learning. While at Goldsmiths College, Hickey-Moody also co-founded the Disability Research Centre and held a number of teaching positions.

In 2016, Hickey-Moody was made associate professor in the Department of Gender and Cultural Studies at the University of Sydney.

In 2017, Hickey-Moody was made professor of media and communications at RMIT University, where she continues to work (as of September 2020). At RMIT Hickey-Moody is a core member of the Digital Ethnography Research Centre, leading the Creative Research Interventions in Methods and Practice (CRiMP) lab.

Hickey-Moody was awarded an Australian Research Council Future Fellowship in 2017. She currently acts as project lead for the Future Fellowship project: “Interfaith Childhoods”.

Hickey-Moody is a visiting research fellow with the Education and Social Research Institute at the Manchester Metropolitan University and a visiting professor in sociology at Goldsmiths, University of London.

== Expertise and research areas ==
Hickey-Moody is considered a leading expert in art-based research practices, Deleuzian theory and affect theory. Hickey-Moody uses a philosophically informed cultural studies approach to her research, working in both qualitative and quantitative research methods. She is known for her work with young people, people with disabilities, migrant communities, and marginalised communities.

== Selected publications ==
- Hickey-Moody, Anna (2020). "Faith". Philosophy Today. 63. doi:10.5840/philtoday202019302.
- Hickey-Moody, Anna (2019). "New Materialism, Ethnography, and Socially Engaged Practice: Space-Time Folds and the Agency of Matter". Qualitative Inquiry. doi:10.1177/1077800419830138.
- Hickey-Moody, Anna (2019). Deleuze and Masculinity. New York: Palgrave Macmillan.
- Harwood, Valerie; Hickey-Moody, Anna; et al. (2018). The Politics of Widening Participation and University Access for Young People. Oxon, United Kingdom: Routledge.
- Hickey-Moody, Anna (2017). "Arts Practice as Method, Urban Spaces and Intra-Active Faiths". International Journal of Inclusive Education. 21: 1083–1096.
- Hickey-Moody, Anna (2017). "Integrated Dance as a Public Pedagogy of the Body". Social Alternatives. 36: 5–13.
- Hickey-Moody, Anna (2013). Youth, Arts and Education: Reassembling Subjectivity through Affect. New York: Routledge.
- Hickey-Moody, Anna (2009). Unimaginable Bodies: Intellectual Disability, Performance and Becomings. Rotterdam: Sense Publishers.
- Kenway, Jane; Kraack, Anna; Hickey-Moody, Anna (2006). Masculinity Beyond the Metropolis. Basingstoke: Palgrave Macmillan.
