= 1960 United States presidential election in California =

- November 8, 1960
- Turnout: 88.32% (of registered voters) ▲1.76 pp 68.77% (of eligible voters) ▲1.18 pp

Nominee	Richard Nixon	John F. Kennedy
Party	Republican	Democratic
Home state	California	Massachusetts
Running mate	Henry Cabot Lodge Jr.	Lyndon B. Johnson
Electoral vote	32	0
Popular vote	3,259,722	3,224,099
Percentage	50.10%	49.55%
County results
Nixon
40–50%
50–60%
60–70%
70–80%
Kennedy
40–50%
50–60%
60–70%
President before election
Dwight D. Eisenhower
Republican
Elected President
John F. Kennedy
Democratic

The 1960 United States presidential election in California took place on November 8, 1960, as part of the 1960 United States presidential election. State voters chose 32 representatives, or electors, to the Electoral College, who voted for president and vice president.

California voted for the Republican nominee, Vice President Richard Nixon, over the Democratic nominee, Massachusetts Senator John F. Kennedy. Although California was Nixon's home state, which he represented in the House and Senate, and initial political base, his margin of victory over Kennedy turned out to be extremely narrow; in fact, it was the closest of the states that Nixon won, and the fourth closest state in the election after Hawaii, Illinois and Missouri. On the morning of November 9, the NBC victory desk erroneously projected California for Kennedy.

Nixon would later win California again against Hubert Humphrey in 1968 and then against George McGovern in 1972. This was the first time since 1912 that the state voted for a losing candidate, as well as the first time since 1884 that the state backed a losing Republican candidate.

== Primaries ==
=== Democratic primary ===
California governor Pat Brown won the state's Democratic primary as a favorite son. This was the state's first presidential favorite son delegation since the creation of the presidential primary in 1912.

Kennedy had not come easily to his decision not to compete in the California primary, and had at one point tentatively filed to run in the primary. He had begun to contemplate the state's primary at an early stage in the development of his campaign. By early 1958, Kennedy's team had recognized the state to be a Democratic target for the midterm elections, since economic woes had weakened the Republican Party's strength in the state. This meant that the 1958 midterm election would serve to gauge the prospect of Democrats winning the state in the 1960 presidential election. In February 1958, Ted Sorensen spent $1,500 in order to commission a survey in California that would be conducted that March, coinciding with a two-day visit by Kennedy to the state. The survey showed Kennedy winning 55 to 45% in a then-hypothetical general election race against Nixon. The survey also demonstrated Kennedy to have a strong lead in California among Catholics, who constituted one-fifth of the state's populace.

Kennedy, however, remained undecided as to whether or not he would compete in the state's primary. In November 1958, the midterm elections delivered encouraging signs for Democratic prospects of carrying the state in 1960. Pat Brown had defeated the Nixon-backed Republican candidate, outgoing U.S. Senate Minority Leader William Knowland, in the state's gubernatorial election, and Democrat Clair Engle defeated the Nixon-backed Republican candidate, outgoing governor Goodwin Knight, in the race for the Senate seat being vacated by Knowland.

California was one of several large state delegations to the Democratic National Convention whose support the Kennedy campaign came to believe was integral when they mapped out his path to secure the nomination. The Kennedy campaign was concerned that Brown might run against Kennedy as a favorite son in the primary. Brown saw himself as a potential running mate on the Democratic ticket. However, he recognized that his chances of being selected would disappear if Kennedy were the presidential nominee, as Brown and Kennedy were both Catholics and a ticket composed of two Catholics was improbable. Thus, Brown recognized that he would need for Kennedy to lose the nomination if he were to stand a chance at securing the vice-presidential nomination for himself.

California's Democratic Party landscape at the time stood largely divided between Brown loyalists and Adlai Stevenson supporters, many of whom had hopes of nominating Stevenson a third consecutive time. Kennedy's campaign began to consider the possibility of pursuing a compromise with Brown in which he would run as a favorite candidate committed to Kennedy. Such a compromise would have granted Brown the profile and ego boost of winning the state's primary, while allowing Kennedy to eschew a scenario in which he could underperform or be defeated in one of the last primaries, which would weaken the momentum he needed to have heading into the convention. It would also have avoided the risk of dividing the state party, which was important since a divided state party would have decimated any chance Kennedy stood of carrying the state in the general election. At the same time, such a compromise would still have secured the support of California's delegation for Kennedy. Kennedy's campaign decided that, so long as their candidate still had momentum from having won primaries in other key states, there would be no problem in having Brown run as a surrogate candidate in California. To help persuade Brown to be inclined towards such an agreement, Larry O'Brien met with Brown on behalf of the campaign and showed him polling that Louis Harris had conducted for them which showed Kennedy winning the state 60% to 40% in a two-way race against Brown and was also beating him in a three-way matchup featuring Humphrey, polling 47% against Brown's 33% and Humphrey's 20%. The campaign ultimately reached an informal agreement with Brown to have him run, pledged to Kennedy, as a favorite son.

Despite their informal agreement with Brown, Kennedy's campaign continued to possess worries about the state's primary. They were uncertain as to what degree Brown was intent on honoring their agreement. They also recognized that there was a potential that Stevenson might run in the state's primary. Another concern involved the candidacy of Hubert Humphrey. Kennedy's team believed that there was a possibility that Humphrey might file to run in the state. While Kennedy's campaign strategy aimed to have killed Humphrey's candidacy well in advance of the California primary by dealing him critical defeats in earlier primaries, they were still somewhat concerned about a potential scenario in which Kennedy would have failed to knock Humphrey out of the race and Humphrey ran in the California primary. They were worried that, in such an instance, Brown might prove to be a much less effective an opponent to Humphrey than Kennedy himself would be.

To precautionarily leave open the campaign's options, on the March 9 deadline to file for the primary, Kennedy filed his own slate of prospective delegates which would be, at least tentatively, registered to run against Brown's slate. Humphrey filed a slate of his own later that day. This blindsided Brown, who believed that he had secured promises from both candidates that neither of them would run against him in the California primary.

By the time of the California primary, Humphrey had already ended his campaign. Since he had only filed as a precaution for the possibility of Humphrey competing in California, Kennedy attempted to make peace. Kennedy withdrew, granting Brown the opportunity to run unopposed.

Feeling betrayed by Kennedy, Brown did not publicly endorse him, much to the chagrin of the Kennedy campaign. Brown, ultimately, held weak control over a fractious state delegation, whose ranks included a number of Stevenson loyalists, and Stevenson had left open the possibility of being drafted as a candidate at the convention. After failing to secure a public endorsement from Brown ahead of the convention, Kennedy and his team ultimately resorted to courting individual members of its delegation for their support.

180,000 people participated in other Democratic primaries, but abstained from the Democratic presidential primary.

1960 California Democratic Presidential Primary Results
Party	Candidate	Votes	Percentage
Democratic	Pat Brown	1,354,031	67.7%
Democratic	George H. McLain	646,387	32.3%
Totals		2,000,418	100.00%

=== Republican primary ===
Nixon won California's Republican primary, in which he was unopposed. 200,000 people participated in other Republican primaries, but abstained from the Republican presidential primary.

1960 California Republican Presidential Primary Results
Party	Candidate	Votes	Percentage
Republican	Richard Nixon	1,517,652	100.00%
Totals		1,517,652	100.00%

== Campaign ==
Viva Kennedy clubs were created and registered 150,000 Mexican-Americans to vote.

Whitaker and Baxter managed Nixon's campaign in the north while Baus and Ross managed his campaign in the south. Don Bradley, the executive secretary of the California Democratic Party, managed Kennedy's campaign in the north while Jesse M. Unruh managed his campaign in the south.

Kennedy was initially believed to have won the state on election night, but absentee ballots resulted in Nixon winning. This was the first time since the 1912 election that California supported the losing presidential candidate. The Democrats maintained their control over the state legislature in the concurrent elections.

== Results ==
1960 United States presidential election in California
Party	Candidate	Votes	Percentage	Electoral votes
Republican	Richard Nixon	3,259,722	50.10%	32
Democratic	John F. Kennedy	3,224,099	49.55%	0
Prohibition	Rutherford Decker	21,706	0.33%	0
No party	Eric Hass (write-in)	1,051	0.02%	0
Invalid or blank votes				—
Totals		6,506,578	100.00%	32
Voter turnout				—

=== Results by county ===
County	Richard Nixon Republican		John F. Kennedy Democratic		Various candidates Other parties		Margin		Total votes cast
County	#	%	#	%	#	%	#	%	Total votes cast
Alameda	183,354	45.61%	217,172	54.02%	1,474	0.37%	-33,818	-8.41%	402,000
Alpine	132	76.74%	40	23.26%	0	0.00%	92	53.48%	172
Amador	2,175	44.51%	2,690	55.04%	22	0.45%	-515	-10.53%	4,887
Butte	20,838	57.60%	15,163	41.92%	174	0.48%	5,675	15.68%	36,175
Calaveras	2,820	52.60%	2,509	46.80%	32	0.60%	311	5.80%	5,361
Colusa	2,497	51.37%	2,348	48.30%	16	0.33%	149	3.07%	4,861
Contra Costa	82,922	46.82%	93,622	52.86%	579	0.32%	-10,700	-6.04%	177,123
Del Norte	3,024	48.05%	3,225	51.24%	45	0.71%	-201	-3.19%	6,294
El Dorado	6,065	49.16%	6,175	50.05%	97	0.79%	-110	-0.89%	12,337
Fresno	57,930	44.32%	72,164	55.21%	608	0.47%	-14,234	-10.89%	130,702
Glenn	3,911	53.17%	3,410	46.36%	35	0.47%	501	6.81%	7,356
Humboldt	18,074	46.71%	20,391	52.70%	226	0.59%	-2,317	-5.99%	38,691
Imperial	10,606	53.55%	9,119	46.04%	81	0.41%	1,487	7.51%	19,806
Inyo	2,962	54.65%	2,443	45.07%	15	0.28%	519	9.58%	5,420
Kern	52,800	50.43%	51,440	49.13%	465	0.44%	1,360	1.30%	104,705
Kings	6,991	42.31%	9,439	57.13%	92	0.56%	-2,448	-14.82%	16,522
Lake	4,176	58.74%	2,897	40.75%	36	0.51%	1,279	17.99%	7,109
Lassen	2,365	40.24%	3,472	59.08%	40	0.68%	-1,107	-18.84%	5,877
Los Angeles	1,302,661	49.45%	1,323,818	50.25%	8,020	0.30%	-21,157	-0.80%	2,634,499
Madera	5,869	41.75%	8,126	57.81%	62	0.44%	-2,257	-16.06%	14,057
Marin	37,620	57.29%	27,888	42.47%	157	0.24%	9,732	14.82%	65,665
Mariposa	1,599	53.97%	1,338	45.16%	26	0.87%	261	8.81%	2,963
Mendocino	9,301	49.29%	9,476	50.21%	94	0.50%	-175	-0.92%	18,871
Merced	11,990	43.37%	15,545	56.23%	111	0.40%	-3,555	-12.86%	27,646
Modoc	1,839	51.80%	1,691	47.63%	20	0.57%	148	4.17%	3,550
Mono	912	66.33%	457	33.24%	6	0.43%	455	33.09%	1,375
Monterey	33,428	56.26%	25,805	43.43%	180	0.31%	7,623	12.83%	59,413
Napa	15,125	52.56%	13,499	46.91%	154	0.53%	1,626	5.65%	28,778
Nevada	5,419	53.44%	4,633	45.69%	89	0.87%	786	7.75%	10,141
Orange	174,891	60.81%	112,007	38.95%	701	0.24%	62,884	21.86%	287,599
Placer	10,439	43.75%	13,304	55.75%	120	0.50%	-2,865	-12.00%	23,863
Plumas	2,015	37.47%	3,333	61.97%	30	0.56%	-1,318	-24.50%	5,378
Riverside	65,855	56.15%	50,877	43.38%	544	0.47%	14,978	12.77%	117,276
Sacramento	84,252	43.26%	109,695	56.32%	809	0.42%	-25,443	-13.06%	194,756
San Benito	3,056	51.40%	2,876	48.38%	13	0.22%	180	3.02%	5,945
San Bernardino	99,481	52.00%	90,888	47.51%	944	0.49%	8,593	4.49%	191,313
San Diego	223,056	56.41%	171,259	43.31%	1,106	0.28%	51,797	13.10%	395,421
San Francisco	143,001	41.79%	197,734	57.78%	1,484	0.43%	-54,733	-15.99%	342,219
San Joaquin	48,441	52.85%	42,855	46.76%	361	0.39%	5,586	6.09%	91,657
San Luis Obispo	17,862	54.04%	14,975	45.30%	218	0.66%	2,887	8.74%	33,055
San Mateo	104,570	51.70%	97,154	48.04%	528	0.26%	7,416	3.66%	202,252
Santa Barbara	38,805	56.73%	29,409	42.99%	188	0.28%	9,396	13.74%	68,402
Santa Clara	131,735	52.67%	117,667	47.05%	690	0.28%	14,068	5.62%	250,092
Santa Cruz	24,858	59.61%	16,659	39.95%	187	0.44%	8,199	19.66%	41,704
Shasta	9,462	38.94%	14,691	60.45%	148	0.61%	-5,229	-21.51%	24,301
Sierra	576	46.79%	647	52.56%	8	0.65%	-71	-5.77%	1,231
Siskiyou	6,279	42.95%	8,245	56.40%	96	0.65%	-1,966	-13.45%	14,620
Solano	18,751	40.88%	26,977	58.81%	141	0.31%	-8,226	-17.93%	45,869
Sonoma	34,641	54.10%	29,147	45.52%	244	0.38%	5,494	8.58%	64,032
Stanislaus	30,213	49.62%	30,302	49.77%	375	0.61%	-89	-0.15%	60,890
Sutter	7,520	62.91%	4,379	36.63%	55	0.46%	3,141	26.28%	11,954
Tehama	5,522	49.96%	5,483	49.61%	47	0.43%	39	0.35%	11,052
Trinity	1,418	38.35%	2,262	61.17%	18	0.48%	-844	-22.82%	3,698
Tulare	29,456	53.97%	24,887	45.60%	239	0.43%	4,569	8.37%	54,582
Tuolumne	3,691	49.11%	3,781	50.31%	44	0.58%	-90	-1.20%	7,516
Ventura	35,074	49.59%	35,334	49.96%	315	0.45%	-260	-0.37%	70,723
Yolo	10,104	44.73%	12,395	54.87%	90	0.40%	-2,291	-10.14%	22,589
Yuba	5,293	51.72%	4,882	47.71%	58	0.57%	411	4.01%	10,233
Total	3,259,722	50.10%	3,224,099	49.55%	22,757	0.35%	35,623	0.55%	6,506,578

==== Counties that flipped from Republican to Democratic ====
- Alameda
- Contra Costa
- Del Norte
- El Dorado
- Humboldt
- Los Angeles
- Mendocino
- San Francisco
- Sierra
- Siskiyou
- Trinity
- Tuolumne
- Ventura

=== Results by congressional district ===
District	Kennedy	Nixon
1st	46.6%	53.4%
2nd	52.8%	47.2%
3rd	54.7%	45.3%
4th	51.2%	48.9%
5th	67.7%	32.3%
6th	54.2%	45.8%
7th	52.8%	47.2%
8th	55.1%	44.9%
9th	48.2%	51.8%
10th	46.2%	53.8%
11th	48.2%	51.8%
12th	44.2%	55.8%
13rd	45.7%	54.3%
14th	49%	51%
15th	55.2%	44.8%
16th	44.2%	55.8%
17th	52.2%	47.8%
18th	46.8%	53.2%
19th	65.6%	34.4%
20th	33.1%	66.9%
21st	45.7%	54.3%
22nd	48.3%	51.7%
23rd	58.1%	41.9%
24th	46.4%	53.6%
25th	42.8%	57.2%
26th	69%	31%
27th	47.7%	52.3%
28th	39.7%	60.3%
29th	44%	56%
30th	45.1%	54.9%

== Works cited ==
- Kallina, Edmund (1985). "Was the 1960 Presidential Election Stolen? The Case of Illinois". Presidential Studies Quarterly. 15 (1). Wiley-Blackwell: 113–118. JSTOR 27550168.
- Lee, Eugene; Buchanan, William (1961). "The 1960 Election in California". The Western Political Quarterly. 14 (1). University of Utah: 309–26. doi:10.2307/443852. JSTOR 443852.
