= 1972 United States presidential election in California =

- November 7, 1972
- Turnout: 82.13% (of registered voters) ▼3.62 pp 64.52% (of eligible voters) ▲2.18 pp

Nominee	Richard Nixon	George McGovern
Party	Republican	Democratic
Home state	California	South Dakota
Running mate	Spiro Agnew	Sargent Shriver
Electoral vote	45	0
Popular vote	4,602,096	3,475,847
Percentage	55.00%	41.54%
County results
Nixon
40–50%
50–60%
60–70%
McGovern
40–50%
50–60%
President before election
Richard Nixon
Republican
Elected President
Richard Nixon
Republican

The 1972 United States presidential election in California took place on November 7, 1972, as part of the 1972 United States presidential election. State voters chose 45 representatives, or electors, to the Electoral College, who voted for president and vice president.

California voted for the Republican incumbent, Richard Nixon, over the Democratic challenger, South Dakota Senator George McGovern. Nixon took 55.00% of the vote to McGovern's 41.54%, a margin of 13.46%. Though Nixon won a commanding victory in his home state over McGovern, this result nevertheless meant California voted almost ten points to the left of the nation at large and was one of McGovern's strongest states in the 1972 election.

Nixon had previously won California against John F. Kennedy in 1960 and then against Hubert Humphrey in 1968. This was the first presidential election in which California had the most electoral college votes as a result of the 1970 census, a status it has maintained ever since.

== Primaries ==
=== Democratic ===
1972 California Democratic Party presidential primary
- June 6, 1972

Candidate	George McGovern	Hubert Humphrey	George Wallace
Home state	South Dakota	Minnesota	Alabama
Popular vote	1,550,652	1,375,064	268,551
Percentage	43.50%	38.58%	7.53%
County Results
McGovern
30-40%
40-50%
50-60%
60-70%
Humphrey
30-40%
40-50%

George McGovern would defeat previous Democratic nominee, Hubert Humphrey, by just under 200,000 votes.

Democratic Primary – June 6, 1972
Party	Candidate	Votes	%
Democratic	George McGovern	1,550,652	43.50%
Democratic	Hubert Humphrey	1,375,064	38.58%
Democratic	George Wallace	268,551	7.53%
Democratic	Shirley Chisholm	157,435	4.42%
Democratic	Edmund Muskie	72,701	2.04%
Democratic	Sam Yorty	50,745	1.42%
Democratic	Eugene McCarthy	34,203	0.96%
Democratic	Henry M. Jackson	28,901	0.81%
Democratic	John Lindsay	26,246	0.74%
Democratic	Others	20	0.00%
Total votes		3,564,518	100

=== Republican ===
Richard Nixon would easily win the California Republican Primary by a wide margin over his only state challenger.

Republican Primary – June 6, 1972
Party	Candidate	Votes	%
Republican	Richard Nixon (incumbent)	2,058,825	90.14%
Republican	John M. Ashbrook	224,922	9.85%
Republican	Others	175	0.01%
Total votes		2,283,922	100

== Results ==
1972 United States presidential election in California
Party	Candidate	Votes	Percentage	Electoral votes
Republican	Richard Nixon (incumbent)	4,602,096	55.00%	45
Democratic	George McGovern	3,475,847	41.54%	0
American Independent	John G. Schmitz	232,554	2.78%	0
Peace and Freedom	Benjamin Spock	55,167	0.66%	0
Libertarian	John Hospers (write-in)	980	0.01%	0
Socialist Workers	Linda Jenness (write-in)	574	0.01%	0
Communist	Gus Hall (write-in)	373	0.00%	0
Socialist Labor	Louis Fisher (write-in)	197	0.00%	0
Prohibition Party	E. Harold Munn (write-in)	53	0.00%	0
Universal Party	Gabriel Green (write-in)	21	0.00%	0
Invalid or blank votes				—
Totals		8,367,862	100.00%	45
Voter turnout				—

=== Results by county ===
County	Richard Nixon Republican		George McGovern Democratic		John G. Schmitz American Independent		Various candidates Other parties		Margin		Total votes cast
County	#	%	#	%	#	%	#	%	#	%	Total votes cast
Alameda	201,862	42.84%	259,254	55.02%	6,930	1.47%	3,149	0.67%	-57,392	-12.18%	471,195
Alpine	366	63.54%	195	33.85%	7	1.22%	8	1.39%	171	29.69%	576
Amador	3,533	53.40%	2,705	40.89%	340	5.14%	38	0.57%	828	12.51%	6,616
Butte	28,819	57.61%	18,401	36.78%	2,468	4.93%	340	0.68%	10,418	20.83%	50,028
Calaveras	4,119	60.76%	2,268	33.46%	304	4.48%	88	1.30%	1,851	27.30%	6,779
Colusa	2,715	57.56%	1,810	38.37%	167	3.54%	25	0.53%	905	19.19%	4,717
Contra Costa	139,044	54.13%	111,718	43.49%	4,701	1.83%	1,421	0.55%	27,326	10.64%	256,884
Del Norte	2,927	51.82%	2,156	38.17%	515	9.12%	50	0.89%	771	13.65%	5,648
El Dorado	11,330	54.20%	8,654	41.40%	794	3.80%	127	0.61%	2,676	12.80%	20,905
Fresno	79,051	50.44%	72,682	46.38%	3,927	2.51%	1,059	0.68%	6,369	4.06%	156,719
Glenn	4,569	59.01%	2,681	34.62%	458	5.92%	35	0.45%	1,888	24.39%	7,743
Humboldt	22,345	48.83%	21,132	46.18%	1,896	4.14%	390	0.85%	1,213	2.65%	45,763
Imperial	14,178	62.05%	7,982	34.93%	607	2.66%	82	0.36%	6,196	27.12%	22,849
Inyo	4,873	68.07%	2,006	28.02%	240	3.35%	40	0.56%	2,867	40.05%	7,159
Kern	71,686	60.14%	41,937	35.18%	5,112	4.29%	458	0.38%	29,479	24.96%	119,193
Kings	10,509	56.52%	7,274	39.12%	742	3.99%	70	0.38%	3,235	17.40%	18,595
Lake	6,477	55.12%	4,715	40.13%	509	4.33%	49	0.42%	1,762	14.99%	11,750
Lassen	3,618	50.80%	3,134	44.00%	320	4.49%	50	0.70%	484	6.80%	7,122
Los Angeles	1,549,717	54.75%	1,189,977	42.04%	71,978	2.54%	18,698	0.66%	359,740	12.71%	2,830,370
Madera	7,835	52.61%	6,580	44.18%	428	2.87%	49	0.33%	1,255	8.43%	14,892
Marin	54,123	52.10%	47,414	45.64%	1,326	1.28%	1,020	0.98%	6,709	6.46%	103,883
Mariposa	2,122	56.15%	1,487	39.35%	141	3.73%	29	0.77%	635	16.80%	3,779
Mendocino	11,128	51.01%	9,435	43.25%	1,050	4.81%	201	0.92%	1,693	7.76%	21,814
Merced	17,737	54.33%	13,914	42.62%	836	2.56%	161	0.49%	3,823	11.71%	32,648
Modoc	2,085	58.49%	1,271	35.65%	188	5.27%	21	0.59%	814	22.84%	3,565
Mono	1,872	66.88%	828	29.58%	78	2.79%	21	0.75%	1,044	37.30%	2,799
Monterey	47,004	57.04%	32,545	39.49%	2,274	2.76%	585	0.71%	14,459	17.55%	82,408
Napa	23,403	59.61%	14,529	37.01%	1,141	2.91%	188	0.48%	8,874	22.60%	39,261
Nevada	8,004	54.68%	5,693	38.89%	868	5.93%	73	0.50%	2,311	15.79%	14,638
Orange	448,291	68.27%	176,847	26.93%	28,634	4.36%	2,881	0.44%	271,444	41.34%	656,653
Placer	18,597	50.34%	16,911	45.77%	1,251	3.39%	186	0.50%	1,686	4.57%	36,945
Plumas	2,952	46.42%	3,057	48.07%	318	5.00%	33	0.52%	-105	-1.65%	6,360
Riverside	108,120	58.00%	71,591	38.41%	5,843	3.13%	850	0.46%	36,529	19.59%	186,404
Sacramento	141,218	49.00%	137,287	47.63%	7,841	2.72%	1,875	0.65%	3,931	1.37%	288,221
San Benito	3,961	57.56%	2,582	37.52%	308	4.48%	30	0.44%	1,379	20.04%	6,881
San Bernardino	144,689	59.73%	85,986	35.49%	10,342	4.27%	1,239	0.51%	58,703	24.24%	242,256
San Diego	371,627	61.82%	206,455	34.34%	20,188	3.36%	2,867	0.48%	165,172	27.48%	601,137
San Francisco	127,461	41.82%	170,882	56.07%	3,702	1.21%	2,725	0.89%	-43,421	-14.25%	304,770
San Joaquin	61,646	55.30%	44,062	39.53%	5,027	4.51%	734	0.66%	17,584	15.77%	111,469
San Luis Obispo	28,566	55.98%	20,779	40.72%	1,156	2.27%	532	1.04%	7,787	15.26%	51,033
San Mateo	135,377	52.82%	109,745	42.82%	4,079	1.59%	7,096	2.77%	25,632	10.00%	256,297
Santa Barbara	67,075	55.19%	50,609	41.64%	3,103	2.55%	754	0.62%	16,466	13.55%	121,541
Santa Clara	237,334	51.90%	208,506	45.60%	8,236	1.80%	3,217	0.70%	28,828	6.30%	457,293
Santa Cruz	34,799	49.88%	32,336	46.35%	1,931	2.77%	693	0.99%	2,463	3.53%	69,759
Shasta	16,618	46.68%	17,214	48.35%	1,595	4.48%	176	0.49%	-596	-1.67%	35,603
Sierra	629	47.51%	658	49.70%	27	2.04%	10	0.76%	-29	-2.19%	1,324
Siskiyou	7,563	51.46%	6,434	43.78%	621	4.23%	78	0.53%	1,129	7.68%	14,696
Solano	31,314	54.02%	24,766	42.73%	1,616	2.79%	269	0.46%	6,548	11.29%	57,965
Sonoma	57,697	54.72%	43,746	41.49%	3,192	3.03%	799	0.76%	13,951	13.23%	105,434
Stanislaus	39,521	51.41%	35,005	45.54%	1,943	2.53%	398	0.52%	4,516	5.87%	76,867
Sutter	10,224	62.45%	5,409	33.04%	647	3.95%	92	0.56%	4,815	29.41%	16,372
Tehama	6,054	48.73%	5,175	41.65%	1,161	9.34%	34	0.27%	879	7.08%	12,424
Trinity	1,868	50.75%	1,621	44.04%	169	4.59%	23	0.62%	247	6.71%	3,681
Tulare	36,048	59.93%	21,775	36.20%	2,076	3.45%	251	0.42%	14,273	23.73%	60,150
Tuolumne	5,894	54.29%	4,596	42.34%	299	2.75%	67	0.62%	1,298	11.95%	10,856
Ventura	95,310	63.20%	49,307	32.70%	5,586	3.70%	602	0.40%	46,003	30.50%	150,805
Yolo	17,969	42.04%	23,694	55.44%	800	1.87%	275	0.64%	-5,725	-13.40%	42,738
Yuba	6,623	56.95%	4,435	38.13%	518	4.45%	54	0.46%	2,188	18.82%	11,630
Total	4,602,096	55.00%	3,475,847	41.54%	232,554	2.78%	57,365	0.69%	1,126,249	13.46%	8,367,862

=== Results by city ===
Official outcome by city and unincorporated areas of counties, of which Nixon won 374 and McGovern won 90.
City	County	Richard Nixon Republican		George McGovern Democratic		John Schmitz American Independent		Benjamin Spock Peace and Freedom		Margin		Total Votes	1968 to 1972 Swing%
City	County	#	%	#	%	#	%	#	%	#	%	Total Votes	1968 to 1972 Swing%
Alameda	Alameda	14,180	57.68%	9,855	40.09%	403	1.64%	145	0.59%	4,325	17.59%	24,583	15.90%
Albany	Alameda	3,102	42.03%	4,088	55.39%	141	1.91%	50	0.68%	-986	-13.36%	7,381	2.27%
Berkeley	Alameda	12,323	19.16%	50,948	79.23%	341	0.53%	690	1.07%	-38,625	-60.07%	64,302	-15.68%
Emeryville	Alameda	460	35.17%	829	63.38%	11	0.84%	8	0.61%	-369	-28.21%	1,308	15.29%
Fremont	Alameda	21,709	54.02%	17,374	43.23%	916	2.28%	188	0.47%	4,335	10.79%	40,187	17.61%
Hayward	Alameda	16,068	47.57%	17,033	50.42%	556	1.65%	124	0.37%	-965	-2.86%	33,781	11.95%
Livermore	Alameda	11,256	62.09%	6,314	34.83%	477	2.63%	82	0.45%	4,942	27.26%	18,129	14.42%
Newark	Alameda	4,551	50.70%	4,181	46.57%	191	2.13%	54	0.60%	370	4.12%	8,977	24.14%
Oakland	Alameda	49,242	33.50%	95,152	64.73%	1,649	1.12%	960	0.65%	-45,910	-31.23%	147,003	-4.97%
Piedmont	Alameda	4,422	69.33%	1,834	28.76%	84	1.32%	38	0.60%	2,588	40.58%	6,378	-3.68%
Pleasanton	Alameda	8,178	67.84%	3,636	30.16%	197	1.63%	43	0.36%	4,542	37.68%	12,054	21.75%
San Leandro	Alameda	16,678	54.32%	13,274	43.23%	634	2.06%	119	0.39%	3,404	11.09%	30,705	20.73%
Union City	Alameda	3,259	44.20%	3,951	53.58%	144	1.95%	20	0.27%	-692	-9.38%	7,374	26.13%
Unincorporated Area	Alameda	27,461	52.81%	23,226	44.67%	1,025	1.97%	288	0.55%	4,235	8.14%	52,000	13.01%
Unapportioned Absentees	Alameda	8,973	53.46%	7,559	45.04%	161	0.96%	91	0.54%	1,414	8.42%	16,784	-1.75%
Unincorporated Area	Alpine	366	63.54%	195	33.85%	7	1.22%	8	1.39%	171	29.69%	576	3.21%
Amador City	Amador	28	41.18%	34	50.00%	5	7.35%	1	1.47%	-6	-8.82%	68	-5.60%
Ione	Amador	412	55.01%	285	38.05%	46	6.14%	6	0.80%	127	16.96%	749	13.89%
Jackson	Amador	582	54.96%	436	41.17%	35	3.31%	6	0.57%	146	13.79%	1,059	20.67%
Plymouth	Amador	91	51.41%	77	43.50%	8	4.52%	1	0.56%	14	7.91%	177	39.16%
Sutter Creek	Amador	470	53.29%	368	41.72%	37	4.20%	7	0.79%	102	11.56%	882	14.87%
Unincorporated Area	Amador	1,705	52.35%	1,340	41.14%	197	6.05%	15	0.46%	365	11.21%	3,257	12.88%
Unapportioned Absentees	Amador	245	57.92%	165	39.01%	12	2.84%	1	0.24%	80	18.91%	423	19.97%
Biggs	Butte	223	53.73%	164	39.52%	24	5.78%	4	0.96%	59	14.22%	415	11.06%
Chico	Butte	4,926	48.05%	4,931	48.10%	299	2.92%	96	0.94%	-5	-0.05%	10,252	-27.13%
Gridley	Butte	708	57.99%	429	35.14%	80	6.55%	4	0.33%	279	22.85%	1,221	11.81%
Oroville	Butte	1,945	60.86%	1,131	35.39%	110	3.44%	10	0.31%	814	25.47%	3,196	14.63%
Unincorporated Area	Butte	21,017	60.17%	11,746	33.63%	1,955	5.60%	213	0.61%	9,271	26.54%	34,931	1.80%
Angels	Calaveras	611	58.92%	370	35.68%	37	3.57%	19	1.83%	241	23.24%	1,037	16.51%
Unincorporated Area	Calaveras	3,062	60.30%	1,701	33.50%	247	4.86%	68	1.34%	1,361	26.80%	5,078	11.22%
Unapportioned Absentees	Calaveras	446	67.27%	197	29.71%	20	3.02%	0	0.00%	249	37.56%	663	4.22%
Colusa	Colusa	805	56.10%	583	40.63%	39	2.72%	8	0.56%	222	15.47%	1,435	7.35%
Williams	Colusa	322	55.61%	238	41.11%	16	2.76%	3	0.52%	84	14.51%	579	14.14%
Unincorporated Area	Colusa	1,378	57.30%	904	37.59%	109	4.53%	14	0.58%	474	19.71%	2,405	6.01%
Unapportioned Absentees	Colusa	210	70.47%	85	28.52%	3	1.01%	0	0.00%	125	41.95%	298	19.68%
Antioch	Contra Costa	5,311	45.43%	6,120	52.35%	199	1.70%	60	0.51%	-809	-6.92%	11,690	23.59%
Brentwood	Contra Costa	473	47.97%	478	48.48%	31	3.14%	4	0.41%	-5	-0.51%	986	12.80%
Clayton	Contra Costa	393	63.49%	210	33.93%	11	1.78%	5	0.81%	183	29.56%	619	13.21%
Concord	Contra Costa	21,071	56.98%	15,076	40.77%	656	1.77%	179	0.48%	5,995	16.21%	36,982	17.52%
El Cerrito	Contra Costa	6,012	48.42%	6,098	49.11%	252	2.03%	55	0.44%	-86	-0.69%	12,417	6.24%
Hercules	Contra Costa	48	55.17%	36	41.38%	3	3.45%	0	0.00%	12	13.79%	87	11.39%
Lafayette	Contra Costa	7,147	67.64%	3,165	29.95%	192	1.82%	63	0.60%	3,982	37.68%	10,567	2.53%
Martinez	Contra Costa	3,930	50.04%	3,703	47.15%	178	2.27%	42	0.53%	227	2.89%	7,853	16.05%
Pinole	Contra Costa	3,244	58.71%	2,056	37.21%	197	3.57%	28	0.51%	1,188	21.50%	5,525	25.47%
Pittsburg	Contra Costa	2,913	34.69%	5,329	63.46%	114	1.36%	42	0.50%	-2,416	-28.77%	8,398	22.66%
Pleasant Hill	Contra Costa	6,474	57.39%	4,550	40.34%	204	1.81%	52	0.46%	1,924	17.06%	11,280	9.19%
Richmond	Contra Costa	9,626	32.82%	19,043	64.93%	503	1.72%	155	0.53%	-9,417	-32.11%	29,327	5.62%
San Pablo	Contra Costa	2,736	42.04%	3,580	55.01%	152	2.34%	40	0.61%	-844	-12.97%	6,508	11.83%
Walnut Creek	Contra Costa	15,148	70.94%	5,830	27.30%	274	1.28%	100	0.47%	9,318	43.64%	21,352	10.40%
Unincorporated Area	Contra Costa	46,624	57.80%	31,901	39.55%	1,601	1.98%	533	0.66%	14,723	18.25%	80,659	11.04%
Unapportioned Absentees	Contra Costa	7,894	62.52%	4,543	35.98%	134	1.06%	56	0.44%	3,351	26.54%	12,627	-1.04%
Crescent City	Del Norte	492	52.23%	360	38.22%	81	8.60%	9	0.96%	132	14.01%	942	6.00%
Unincorporated Area	Del Norte	2,103	50.53%	1,602	38.49%	418	10.04%	39	0.94%	501	12.04%	4,162	11.73%
Unapportioned Absentees	Del Norte	332	61.03%	194	35.66%	16	2.94%	2	0.37%	138	25.37%	544	8.29%
Placerville	El Dorado	1,331	54.11%	1,031	41.91%	86	3.50%	12	0.49%	300	12.20%	2,460	0.75%
South Lake Tahoe	El Dorado	2,451	53.09%	2,014	43.62%	102	2.21%	50	1.08%	437	9.47%	4,617	-1.23%
Unincorporated Area	El Dorado	7,548	54.60%	5,609	40.57%	606	4.38%	62	0.45%	1,939	14.03%	13,825	8.46%
Clovis	Fresno	3,052	51.42%	2,699	45.47%	157	2.64%	28	0.47%	353	5.95%	5,936	13.23%
Coalinga	Fresno	1,168	52.57%	973	43.79%	74	3.33%	7	0.32%	195	8.78%	2,222	14.72%
Firebaugh	Fresno	185	27.61%	467	69.70%	16	2.39%	2	0.30%	-282	-42.09%	670	2.45%
Fowler	Fresno	351	50.21%	343	49.07%	4	0.57%	1	0.14%	8	1.14%	699	10.36%
Fresno	Fresno	30,285	46.01%	33,546	50.97%	1,408	2.14%	578	0.88%	-3,261	-4.95%	65,817	6.14%
Huron	Fresno	83	31.44%	177	67.05%	2	0.76%	2	0.76%	-94	-35.61%	264	20.22%
Kerman	Fresno	359	49.18%	355	48.63%	15	2.05%	1	0.14%	4	0.55%	730	9.61%
Kingsburg	Fresno	1,050	66.00%	491	30.86%	49	3.08%	1	0.06%	559	35.14%	1,591	12.30%
Mendota	Fresno	164	32.48%	334	66.14%	5	0.99%	2	0.40%	-170	-33.66%	505	11.04%
Orange Cove	Fresno	249	37.90%	393	59.82%	15	2.28%	0	0.00%	-144	-21.92%	657	5.83%
Parlier	Fresno	158	36.66%	263	61.02%	9	2.09%	1	0.23%	-105	-24.36%	431	8.97%
Reedley	Fresno	1,754	57.75%	1,139	37.50%	133	4.38%	11	0.36%	615	20.25%	3,037	1.14%
Sanger	Fresno	1,267	40.02%	1,846	58.31%	43	1.36%	10	0.32%	-579	-18.29%	3,166	4.12%
San Joaquin	Fresno	99	39.44%	136	54.18%	14	5.58%	2	0.80%	-37	-14.74%	251	-3.67%
Selma	Fresno	1,291	53.48%	1,050	43.50%	63	2.61%	10	0.41%	241	9.98%	2,414	15.65%
Unincorporated Area	Fresno	32,886	54.24%	25,610	42.24%	1,789	2.95%	341	0.56%	7,276	12.00%	60,626	7.93%
Unapportioned Absentees	Fresno	4,650	60.38%	2,860	37.14%	131	1.70%	60	0.78%	1,790	23.24%	7,701	5.46%
Orland	Glenn	789	60.65%	424	32.59%	82	6.30%	6	0.46%	365	28.06%	1,301	5.28%
Willows	Glenn	1,001	56.78%	691	39.19%	63	3.57%	8	0.45%	310	17.58%	1,763	9.05%
Unincorporated Area	Glenn	2,474	58.95%	1,399	33.33%	303	7.22%	21	0.50%	1,075	25.61%	4,197	3.08%
Unapportioned Absentees	Glenn	305	63.28%	167	34.65%	10	2.07%	0	0.00%	138	28.63%	482	3.43%
Arcata	Humboldt	1,943	35.50%	3,338	60.98%	147	2.69%	46	0.84%	-1,395	-25.48%	5,474	-18.39%
Blue Lake	Humboldt	178	35.32%	302	59.92%	18	3.57%	6	1.19%	-124	-24.60%	504	-3.54%
Eureka	Humboldt	5,522	50.73%	4,838	44.45%	431	3.96%	94	0.86%	684	6.28%	10,885	8.48%
Ferndale	Humboldt	393	59.28%	238	35.90%	25	3.77%	7	1.06%	155	23.38%	663	-0.05%
Fortuna	Humboldt	1,124	60.89%	636	34.45%	68	3.68%	18	0.98%	488	26.44%	1,846	11.54%
Rio Dell	Humboldt	421	46.16%	442	48.46%	40	4.39%	9	0.99%	-21	-2.30%	912	13.43%
Trinidad	Humboldt	107	51.20%	94	44.98%	6	2.87%	2	0.96%	13	6.22%	209	18.89%
Unincorporated Area	Humboldt	10,936	49.50%	9,907	44.84%	1,089	4.93%	163	0.74%	1,029	4.66%	22,095	4.54%
Unapportioned Absentees	Humboldt	1,721	54.55%	1,337	42.38%	72	2.28%	25	0.79%	384	12.17%	3,155	-6.20%
Brawley	Imperial	2,418	56.63%	1,768	41.41%	71	1.66%	13	0.30%	650	15.22%	4,270	4.69%
Calexico	Imperial	791	40.36%	1,126	57.45%	36	1.84%	7	0.36%	-335	-17.09%	1,960	-0.41%
Calipatria	Imperial	271	52.12%	232	44.62%	15	2.88%	2	0.38%	39	7.50%	520	12.50%
El Centro	Imperial	4,479	65.87%	2,126	31.26%	170	2.50%	25	0.37%	2,353	34.60%	6,800	12.58%
Holtville	Imperial	754	66.55%	325	28.68%	47	4.15%	7	0.62%	429	37.86%	1,133	19.90%
Imperial	Imperial	723	71.23%	250	24.63%	40	3.94%	2	0.20%	473	46.60%	1,015	28.96%
Westmorland	Imperial	157	47.43%	165	49.85%	8	2.42%	1	0.30%	-8	-2.42%	331	-3.04%
Unincorporated Area	Imperial	3,715	65.53%	1,734	30.59%	198	3.49%	22	0.39%	1,981	34.94%	5,669	13.30%
Unapportioned Absentees	Imperial	870	75.59%	256	22.24%	22	1.91%	3	0.26%	614	53.34%	1,151	12.19%
Bishop	Inyo	1,101	73.74%	319	21.37%	65	4.35%	8	0.54%	782	52.38%	1,493	26.65%
Unincorporated Area	Inyo	3,322	66.24%	1,505	30.01%	164	3.27%	24	0.48%	1,817	36.23%	5,015	20.03%
Unapportioned Absentees	Inyo	450	69.34%	182	28.04%	11	1.69%	6	0.92%	268	41.29%	649	6.67%
Arvin	Kern	567	47.29%	596	49.71%	30	2.50%	6	0.50%	-29	-2.42%	1,199	8.23%
Bakersfield	Kern	17,723	59.50%	10,807	36.28%	1,156	3.88%	99	0.33%	6,916	23.22%	29,785	14.78%
California City	Kern	519	65.45%	230	29.00%	38	4.79%	6	0.76%	289	36.44%	793	21.39%
Delano	Kern	2,467	55.80%	1,870	42.30%	65	1.47%	19	0.43%	597	13.50%	4,421	18.70%
Maricopa	Kern	112	50.68%	95	42.99%	13	5.88%	1	0.45%	17	7.69%	221	20.01%
McFarland	Kern	455	56.88%	327	40.88%	18	2.25%	0	0.00%	128	16.00%	800	9.36%
Ridgecrest	Kern	2,540	70.65%	798	22.20%	239	6.65%	18	0.50%	1,742	48.46%	3,595	34.49%
Shafter	Kern	1,206	66.12%	537	29.44%	78	4.28%	3	0.16%	669	36.68%	1,824	8.32%
Taft	Kern	1,173	64.27%	587	32.16%	63	3.45%	2	0.11%	586	32.11%	1,825	18.34%
Tehachapi	Kern	963	62.82%	470	30.66%	86	5.61%	14	0.91%	493	32.16%	1,533	24.62%
Wasco	Kern	1,191	54.73%	924	42.46%	59	2.71%	2	0.09%	267	12.27%	2,176	11.79%
Unincorporated Area	Kern	38,344	59.41%	22,894	35.47%	3,068	4.75%	238	0.37%	15,450	23.94%	64,544	18.54%
Unapportioned Absentees	Kern	4,426	68.55%	1,802	27.91%	199	3.08%	30	0.46%	2,624	40.64%	6,457	62.72%
Corcoran	Kings	628	47.22%	657	49.40%	42	3.16%	3	0.23%	-29	-2.18%	1,330	1.46%
Hanford	Kings	2,897	55.88%	2,073	39.99%	195	3.76%	19	0.37%	824	15.90%	5,184	19.60%
Lemoore	Kings	930	62.63%	497	33.47%	48	3.23%	10	0.67%	433	29.16%	1,485	36.03%
Unincorporated Area	Kings	5,304	55.56%	3,769	39.48%	440	4.61%	34	0.36%	1,535	16.08%	9,547	24.16%
Unapportioned Absentees	Kings	750	71.50%	278	26.50%	17	1.62%	4	0.38%	472	45.00%	1,049	20.37%
Lakeport	Lake	772	57.02%	504	37.22%	75	5.54%	3	0.22%	268	19.79%	1,354	3.15%
Unincorporated Area	Lake	5,081	53.69%	3,941	41.65%	402	4.25%	39	0.41%	1,140	12.05%	9,463	8.33%
Unapportioned Absentees	Lake	624	66.95%	270	28.97%	32	3.43%	6	0.64%	354	37.98%	932	7.61%
Susanville	Lassen	1,283	45.81%	1,355	48.38%	143	5.11%	20	0.71%	-72	-2.57%	2,801	9.34%
Unincorporated Area	Lassen	2,020	53.45%	1,559	41.25%	172	4.55%	28	0.74%	461	12.20%	3,779	15.96%
Unapportioned Absentees	Lassen	315	58.23%	220	40.67%	5	0.92%	1	0.18%	95	17.56%	541	4.97%
Alhambra	Los Angeles (Note: The sum of Nixon’s votes across Los Angeles County municipalities is 23 fewer than the official county-wide tally.) (Note: The sum of McGovern’s votes across Los Angeles County municipalities is 24 fewer than the official county-wide tally.) (Note: The sum of Schmitz’s votes across Los Angeles County municipalities is 1 fewer than the official county-wide tally.)	18,237	62.67%	9,874	33.93%	826	2.84%	165	0.57%	8,363	28.74%	29,102	8.80%
Arcadia	Los Angeles	19,107	77.90%	4,526	18.45%	807	3.29%	89	0.36%	14,581	59.44%	24,529	6.17%
Artesia	Los Angeles	2,437	60.94%	1,394	34.86%	141	3.53%	27	0.68%	1,043	26.08%	3,999	13.31%
Avalon	Los Angeles	633	69.10%	258	28.17%	18	1.97%	7	0.76%	375	40.94%	916	30.94%
Azusa	Los Angeles	4,498	55.67%	3,219	39.84%	315	3.90%	48	0.59%	1,279	15.83%	8,080	15.89%
Baldwin Park	Los Angeles	6,332	54.01%	4,864	41.49%	449	3.83%	78	0.67%	1,468	12.52%	11,723	21.86%
Bell	Los Angeles	3,753	57.93%	2,394	36.95%	297	4.58%	35	0.54%	1,359	20.98%	6,479	19.62%
Bellflower	Los Angeles	12,183	62.60%	6,462	33.20%	712	3.66%	105	0.54%	5,721	29.40%	19,462	18.96%
Bell Gardens	Los Angeles	3,180	52.68%	2,541	42.09%	287	4.75%	29	0.48%	639	10.58%	6,037	24.56%
Beverly Hills	Los Angeles	9,135	49.07%	9,199	49.41%	124	0.67%	158	0.85%	-64	-0.34%	18,616	24.22%
Bradbury	Los Angeles	293	80.27%	64	17.53%	6	1.64%	2	0.55%	229	62.74%	365	6.99%
Burbank	Los Angeles	27,358	66.90%	11,928	29.17%	1,441	3.52%	164	0.40%	15,430	37.73%	40,891	15.45%
Carson	Los Angeles	9,890	45.35%	11,236	51.53%	507	2.33%	173	0.79%	-1,346	-6.17%	21,806	12.36%
Cerritos	Los Angeles	9,838	69.51%	3,841	27.14%	403	2.85%	71	0.50%	5,997	42.37%	14,153	9.92%
Claremont	Los Angeles	6,757	58.18%	4,593	39.55%	213	1.83%	50	0.43%	2,164	18.63%	11,613	-8.08%
Commerce	Los Angeles	930	34.92%	1,656	62.19%	60	2.25%	17	0.64%	-726	-27.26%	2,663	23.15%
Compton	Los Angeles	2,306	11.12%	18,142	87.47%	140	0.67%	153	0.74%	-15,836	-76.35%	20,741	-9.62%
Covina	Los Angeles	9,549	68.99%	3,740	27.02%	504	3.64%	48	0.35%	5,809	41.97%	13,841	11.12%
Cudahy	Los Angeles	1,602	51.18%	1,356	43.32%	145	4.63%	27	0.86%	246	7.86%	3,130	16.80%
Culver City	Los Angeles	9,215	56.51%	6,676	40.94%	336	2.06%	81	0.50%	2,539	15.57%	16,308	14.24%
Downey	Los Angeles	26,121	68.55%	10,315	27.07%	1,443	3.79%	224	0.59%	15,806	41.48%	38,103	17.07%
Duarte	Los Angeles	3,174	64.13%	1,551	31.34%	192	3.88%	32	0.65%	1,623	32.79%	4,949	14.27%
El Monte	Los Angeles	10,836	57.40%	7,166	37.96%	759	4.02%	116	0.61%	3,670	19.44%	18,877	22.23%
El Segundo	Los Angeles	4,763	70.22%	1,738	25.62%	237	3.49%	45	0.66%	3,025	44.60%	6,783	16.47%
Gardena	Los Angeles	8,856	56.93%	6,253	40.19%	351	2.26%	97	0.62%	2,603	16.73%	15,557	10.27%
Glendale	Los Angeles	43,975	72.76%	13,857	22.93%	2,350	3.89%	257	0.43%	30,118	49.83%	60,439	6.96%
Glendora	Los Angeles	10,218	72.50%	3,311	23.49%	521	3.70%	44	0.31%	6,907	49.01%	14,094	10.72%
Hawaiian Gardens	Los Angeles	903	46.14%	974	49.77%	67	3.42%	13	0.66%	-71	-3.63%	1,957	24.67%
Hawthorne	Los Angeles	12,808	63.23%	6,715	33.15%	642	3.17%	92	0.45%	6,093	30.08%	20,257	20.07%
Hermosa Beach	Los Angeles	4,777	50.80%	4,330	46.05%	195	2.07%	101	1.07%	447	4.75%	9,403	-18.34%
Hidden Hills	Los Angeles	556	73.74%	186	24.67%	6	0.80%	6	0.80%	370	49.07%	754	-5.58%
Huntington Park	Los Angeles	5,417	57.74%	3,491	37.21%	401	4.27%	72	0.77%	1,926	20.53%	9,381	14.85%
Industry	Los Angeles	62	62.63%	35	35.35%	1	1.01%	1	1.01%	27	27.27%	99	16.16%
Inglewood	Los Angeles	17,852	53.78%	14,524	43.75%	704	2.12%	117	0.35%	3,328	10.03%	33,197	-5.33%
Irwindale	Los Angeles	96	30.28%	215	67.82%	3	0.95%	3	0.95%	-119	-37.54%	317	12.88%
Lakewood	Los Angeles	21,850	61.57%	12,220	34.44%	1,159	3.27%	258	0.73%	9,630	27.14%	35,487	20.57%
La Mirada	Los Angeles	8,885	69.04%	3,557	27.64%	364	2.83%	63	0.49%	5,328	41.40%	12,869	16.52%
La Puente	Los Angeles	3,916	47.20%	4,002	48.24%	309	3.72%	69	0.83%	-86	-1.04%	8,296	19.80%
La Verne	Los Angeles	4,069	64.63%	2,032	32.27%	174	2.76%	21	0.33%	2,037	32.35%	6,296	9.95%
Lawndale	Los Angeles	3,885	57.08%	2,589	38.04%	263	3.86%	69	1.01%	1,296	19.04%	6,806	24.00%
Lomita	Los Angeles	4,325	60.51%	2,505	35.04%	273	3.82%	45	0.63%	1,820	25.46%	7,148	21.84%
Long Beach	Los Angeles	89,746	58.70%	57,919	37.88%	4,086	2.67%	1,148	0.75%	31,827	20.82%	152,899	7.03%
Los Angeles	Los Angeles	496,896	46.29%	549,176	51.16%	19,967	1.86%	7,375	0.69%	-52,280	-4.87%	1,073,414	10.90%
Lynwood	Los Angeles	7,842	58.79%	4,874	36.54%	533	4.00%	91	0.68%	2,968	22.25%	13,340	13.41%
Manhattan Beach	Los Angeles	11,160	61.72%	6,424	35.53%	384	2.12%	113	0.62%	4,736	26.19%	18,081	-3.22%
Maywood	Los Angeles	2,282	56.04%	1,605	39.42%	161	3.95%	24	0.59%	677	16.63%	4,072	23.86%
Monrovia	Los Angeles	7,633	64.29%	3,872	32.61%	330	2.78%	37	0.31%	3,761	31.68%	11,872	4.85%
Montebello	Los Angeles	8,461	49.23%	8,272	48.13%	345	2.01%	110	0.64%	189	1.10%	17,188	15.42%
Monterey Park	Los Angeles	10,739	54.65%	8,372	42.61%	453	2.31%	85	0.43%	2,367	12.05%	19,649	17.77%
Norwalk	Los Angeles	15,259	56.12%	10,701	39.36%	1,085	3.99%	145	0.53%	4,558	16.76%	27,190	25.22%
Palmdale	Los Angeles	2,867	70.90%	935	23.12%	233	5.76%	9	0.22%	1,932	47.77%	4,044	26.50%
Palos Verdes Estates	Los Angeles	5,531	77.18%	1,460	20.37%	140	1.95%	35	0.49%	4,071	56.81%	7,166	-0.84%
Paramount	Los Angeles	4,937	54.91%	3,656	40.66%	325	3.61%	73	0.81%	1,281	14.25%	8,991	18.87%
Pasadena	Los Angeles	28,119	58.71%	18,355	38.32%	1,119	2.34%	303	0.63%	9,764	20.39%	47,896	-2.45%
Pico Rivera	Los Angeles	7,925	44.92%	9,190	52.09%	430	2.44%	96	0.54%	-1,265	-7.17%	17,641	16.78%
Pomona	Los Angeles	16,099	55.47%	11,919	41.06%	887	3.06%	120	0.41%	4,180	14.40%	29,025	4.16%
Redondo Beach	Los Angeles	14,361	60.71%	8,441	35.68%	676	2.86%	177	0.75%	5,920	25.03%	23,655	12.31%
Rolling Hills	Los Angeles	846	81.98%	151	14.63%	30	2.91%	5	0.48%	695	67.34%	1,032	1.83%
Rolling Hills Estates	Los Angeles	2,755	77.56%	696	19.59%	81	2.28%	20	0.56%	2,059	57.97%	3,552	2.40%
Rosemead	Los Angeles	7,003	54.72%	5,255	41.06%	483	3.77%	58	0.45%	1,748	13.66%	12,799	18.51%
San Dimas	Los Angeles	3,974	65.52%	1,874	30.90%	197	3.25%	20	0.33%	2,100	34.62%	6,065	15.36%
San Fernando	Los Angeles	2,877	55.51%	2,079	40.11%	198	3.82%	29	0.56%	798	15.40%	5,183	17.42%
San Gabriel	Los Angeles	8,468	64.86%	4,091	31.34%	450	3.45%	46	0.35%	4,377	33.53%	13,055	11.39%
San Marino	Los Angeles	6,563	84.15%	946	12.13%	264	3.39%	26	0.33%	5,617	72.02%	7,799	-4.32%
Santa Fe Springs	Los Angeles	2,309	48.87%	2,221	47.01%	159	3.37%	36	0.76%	88	1.86%	4,725	25.04%
Santa Monica	Los Angeles	23,280	53.46%	18,981	43.59%	892	2.05%	393	0.90%	4,299	9.87%	43,546	-3.19%
Sierra Madre	Los Angeles	4,061	65.95%	1,845	29.96%	211	3.43%	41	0.67%	2,216	35.99%	6,158	-5.23%
Signal Hill	Los Angeles	1,073	53.38%	867	43.13%	58	2.89%	12	0.60%	206	10.25%	2,010	2.48%
South El Monte	Los Angeles	1,711	47.36%	1,759	48.69%	121	3.35%	22	0.61%	-48	-1.33%	3,613	26.73%
South Gate	Los Angeles	13,014	61.59%	7,158	33.88%	848	4.01%	109	0.52%	5,856	27.72%	21,129	20.39%
South Pasadena	Los Angeles	8,071	68.34%	3,270	27.69%	391	3.31%	78	0.66%	4,801	40.65%	11,810	-3.56%
Temple City	Los Angeles	9,990	69.41%	3,741	25.99%	602	4.18%	60	0.42%	6,249	43.42%	14,393	14.20%
Torrance	Los Angeles	42,811	69.08%	17,020	27.46%	1,821	2.94%	321	0.52%	25,791	41.62%	61,973	18.20%
Vernon	Los Angeles	23	82.14%	5	17.86%	0	0.00%	0	0.00%	18	64.29%	28	N/A
Walnut	Los Angeles	1,637	71.27%	588	25.60%	64	2.79%	8	0.35%	1,049	45.67%	2,297	8.94%
West Covina	Los Angeles	19,102	66.53%	8,450	29.43%	1,020	3.55%	138	0.48%	10,652	37.10%	28,710	13.20%
Whittier	Los Angeles	24,709	71.40%	8,610	24.88%	1,131	3.27%	157	0.45%	16,099	46.52%	34,607	3.93%
Unincorporated Area	Los Angeles	280,983	58.11%	185,646	38.39%	13,658	2.82%	3,256	0.67%	95,337	19.72%	483,543	17.47%
Chowchilla	Madera	655	50.85%	599	46.51%	32	2.48%	2	0.16%	56	4.35%	1,288	15.78%
Madera	Madera	2,554	47.57%	2,700	50.29%	100	1.86%	15	0.28%	-146	-2.72%	5,369	15.13%
Unincorporated Area	Madera	4,037	54.86%	3,012	40.93%	283	3.85%	27	0.37%	1,025	13.93%	7,359	10.55%
Unapportioned Absentees	Madera	589	67.31%	269	30.74%	13	1.49%	4	0.46%	320	36.57%	875	11.60%
Belvedere	Marin	911	64.61%	475	33.69%	11	0.78%	13	0.92%	436	30.92%	1,410	-2.52%
Corte Madera	Marin	2,336	54.05%	1,882	43.54%	70	1.62%	34	0.79%	454	10.50%	4,322	1.52%
Fairfax	Marin	1,362	35.48%	2,375	61.87%	55	1.43%	47	1.22%	-1,013	-26.39%	3,839	-18.43%
Larkspur	Marin	3,060	57.21%	2,158	40.34%	80	1.50%	51	0.95%	902	16.86%	5,349	5.55%
Mill Valley	Marin	2,719	40.28%	3,903	57.82%	51	0.76%	77	1.14%	-1,184	-17.54%	6,750	-11.76%
Novato	Marin	7,315	63.75%	3,920	34.16%	171	1.49%	69	0.60%	3,395	29.59%	11,475	23.66%
Ross	Marin	809	59.18%	523	38.26%	18	1.32%	17	1.24%	286	20.92%	1,367	-6.51%
San Anselmo	Marin	2,937	43.41%	3,625	53.58%	121	1.79%	83	1.23%	-688	-10.17%	6,766	-7.69%
San Rafael	Marin	10,123	57.77%	7,054	40.25%	213	1.22%	134	0.76%	3,069	17.51%	17,524	7.60%
Sausalito	Marin	1,600	39.63%	2,357	58.38%	21	0.52%	59	1.46%	-757	-18.75%	4,037	-8.62%
Tiburon	Marin	1,840	58.80%	1,248	39.88%	26	0.83%	15	0.48%	592	18.92%	3,129	9.03%
Unincorporated Area	Marin	15,296	48.97%	15,174	48.58%	436	1.40%	328	1.05%	122	0.39%	31,234	-7.89%
Unapportioned Absentees	Marin	3,815	84.32%	2,720	14.99%	53	0.29%	71	0.39%	12,576	69.33%	18,140	N/A
Unincorporated Area	Mariposa	2,122	56.17%	1,487	39.36%	141	3.73%	28	0.74%	635	16.81%	3,778	6.46%
Fort Bragg	Mendocino	801	46.17%	867	49.97%	49	2.82%	18	1.04%	-66	-3.80%	1,735	13.15%
Point Arena	Mendocino	127	71.35%	46	25.84%	4	2.25%	1	0.56%	81	45.51%	178	-8.23%
Ukiah	Mendocino	2,388	57.79%	1,522	36.83%	207	5.01%	15	0.36%	866	20.96%	4,132	21.06%
Willits	Mendocino	558	52.69%	434	40.98%	59	5.57%	8	0.76%	124	11.71%	1,059	10.13%
Unincorporated Area	Mendocino	6,398	48.70%	5,910	44.99%	687	5.23%	142	1.08%	488	3.71%	13,137	0.08%
Unapportioned Absentees	Mendocino	856	54.70%	656	41.92%	44	2.81%	9	0.58%	200	12.78%	1,565	-5.38%
Atwater	Merced	1,537	61.02%	893	35.45%	76	3.02%	13	0.52%	644	25.57%	2,519	34.82%
Dos Palos	Merced	506	55.36%	376	41.14%	24	2.63%	8	0.88%	130	14.22%	914	14.34%
Gustine	Merced	565	45.56%	645	52.02%	23	1.85%	7	0.56%	-80	-6.45%	1,240	31.48%
Livingston	Merced	345	47.07%	374	51.02%	12	1.64%	2	0.27%	-29	-3.96%	733	10.94%
Los Banos	Merced	1,439	44.29%	1,706	52.51%	89	2.74%	15	0.46%	-267	-8.22%	3,249	12.33%
Merced	Merced	4,494	54.61%	3,519	42.76%	177	2.15%	39	0.47%	975	11.85%	8,229	25.24%
Unincorporated Area	Merced	7,657	55.05%	5,775	41.52%	407	2.93%	71	0.51%	1,882	13.53%	13,910	21.11%
Unapportioned Absentees	Merced	1,194	64.44%	626	33.78%	28	1.51%	5	0.27%	568	30.65%	1,853	16.01%
Alturas	Modoc	609	50.50%	541	44.86%	47	3.90%	9	0.75%	68	5.64%	1,206	15.19%
Unincorporated Area	Modoc	1,259	62.33%	616	30.50%	136	6.73%	9	0.45%	643	31.83%	2,020	6.07%
Unapportioned Absentees	Modoc	217	64.01%	114	33.63%	5	1.47%	3	0.88%	103	30.38%	339	11.41%
Unincorporated Area	Mono	1,872	66.93%	828	29.60%	78	2.79%	19	0.68%	1,044	37.33%	2,797	-0.65%
Carmel-by-the-Sea	Monterey (Note: The sum of Nixon’s votes across Monterey County municipalities is 165 fewer than the official county-wide tally.) (Note: The sum of McGovern’s votes across Monterey County municipalities is 133 fewer than the official county-wide tally.) (Note: The sum of Schmitz’s votes across Monterey County municipalities is 5 fewer than the official county-wide tally.) (Note: The sum of Spock’s votes across Monterey County municipalities is 5 fewer than the official county-wide tally.)	1,537	55.63%	1,141	41.30%	59	2.14%	26	0.94%	396	14.33%	2,763	-10.81%
Del Rey Oaks	Monterey	492	60.67%	286	35.27%	27	3.33%	6	0.74%	206	25.40%	811	8.78%
Gonzales	Monterey	374	52.09%	333	46.38%	9	1.25%	2	0.28%	41	5.71%	718	21.42%
Greenfield	Monterey	421	63.69%	213	32.22%	27	4.08%	0	0.00%	208	31.47%	661	21.39%
King City	Monterey	840	78.07%	211	19.61%	22	2.04%	3	0.28%	629	58.46%	1,076	28.60%
Monterey	Monterey	4,755	50.97%	4,297	46.06%	201	2.15%	76	0.81%	458	4.91%	9,329	4.00%
Pacific Grove	Monterey	3,332	50.75%	3,028	46.12%	155	2.36%	51	0.78%	304	4.63%	6,566	-10.49%
Salinas	Monterey	12,690	58.58%	8,097	37.38%	749	3.46%	128	0.59%	4,593	21.20%	21,664	20.75%
Sand City	Monterey	50	54.35%	38	41.30%	3	3.26%	1	1.09%	12	13.04%	92	16.94%
Seaside	Monterey	2,608	42.39%	3,373	54.82%	139	2.26%	33	0.54%	-765	-12.43%	6,153	19.37%
Soledad	Monterey	463	47.24%	503	51.33%	10	1.02%	4	0.41%	-40	-4.08%	980	22.63%
Unincorporated Area	Monterey	19,277	61.67%	10,892	34.84%	868	2.78%	223	0.71%	8,385	26.82%	31,260	9.57%
Calistoga	Napa	587	58.82%	365	36.57%	40	4.01%	6	0.60%	222	22.24%	998	20.51%
Napa	Napa	10,889	57.18%	7,565	39.73%	518	2.72%	70	0.37%	3,324	17.46%	19,042	29.29%
St. Helena	Napa	1,087	63.09%	558	32.39%	67	3.89%	11	0.64%	529	30.70%	1,723	13.98%
Yountville	Napa	559	50.54%	521	47.11%	20	1.81%	6	0.54%	38	3.44%	1,106	35.70%
Unincorporated Area	Napa	8,866	61.95%	4,889	34.16%	466	3.26%	91	0.64%	3,977	27.79%	14,312	19.61%
Unapportioned Absentees	Napa	1,415	68.03%	631	30.34%	30	1.44%	4	0.19%	784	37.69%	2,080	N/A
Grass Valley	Nevada	1,234	53.28%	944	40.76%	127	5.48%	11	0.47%	290	12.52%	2,316	10.13%
Nevada City	Nevada	589	48.76%	557	46.11%	57	4.72%	5	0.41%	32	2.65%	1,208	-5.17%
Unincorporated Area	Nevada	5,429	54.90%	3,766	38.08%	644	6.51%	50	0.51%	1,663	16.82%	9,889	3.70%
Unapportioned Absentees	Nevada	752	61.39%	426	34.78%	40	3.27%	7	0.57%	326	26.61%	1,225	-7.61%
Anaheim	Orange	46,397	66.06%	20,029	28.52%	3,534	5.03%	272	0.39%	26,368	37.54%	70,232	8.41%
Brea	Orange	6,695	72.71%	2,155	23.40%	334	3.63%	24	0.26%	4,540	49.30%	9,208	9.59%
Buena Park	Orange	14,597	65.10%	6,763	30.16%	992	4.42%	70	0.31%	7,834	34.94%	22,422	19.79%
Costa Mesa	Orange	20,516	66.09%	9,084	29.26%	1,272	4.10%	170	0.55%	11,432	36.83%	31,042	0.39%
Cypress	Orange	9,295	67.57%	3,938	28.63%	475	3.45%	49	0.36%	5,357	38.94%	13,757	17.97%
Fountain Valley	Orange	12,941	72.34%	4,199	23.47%	690	3.86%	59	0.33%	8,742	48.87%	17,889	15.58%
Fullerton	Orange	27,086	68.32%	11,142	28.11%	1,262	3.18%	154	0.39%	15,944	40.22%	39,644	3.32%
Garden Grove	Orange	29,325	65.78%	12,470	27.97%	2,604	5.84%	180	0.40%	16,855	37.81%	44,579	15.28%
Huntington Beach	Orange	37,483	68.25%	15,142	27.57%	2,042	3.72%	256	0.47%	22,341	40.68%	54,923	10.43%
Irvine	Orange	6,733	68.18%	2,832	28.68%	268	2.71%	43	0.44%	3,901	39.50%	9,876	N/A
Laguna Beach	Orange	4,910	55.69%	3,633	41.21%	197	2.23%	76	0.86%	1,277	14.49%	8,816	-25.76%
La Habra	Orange	11,897	68.76%	4,682	27.06%	663	3.83%	60	0.35%	7,215	41.70%	17,302	9.35%
La Palma	Orange	3,561	72.23%	1,160	23.53%	191	3.87%	18	0.37%	2,401	48.70%	4,930	13.92%
Los Alamitos	Orange	2,650	63.61%	1,378	33.08%	124	2.98%	14	0.34%	1,272	30.53%	4,166	12.58%
Newport Beach	Orange	21,908	72.47%	7,297	24.14%	883	2.92%	143	0.47%	14,611	48.33%	30,231	-8.80%
Orange	Orange	22,731	70.29%	7,543	23.33%	1,920	5.94%	143	0.44%	15,188	46.97%	32,337	5.25%
Placentia	Orange	7,261	69.19%	2,778	26.47%	422	4.02%	33	0.31%	4,483	42.72%	10,494	11.10%
San Clemente	Orange	6,076	72.60%	1,912	22.85%	349	4.17%	32	0.38%	4,164	49.76%	8,369	2.47%
San Juan Capistrano	Orange	2,533	73.51%	728	21.13%	168	4.88%	17	0.49%	1,805	52.38%	3,446	16.53%
Santa Ana	Orange	33,127	62.56%	16,503	31.16%	3,062	5.78%	262	0.49%	16,624	31.39%	52,954	9.64%
Seal Beach	Orange	10,825	67.87%	4,751	29.79%	312	1.96%	62	0.39%	6,074	38.08%	15,950	4.81%
Stanton	Orange	5,060	63.77%	2,502	31.53%	348	4.39%	25	0.32%	2,558	32.24%	7,935	17.56%
Tustin	Orange	7,367	71.56%	2,406	23.37%	481	4.67%	41	0.40%	4,961	48.19%	10,295	-0.24%
Villa Park	Orange	1,476	81.10%	245	13.46%	91	5.00%	8	0.44%	1,231	67.64%	1,820	-0.31%
Westminster	Orange	15,012	65.76%	6,416	28.10%	1,301	5.70%	100	0.44%	8,596	37.65%	22,829	19.81%
Yorba Linda	Orange	6,127	76.56%	1,490	18.62%	357	4.46%	29	0.36%	4,637	57.94%	8,003	1.19%
Unincorporated Area	Orange	58,211	71.76%	18,894	23.29%	3,689	4.55%	320	0.39%	39,317	48.47%	81,114	5.28%
Unapportioned Absentees	Orange	16,491	75.10%	4,775	21.75%	603	2.75%	89	0.41%	11,716	53.36%	21,958	2.72%
Auburn	Placer	1,719	54.06%	1,348	42.39%	91	2.86%	22	0.69%	371	11.67%	3,180	5.73%
Colfax	Placer	176	47.83%	188	51.09%	4	1.09%	0	0.00%	-12	-3.26%	368	10.47%
Lincoln	Placer	509	48.16%	517	48.91%	26	2.46%	5	0.47%	-8	-0.76%	1,057	15.49%
Rocklin	Placer	520	43.01%	653	54.01%	33	2.73%	3	0.25%	-133	-11.00%	1,209	6.87%
Roseville	Placer	3,509	43.84%	4,239	52.96%	225	2.81%	31	0.39%	-730	-9.12%	8,004	18.47%
Unincorporated Area	Placer	10,655	51.95%	8,931	43.55%	819	3.99%	104	0.51%	1,724	8.41%	20,509	6.94%
Unapportioned Absentees	Placer	1,509	57.77%	1,035	39.62%	53	2.03%	15	0.57%	474	18.15%	2,612	7.14%
Portola	Plumas	232	34.68%	405	60.54%	28	4.19%	4	0.60%	-173	-25.86%	669	24.66%
Unincorporated Area	Plumas	2,340	47.43%	2,298	46.57%	277	5.61%	19	0.39%	42	0.85%	4,934	11.89%
Unapportioned Absentees	Plumas	380	50.60%	354	47.14%	13	1.73%	4	0.53%	26	3.46%	751	11.15%
Banning	Riverside	2,099	51.72%	1,762	43.42%	179	4.41%	18	0.44%	337	8.30%	4,058	-0.37%
Beaumont	Riverside	1,095	53.49%	816	39.86%	126	6.16%	10	0.49%	279	13.63%	2,047	3.28%
Blythe	Riverside	1,060	59.18%	690	38.53%	37	2.07%	4	0.22%	370	20.66%	1,791	21.47%
Coachella	Riverside	503	35.60%	879	62.21%	17	1.20%	14	0.99%	-376	-26.61%	1,413	16.84%
Corona	Riverside	5,598	57.40%	3,826	39.23%	300	3.08%	29	0.30%	1,772	18.17%	9,753	9.42%
Desert Hot Springs	Riverside	805	55.56%	598	41.27%	38	2.62%	8	0.55%	207	14.29%	1,449	15.76%
Elsinore	Riverside	634	40.51%	869	55.53%	54	3.45%	8	0.51%	-235	-15.02%	1,565	13.92%
Hemet	Riverside	5,660	67.75%	2,325	27.83%	347	4.15%	22	0.26%	3,335	39.92%	8,354	9.58%
Indian Wells	Riverside	327	87.67%	42	11.26%	2	0.54%	2	0.54%	285	76.41%	373	9.63%
Indio	Riverside	1,985	53.10%	1,634	43.71%	107	2.86%	12	0.32%	351	9.39%	3,738	7.13%
Norco	Riverside	2,454	61.01%	1,335	33.19%	223	5.54%	10	0.25%	1,119	27.82%	4,022	20.95%
Palm Springs	Riverside	6,182	62.34%	3,512	35.41%	171	1.72%	52	0.52%	2,670	26.92%	9,917	9.28%
Perris	Riverside	810	47.93%	821	48.58%	44	2.60%	15	0.89%	-11	-0.65%	1,690	12.99%
Riverside	Riverside	31,300	54.66%	24,400	42.61%	1,289	2.25%	275	0.48%	6,900	12.05%	57,264	-2.68%
San Jacinto	Riverside	989	56.00%	685	38.79%	84	4.76%	8	0.45%	304	17.21%	1,766	4.19%
Unincorporated Area	Riverside	37,899	59.28%	23,217	36.31%	2,557	4.00%	262	0.41%	14,682	22.96%	63,935	8.03%
Unapportioned Absentees	Riverside	8,720	65.87%	4,180	31.58%	268	2.02%	70	0.53%	4,540	34.30%	13,238	1.46%
Folsom	Sacramento	1,627	54.32%	1,241	41.44%	108	3.61%	19	0.63%	386	12.89%	2,995	15.87%
Galt	Sacramento	636	55.16%	455	39.46%	61	5.29%	1	0.09%	181	15.70%	1,153	12.70%
Isleton	Sacramento	140	46.05%	158	51.97%	5	1.64%	1	0.33%	-18	-5.92%	304	19.35%
Sacramento	Sacramento	51,220	42.98%	64,467	54.10%	2,668	2.24%	809	0.68%	-13,247	-11.12%	119,164	9.61%
Unincorporated Area	Sacramento	87,595	53.23%	70,966	43.13%	4,999	3.04%	990	0.60%	16,629	10.11%	164,550	12.36%
Hollister	San Benito	1,550	54.81%	1,137	40.21%	123	4.35%	18	0.64%	413	14.60%	2,828	20.39%
San Juan Bautista	San Benito	197	45.71%	223	51.74%	11	2.55%	0	0.00%	-26	-6.03%	431	19.62%
Unincorporated Area	San Benito	1,912	60.95%	1,053	33.57%	162	5.16%	10	0.32%	859	27.38%	3,137	17.87%
Unapportioned Absentees	San Benito	302	62.27%	169	34.85%	12	2.47%	2	0.41%	133	27.42%	485	-3.54%
Adelanto	San Bernardino	245	62.34%	121	30.79%	21	5.34%	6	1.53%	124	31.55%	393	N/A
Barstow	San Bernardino	3,229	58.30%	1,974	35.64%	305	5.51%	31	0.56%	1,255	22.66%	5,539	25.89%
Chino	San Bernardino	3,164	63.38%	1,636	32.77%	176	3.53%	16	0.32%	1,528	30.61%	4,992	18.43%
Colton	San Bernardino	2,447	38.15%	3,710	57.84%	224	3.49%	33	0.51%	-1,263	-19.69%	6,414	13.07%
Fontana	San Bernardino	3,617	49.32%	3,366	45.90%	301	4.10%	49	0.67%	251	3.42%	7,333	14.36%
Loma Linda	San Bernardino	2,649	83.09%	469	14.71%	51	1.60%	19	0.60%	2,180	68.38%	3,188	N/A
Montclair	San Bernardino	4,002	61.50%	2,228	34.24%	242	3.72%	35	0.54%	1,774	27.26%	6,507	12.21%
Needles	San Bernardino	608	63.40%	279	29.09%	69	7.19%	3	0.31%	329	34.31%	959	39.15%
Ontario	San Bernardino	12,404	60.67%	7,071	34.58%	875	4.28%	96	0.47%	5,333	26.08%	20,446	14.65%
Redlands	San Bernardino	9,993	66.00%	4,660	30.78%	435	2.87%	53	0.35%	5,333	35.22%	15,141	7.73%
Rialto	San Bernardino	5,710	58.54%	3,584	36.74%	409	4.19%	51	0.52%	2,126	21.80%	9,754	16.18%
San Bernardino	San Bernardino	17,927	49.39%	16,963	46.73%	1,215	3.35%	192	0.53%	964	2.66%	36,297	11.34%
Upland	San Bernardino	9,722	69.14%	3,818	27.15%	460	3.27%	62	0.44%	5,904	41.99%	14,062	10.80%
Victorville	San Bernardino	2,062	64.38%	965	30.13%	165	5.15%	11	0.34%	1,097	34.25%	3,203	17.27%
Unincorporated Area	San Bernardino	58,498	61.10%	31,728	33.14%	5,088	5.31%	427	0.45%	26,770	27.96%	95,741	13.79%
Unapportioned Absentees	San Bernardino	8,412	68.80%	3,414	27.92%	306	2.50%	95	0.78%	4,998	40.88%	12,227	9.51%
Carlsbad	San Diego (Note: The sum of Schmitz’s votes across San Diego County municipalities exceeds the official county-wide tally by 100.)	4,401	67.29%	1,853	28.33%	238	3.64%	48	0.73%	2,548	38.96%	6,540	13.70%
Chula Vista	San Diego	17,708	64.81%	8,601	31.48%	920	3.37%	93	0.34%	9,107	33.33%	27,322	18.43%
Coronado	San Diego	4,338	73.34%	1,390	23.50%	163	2.76%	24	0.41%	2,948	49.84%	5,915	3.70%
Del Mar	San Diego	1,235	49.24%	1,201	47.89%	47	1.87%	25	1.00%	34	1.36%	2,508	-22.13%
El Cajon	San Diego	13,997	62.08%	7,540	33.44%	922	4.09%	86	0.38%	6,457	28.64%	22,545	8.98%
Escondido	San Diego	12,170	67.72%	4,644	25.84%	1,088	6.05%	68	0.38%	7,526	41.88%	17,970	13.58%
Imperial Beach	San Diego	2,967	59.41%	1,793	35.90%	198	3.96%	36	0.72%	1,174	23.51%	4,994	18.27%
La Mesa	San Diego	13,263	63.76%	6,735	32.38%	706	3.39%	97	0.47%	6,528	31.38%	20,801	1.48%
National City	San Diego	5,492	54.77%	4,200	41.89%	292	2.91%	43	0.43%	1,292	12.89%	10,027	16.85%
Oceanside	San Diego	11,110	68.54%	4,477	27.62%	581	3.58%	41	0.25%	6,633	40.92%	16,209	19.18%
San Diego	San Diego	170,636	57.84%	114,997	38.98%	7,943	2.69%	1,423	0.48%	55,639	18.86%	294,999	4.34%
San Marcos	San Diego	1,866	68.58%	712	26.17%	133	4.89%	10	0.37%	1,154	42.41%	2,721	15.13%
Vista	San Diego	7,864	70.76%	2,698	24.28%	514	4.62%	38	0.34%	5,166	46.48%	11,114	14.51%
Unincorporated Area	San Diego	80,310	65.22%	36,340	29.51%	5,922	4.81%	564	0.46%	43,970	35.71%	123,136	7.60%
Unapportioned Absentees	San Diego	24,270	70.76%	9,274	27.04%	621	1.81%	132	0.38%	14,996	43.72%	34,297	5.12%
San Francisco	San Francisco	127,461	41.86%	170,882	56.12%	3,702	1.22%	2,469	0.81%	-43,421	-14.26%	304,514	11.43%
Escalon	San Joaquin	532	58.40%	335	36.77%	37	4.06%	7	0.77%	197	21.62%	911	13.06%
Lodi	San Joaquin	8,236	64.05%	3,884	30.21%	700	5.44%	38	0.30%	4,352	33.85%	12,858	-1.74%
Manteca	San Joaquin	3,072	54.46%	2,259	40.05%	285	5.05%	25	0.44%	813	14.41%	5,641	18.52%
Ripon	San Joaquin	784	69.50%	297	26.33%	42	3.72%	5	0.44%	487	43.17%	1,128	3.45%
Stockton	San Joaquin	20,916	50.40%	18,870	45.47%	1,410	3.40%	303	0.73%	2,046	4.93%	41,499	9.93%
Tracy	San Joaquin	3,022	54.16%	2,251	40.34%	273	4.89%	34	0.61%	771	13.82%	5,580	21.19%
Unincorporated Area	San Joaquin	21,946	56.39%	14,567	37.43%	2,162	5.55%	246	0.63%	7,379	18.96%	38,921	13.76%
Unapportioned Absentees	San Joaquin	3,138	63.81%	1,599	32.51%	118	2.40%	63	1.28%	1,539	31.29%	4,918	7.29%
Arroyo Grande	San Luis Obispo	1,930	59.35%	1,148	35.30%	111	3.41%	63	1.94%	782	24.05%	3,252	7.71%
Grover City	San Luis Obispo	1,020	47.18%	1,045	48.33%	53	2.45%	44	2.04%	-25	-1.16%	2,162	7.57%
Morro Bay	San Luis Obispo	2,328	56.22%	1,702	41.10%	86	2.08%	25	0.60%	626	15.12%	4,141	9.82%
El Paso de Robles	San Luis Obispo	1,713	67.05%	755	29.55%	78	3.05%	9	0.35%	958	37.50%	2,555	15.25%
Pismo Beach	San Luis Obispo	1,063	53.42%	851	42.76%	51	2.56%	25	1.26%	212	10.65%	1,990	7.19%
San Luis Obispo	San Luis Obispo	8,336	52.00%	7,289	45.47%	253	1.58%	152	0.95%	1,047	6.53%	16,030	0.96%
Unincorporated Area	San Luis Obispo	9,835	57.13%	6,738	39.14%	457	2.65%	185	1.07%	3,097	17.99%	17,215	-0.81%
Unapportioned Absentees	San Luis Obispo	2,341	63.68%	1,251	34.03%	67	1.82%	17	0.46%	1,090	29.65%	3,676	5.48%
Atherton	San Mateo	3,042	71.83%	1,065	25.15%	59	1.39%	69	1.63%	1,977	46.68%	4,235	3.22%
Belmont	San Mateo	6,443	56.97%	4,432	39.19%	183	1.62%	251	2.22%	2,011	17.78%	11,309	15.52%
Brisbane	San Mateo	508	39.66%	703	54.88%	25	1.95%	45	3.51%	-195	-15.22%	1,281	15.63%
Burlingame	San Mateo	7,858	59.08%	5,036	37.86%	194	1.46%	212	1.59%	2,822	21.22%	13,300	10.10%
Colma	San Mateo	65	41.67%	83	53.21%	2	1.28%	6	3.85%	-18	-11.54%	156	1.23%
Daly City	San Mateo	11,193	45.96%	12,016	49.34%	415	1.70%	729	2.99%	-823	-3.38%	24,353	22.81%
Foster City	San Mateo	3,833	61.59%	2,270	36.48%	58	0.93%	62	1.00%	1,563	25.12%	6,223	N/A
Half Moon Bay	San Mateo	1,106	54.19%	781	38.27%	66	3.23%	88	4.31%	325	15.92%	2,041	25.11%
Hillsborough	San Mateo	3,643	77.64%	927	19.76%	43	0.92%	79	1.68%	2,716	57.89%	4,692	6.64%
Menlo Park	San Mateo	7,012	52.76%	5,647	42.49%	120	0.90%	512	3.85%	1,365	10.27%	13,291	3.31%
Millbrae	San Mateo	5,731	57.99%	3,789	38.34%	171	1.73%	192	1.94%	1,942	19.65%	9,883	19.88%
Pacifica	San Mateo	5,892	44.60%	6,677	50.54%	390	2.95%	253	1.91%	-785	-5.94%	13,212	18.87%
Portola Valley	San Mateo	1,220	58.94%	774	37.39%	32	1.55%	44	2.13%	446	21.55%	2,070	0.97%
Redwood City	San Mateo	12,437	52.49%	9,938	41.94%	432	1.82%	887	3.74%	2,499	10.55%	23,694	14.92%
San Bruno	San Mateo	7,248	50.05%	6,667	46.04%	284	1.96%	283	1.95%	581	4.01%	14,482	21.39%
San Carlos	San Mateo	8,039	61.63%	4,500	34.50%	166	1.27%	340	2.61%	3,539	27.13%	13,045	13.01%
San Mateo	San Mateo	19,689	54.64%	14,934	41.44%	527	1.46%	885	2.46%	4,755	13.20%	36,035	13.15%
South San Francisco	San Mateo	8,352	46.02%	8,976	49.46%	310	1.71%	509	2.80%	-624	-3.44%	18,147	25.25%
Woodside	San Mateo	1,537	61.11%	886	35.23%	32	1.27%	60	2.39%	651	25.88%	2,515	-2.54%
Unincorporated Area	San Mateo	11,977	42.22%	14,515	51.17%	456	1.61%	1,420	5.01%	-2,538	-8.95%	28,368	4.16%
Unapportioned Absentees	San Mateo	8,552	61.63%	5,129	36.96%	114	0.82%	82	0.59%	3,423	24.67%	13,877	0.90%
Carpinteria	Santa Barbara	1,513	53.50%	1,251	44.24%	43	1.52%	21	0.74%	262	9.26%	2,828	9.56%
Guadalupe	Santa Barbara	354	50.21%	334	47.38%	13	1.84%	4	0.57%	20	2.84%	705	22.01%
Lompoc	Santa Barbara	4,766	61.90%	2,421	31.44%	481	6.25%	32	0.42%	2,345	30.45%	7,700	15.25%
Santa Barbara	Santa Barbara	17,618	49.92%	16,745	47.45%	690	1.96%	236	0.67%	873	2.47%	35,289	-1.27%
Santa Maria	Santa Barbara	7,875	64.71%	3,825	31.43%	422	3.47%	47	0.39%	4,050	33.28%	12,169	14.58%
Unincorporated Area	Santa Barbara	30,609	54.90%	23,446	42.05%	1,362	2.44%	334	0.60%	7,163	12.85%	55,751	-4.49%
Unapportioned Absentees	Santa Barbara	4,340	61.49%	2,587	36.65%	92	1.30%	39	0.55%	1,753	24.84%	7,058	-5.40%
Campbell	Santa Clara (Note: The sum of McGovern’s votes across Santa Clara County municipalities exceeds the official county-wide tally by 39.)	5,106	52.59%	4,359	44.90%	180	1.85%	64	0.66%	747	7.69%	9,709	11.23%
Cupertino	Santa Clara	5,748	63.80%	3,062	33.99%	125	1.39%	74	0.82%	2,686	29.81%	9,009	15.16%
Gilroy	Santa Clara	2,196	51.39%	1,938	45.35%	104	2.43%	35	0.82%	258	6.04%	4,273	15.56%
Los Altos	Santa Clara	8,817	64.46%	4,586	33.53%	178	1.30%	97	0.71%	4,231	30.93%	13,678	8.59%
Los Altos Hills	Santa Clara	2,194	61.49%	1,283	35.96%	53	1.49%	38	1.07%	911	25.53%	3,568	5.16%
Los Gatos	Santa Clara	6,228	57.36%	4,327	39.85%	213	1.96%	90	0.83%	1,901	17.51%	10,858	3.81%
Milpitas	Santa Clara	4,395	47.41%	4,584	49.45%	264	2.85%	27	0.29%	-189	-2.04%	9,270	18.00%
Monte Sereno	Santa Clara	866	61.37%	504	35.72%	27	1.91%	14	0.99%	362	25.66%	1,411	6.01%
Morgan Hill	Santa Clara	1,119	55.95%	826	41.30%	48	2.40%	7	0.35%	293	14.65%	2,000	18.24%
Mountain View	Santa Clara	11,754	50.17%	11,204	47.82%	328	1.40%	144	0.61%	550	2.35%	23,430	3.19%
Palo Alto	Santa Clara	12,919	44.10%	15,834	54.05%	261	0.89%	280	0.96%	-2,915	-9.95%	29,294	-3.90%
San Jose	Santa Clara	89,906	50.09%	85,043	47.38%	3,527	1.97%	1,002	0.56%	4,863	2.71%	179,478	11.40%
Santa Clara	Santa Clara	16,024	49.08%	15,740	48.21%	668	2.05%	217	0.66%	284	0.87%	32,649	16.48%
Saratoga	Santa Clara	9,265	68.16%	3,967	29.18%	263	1.93%	98	0.72%	5,298	38.98%	13,593	9.35%
Sunnyvale	Santa Clara	22,876	56.66%	16,585	41.08%	658	1.63%	258	0.64%	6,291	15.58%	40,377	14.86%
Unincorporated Area	Santa Clara	25,883	47.89%	26,650	49.31%	1,109	2.05%	401	0.74%	-767	-1.42%	54,043	-1.94%
Unapportioned Absentees	Santa Clara	12,038	58.72%	8,053	39.28%	230	1.12%	180	0.88%	3,985	19.44%	20,501	N/A
Capitola	Santa Cruz	1,619	49.89%	1,515	46.69%	77	2.37%	34	1.05%	104	3.20%	3,245	-9.57%
Santa Cruz	Santa Cruz	7,849	44.17%	9,297	52.32%	456	2.57%	166	0.93%	-1,448	-8.15%	17,768	-17.91%
Scotts Valley	Santa Cruz	1,661	68.07%	669	27.42%	91	3.73%	19	0.78%	992	40.66%	2,440	8.91%
Watsonville	Santa Cruz	2,706	52.70%	2,301	44.81%	88	1.71%	40	0.78%	405	7.89%	5,135	21.97%
Unincorporated Area	Santa Cruz	18,818	50.35%	17,048	45.61%	1,157	3.10%	354	0.95%	1,770	4.74%	37,377	-5.88%
Unapportioned Absentees	Santa Cruz	2,146	57.12%	1,506	40.09%	62	1.65%	43	1.14%	640	17.03%	3,757	-11.12%
Anderson	Shasta	910	41.86%	1,113	51.20%	132	6.07%	19	0.87%	-203	-9.34%	2,174	13.76%
Redding	Shasta	3,583	48.66%	3,469	47.11%	266	3.61%	45	0.61%	114	1.55%	7,363	7.63%
Unincorporated Area	Shasta	10,991	45.68%	11,823	49.14%	1,146	4.76%	100	0.42%	-832	-3.46%	24,060	7.61%
Unapportioned Absentees	Shasta	1,134	56.64%	809	40.41%	51	2.55%	8	0.40%	325	16.23%	2,002	2.90%
Loyalton	Sierra	144	40.45%	207	58.15%	3	0.84%	2	0.56%	-63	-17.70%	356	5.06%
Unincorporated Area	Sierra	388	48.93%	376	47.41%	22	2.77%	7	0.88%	12	1.51%	793	-5.83%
Unapportioned Absentees	Sierra	97	55.43%	75	42.86%	2	1.14%	1	0.57%	22	12.57%	175	0.48%
Dorris	Siskiyou	168	50.15%	145	43.28%	21	6.27%	1	0.30%	23	6.87%	335	12.93%
Dunsmuir	Siskiyou	391	42.92%	491	53.90%	24	2.63%	5	0.55%	-100	-10.98%	911	21.70%
Etna	Siskiyou	190	66.20%	89	31.01%	7	2.44%	1	0.35%	101	35.19%	287	8.55%
Fort Jones	Siskiyou	163	65.73%	70	28.23%	13	5.24%	2	0.81%	93	37.50%	248	19.61%
Montague	Siskiyou	209	58.22%	133	37.05%	13	3.62%	4	1.11%	76	21.17%	359	14.81%
Mt. Shasta	Siskiyou	464	44.15%	537	51.09%	49	4.66%	1	0.10%	-73	-6.95%	1,051	5.75%
Tulelake	Siskiyou	195	68.90%	69	24.38%	19	6.71%	0	0.00%	126	44.52%	283	-4.83%
Weed	Siskiyou	390	31.45%	809	65.24%	40	3.23%	1	0.08%	-419	-33.79%	1,240	17.44%
Yreka	Siskiyou	1,259	57.15%	850	38.58%	77	3.50%	17	0.77%	409	18.57%	2,203	-0.23%
Unincorporated Area	Siskiyou	3,412	52.62%	2,708	41.76%	332	5.12%	32	0.49%	704	10.86%	6,484	4.47%
Unapportioned Absentees	Siskiyou	722	55.88%	533	41.25%	26	2.01%	11	0.85%	189	14.63%	1,292	8.25%
Benicia	Solano	1,541	51.26%	1,351	44.94%	93	3.09%	21	0.70%	190	6.32%	3,006	34.11%
Dixon	Solano	926	60.17%	569	36.97%	39	2.53%	5	0.32%	357	23.20%	1,539	16.85%
Fairfield	Solano	6,515	60.04%	3,959	36.48%	328	3.02%	50	0.46%	2,556	23.55%	10,852	36.35%
Rio Vista	Solano	779	60.34%	483	37.41%	28	2.17%	1	0.08%	296	22.93%	1,291	17.82%
Suisun City	Solano	234	44.57%	279	53.14%	10	1.90%	2	0.38%	-45	-8.57%	525	24.85%
Vacaville	Solano	4,424	58.82%	2,871	38.17%	187	2.49%	39	0.52%	1,553	20.65%	7,521	24.25%
Vallejo	Solano	11,916	48.43%	11,862	48.21%	720	2.93%	109	0.44%	54	0.22%	24,607	31.79%
Unincorporated Area	Solano	2,875	52.92%	2,368	43.59%	165	3.04%	25	0.46%	507	9.33%	5,433	9.69%
Unapportioned Absentees	Solano	2,104	66.10%	1,024	32.17%	46	1.45%	9	0.28%	1,080	33.93%	3,183	24.12%
Cloverdale	Sonoma	740	55.39%	535	40.04%	53	3.97%	8	0.60%	205	15.34%	1,336	27.14%
Cotati	Sonoma	365	35.37%	639	61.92%	16	1.55%	12	1.16%	-274	-26.55%	1,032	-12.07%
Healdsburg	Sonoma	1,469	61.34%	817	34.11%	99	4.13%	10	0.42%	652	27.22%	2,395	13.70%
Petaluma	Sonoma	6,865	58.93%	4,455	38.24%	266	2.28%	63	0.54%	2,410	20.69%	11,649	24.84%
Rohnert Park	Sonoma	1,388	50.07%	1,289	46.50%	77	2.78%	18	0.65%	99	3.57%	2,772	16.06%
Santa Rosa	Sonoma	16,436	57.82%	10,946	38.51%	850	2.99%	192	0.68%	5,490	19.31%	28,424	9.24%
Sebastopol	Sonoma	1,035	53.54%	790	40.87%	95	4.91%	13	0.67%	245	12.67%	1,933	3.17%
Sonoma	Sonoma	1,637	64.60%	828	32.68%	53	2.09%	16	0.63%	809	31.93%	2,534	24.58%
Unincorporated Area	Sonoma	24,035	50.88%	21,278	45.04%	1,569	3.32%	358	0.76%	2,757	5.84%	47,240	2.18%
Unapportioned Absentees	Sonoma	3,727	61.34%	2,169	35.70%	114	1.88%	66	1.09%	1,558	25.64%	6,076	-1.93%
Ceres	Stanislaus	1,233	50.12%	1,165	47.36%	54	2.20%	8	0.33%	68	2.76%	2,460	14.76%
Modesto	Stanislaus	14,576	51.09%	13,118	45.98%	655	2.30%	180	0.63%	1,458	5.11%	28,529	6.67%
Newman	Stanislaus	390	47.62%	408	49.82%	20	2.44%	1	0.12%	-18	-2.20%	819	23.88%
Oakdale	Stanislaus	1,375	54.85%	1,062	42.36%	56	2.23%	14	0.56%	313	12.49%	2,507	11.15%
Patterson	Stanislaus	504	45.65%	580	52.54%	18	1.63%	2	0.18%	-76	-6.88%	1,104	2.43%
Riverbank	Stanislaus	400	36.36%	671	61.00%	24	2.18%	5	0.45%	-271	-24.64%	1,100	11.61%
Turlock	Stanislaus	3,878	57.78%	2,608	38.86%	193	2.88%	33	0.49%	1,270	18.92%	6,712	0.93%
Waterford	Stanislaus	352	48.48%	341	46.97%	29	3.99%	4	0.55%	11	1.52%	726	N/A
Unincorporated Area	Stanislaus	14,601	49.98%	13,640	46.69%	835	2.86%	136	0.47%	961	3.29%	29,212	10.44%
Unapportioned Absentees	Stanislaus	2,212	59.88%	1,412	38.22%	59	1.60%	11	0.30%	800	21.66%	3,694	0.70%
Live Oak	Sutter	409	54.97%	301	40.46%	32	4.30%	2	0.27%	108	14.52%	744	8.79%
Yuba City	Sutter	5,166	71.85%	1,854	25.79%	141	1.96%	29	0.40%	3,312	46.06%	7,190	22.09%
Unincorporated Area	Sutter	3,898	52.72%	2,991	40.45%	452	6.11%	53	0.72%	907	12.27%	7,394	-18.64%
Unapportioned Absentees	Sutter	751	72.00%	263	25.22%	22	2.11%	7	0.67%	488	46.79%	1,043	9.37%
Corning	Tehama	688	53.29%	544	42.14%	58	4.49%	1	0.08%	144	11.15%	1,291	0.30%
Red Bluff	Tehama	1,332	44.36%	1,318	43.89%	342	11.39%	11	0.37%	14	0.47%	3,003	1.39%
Tehama	Tehama	64	53.78%	48	40.34%	7	5.88%	0	0.00%	16	13.45%	119	9.24%
Unincorporated Area	Tehama	3,486	48.42%	2,992	41.56%	702	9.75%	19	0.26%	494	6.86%	7,199	0.38%
Unapportioned Absentees	Tehama	484	59.61%	273	33.62%	52	6.40%	3	0.37%	211	25.99%	812	8.81%
Unincorporated Area	Trinity	1,868	50.75%	1,621	44.04%	169	4.59%	23	0.62%	247	6.71%	3,681	6.92%
Dinuba	Tulare (Note: The sum of Schmitz’s votes across Tulare County municipalities is 30 fewer than the official county-wide tally.)	1,387	55.37%	1,052	42.00%	56	2.24%	10	0.40%	335	13.37%	2,505	-6.07%
Exeter	Tulare	963	62.53%	513	33.31%	62	4.03%	2	0.13%	450	29.22%	1,540	10.61%
Farmersville	Tulare	296	46.61%	321	50.55%	18	2.83%	0	0.00%	-25	-3.94%	635	6.14%
Lindsay	Tulare	987	58.65%	633	37.61%	58	3.45%	5	0.30%	354	21.03%	1,683	4.00%
Porterville	Tulare	2,308	60.45%	1,373	35.96%	112	2.93%	25	0.65%	935	24.49%	3,818	6.69%
Tulare	Tulare	2,486	48.99%	2,410	47.49%	172	3.39%	7	0.14%	76	1.50%	5,075	23.04%
Visalia	Tulare	7,419	63.70%	3,875	33.27%	311	2.67%	41	0.35%	3,544	30.43%	11,646	6.10%
Woodlake	Tulare	390	47.68%	398	48.66%	28	3.42%	2	0.24%	-8	-0.98%	818	-0.58%
Unincorporated Area	Tulare	18,057	60.45%	10,485	35.10%	1,181	3.95%	148	0.50%	7,572	25.35%	29,871	11.76%
Unapportioned Absentees	Tulare	1,755	69.40%	715	28.27%	48	1.90%	11	0.43%	1,040	41.12%	2,529	N/A
Sonora	Tuolumne	909	55.46%	680	41.49%	36	2.20%	14	0.85%	229	13.97%	1,639	2.27%
Unincorporated Area	Tuolumne	4,383	53.01%	3,586	43.37%	249	3.01%	50	0.60%	797	9.64%	8,268	8.43%
Unapportioned Absentees	Tuolumne	602	63.44%	330	34.77%	14	1.48%	3	0.32%	272	28.66%	949	9.43%
Camarillo	Ventura	6,231	70.90%	2,162	24.60%	362	4.12%	33	0.38%	4,069	46.30%	8,788	24.84%
Fillmore	Ventura	1,130	57.80%	741	37.90%	80	4.09%	4	0.20%	389	19.90%	1,955	20.97%
Ojai	Ventura	1,517	58.68%	976	37.76%	83	3.21%	9	0.35%	541	20.93%	2,585	10.61%
Oxnard	Ventura	12,778	58.09%	8,465	38.48%	668	3.04%	87	0.40%	4,313	19.61%	21,998	30.67%
Port Hueneme	Ventura	2,652	65.27%	1,242	30.57%	155	3.81%	14	0.34%	1,410	34.70%	4,063	31.65%
Santa Paula	Ventura	3,080	54.66%	2,363	41.93%	181	3.21%	11	0.20%	717	12.72%	5,635	15.21%
Simi Valley	Ventura	14,674	67.15%	6,137	28.08%	972	4.45%	69	0.32%	8,537	39.07%	21,852	N/A
Thousand Oaks	Ventura	12,800	68.96%	5,028	27.09%	648	3.49%	85	0.46%	7,772	41.87%	18,561	9.88%
Ventura	Ventura	15,664	59.95%	9,430	36.09%	915	3.50%	120	0.46%	6,234	23.86%	26,129	19.33%
Unincorporated Area	Ventura	18,537	61.21%	10,303	34.02%	1,332	4.40%	114	0.38%	8,234	27.19%	30,286	12.37%
Unapportioned Absentees	Ventura	6,247	69.97%	2,460	27.55%	190	2.13%	31	0.35%	3,787	42.42%	8,928	11.67%
Davis	Yolo	5,203	33.13%	10,195	64.91%	169	1.08%	139	0.89%	-4,992	-31.78%	15,706	-11.08%
Winters	Yolo	423	50.90%	383	46.09%	21	2.53%	4	0.48%	40	4.81%	831	13.53%
Woodland	Yolo	4,662	55.17%	3,587	42.44%	164	1.94%	38	0.45%	1,075	12.72%	8,451	21.23%
Unincorporated Area	Yolo	6,747	42.98%	8,447	53.81%	431	2.75%	73	0.47%	-1,700	-10.83%	15,698	10.00%
Unapportioned Absentees	Yolo	934	45.72%	1,082	52.96%	15	0.73%	12	0.59%	-148	-7.24%	2,043	-6.49%
Marysville	Yuba	2,147	62.38%	1,164	33.82%	113	3.28%	18	0.52%	983	28.56%	3,442	6.40%
Wheatland	Yuba	233	55.88%	169	40.53%	15	3.60%	0	0.00%	64	15.35%	417	23.40%
Unincorporated Area	Yuba	3,742	52.82%	2,931	41.37%	380	5.36%	31	0.44%	811	11.45%	7,084	11.08%
Unapportioned Absentees	Yuba	501	73.25%	171	25.00%	10	1.46%	2	0.29%	330	48.25%	684	31.43%
Totals (Note: Statewide candidate vote percentages and the total vote number differ here because California's Supplement to Statement of Vote does not count write in votes as part of the city totals. Vote totals of candidates differ due to discrepancies in county totals mentioned in other notes.)		4,601,908	55.01%	3,475,729	41.55%	232,619	2.78%	55,161	0.66%	1,137,660	13.60%	8,365,417	10.52%

==== Cities & Unincorporated Areas that flipped from Democratic to Republican ====
- Fremont (Alameda)
- Newark (Alameda)
- San Leandro (Alameda)
- Unincorporated Area (Alameda)
- Jackson (Amador)
- Plymouth (Amador)
- Sutter Creek (Amador)
- Unincorporated Area (Amador)
- Concord (Contra Costa)
- Martinez (Contra Costa)
- Pinole (Contra Costa)
- Clovis (Fresno)
- Coalinga (Fresno)
- Fowler (Fresno)
- Kerman (Fresno)
- Selma (Fresno)
- Eureka (Humboldt)
- Trinidad (Humboldt)
- Calipatria (Imperial)
- Delano (Kern)
- Maricopa (Kern)
- Hanford (Kings)
- Lemoore (Kings)
- Unincorporated Area (Kings)
- Unincorporated Area (Lassen)
- Azusa (Los Angeles)
- Baldwin Park (Los Angeles)
- Bell Gardens (Los Angeles)
- Cudahy (Los Angeles)
- El Monte (Los Angeles)
- Lawndale (Los Angeles)
- Maywood (Los Angeles)
- Montebello (Los Angeles)
- Monterey Park (Los Angeles)
- Norwalk (Los Angeles)
- Paramount (Los Angeles)
- Rosemead (Los Angeles)
- San Fernando (Los Angeles)
- Santa Fe Springs (Los Angeles)
- Chowchilla (Madera)
- Ukiah (Mendocino)
- Atwater (Merced)
- Dos Palos (Merced)
- Merced (Merced)
- Unincorporated Area (Merced)
- Alturas (Modoc)
- Gonzales (Monterey)
- Sand City (Monterey)
- Napa (Napa)
- Yountville (Napa)
- Unincorporated Area (Plumas)
- Blythe (Riverside)
- Desert Hot Springs (Riverside)
- Folsom (Sacramento)
- Unincorporated Area (Sacramento)
- Hollister (San Benito)
- Barstow (San Bernardino)
- Fontana (San Bernardino)
- Needles (San Bernardino)
- San Bernardino (San Bernardino)
- National City (San Diego)
- Manteca (San Joaquin)
- Stockton (San Joaquin)
- Tracy (San Joaquin)
- Half Moon Bay (San Mateo)
- Millbrae (San Mateo)
- Redwood City (San Mateo)
- San Bruno (San Mateo)
- Carpinteria (Santa Barbara)
- Guadalupe (Santa Barbara)
- Campbell (Santa Clara)
- Gilroy (Santa Clara)
- Morgan Hill (Santa Clara)
- Mountain View (Santa Clara)
- San Jose (Santa Clara)
- Santa Clara (Santa Clara)
- Watsonville (Santa Cruz)
- Redding (Shasta)
- Dorris (Siskiyou)
- Benicia (Solano)
- Fairfield (Solano)
- Vacaville (Solano)
- Vallejo (Solano)
- Unincorporated Area (Solano)
- Cloverdale (Sonoma)
- Petaluma (Sonoma)
- Rohnert Park (Sonoma)
- Ceres (Stanislaus)
- Modesto (Stanislaus)
- Unincorporated Area (Stanislaus)
- Red Bluff (Tehama)
- Unincorporated Area (Trinity)
- Tulare (Tulare)
- Fillmore (Ventura)
- Oxnard (Ventura)
- Santa Paula (Ventura)
- Winters (Yolo)
- Woodland (Yolo)
- Wheatland (Yuba)

==== Cities & Unincorporated Areas that flipped from Republican to Democratic ====
- Chico (Butte)
- Westmorland (Imperial)
- Unincorporated Area (Santa Clara)
- Santa Cruz (Santa Cruz)
