= 1958 United States Senate election in California =

- November 4, 1958
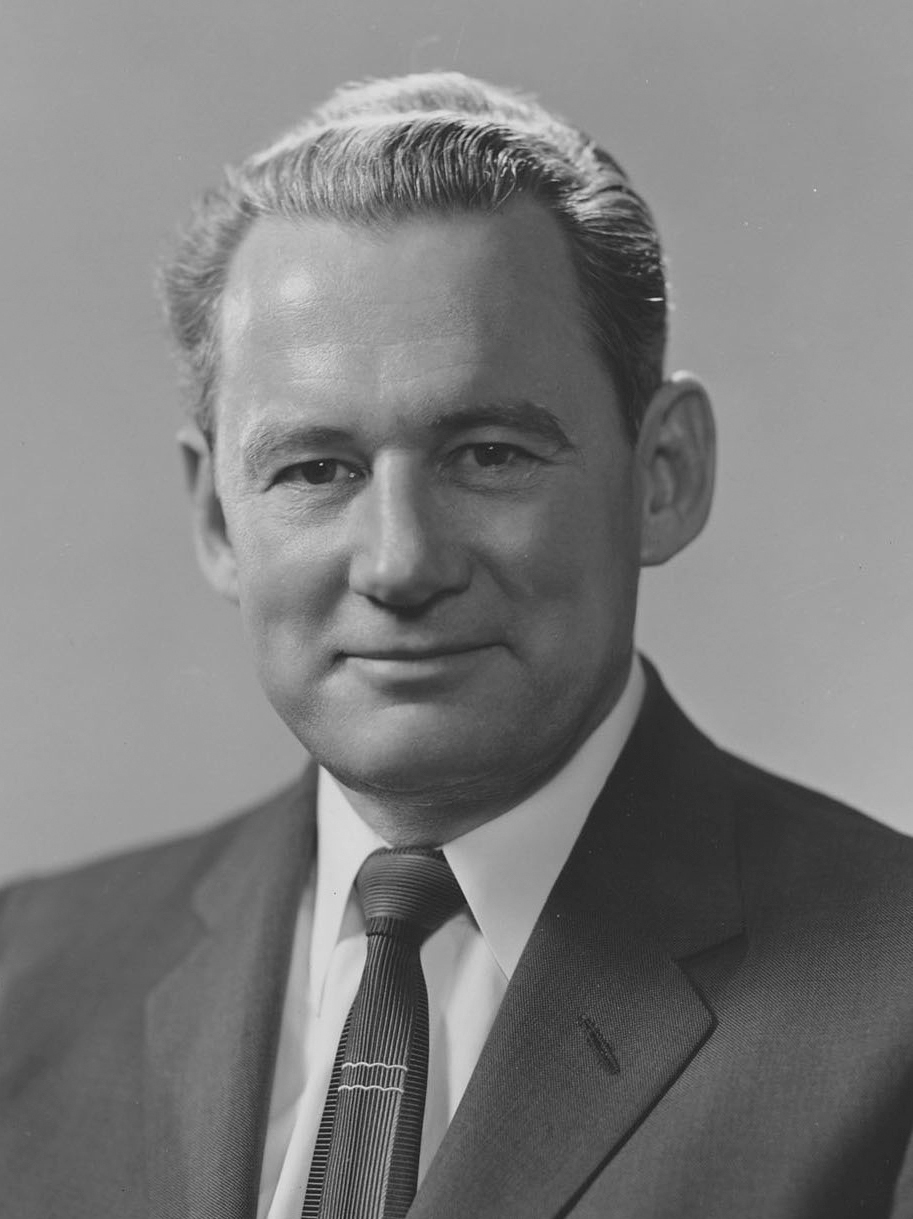

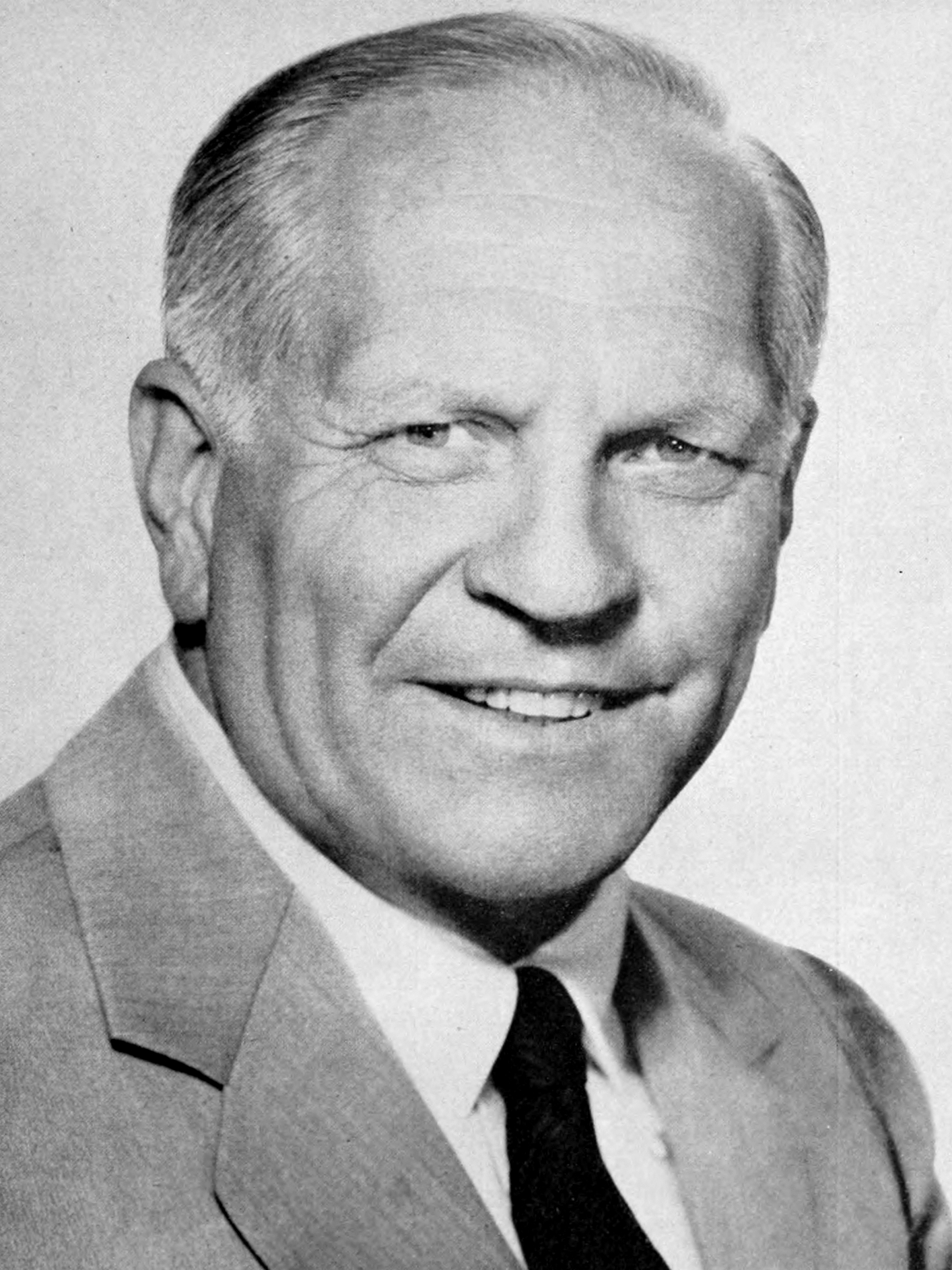
Nominee	Clair Engle	Goodwin Knight
Party	Democratic	Republican
Popular vote	2,927,693	2,204,337
Percentage	57.01%	42.93%
- County results Engle: 50–60% 60–70% 70–80% 80–90% Knight: 50–60%
U.S. senator before election
William F. Knowland
Republican
Elected U.S. Senator
Clair Engle
Democratic

The 1958 United States Senate election in California was held on November 4, 1958.

Incumbent senator William F. Knowland opted not to run for re-election, choosing instead to run for election as governor. Incumbent governor Goodwin Knight exchanged places with Knowland and lost to U.S. Representative Clair Engle in the midst of a national landslide for the Democratic Party.

Knowland's decision to run for governor came in spite of strong opposition from Knight, who had wanted to run for re-election rather than for the Senate. The bad impression left by the feud between the two politicians, along with labor mobilization against Proposition 18, was a major factor in the Democratic landslide in California in 1958.

As of 2026, this was the last time Inyo County voted Democratic in a Senate election contested by both political parties. (Note: Excluding 2016 and 2018, when two Democrats advanced to the general election and the county voted Democratic.) This was one of 15 seats Democrats gained from the Republican Party in 1958, part of a record swing.

== Republican primary ==
Knowland announced his retirement from the Senate in January 1957, ostensibly to spend more time with his family. However, it was an open secret in California Republican politics that Knowland was interested in running for governor. Knowland was hoping to run for president in 1960, and believed that the governorship would provide an effective launching pad for his campaign and allow him to box out potential rival Richard Nixon.

Knight, a moderate, pro-labor Republican, disliked the conservative Knowland and opposed his attempt to enter the gubernatorial primary. Knight attempted to box out Knowland by announcing his run for re-election as governor in August 1957; Knowland announced his run for governor two months later. However, Knowland was able to line up support from major Republican donors (including the oil and aircraft industries), the conservative Los Angeles Times, and Richard Nixon, who held significant sway in the California Republican Party. Facing significant pressure and in ill health, Knight eventually relented and switched from the gubernatorial to the senatorial race in November 1957, after receiving assurances that he would receive endorsements from Nixon and Eisenhower as well as organizational support from the California Republican Party.

George Christopher, the mayor of San Francisco, had announced his candidacy for the Senate after Knowland's retirement. Christopher accused Knight of a double-cross, as well as ethnic prejudice for trying to run against the first major Greek-American candidate for statewide office. However, the strength of the California Republican organization ultimately helped Knight defeat Christopher in the primary.

=== Candidates ===
- George Christopher, Mayor of San Francisco
- William Jolley
- Goodwin Knight, Governor of California
- Alexander Williamson

=== Results ===
Republican primary results by county: Knight: 30–40%; 40–50%; 50–60%; 60–70%; Christopher: 40–50%; Engle: 30–40%; 40–50%; 50–60%

1958 Republican U.S. Senate primary
Party	Candidate	Votes	%
Republican	Goodwin Knight	790,939	49.15%
Republican	George Christopher	558,245	34.69%
Democratic	Clair Engle (cross-filing)	173,845	10.80%
Republican	Alexander D. Williamson	53,273	3.31%
Republican	William Jolley	32,921	2.05%
Total votes		1,609,223	100.00

== Democratic primary ==
=== Candidates ===
- Clair Engle, U.S. Representative from Red Bluff
- Fritjof Thygeson

=== Results ===
General election results
Party	Candidate	Votes	%
Democratic	Clair Engle	1,558,622	70.85%
Republican	Goodwin Knight (cross-filing)	385,170	17.51%
Republican	George Christopher (cross-filing)	221,783	10.08%
Democratic	Fritjof Thygeson	34,316	1.56%
Total votes		2,199,891	100.00

== General election ==
=== Results ===
1958 U.S. Senate election in California
Party	Candidate	Votes	%	±%
Democratic	Clair Engle	2,927,693	57.01%	▲57.01
Republican	Goodwin Knight	2,204,337	42.93%	▼44.86
Write-in	Jesse M. Ritchie	892	0.02%	N/A
Write-in	Ray B. Pollard	281	0.01%	N/A
Write-in	All others	2,018	0.04%	N/A
Total votes		5,135,221	100.00	

== See also ==
- 1958 United States Senate elections
