= Goodwin Knight =

31st Governor of California

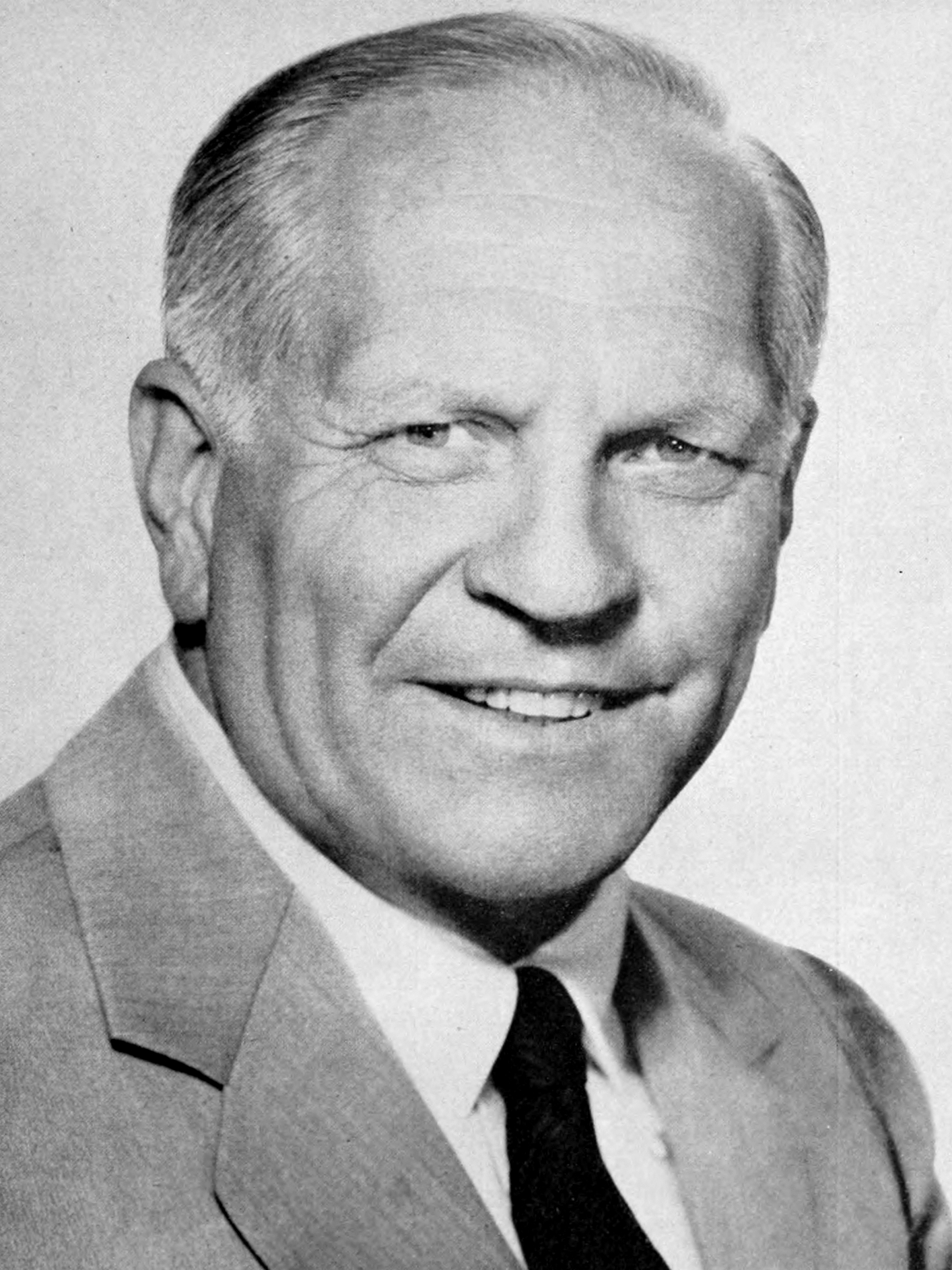
- Knight c. 1956

31st Governor of California
- In office October 5, 1953 – January 5, 1959
- Lieutenant: Harold J. Powers
- Preceded by: Earl Warren
- Succeeded by: Pat Brown

35th Lieutenant Governor of California
- In office January 7, 1947 – October 5, 1953
- Governor: Earl Warren
- Preceded by: Frederick F. Houser
- Succeeded by: Harold J. Powers

Judge of the Los Angeles County Superior Court
- In office September 23, 1935 – January 7, 1947
- Appointed by: Frank Merriam

Personal details
- Born: Goodwin Jess Knight; December 9, 1896 Provo, Utah, U.S.
- Died: May 22, 1970 (aged 73) Inglewood, California, U.S.
- Party: Republican
- Spouses: Arvilla Cooley (m. 1925; died 1952) Virginia Carlson (m. 1954)
- Children: 2
- Education: Stanford University (AB)
- Profession: Judge

Military service
- Allegiance: United States
- Branch/service: United States Navy
- Years of service: 1918–1919
- Rank: Seaman
- Battles/wars: World War I

Goodwin Jess "Goodie" Knight (December 9, 1896 – May 22, 1970) was an American politician and judge who served as the 31st governor of California from 1953 to 1959. A member of the Republican Party, he previously served as the 35th lieutenant governor of California from 1947 to 1953 under Governor Earl Warren.

Knight was born in Utah and moved to Los Angeles with his family when he was a child. He followed a career in law and politics, becoming a Superior Court judge before moving into politics. He was elected lieutenant governor of California in 1946, serving under Governor Earl Warren. Upon Warren's appointment as Chief Justice of the United States by President Dwight D. Eisenhower, Knight assumed the governorship before being elected in his own right in 1954. His tenure as governor was marked by conflicts within his party. He chose not to run for a second full term as governor in 1958 and made an unsuccessful bid for the U.S. Senate. He attempted to make a return to the governorship in 1962, but withdrew from the race.

Knight was married twice and had two daughters. He died in 1970, shortly after the suicide of his daughter. His funeral was attended by high-profile individuals including then-California Governor Ronald Reagan and U.S. Senator Barry Goldwater.

== Biography ==
=== Early years ===
Knight was born in Provo, Utah, but his family moved to Los Angeles when he was a boy. His father, Jesse Jasper Knight (nephew of mining magnate Jesse Knight), was a mining engineer, but Goodwin followed in the footsteps of his maternal grandfather, John B. Milner, who was a judge in Provo.

Knight attended high school in Los Angeles, at Manual Arts High School. One of his classmates was Jimmy Doolittle. He earned an A.B. in Law and Business from Stanford University, where he was a staff member of the Stanford Chaparral in 1919. Knight also attended Cornell University. He served in the U.S. Navy during World War I.

=== Career ===
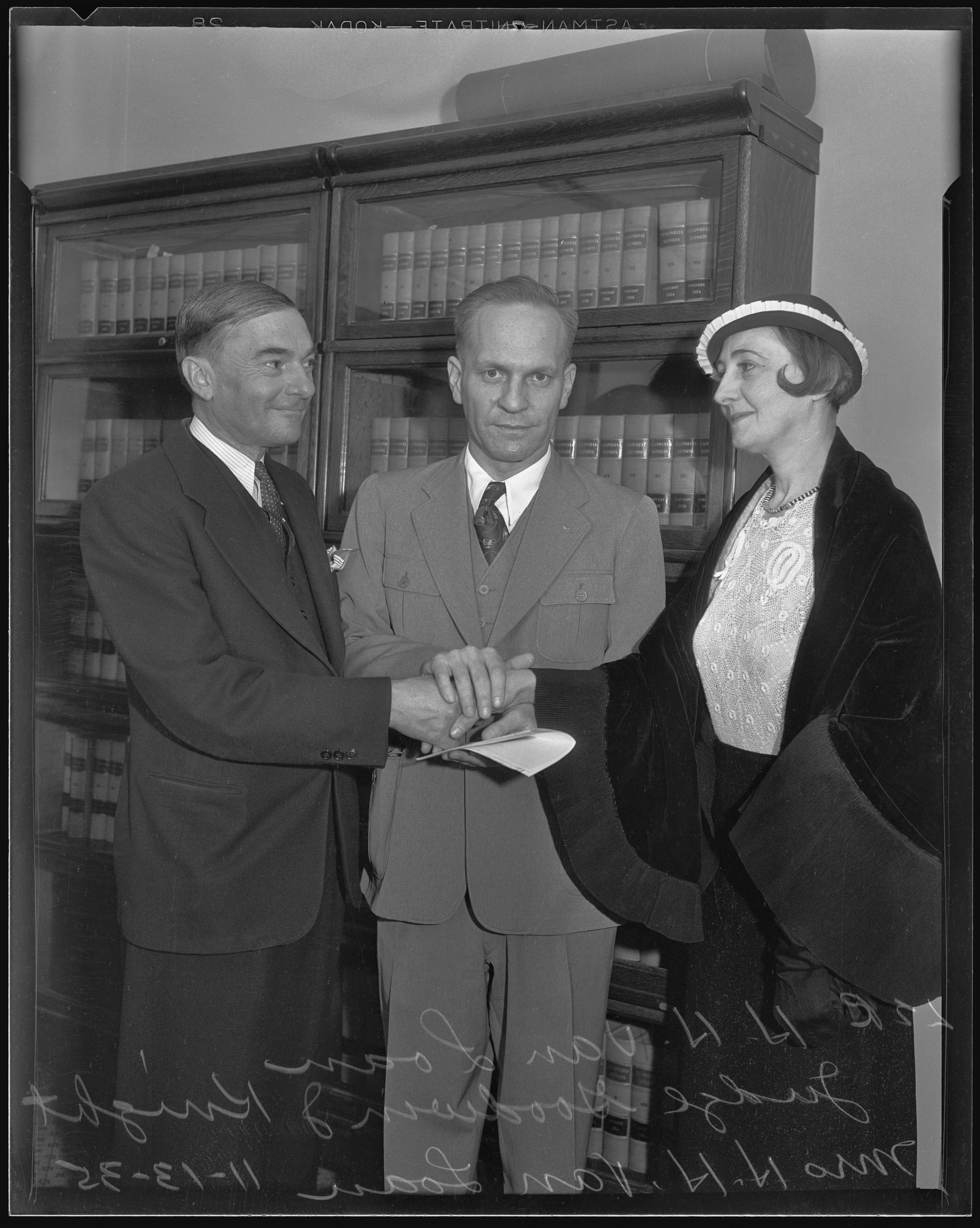
H. H. Van Loan and Bozena Grotte are married to each other for a second time by Judge Goodwin Knight, 1935

Knight was a judge of the Superior Court in Los Angeles beginning in 1935. He was reelected in 1936 and 1942 without significant opposition. His case load varied from the glamorous to the mundane. He oversaw weddings and divorces for Hollywood starlets.

=== Political career and Governor of California ===
Knight began his political career in 1944, when he pursued the Republican nomination for the U.S. Senate. He bowed out early, though, to back Fred Houser. He was elected as the 35th Lieutenant Governor of California to serve under Governor Earl Warren in 1946, then reelected in 1950. He became governor himself when Warren resigned to become Chief Justice of the United States in 1953.

While Lieutenant Governor, he made a guest appearance on Jack Benny's radio show which aired on May 10, 1953, an episode from San Francisco. He appeared on Benny's TV show four years later, on February 10, 1957.

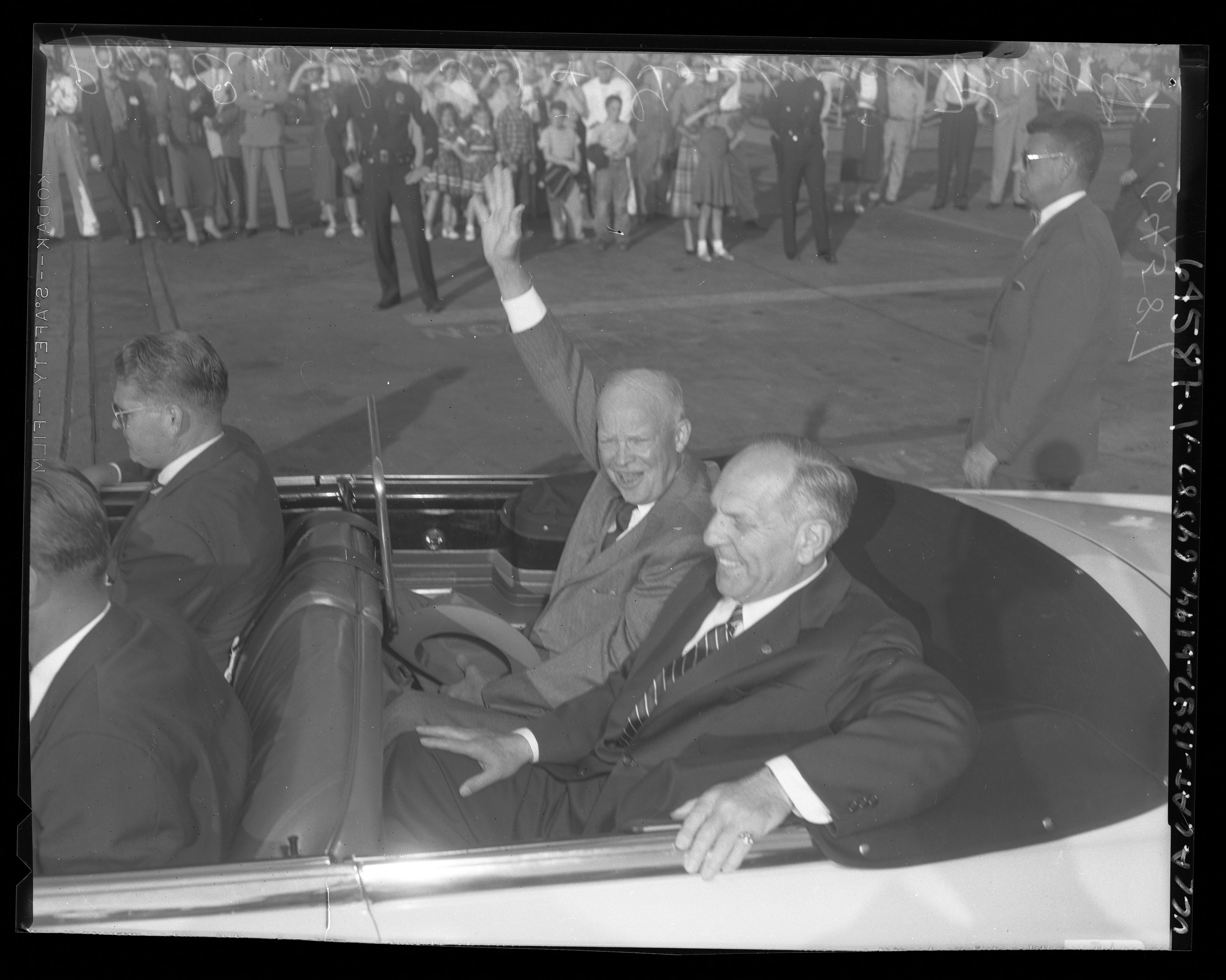
Governor Knight and President Dwight Eisenhower riding in a motorcade

As governor, Knight fought for control of the Republican Party of California with U.S. Senate Majority Leader William Knowland and Vice President Richard Nixon. In 1954, Knight was easily elected to his own full term. At first Knight seemed to make an alliance with Knowland, but this began to sour in 1956 when Knowland supported Nixon for renomination as vice president. In 1957, Knowland announced that he would challenge Knight in the 1958 Republican primary for governor. Knight, known as a moderate, and sympathetic to organized labor, faced a serious threat from more conservative challengers. In November 1957, induced by Norman Chandler (GOP-friendly publisher of The Los Angeles Times), old enemy Nixon and President Dwight Eisenhower (among others), Knight announced he would run for Knowland's Senate seat instead of running for governor again as a way to prevent a tough fight between two California Republicans in a political race. Both Knowland and Knight went down in defeat in 1958, with Knowland losing the gubernatorial race to Edmund G. "Pat" Brown Sr. and Knight losing the Senate race by over 10% to Clair Engle, severely weakening the heretofore-dominant Republicans in the state. This left Nixon in control of the California party and in line for the presidential nomination, which Knowland and Knight had also desired.

Knight was present at the July 17, 1955, opening of Disneyland, and gave a speech following Walt Disney's famous dedication.

In September 1961, Knight announced a bid for a return to the governorship. He later dropped out of the race for the Republican nomination which was won by Nixon, who was in turn defeated by Brown.

In 1964, Knight endorsed Nelson Rockefeller for the Republican nomination against Barry Goldwater. Rockefeller was unsuccessful in stopping Goldwater, the darling of the party's growing conservative wing. Knight never ran for political office again.

=== Personal life ===
Knight's first wife, Arvilla, died of a heart attack on October 29, 1952; the couple had two daughters. He married Virginia Carlson (born Virginia Piegrue on October 12, 1918, in Fort Dodge, Iowa), the widow of an Army lieutenant, on August 2, 1954, at the Episcopal Church of Our Savior in Los Angeles. The couple had no children.

=== Death ===
On May 22, 1970, Knight died three months after his 36-year-old daughter Carolyn Knight Weedman committed suicide. She took her life by carbon monoxide asphyxiation from her car in the garage of her home in the Hancock Park neighborhood of Los Angeles and left behind two sons, Jonathan and Robert Weedman. Knight discovered his daughter a day later, and this is believed to have contributed to the stroke that ultimately ended his life. His widow, Virginia, never remarried; she died at age 92 on November 29, 2010.

Goodwin Knight's funeral took place in Saint James Episcopal Church in Los Angeles, with full military honors. The funeral was attended by then California Governor Ronald Reagan, U.S. Senator Barry Goldwater from Arizona, accompanied by his son, U.S. Representative Barry Goldwater Jr. from California, General of the Army Omar Bradley and numerous Hollywood and civic leaders. Knight was initially interred at Hollywood Memorial Park Cemetery, but one year later disinterred and his remains moved to Rose Hills Memorial Park in Whittier, California after his second wife, Virginia Knight, learned he had purchased a crypt next to his first wife, Arvilla.

== See also ==
- Burton Abbott
- Barbara Graham

Party political offices
Preceded by Earl Warren	Republican nominee for Governor of California; 1954	Succeeded by William F. Knowland
Preceded by William F. Knowland	Republican nominee for U.S. Senator from California (Class 1); 1958	Succeeded by George Murphy
Political offices
Preceded by Frederick F. Houser	Lieutenant Governor of California; 1947–1953	Succeeded by Harold J. Powers
Preceded by Earl Warren	Governor of California; 1953–1959	Succeeded by Pat Brown
