= Clair Engle =

American politician (1911–1964)

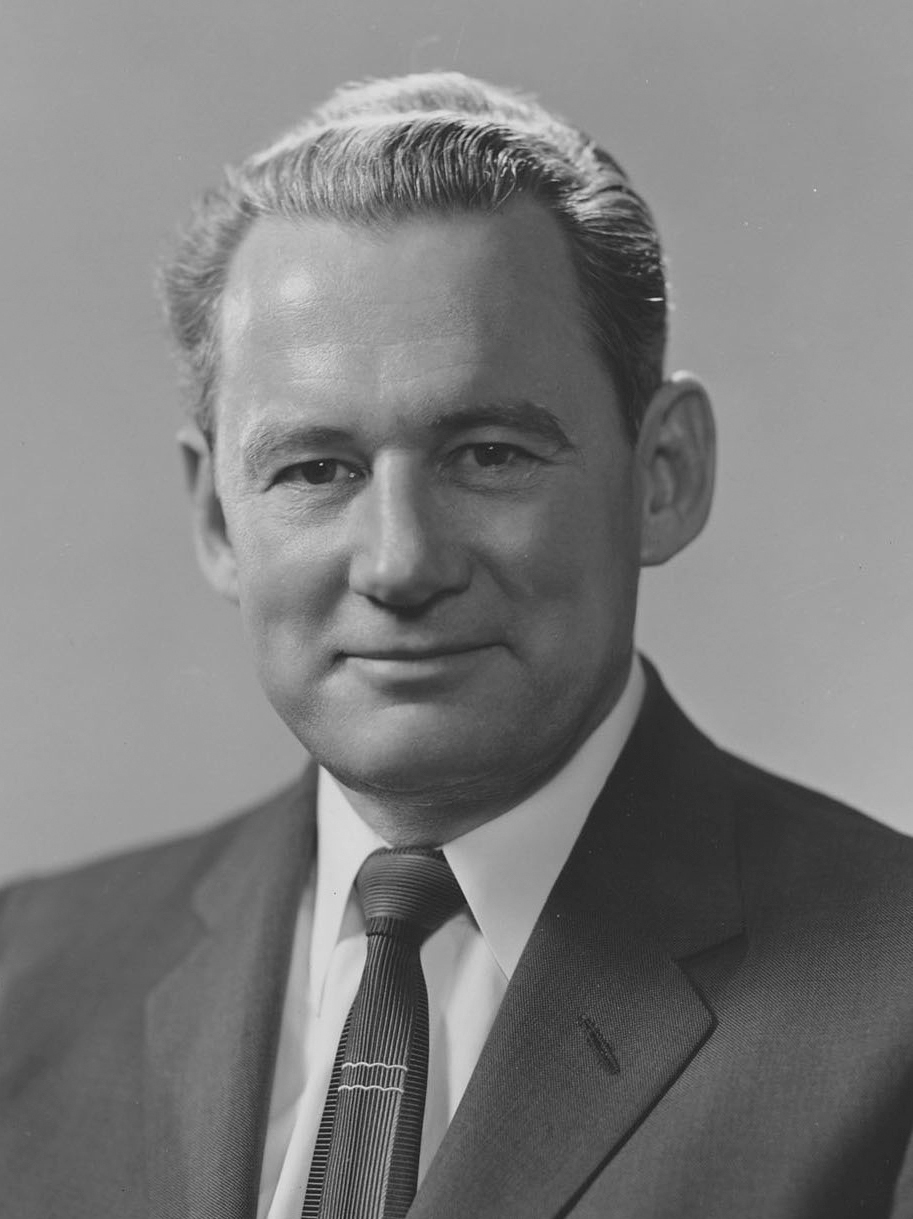

United States Senator from California
- In office January 3, 1959 – July 30, 1964
- Preceded by: William Knowland
- Succeeded by: Pierre Salinger

Member of the U.S. House of Representatives from California's 2nd district
- In office August 31, 1943 – January 3, 1959
- Preceded by: Harry L. Englebright
- Succeeded by: Harold T. Johnson

Member of the California State Senate from the 8th district
- In office January 4, 1943 – August 31, 1943
- Preceded by: D. Jack Metzger
- Succeeded by: Louis G. Sutton

District Attorney of Tehama County
- In office 1934–1942
- Preceded by: M. J. Cheatham
- Succeeded by: Arthur H. Ludeman

Personal details
- Born: September 21, 1911 Bakersfield, California, U.S.
- Died: July 30, 1964 (aged 52) Washington, D.C., U.S.
- Resting place: Oak Hill Cemetery, Red Bluff, California
- Party: Democratic
- Education: California State University, Chico; University of California Hastings College of the Law

Clair Engle (September 21, 1911 – July 30, 1964) was an American politician who served as a United States senator from California from 1959 until his death in 1964. A member of the Democratic Party, he is best remembered for participating in the vote breaking the filibuster of the Civil Rights Act of 1964 in the U.S. Senate while partially paralyzed and unable to speak, shortly before his death from a brain tumor. Engle previously served in the California State Senate from January to August 1943 and in the U.S. House of Representatives from August 1943 until January 1959.

== Early life ==
Engle was born in Bakersfield, California, to Fred Engle, a rancher who had been a teacher and a lawyer, and his wife, Carita. His parents named him after his aunt, who had assisted in his birth, and his name would become the source of many folksy stories over the years.

Like his two brothers, he was active in outdoor activities and attended public schools in Shasta and Tehama counties. His fellow students at Red Bluff High School elected him their student body president.

In 1928, he enrolled at Chico State Teachers College, and he graduated in 1930. He then attended University of California Hastings College of the Law, and graduated in 1933. Although Engle had a reputation for straight-laced religiosity at both institutions, he eloped to marry his first wife, Hazel. They divorced in 1948 and Engle married his second wife, Lucretia Caldwell, a congressional secretary from San Jose.

== Early career ==
Admitted to the California bar in 1933, Engle set up a practice in Corning and soon ran for District Attorney of Tehama County. Just 23 years old at the time of his victory, he would hold that office from 1934 to 1942.

In 1942, he won election to the California Senate, representing Tehama, Glenn and Colusa counties but ended up serving in that body for little more than a few months. His main accomplishment was passing a law to allow the conversion of unused fairgrounds in order to house migrant farmworkers and ease a severe labor shortage.

== U.S. Representative ==
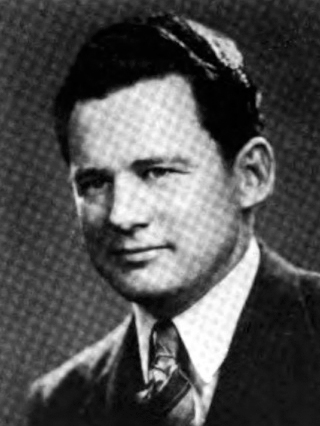
Engle as a U.S. Representative in 1950

On August 31, 1943, Engle was elected as a Democrat to represent California's 2nd congressional district in the 78th Congress to fill the vacancy caused by the death of Harry Lane Englebright. Although the district had more Republican than Democratic voters, Englebright's widow and another candidate split the Republican vote.

Engle was elected to a full term in 1944 and re-elected to the following six Congresses, serving until January 3, 1959. At that time, the district consisted of 18 counties in northern California, and only the district in Nevada was physically larger. Thus, Engle used his pilot's license to campaign and meet with constituents. He was dubbed the "flying congressman" and once flew solo to his home in California from the Hybla Valley Airport in Alexandria, Virginia.

He was sometimes jokingly referred to as "Congressman Fireball" because of his activity, his colorful language, the location of the geologically active Mount Lassen in his district, and the clouds of smoke from his cigars.

In the U.S. House of Representatives he became Chairman of the U.S. House Committee on War Claims for the 79th Congress and Chairman of the U.S. House Committee on Interior and Insular Affairs for the 84th Congress and the 85th Congress.

He sponsored several major expansions of the California Central Valley Project as well as the Saline Water Conversion Research Program, and a low-interest loan program relating to small irrigation projects. He also became known as a key supporter of the Taft–Hartley Act, which did not prevent him from being nominated by both parties when he sought re-election.

== U.S. Senator ==
Engle won election as a Democrat to the U.S. Senate in the 1958, the year of a Democratic landslide. He defeated the incumbent governor Goodwin J. Knight, thus becoming the first Democrat elected to that Senate seat in the 20th century. He succeeded William F. Knowland, who had given up the seat in an unsuccessful run for governor, losing to Pat Brown.

Engle began his term on January 3, 1959. He worked with Senator Thomas Kuchel to pass the San Luis water project, the West Coast electric power intertie and the Point Reyes National Seashore. Engle also promoted federal public transit assistance and civil rights legislation to assist his urban constituents.

=== Declining health ===
On August 24, 1963, Engle underwent surgery to remove a brain tumor, which left him partially paralyzed, forcing him to miss several Senate sessions, and he ultimately withdrew from his re-election campaign. On April 13, 1964, the gravity of Engle's health problems was evident as he attempted to introduce a resolution calling for a delay in constructing the Bodega Bay Nuclear Power Plant at Bodega Head, located in Sonoma County. He was given permission to speak, but was unable to do so; a colleague presented the resolution instead. Engle did not return to the Senate floor for nearly two months.

Engle officially ended his re-election campaign on April 28, 1964, just four days after undergoing his second brain operation in eight months. He chose not to endorse either of his Democratic challengers, California State Controller Alan Cranston or former presidential press secretary Pierre Salinger. That decision came because state Democratic leaders had refused to endorse him unless he provided details concerning his health.

On June 10, 1964, during the roll call for the historic, successful effort to break the filibuster on what would become the Civil Rights Act of 1964, when the clerk reached "Mr. Engle", there was no reply. The tumor had robbed Engle of his ability to speak. Slowly lifting an arm, he pointed to his eye, thereby signaling his affirmative vote ("aye"). The cloture vote was 71–29, four votes more than the two thirds required to end the filibuster. Nine days later, the Senate approved the Act itself.

== Death and legacy ==
Engle died in Washington, D.C., a month and a half later, aged 52. He was survived by his parents, his wife and his daughter from his first marriage, Yvonne Engle Childs. The Senate Chaplain led the memorial service at Fort Myer, Virginia, which Chief Justice Earl Warren attended. Approximately 3,000 mourners attended his funeral in Red Bluff at the First Methodist Church. He was buried in Oak Hill Cemetery.

Trinity Lake, in California's Trinity County, was renamed for him, but the name Trinity Lake continued to be commonly used; eventually, the lake's original name was officially restored. The city of Shasta Lake named a park and community center after him. His papers are held in the library at California State University, Chico.

== Electoral history ==
Clair Engle electoral history

August 31, 1943 special election
Party	Candidate	Votes	%
Democratic	Clair Engle	1,721	53.3
Republican	Grace Engelbright	1,304	40.40
Republican	Jesse M. Mayo	203	6.3
Total votes		3,228	100.0
Turnout			
Democratic gain from Republican			

1944 United States House of Representatives elections in California, 2nd district
Party	Candidate	Votes	%
Democratic	Clair Engle (incumbent)	48,201	63.8
Republican	Jesse M. Mayo	27,312	36.2
Total votes		75,513	100.0
Turnout			
Democratic hold			

1946 United States House of Representatives elections in California, 2nd district
Party	Candidate	Votes	%
Democratic	Clair Engle (incumbent)	57,895	100.0
Turnout			
Democratic hold			

1948 United States House of Representatives elections in California, 2nd district
Party	Candidate	Votes	%
Democratic	Clair Engle (incumbent)	78,555	100.0
Turnout			
Democratic hold			

1950 United States House of Representatives elections in California, 2nd district
Party	Candidate	Votes	%
Democratic	Clair Engle (incumbent)	85,103	100.0
Turnout			
Democratic hold			

1952 United States House of Representatives elections in California, 2nd district
Party	Candidate	Votes	%
Democratic	Clair Engle (incumbent)	124,179	100.0
Turnout			
Democratic hold			

1954 United States House of Representatives elections in California, 2nd district
Party	Candidate	Votes	%
Democratic	Clair Engle (incumbent)	113,104	100.0
Turnout			
Democratic hold			

1956 United States House of Representatives elections in California, 2nd district
Party	Candidate	Votes	%
Democratic	Clair Engle (incumbent)	136,544	100.0
Turnout			
Democratic hold			

California U.S. Senate general election 1958
Party	Candidate	Votes	%
Democratic	Clair Engle	2,927,693	57.01
Republican	Goodwin Knight	2,204,337	42.93
Write-In	Jesse M. Ritchie	892	0.02
Write-In	Ray B. Pollard	281	0.01
None	Scattering	2,018	0.04
Majority		723,356	14.08
Turnout		5,135,221	
Democratic gain from Republican			

== See also ==
- List of notable brain tumor patients
- List of members of the United States Congress who died in office (1950–1999)

U.S. House of Representatives
Preceded by Harry Lane Englebright	Member of the U.S. House of Representatives from California's 2nd congressional district 1943–1959	Succeeded by Harold T. Johnson
U.S. Senate
Preceded by William F. Knowland	U.S. senator (Class 1) from California; 1959 – 1964; Served alongside: Thomas Kuchel	Succeeded by Pierre Salinger
Preceded by Arthur L. Miller; Nebraska	Chair of the House Committee on Interior and Insular Affairs; 1955–1959	Succeeded by James A. Haley; Florida
Party political offices
Preceded by William F. Knowland	Democratic nominee for U.S. Senator from California (Class 1); 1958	Succeeded by Pierre Salinger
