= 1938 California Attorney General election =

- November 8, 1938
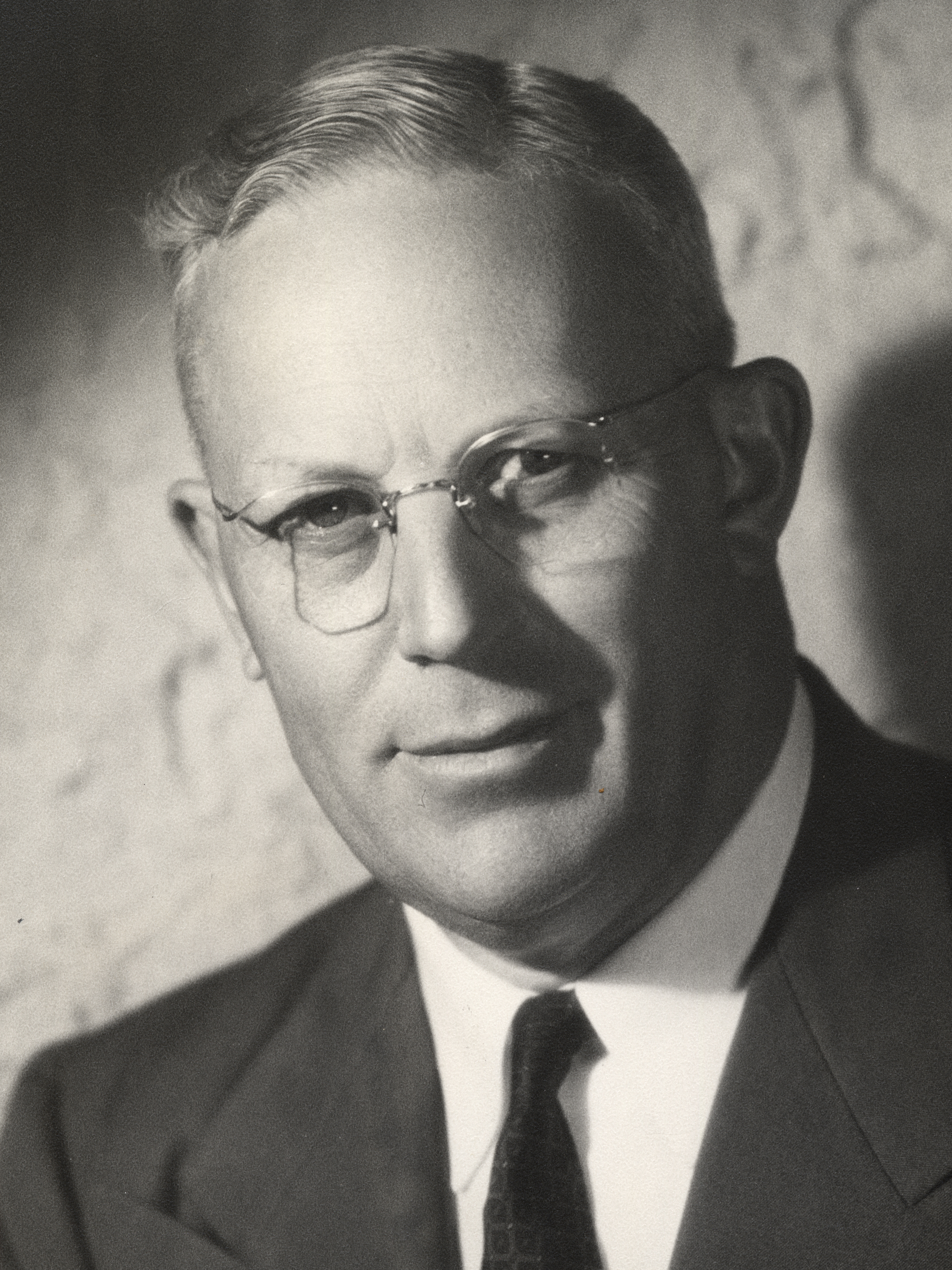

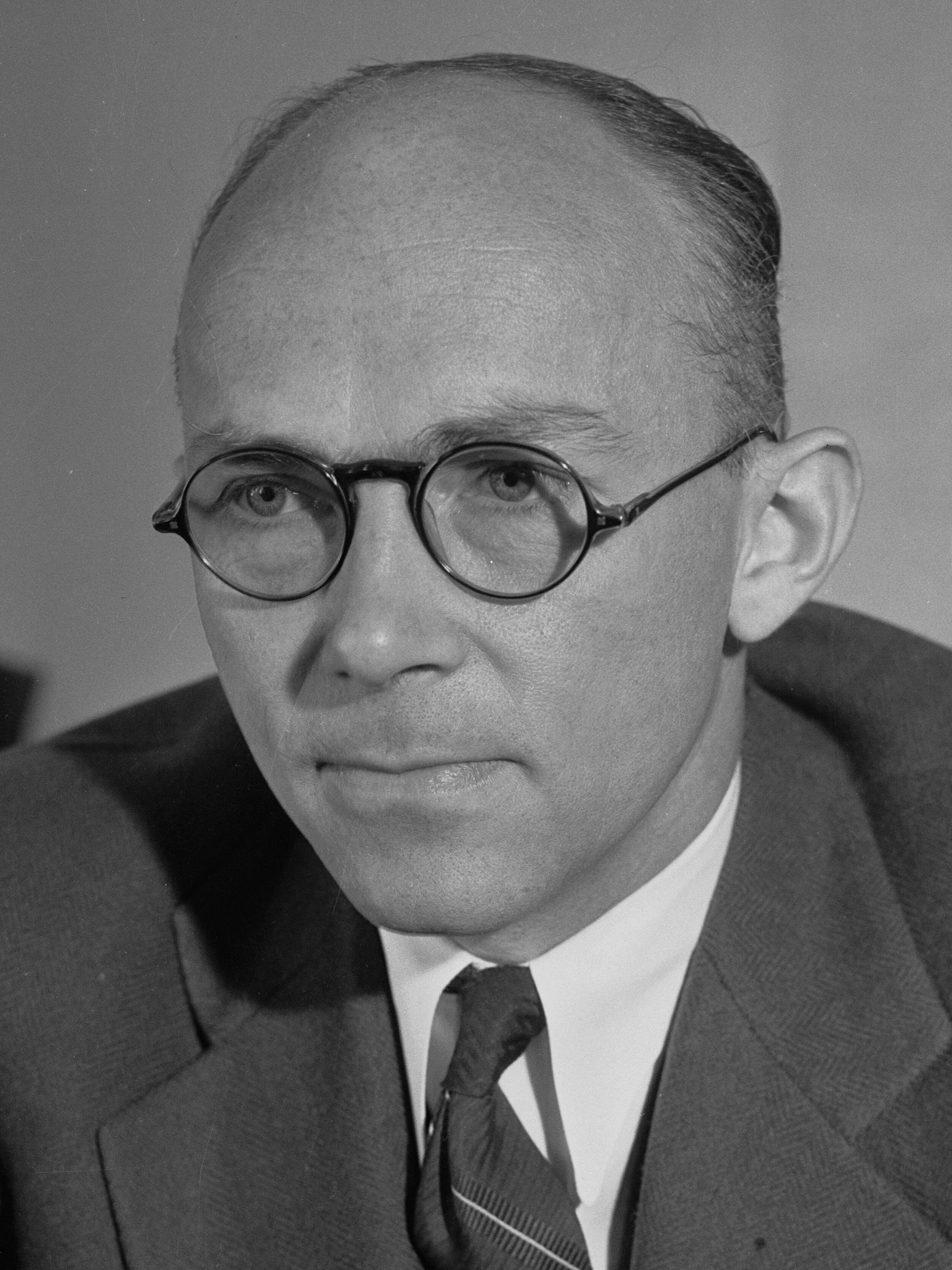

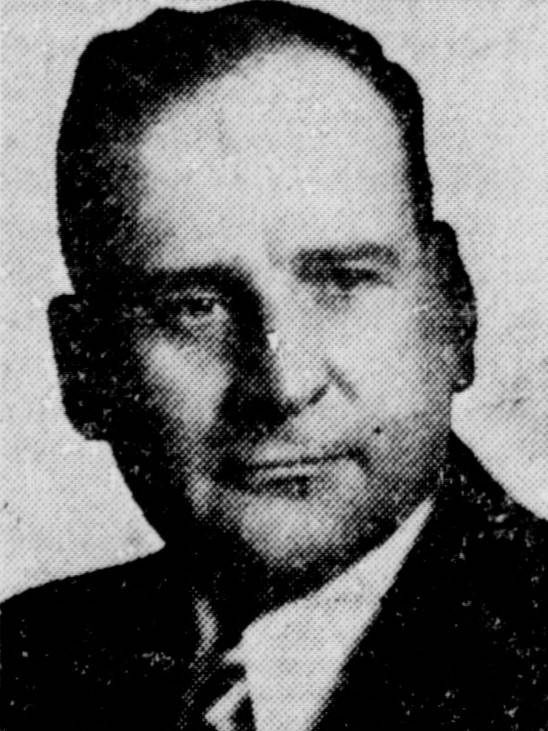
Nominee	Earl Warren	Carl Kegley	Walter Emmett Barry
Party	Republican	Write-in	Townsend
Alliance	Democratic; Progressive
Popular vote	1,542,847	463,682	231,914
Percentage	66.16%	19.88%	9.95%
- County results Warren: 50-60% 60-70% 70-80% 80-90%
Attorney General before election
Ulysses S. Webb
Republican
Elected Attorney General
Earl Warren
Republican

The 1938 California Attorney General election was held on November 8, 1938. Republican Alameda County District Attorney Earl Warren defeated Democratic write-in candidate Carl S. Kegley and Townsend Party nominee Walter Emmett Barry with 66.16% of the vote.

== Primary election results ==
Primary elections were held on August 30, 1938.

=== Candidates ===
- Earl Warren (R), Alameda County District Attorney
- Lorrin Andrews (R), former Attorney General of Hawaii
- Carl S. Kegley (D), attorney and Ham and Eggs advocate
- William Moseley Jones (D), Speaker of the California State Assembly
- Patrick J. Cooney (D)
- James F. Brennan (D), State Assemblyman
- Walter Emmett Barry (Townsend)
- William C. Ring (Progressive)
- Claude A. Watson (Prohibition)

=== Results ===
Republican primary results
Party	Candidate	Votes	%
Republican	Earl Warren	533,534	84.00%
Republican	Lorrin Andrews	78,942	12.43%
Democratic	Carl S. Kegley (write-in)	22,708	3.58%
Total votes		635,184	100.00%

Democratic primary results
Party	Candidate	Votes	%
Republican	Earl Warren	308,590	30.17%
Democratic	Carl S. Kegley	280,408	27.41%
Democratic	William Moseley Jones	169,521	16.57%
Democratic	Patrick J. Cooney	124,151	12.14%
Democratic	James F. Brennan	62,505	6.11%
Democratic	Walter Emmett Barry	50,571	4.94%
Democratic	Lorrin Andrews	27,099	2.65%
Total votes		1,022,845	100.00%

Progressive primary results
Party	Candidate	Votes	%
California Progressive Party	Earl Warren	3,588	65.99%
California Progressive Party	William C. Ring	1,026	18.87%
California Progressive Party	Lorrin Andrews	823	15.14%
Total votes		5,437	100.00%

Townsend primary results
Party	Candidate	Votes	%
Townsend Party	Walter Emmett Barry	7,051	60.32%
Townsend Party	Carl S. Kegley (write-in)	2,646	22.64%
Townsend Party	Lorrin Andrews	1,992	17.04%
Total votes		11,689	100.00%

== General election ==
=== Candidates ===
- Earl Warren, Republican
- Carl S. Kegley, write-in
- Walter Emmett Barry, Townsend
- Claude A. Watson, Prohibition

=== Results ===
1938 California Attorney General election
Party	Candidate	Votes	%	±%
Republican	Earl Warren	1,542,847	66.16%	
Write-in	Carl Kegley	463,682	19.88%	
Townsend Party	Walter Emmett Barry	231,914	9.95%	
Prohibition	Claude A. Watson	93,085	3.99%	
Scattering		357	0.01%	
Majority		2,331,885		
Turnout				
Republican hold		Swing		
