= Robert W. Kenny =

American lawyer, judge and activist (1901-1976)

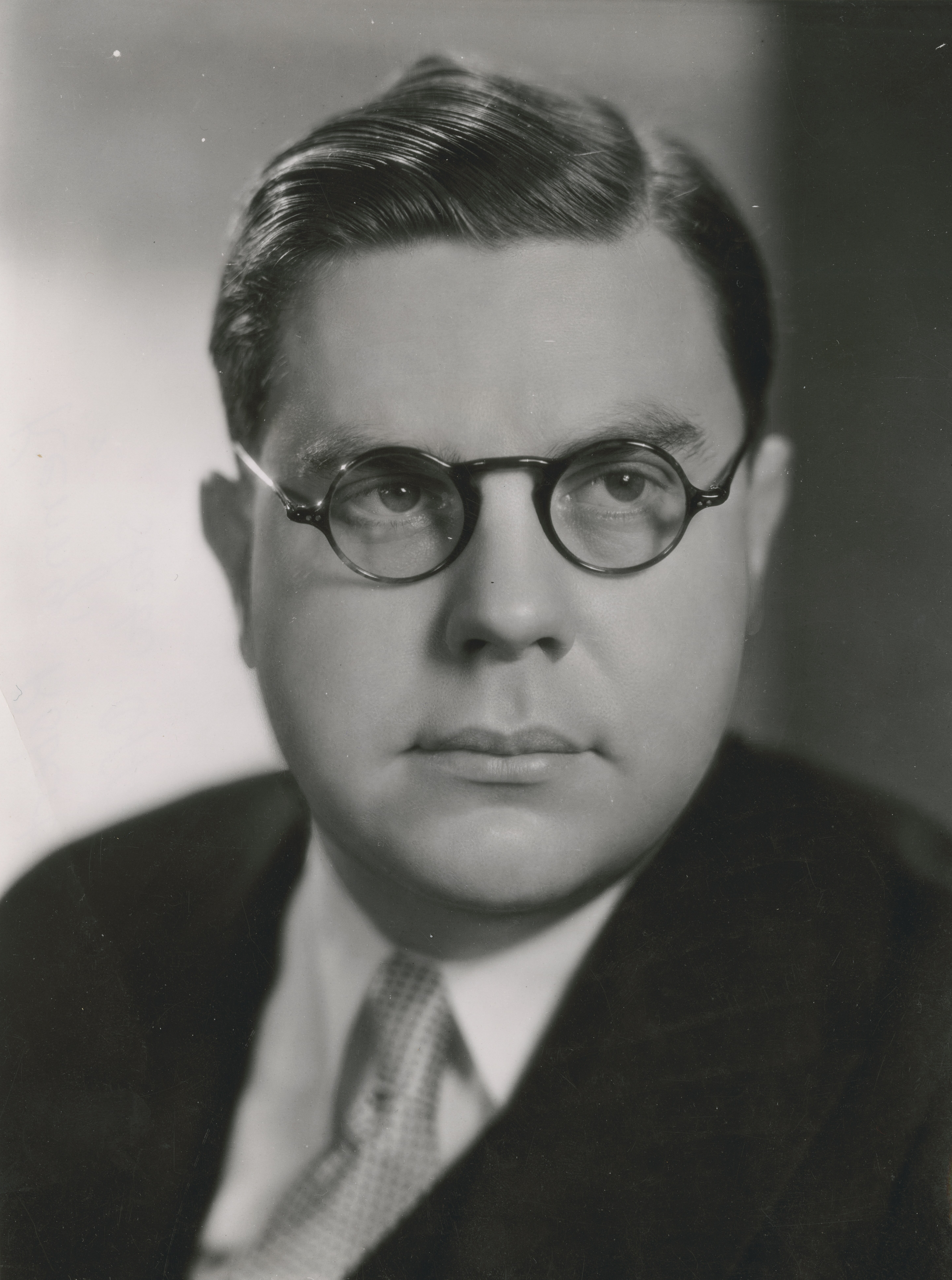
- Kenny c. 1938

21st Attorney General of California
- In office January 4, 1943 – January 5, 1947
- Governor: Earl Warren
- Preceded by: Earl Warren
- Succeeded by: Frederick N. Howser

Member of the California Senate from the 38th district
- In office January 2, 1939 – January 4, 1943
- Preceded by: Culbert Olson
- Succeeded by: Jack Tenney

Judge of the Los Angeles County Superior Court
- In office November 29, 1966 – February 1, 1975
- Appointed by: Pat Brown
- Preceded by: John W. Preston
- Succeeded by: Raymond Cardenas
- In office December 3, 1932 – January 2, 1939
- Appointed by: James Rolph
- Preceded by: Clair S. Tappaan
- Succeeded by: John Beardsley

Judge of the Los Angeles Municipal Court
- In office September 14, 1931 – December 3, 1932
- Appointed by: James Rolph
- Preceded by: Arthur Crum
- Succeeded by: William M. Northrup

Personal details
- Born: August 21, 1901 Los Angeles, California, U.S.
- Died: July 20, 1976 (aged 74) La Jolla, California, U.S.
- Party: Republican (before 1938); Democratic (after 1938)
- Other political affiliations: Progressive (1948)
- Spouse: Sara B. McCann (m. 1922; div. 1938)
- Education: Stanford University

Robert Walker Kenny (August 21, 1901 – July 20, 1976) was an American attorney and politician who served as the 21st Attorney General of California from 1943 to 1947. Kenny was "a colorful figure in state politics for many years", who in 1946 ran unsuccessfully against Earl Warren for state governor (a race in which Warren won both Republican and Democratic nominations).

During World War II, Kenny was an active proponent of the incarceration of Japanese Americans, which the California Attorney General's office has since apologized for, describing it as a "failure of political leadership" and a racist policy. In 1947, he led the legal defense of the Hollywood Ten.

== Background ==
Robert Walker Kenny was born on August 21, 1901, in Los Angeles, California. His mother was Minnie Summerfield. His father, Robert Wolfenden Kenny (1863-1914) was a successful banker and civic leader in Los Angeles and Berkeley, California. Kenny's grandfather, George L. Kenny, arrived in San Francisco in the early 1850s with his friends, the brothers A.L. Bancroft and Hubert Howe Bancroft. The three men formed a partnership and established the first bookstore in San Francisco. In 1921, Kenny graduated at 18 from Stanford University.

== Career ==
=== Press ===
In 1921, Kenny joined the Los Angeles Times, where he worked with Chapin Hall, and eventually became a financial editor there. In 1922, he joined United Press news service. Next, he worked for the Chicago Tribune in Paris. In 1923, he returned to Los Angeles and worked for United News. He then opened his own press service with Ted Taylor, called the Los Angeles Press Service, while also working for the Los Angeles Express newspaper. After studying law privately, he passed a civil service examination in 1926 and was admitted to the state bar.

=== California government service ===
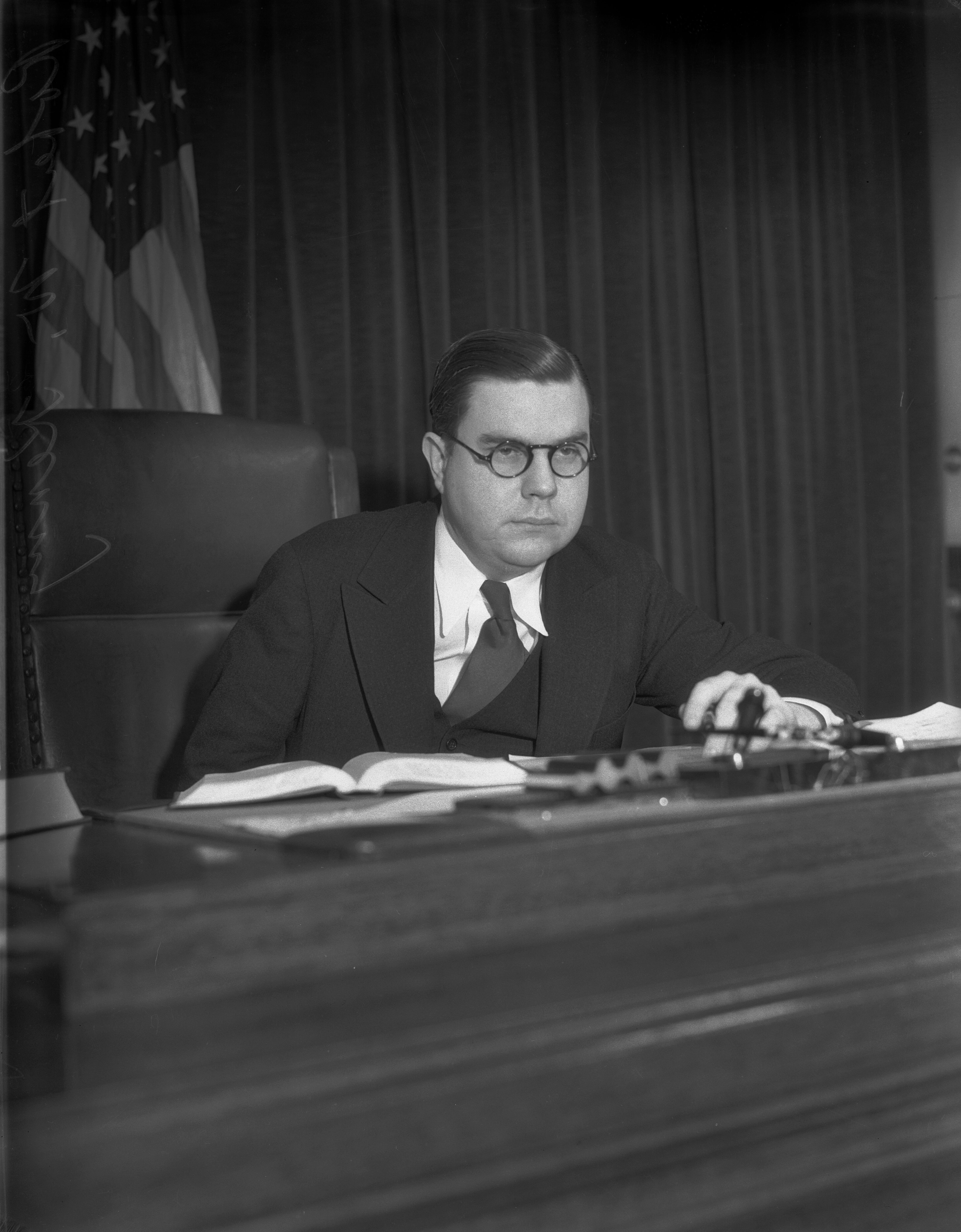
Judge Kenny in court c. 1931–1939

In 1927, Kenny began working in the Los Angeles County counsel's office as "Deputy of the County Counsel". In 1930, he supported James Rolph Jr., who became California governor. Kenny received an appointment as judge to the L.A. Municipal Court, followed by promotion to the L.A. Superior Court. In 1934, Kenny won an election and became municipal judge for small claims court. He then became a judge in the law and motion court. He served in the California State Senate from 1939 to 1943.

At the outset of the 1930s, Kenny was characterized as "a liberal young Republican with Prohibition repeal as his main issue". Sometime during the decade, he switched party affiliation and aligned himself with the Democrats.

=== Private practice ===
In 1939, Kenny resigned his post as municipal judge, and also dissolved his law partnership with Paul Vallee and Lawrence Beilensen. He set up a new partnership with Morris E. Cohen, which lasted until 1948. Robert O. Curran joined the firm but left to fight in World War II; Robert S. Morris replaced him.

Clients included William Schneiderman, head of the California section of the Communist Party USA; Kenny helped him with citizenship papers in 1940, a case he lost but which Wendell Willkie helped win on appeal in 1943.

=== Attorney General of California ===
In 1942, Kenny was elected Attorney General of California, beating Louis H. Burke, and served one term to 1947. Under Kenny in this period, Robert B. Powers worked as "coordinator of law enforcement agencies".

While in this capacity, Kenny was responsible for the office's complicity in the racist incarceration of Japanese Americans. His actions have been disavowed as a failure of leadership and unjust by his successors.

In 1946, Kenny sought the Democratic nomination for Governor, but was defeated by Earl Warren. Although Warren was a Republican, California law at that time permitted a candidate to run in both primaries, a practice known as cross-filing. Warren also won the Republican nomination that year and went on to score an easy general election victory.

=== NLG, Hollywood Ten, and HUAC ===
In 1937, Kenny supported Franklin Delano Roosevelt's battle to "pack" the United States Supreme Court with extra justices via the Judicial Procedures Reform Bill of 1937. As The New York Times wrote in Kenny's obituary: "Out of that battle grew the National Lawyers Guild" (NLG).

On February 22, 1937, when the NLG formed, Kenny was a founding member. (Note: he was also a member of the NLG's predecessor, the International Juridical Association.) He was elected president of the NLG in 1940 and held the post till 1948. During his tenure as president, he became involved in the aftermath of the Zoot Suit Riots.

In May 1945, while serving as Attorney General, Kenny accompanied Bartley Crum and Martin Popper to the founding session of the United Nations in San Francisco, where the three men were NLG's official consultants to the American delegation at the behest of the U.S. Department of State. In 1946, after losing California's Democratic gubernatorial primary, Kenny returned to private practice.

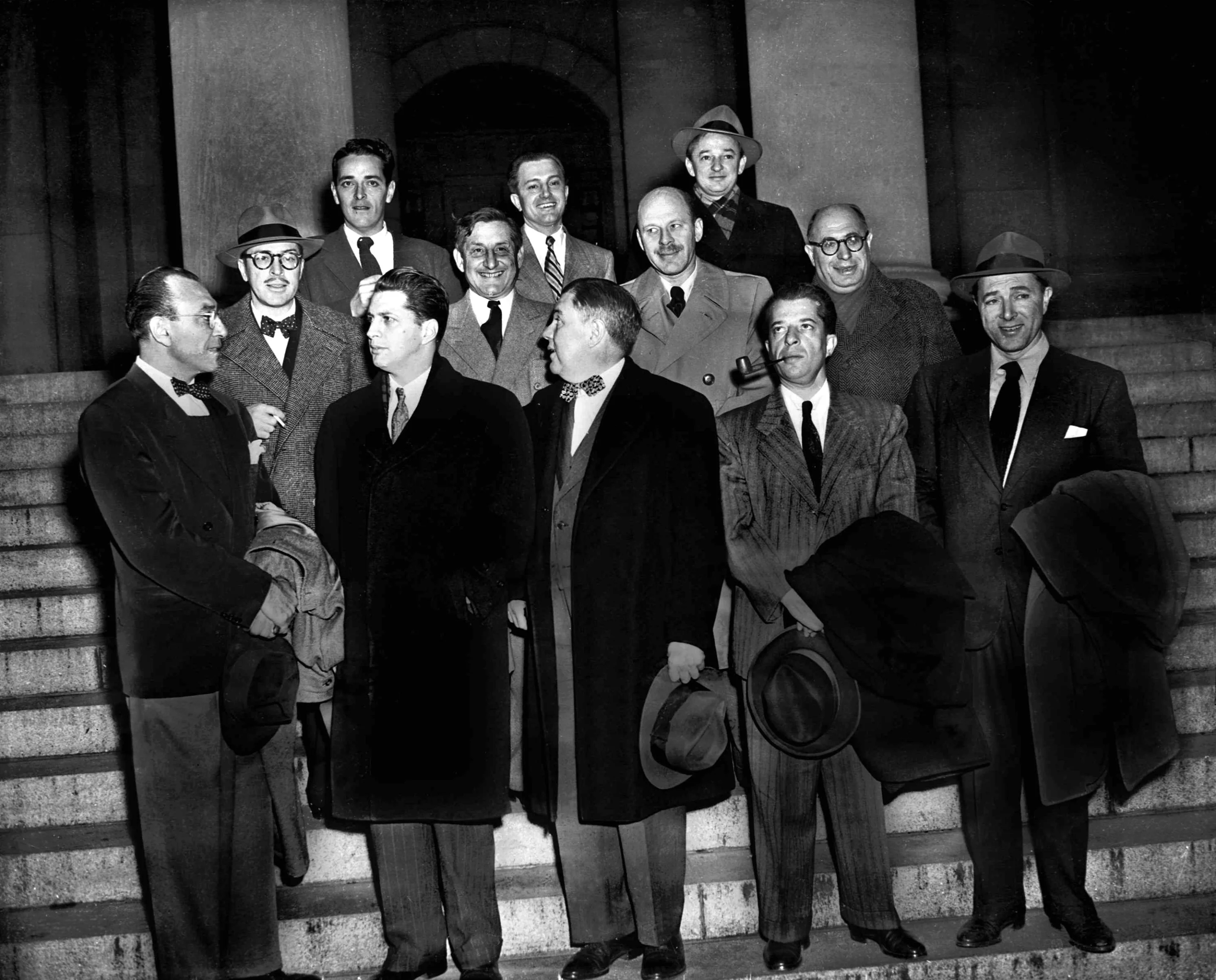
"The Hollywood Ten" stand with their attorneys outside district court in Washington, D.C. before arraignment on contempt of Congress charges. The ten were charged for refusing to cooperate with the House Un-American Activities Committee. (Front row, L-R): Herbert Biberman, attorney Martin Popper, attorney Robert W. Kenny, Albert Maltz and Lester Cole. (Second row, L-R): Dalton Trumbo, John Howard Lawson, Alvah Bessie and Samuel Ornitz. (Top row, L-R): Ring Lardner Jr., Edward Dmytryk and Adrian Scott.

In 1947, NLG members Charles Katz and Ben Margolis asked Kenny to become lead counsel, with Crum as his second, for the "Unfriendly Nineteen" film industry professionals subpoenaed to testify before the House Un-American Activities Committee (HUAC). Later, NLG members Martin Popper of Washington and constitutional lawyer Sam Rosenwein of New York also joined the legal team. Only ten of the nineteen wound up testifying before the HUAC. They all refused to answer questions about their Communist Party affiliation, and were cited for contempt of Congress. They became known as the Hollywood Ten.

Some believe that Kenny's decision to defend the Hollywood Ten may well have dashed any aspirations he had for career advancement. In her review of Janet Stevenson's 1980 biography of Kenny, The Undiminished Man, Dorothy Gray writes:

Until Bob Kenny chose to oppose the outrages of the McCarthy era, it appeared as though he would achieve a high political office or gain appointment to the California Supreme Court. When, in the late 1940's, he chose to defend those accused of being pro-communist, he sacrificed all hope of high office and became a political untouchable.

=== Later life ===
In 1948, Kenny and Robert S. Morris formed a new law partnership. In the 1940s and 1950s, they represented "many people under indictment for questionable activities." Clients included Luisa Moreno Bemis, Guatemalan labor activist, many "unfriendly" witnesses (including the Hollywood Ten) before HUAC in Los Angeles in 1952, as well as musicians before HUAC in 1956. Kenny was a member of the American Committee for the Protection of Foreign Born. Partner Robert S. Morris was a member of the Immigration and Deportation Committee in the Los Angeles chapter of the American Civil Liberties Union (ACLU).

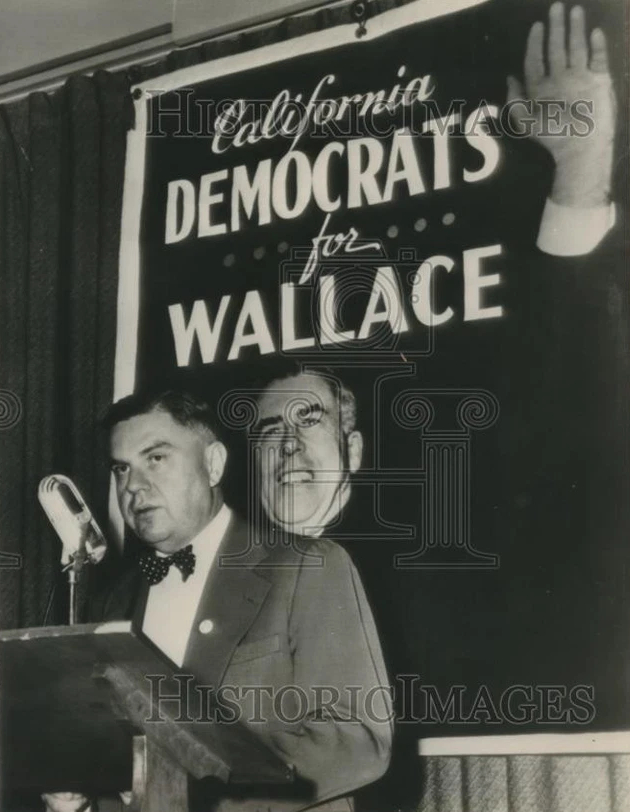
Kenny speaks at a Democrats for Wallace meeting in Fresno, July 19, 1947

In 1948, Kenny supported former Vice President Henry A. Wallace for President over incumbent Harry S. Truman, who Kenny believed had "betrayed the principles of the Democratic Party." He served as chairman of the Progressive Citizens of America and "Democrats for Wallace."

In 1950, Kenny ran for California state senator against Glenn Anderson and Jack Tenney for the Democratic nomination; Tenney won. The same year, he ran for Los Angeles mayor in a recall election; Fletcher Bowron won. In 1957, he was one of the lawyers who helped 23 Hollywood screenwriters and actors win a Supreme Court review of their challenge of the Hollywood blacklist. In 1960, Kenny was treasurer of the National Committee to Abolish the House Un-American Activities Committee (NCA-HUAC). In 1962, Kenny served as counsel of Albert J. Lewis and Steve Roberts of the Fair Play for Cuba Committee before HUAC.

In 1963, the Congressional Record re-recorded information from October 26, 1955, that "public records, files, and publications of this committee" (HUAC) showed Kenny "not necessarily a Communist, a Communist sympathizer, or a fellow traveller" but noted nevertheless that he was affiliated with the American Youth for Democracy, Civil Rights Congress, Joint Anti-Fascist Refugee Committee, and California Labor School. In 1966, California Governor Edmund G. Brown appointed Kenny again a state judge. In 1975, he retired from the bench.

== Personal life and death ==
In 1922, Kenny married Sara McCann; she died in 1966.

Robert Walter Kenny died at age 74 on July 20, 1976, at Scripps Memorial Hospital in La Jolla, California.

== Legacy ==
In 2012, the National Lawyers Guild remembered Kenny as follows:

That the Guild survived the splits in the late '30s and repression of the '50s is primarily a testament to the loyalty, bravery and commitment to principle of two allied but disparate groups. One was made up of communist and socialist activists... The other was a group of dedicated civil libertarians who were unwilling to compromise their principles to curry favor with either the Roosevelt Administration or the Truman and Eisenhower Administrations. Nor would they refuse to work with Communists. But these lawyers were not communists, and steered the Guild in an independent, radical direction. Robert W Kenny, a California State Senator who became President of the Guild in 1940 at a moment of grave internal crisis, disregarding the risks to his political future, and remaining President for eight important years, was a key member of this group.

== Works ==
- The Law of Freedom in a Platform by Gerrard Winstanley, edited by Robert W. Kenny (1973)

== See also ==
- California Attorney General
- National Lawyers Guild
- Hollywood blacklist
- Hollywood Ten
- Bartley Crum
- William Schneiderman
