= Robert B. Powers =

American police officer

- Born: October 3, 1900; Las Vegas, New Mexico, US
- Died: December 3, 1976 (aged 76); Oklahoma City, Oklahoma, US
- Police career
- Department: New Jersey State Police, Bakersfield Police Department
- Service years: 1922–1923 (New Jersey State Police), 1928–1945 (Bakersfield Police Department)
- Rank: Chief of Bakersfield Police Department 1933–1945
- Other work: race relations, freelance writer

Robert B. Powers, (October 3, 1900 – December 3, 1976) was a prominent police officer in the history of California, first as Chief of Police in Bakersfield, California (1933–1945) and as the chief enforcement officer at the state level (1944–1947) during which he co-established one of the earliest training programs for police in matters of race relations.

== Biography ==
=== Birth and youth ===
Robert "Bob" Boyd Powers was born October 3, 1900, in Las Vegas, New Mexico. He was the second eldest son of Stephen and M. Powers, themselves both born in Kentucky. By 1910 he had an elder brother Joshua, two elder sisters and three younger sisters. All the siblings were born in New Mexico. Father Stephen had been born around 1866 in Hawesville, Kentucky. His grandfather had many years of service as a soldier, lawyer, and banker in Kentucky. Through his grandfather Powers is kin to Tom Powers and Hiram Powers. Stephen Powers did not serve in the Civil War, though the state sided with the Union, and the family has traces back to Ireland before 1771.

Powers dropped out of school in the fifth grade. Somewhat charmed at the romantic stories of Lawrence of Arabia and military service, he enlisted in military service at 17 years old and was assigned to the 12th Cavalry Regiment. He worked as a personnel sergeant in 1920, and the US Census had his as a soldier at Camp Furlong near Luna, New Mexico. He later worked as a clerk in the office of the chief of cavalry in Washington, D.C. until 1922. After being discharged, he served as a state trooper and corporal in New Jersey into 1923. His grandfather died in Louisville, Kentucky, that year. Powers quit that job after hoping for advancement but working for an oil company to February 1924 was not it. Neither was re-enlisting as he found after a few months in 1924 at Fort Slocum (New York). He then worked as a railroad "special agent" protecting trains and added time as a deputy sheriff in New Mexico and Arizona.

=== Bakersfield police force ===
Powers was hired as a motorcycle patrolman in January 1928 for the Bakersfield Police Department though his actual work initially was as a stenographer. And he married Mildred Irwin, daughter of a former district attorney, December 1928.

Because of his training as a solo officer earlier he made a reputation of solo achievements in the force and was promoted to sergeant in 1930. In the US Census had the Powers family of Robert and Mildred living on 19th St, Bakersfield renting a home paying $30/mth (about $470/mth in 2021 dollars), listed as a traffic officer. He developed an interest in traffic patrolling and management of security for schools. In 1931 he became a lieutenant, and later Chief of police of the Bakersfield police force in 1933. He also undertook professional training at the University of California, Los Angeles police school, the FBI school in Monterey and the FBI Academy in Quantico, Virginia.

The 1940 US Census finds the Powers family of Robert Sr, listed as Chief of Police, wife Mildred, sons Robert Jr and Stephen, and a nurse living with the family on B. Street in Bakersfield where Powers owned the home work $8000 in 1940.(about $150k in 2021 dollars.) The family had lived in the same place in April 1935. His income for 1939 was about $3600 (about $67k in 2021 dollars.)

While police chief, Powers viewed the overall police force across the state as ill-educated, politically connected, and "corrupt" by modern standards. Out of a desire to shore up an independent and capable police force under his authority he began to revise procedures and investigative techniques and at the same time revise local regulation so that the chief's position was under a civil service categorization and thus under the city manager and not directly responsible to the city council. Powers instituted on-the-job training that included public school type curriculum like English classes so that officers would be more enabled to use words instead of weapons, and professional skills like handling fingerprints. He got the police to actually learn the law so that they didn't cause problems for themselves. In April 1944, Powers wrote a "letter to the editor" of the local newspaper about rules of engagement of police - that a policeman has an instant choice of killing someone or not whereas courts can take weeks or months to decide, and thus sometimes lets an apparent criminal escape. In late March his father had died in Coronado.

When he was appointed chief there were 38 houses of prostitution known in the community and only 11 when he left as Chief. Powers was also a strong voice in determining successive chiefs through to 1966. His appointed successor was able to close the remaining 11.

==== Significant actions while Chief ====
===== California Agricultural Strike 1933 =====
Perhaps his first major engagement as chief of police was in the repercussions of the California Agricultural Strike 1933. Under his review the marchers were allowed to take murdered bodies to City Hall to make their protest, noting, (when interviewed in 1970,) "Their motives may have been to turn this country 'Red', but their activities in attempting to get a living wage for the workers were certainly justified."

===== Case of Mathias Warren =====
From May to October 1938 a murder case consumed his time - that of Mathias Warren, father to Earl Warren who was soon to be was Attorney General, then governor, and in time, supreme court justice. On hearing of the murder then district attorney Warren, who had cultivated a relationship with police in various departments and reporters, came to Bakersfield along with many friends seeking to help and there was some tension how the investigation would proceed. Powers insisted and Warren let Powers be in charge. Ultimately no one was charged with the crime - Powers ended up viewing it as a breaking-and-entering that became murder from a transient as Mathias Warren had chosen to live on a messy property while his wealth was tied up in land holdings. Of course the matter was covered in many newspaper stories. However, as time went on the importance of the case, at least to Powers, had more to do with the increasing prominence of Earl Warren. Powers noted the transients of the period were the Okies, indeed The Grapes of Wrath was set in Bakersfield, and that the local establishment tried to keep them pushed out of the way.

===== Women officers =====
In June 1939 Powers took the stance of supporting an initiative to get women on the police force if they were college educated and paid well. It proved difficult to get the right funding with no officers hired by March 1941. However the first was hired by summer 1941 and by the spring of 1942 what women officers and staff should wear was an active area of conversation.

===== Probed by political backlash =====
Powers had run across a local politician taking a bribe and sought prosecution. Through assistance with then attorney general Earl Warren a case was pursued but ended in a hung jury. Powers was himself then put under investigation by the city council and reports on its progress were carried in the newspapers March-to-April 1942. The final judgement was that the case against Powers was politically motivated and he had done no significant wrong. Powers took a leave of absence and for a period in World War II Powers and his lead staff were all enlisted in the Coast Guard from May 1942 to July 1943, ending service as chief gunner's mate, and instructor in gunnery.

=== State Chief ===
Soon after returning to service in Bakersfield Powers was called up for a state level service, taking another leave of absence from Bakersfield. In March 1944 Powers was appointed "coordinator of law enforcement agencies" under California Attorney General Robert W. Kenny's and was called "a sensitive and intelligent man" as wartime state committee on law enforcement under then Governor Earl Warren.

In December 1944 Powers wrote for the committee advising fair treatment of Japanese as the war ended. Powers worked under Kenney on the peaceful return of the Japanese returnees with the War Relocation Authority and aided returning Nisei who had suffered vigilante attacks in August 1945. Powers position was extended after war time in January 1945 and the family moved to Sacramento in February.

==== Race relations ====
In early 1945 Powers was directed to a race relations meeting in Chicago with the new American Council on Race Relations and began an endeavor of learning himself and then promulgating race relations issues across police departments. The first major project of their cooperation then started in Richmond, California with Davis McEntire, in September. Initial efforts were aimed at training the police in human relations including trying to eliminate prejudice and present the unfairness of segregation and discrimination based on race - factors later observed to be widespread needs. The work brought together leaders of the California Department of Corrections, National Association for the Advancement of Colored People, Japanese American Citizens League, and a Nisei, second-generation American of Japanese descent, US Marine. Together the social norms and prejudices of the day were vented, discussed, and broken down across a week of open-ended discussions. Following the training incendiary incidents arose in the community and the police took novel actions ensuring fairness and peace was retained. The Saturday Evening Post covered it in "Cops don't have to be brutal", December 28, 1946. Following this numerous police departments even outside California were informed of the training and a booklet A Guide to Race Relations for Peace Officers was created and distributed, (including excerpts in the Baltimore Afro-American newspaper.) There was a prospective project by the young American Council on Race Relations using it and Kenny and Powers had worked on a documentary film on race relations and police departments but Frederick N. Howser, the next Attorney General, dismissed Powers and the project. Powers had been writing the script, working with Edwin Embree. Out of this Powers was on a short list of leaders in the field though more recent scholarship critiqued the program for not including the local minority leadership of the time.

Powers retired from police service in 1947 over differences with the new administration and was interested in promoting race relations issues.

=== Baháʼí ===
Around December 1946 to April 1947 Powers investigated the Baháʼí Faith while seeking a religious basis for living. He was attracted by the Baháʼí teaching of an unfettered search after truth. The first Baháʼí book he read was This Earth One Country - "When I read the chapter on Islam I accepted Muhammad as a Prophet. When I'd finished the book I was a Baháʼí ..." The book was oriented to the Baháʼí understanding of a view across religions and world peace. It was written by one of the first Jews of Canada to join the religion. This approach was reflected in his essay for the radio program This I Believe by Edward R. Murrow entitled "I stopped carrying a gun" in 1954.

==== Los Angeles ====
Powers first appears publicly presenting the religion in February 1948 giving a talk in Los Angeles Baháʼí Center. That year he also publicly reflected on his career in law enforcement writing two articles for the Saturday Evening Post - a two part series "Crime was my business". In it of his twenty five years in police work he said "It's a long time to last without becoming a cynic" and:

During some of those years I was ridden by fear of being double-crossed out of my job by politicians. Often I dreaded that some situation would catch me unaware and daub me with the yellow mud of a coward's reputation. I worried that I'd lose my temper, go haywire and end up before the grand jury twisting my uniform buttons nervously and begging for mercy. There was the wear and tear of wondering if the chiefs I served under would let me down when I needed to be backed up. And after I got to be chief, there was never a time when someone didn't hate my guts, and I had to be up on my toes to keep my enemies from feathering my back with knives.

He contributed an article in 1948 to volume 11 of the multi-year survey of the status of the religion's community around the world The Baháʼí World entitled An Experiment in Race Relations about his experience in 1945 dealing with race tensions. In 1949 he joined the editorial committee working on volume 12 and continued service in 1950. He gave several talks advertised in the African-American newspaper California Eagle across 1949. Around the same time he served on the Los Angeles Spiritual Assembly, copresented on the religion at the Bahá'í Center, and gave a talk "Religion too is indivisible" for World Religion Day in Fresno, noted as chair of the Teaching Committee of the Western States. In 1950 he cooperated in an effort to integrate a school in Duncan Arizona supporting a local civilian and fellow Baháʼí - Betty Toomis - and then attorney Stewart Udall - and continued to be visible giving talks on the religion in California into 1952. Powers was among the people who received votes to fill the vacancies of the national assembly created by the pioneering of Dorothy Beecher Baker and Matthew W. Bullock, amidst a system that has no electioneering.

Around these activities Powers was called upon by the State Assembly Committee on Crime and Correction to investigate a situation in Oakland that suggested police brutality in confronting communists and black-power protestors - issues that continued into the Berkeley riots (1960s). Powers found evidence that convinced him there were several murders by police being pushed into confrontations by leadership. He found the whole situation evil and hurt him physically to confront.

In the period Powers' son, Robert Jr, was in the military and was stationed in Guam from about May 1953 into 1956 and was accorded the title Knight of Baháʼu'lláh for his service to the religion while there.

==== Arizona ====
The Powers were listed as homefront pioneers for Yuma, Arizona, in early 1954. Powers and son Stephen were visible in September 1956 in a Baháʼí youth group in Tucson and in December 1959 he attended the Arizona state Baháʼí convention coming from Flagstaff. Powers suffered a stroke about 1960 but he was soon visible living in Yuma and giving a talk on the religion in April 1961 and 1962.

==== Bakersfield ====
The first known Baháʼí in Bakersfield was Mrs. W. H. Repogle who died about March–April 1934. A talk on the local radio station then named KPMC (now KNZR (AM)) broadcast a Baháʼí's story in 1938. A community of Baháʼís is visible by 1964 and giving public talks in Bakersfield in 1965. Stephen had returned to Bakersfield before 1965 and begun working for the police department, the very year that first female office of the Bakersfield police, hired by his father, retired. Powers himself had also returned and he was visible giving a talk on the religion in 1966. However, after working for the force for 3 years Stephen testified against the police, as a policeman, about an incident in Bakersfield resulting in a race harassment case against the police, and then father and son received harassment. Stephen resigned from the force August 1969.

With the appointment of Earl Warren to the US Supreme Court a project to collect oral histories from those that knew him was undertaken and Powers was interviewed in Bakersfield. The resulting book was published in 1971. Among the anecdotes he told the interviewer, he remarked on a childhood event he said affected his whole life:

I wanted to tell you something ... and I think it's affected my whole life, and I don't know if I can tell it very well, but I've thought about it a lot of times.

I can tell how old I was because of where we lived - you know we moved all the time - and when I was just about two years old, I was walking down the street and having a hell of a lot of trouble because my shoelaces were untied and had come out of the holes, and every time I'd take a step I would step on one of those strings and stumble. And, you know, it was a major problem. A flat tire's nothing compared to that. And everybody who would pass would laugh and think it was so funny you know, me stumbling along.

And I passed a house, and there was a woman, and I remember that she was a little tongue-tied, sitting on a step. And she saw what was happening, and she called me in. And she spent about 20 minutes treating me like an adult, teaching me how - of course the ends were gone off the shoestrings - to twist the end and put it through the hole. Then we laced and unlaced my shoes three or four times until I knew how to do it, and then she taught me how to tie a knot. And we sat there for a while, and then I went along. And, as little as I was, I thought, "I'd like to be like that kind of person. I'd like to be like her." I think it influenced my entire life, a little thing.

And again I say, these little things that one does - considerate, compassionate, courageous - I guess it's pretty hard to be able to realize the impact they have."

The families of father and son Powers moved back to Tucson and was visible at a program for the World Religion Day observance in 1972. Wife Mildred died in Tucson in 1973.

==== Oklahoma City ====
Powers was visible as part of the Baha’i community of Oklahoma City, Oklahoma which was profiled in April 1976 including being photographed, one of some 800 in the state and 45 adults in Oklahoma City.

Powers died there in December aged 76. He is buried at the Chapel Hill Memorial Gardens Cemetery.

== Legacy ==
March 5, 2010 a rebroadcast of Powers' This I Believe episode was aired on The Bob Edwards Show. The event was marked in Bakersfield. The show remains available. In the presentation the commentators reviewed his forward thinking efforts and the wide scale of his reading across religions and they were struck by his pursuit of knowledge from an awareness of Lawrence of Arabia to actually reading the Qur'an, the way the Bahá'í quote "The earth is but one country and mankind its citizens" was emphasized in his life and was found when there were so few Bahá'ís around, and the way the New Testament inspired him to "put down his gun".
