= Bernice Layne Brown =

First Lady of California (1908–2002)

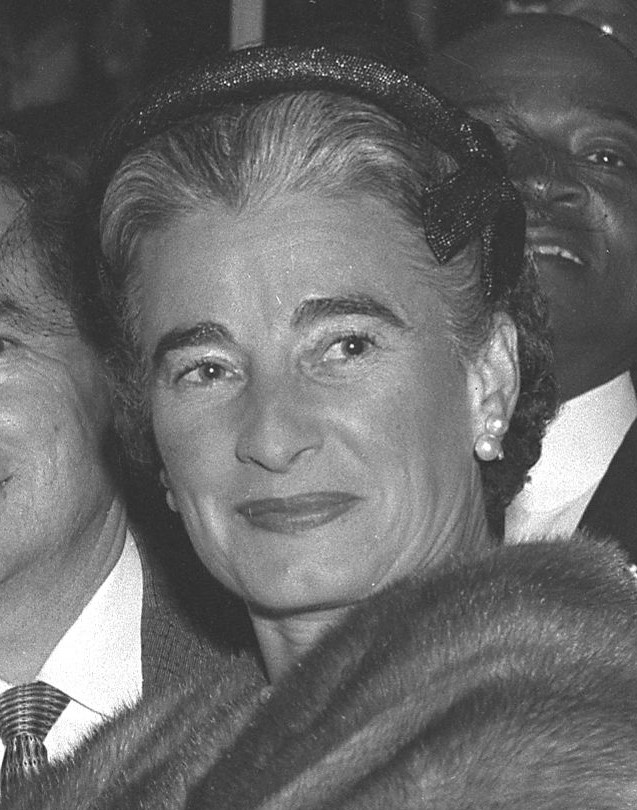
- Brown in 1958

First Lady of California
- In role January 5, 1959 – January 2, 1967
- Governor: Pat Brown
- Preceded by: Virginia Knight
- Succeeded by: Nancy Reagan

Personal details
- Born: Bernice E. Layne; November 19, 1908 San Francisco, California, U.S.
- Died: May 9, 2002 (aged 93) Los Angeles, California, U.S.
- Party: Democratic
- Spouse: Edmund "Pat" Brown (m. 1930; died 1996)
- Children: Barbara; Cynthia; Jerry; Kathleen

Bernice E. Layne Brown (November 19, 1908 – May 9, 2002) was the wife of the 32nd governor of California Edmund "Pat" Brown and the mother of the 34th and 39th governor of California, Jerry Brown.

Bernice Layne was born on November 19, 1908, in San Francisco, California, the daughter of Alice (née Cuneo) and Arthur Layne. Future governor Pat Brown had been three years ahead of her in the same high school, and in spite of her parents's misgivings about her youth, Brown was allowed to begin seeing her socially when she was 13. A 1928 graduate of University of California, Berkeley, she began a career in teaching, in an era when women teachers were put on a 3-year probation that denied them the right to marry until their 4th year in the profession. Choosing love over a career, Bernice and Pat ran off to Reno, Nevada, and married on October 30, 1930. They had four children: Jerry, Kathleen, Cynthia and Barbara, all born in San Francisco.

Bernice Brown became first lady of California after her husband defeated William Knowland in 1958. She was known for being a great speaker, and often made references to family life. In 1962, her husband was elected to a second term, defeating Richard Nixon. Pat Brown's bid for a third term in 1966 ended in defeat to future U.S. president Ronald Reagan.

She lived to see her son Jerry serve two terms as governor (1975–1983), and died May 9, 2002, at age 93.
