= Virginia Knight =

First Lady of California (1918–2010)

Virginia Piegrue Knight

First Lady of California
- In office August 2, 1954 – January 5, 1959
- Governor: Goodwin Knight
- Preceded by: Nina Warren
- Succeeded by: Bernice Layne Brown

Personal details
- Born: Virginia Piegrue; October 12, 1918 Fort Dodge, Iowa, U.S.
- Died: November 29, 2010 (aged 92) Los Angeles, California, U.S.
- Spouse(s): C. Lyle Carlson (m. 1942; died 1944) Goodwin Knight (m. 1954; died 1970)
- Occupation: Civic leader, poet

Virginia Piegrue Knight (October 12, 1918 – November 29, 2010) was an American civic figure who served as first lady of California from 1954 to 1959 during the governorship of Goodwin Knight. Her activities in that role included conservation work at the Governor's Mansion, documentation of the state’s earlier first ladies and promotion of public tours of the residence.

== Early life ==
Knight was born Virginia Piegrue in Fort Dodge, Iowa, and moved with her family to Los Angeles in 1923. She married Lieutenant C. Lyle Carlson of the United States Army Air Forces in 1942; he was killed in action over Italy in 1944. Following his death she volunteered with wounded servicemembers, earning the sobriquet "Viola Queen" from the Military Order of the Purple Heart.

== First Lady of California ==
Governor Knight, whose first wife died in 1952, married Virginia Carlson on August 2, 1954 in Beverly Hills.

During her tenure, Knight supervised refurbishment of the mansion's kitchen, initiated a lighting scheme based on her personal teapot collection and assembled a photographic gallery of California’s gubernatorial spouses that remains on display. She also wrote short poems for use at political events and was a regular participant in public dances with the governor.

== Later activities ==
After leaving the mansion in 1959, Knight continued to support heritage initiatives and veterans' organizations. An oral history interview recorded for the Bancroft Library at the University of California, Berkeley recounts her cataloguing of artefacts in the Governor's Mansion and her advocacy for its designation as a state historic park.

== Personal life ==
The Knights resided in the Hancock Park neighborhood of Los Angeles. Goodwin Knight died in 1970; Virginia Knight lived in the same home until her death on November 29, 2010 at the age of ninety‑two. A statement released by her family characterized her as "born to be first lady." She was interred at Rose Hills Memorial Park in Whittier, California.
