= 1958 California gubernatorial election =

- November 4, 1958
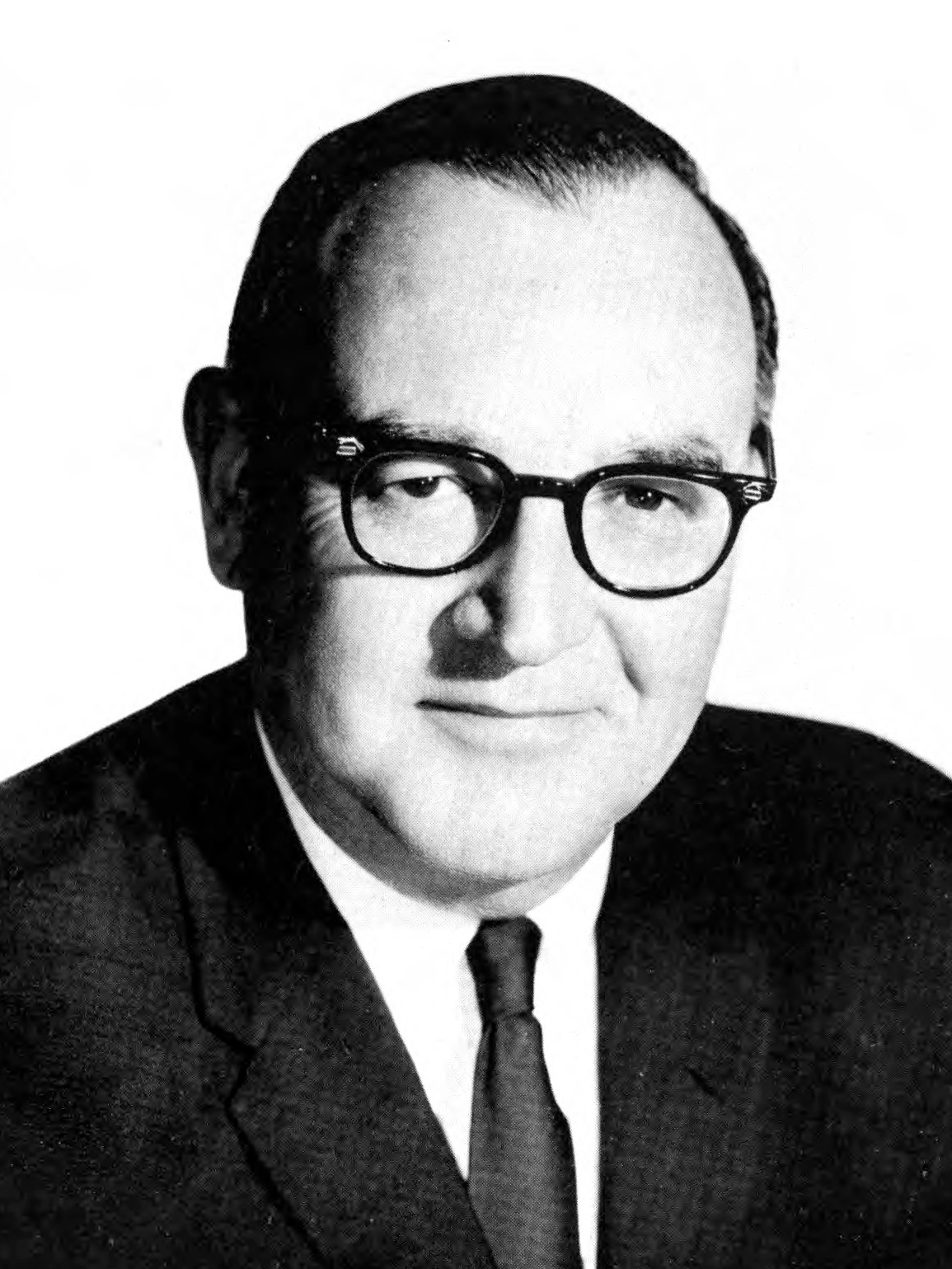

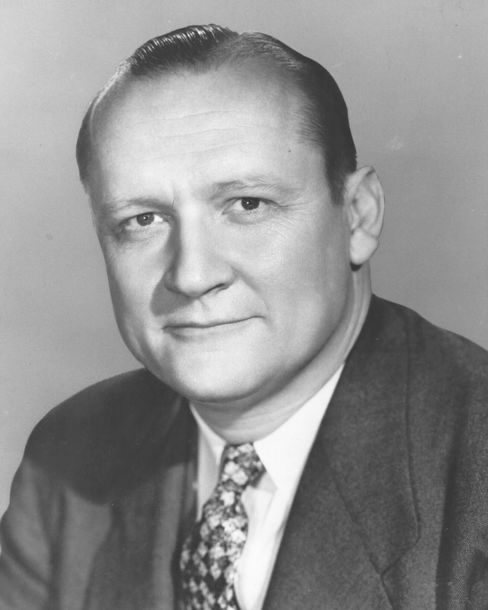
Nominee	Pat Brown	William Knowland
Party	Democratic	Republican
Popular vote	3,140,076	2,110,911
Percentage	59.75%	40.16%
- County results Brown: 50–60% 60–70% 70–80% Knowland: 50–60%
Governor before election
Goodwin Knight
Republican
Elected Governor
Pat Brown
Democratic

The 1958 California gubernatorial election was held on Tuesday November 4. Incumbent governor Goodwin Knight initially ran for re-election to a third term, but eventually withdrew and ran for election to the Senate. Incumbent senator William Knowland switched places with Knight to run for governor, but was defeated in a landslide by Democratic Attorney General Pat Brown, who won the first of his two terms as governor of California.

Knowland's decision to run for governor came in spite of strong opposition from Knight, who had wanted to run for re-election rather than for the Senate. Knowland's use of heavy-handed tactics to force Knight from the race, along with labor mobilization against Proposition 18, was a major factor in the Democratic landslide in California in 1958.

== Primary elections ==
Primary elections were held on June 3, 1958.

=== Democratic primary ===
==== Candidates ====
- Edmund G. "Pat" Brown, incumbent Attorney General of California
- Donald Donaldson
- William F. Knowland, incumbent U.S. Senator (cross-filing)

==== Results ====
Democratic primary results
Party	Candidate	Votes	%
Democratic	Edmund G. "Pat" Brown	1,890,622	82.62%
Republican	William F. Knowland	313,385	13.69%
Democratic	Donald Donaldson	84,449	3.69%
Total votes		2,288,456	100.00%

=== Republican primary ===
==== Candidates ====
- Edmund G. "Pat" Brown, incumbent Attorney General of California (cross-filing)
- William F. Knowland, incumbent U.S. Senator

==== Results ====
Republican primary results
Party	Candidate	Votes	%
Republican	William F. Knowland	1,290,106	77.48%
Democratic	Edmund G. "Pat" Brown	374,879	22.52%
Total votes		1,664,985	100.00%

== General election ==
=== Campaign ===
California was considered a Republican stronghold in the post-World War II era, electing Republican governors Earl Warren and Goodwin Knight, as well as senators Richard Nixon, Knowland, and Thomas Kuchel. Knowland was a prestigious two-term Senator who had served as Senate Majority Leader and Senate Minority Leader. His seat was considered safe going into the 1958 midterm elections, but he stunned everyone when he announced his intention to run for governor instead of re-election to the Senate. This was especially surprising because California had a relatively popular Republican governor in Goodwin Knight who was also expected to be re-elected. Knowland coerced Knight into a "backroom deal" in which Knowland and Knight would "trade places", with Knight running for Knowland's Senate seat. Knight really had no desire to be Senator and in later years lamented how Knowland "strongarmed" him into the switch. Knowland thought being governor would enhance his chances of challenging another Californian, Richard Nixon, for the 1960 Republican presidential nomination. For their part, the Democrats nominated popular state Attorney General Pat Brown, who was the only Democrat that held a statewide office in a Republican leaning state. As it turned out, the Knowland-Knight switch was not popular with California voters. Brown steadily gained in the polls and defeated Knowland for governor, and Knight lost to Congressman Clair Engle in the Senate race.

=== Results ===
1958 California gubernatorial election
Party	Candidate	Votes	%	±%
Democratic	Pat Brown	3,140,076	59.75%	+16.59%
Republican	William F. Knowland	2,110,911	40.16%	−16.67%
Independent	William P. Gale (write-in)	2,301	0.04%	
Independent	L. A. Delaney (write-in)	505	0.01%	
Independent	Herbert Steiner (write-in)	239	0.00%	
	Scattering	1,745	0.03%	
Majority		1,029,165	19.58%	
Total votes		5,255,777	100.00%	
Democratic gain from Republican		Swing	+33.26%	

==== Results by county ====
Brown's landslide victory ended many streaks of Republican dominance in various counties throughout the state. Brown was the first Democrat to ever win Imperial County and Riverside County in a gubernatorial election. Meanwhile, this was the first election since 1859 in which Humboldt County voted for a Democratic candidate; the first since 1882 in which Marin County and San Mateo County voted for a Democratic candidate; the first since 1902 in which Monterey County voted for a Democratic candidate; the first since 1906 in which Nevada County, San Benito County, San Luis Obispo County, Santa Cruz County, and Sutter County voted for a Democratic candidate; and the first since 1910 in which Calaveras County, Colusa County, Glenn County, Lake County, Mendocino County, Napa County, Sonoma County, Tehama County voted for a Democratic candidate. Brown also won the largest share for a Democrat in Alpine County since 1882 and in Orange County since the latter's establishment in 1889. Those two counties, along with Mono County and Santa Barbara County were the most historically reliably Republican counties that Brown failed to flip. (Note: Pat Brown's son, Jerry Brown, would ultimately flip Alpine, Orange, and Santa Barbara counties in his 1978 reelection landslide, but Mono County would not vote Democratic until 1998.)

As of 2026, this election is also the last time that a Democrat has carried Glenn County or Sutter County. A Democrat would not carry Tulare County or Inyo County again until 2026. Moreover, a Democratic candidate has only carried Calaveras and Mariposa counties in one election since 1958, in 1978.

County	Edmund G. Brown Democratic		William F. Knowland Republican		William P. Gale Write-in		All Others (Note: These votes are Scattering unless otherwise noted in each county) Write-in		Margin		Total votes cast
County	#	%	#	%	#	%	#	%	#	%	Total votes cast
Alameda	228,105	64.84%	123,372	35.07%	129	0.04%	197 (Note: 42 for Delaney, 52 for Steiner)	0.06%	104,733	29.77%	351,803
Alpine	77	43.50%	100	56.50%	0	0.00%	0	0.00%	-23	-12.99%	177
Amador	2,665	64.23%	1,483	35.74%	0	0.00%	1	0.02%	1,182	28.49%	4,149
Butte	16,886	55.23%	13,677	44.74%	10	0.03%	0	0.00%	3,209	10.50%	30,573
Calaveras	3,067	58.99%	2,088	40.16%	44	0.85%	0	0.00%	979	18.83%	5,199
Colusa	2,924	64.04%	1,642	35.96%	0	0.00%	0	0.00%	1,282	28.08%	4,566
Contra Costa	95,128	65.14%	50,812	34.79%	0	0.00%	104	0.07%	44,316	30.34%	146,044
Del Norte	3,368	62.05%	2,060	37.95%	0	0.00%	0	0.00%	1,308	24.10%	5,428
El Dorado	5,720	66.43%	2,889	33.55%	0	0.00%	1 (Note: 1 for Delaney)	0.01%	2,831	32.88%	8,610
Fresno	72,692	66.84%	35,747	32.87%	322	0.30%	0	0.00%	36,945	33.97%	108,761
Glenn	4,190	61.46%	2,625	38.51%	1	0.01%	1	0.01%	1,565	22.96%	6,817
Humboldt	21,013	62.12%	12,799	37.84%	0	0.00%	14 (Note: 7 for Delaney)	0.04%	8,214	24.28%	33,826
Imperial	8,580	51.93%	7,943	48.07%	0	0.00%	0	0.00%	637	3.86%	16,523
Inyo	2,780	53.92%	2,374	46.04%	0	0.00%	2	0.04%	406	7.87%	5,156
Kern	52,587	62.87%	30,889	36.93%	22	0.03%	140 (Note: 116 for Delaney, 3 for Steiner)	0.17	21,698	25.94%	83,638
Kings	9,227	68.33%	4,264	31.58%	5	0.04%	7	0.05%	4,963	36.75%	13,503
Lake	3,411	55.72%	2,711	44.28%	0	0.00%	0	0.00%	700	11.43%	6,122
Lassen	3,553	69.68%	1,545	30.30%	1	0.02%	0	0.00%	2,008	39.38%	5,099
Los Angeles	1,254,226	57.91%	909,429	41.99%	1,120	0.05%	996 (Note: 233 for Delaney, 112 for Steiner)	0.05%	344,797	15.92%	2,165,771
Madera	8,133	68.95%	3,663	31.05%	0	0.00%	0	0.00%	4,470	37.89%	11,796
Marin	29,096	55.98%	22,832	43.93%	21	0.04%	26	0.05%	6,264	12.05%	51,975
Mariposa	1,437	58.01%	1,040	41.99%	0	0.00%	0	0.00%	397	16.03%	2,477
Mendocino	10,759	63.71%	6,116	36.22%	0	0.00%	13	0.08%	4,643	27.49%	16,888
Merced	15.430	67.79%	7,328	32.19%	0	0.00%	4	0.02%	8,102	35.59%	22,762
Modoc	2,010	62.77%	1,192	37.23%	0	0.00%	0	0.00%	818	25.55%	3,202
Mono	461	44.41%	577	55.59%	0	0.00%	0	0.00%	-116	-11.18%	1,038
Monterey	26,676	56.12%	20,853	43.87%	8	0.02%	0	0.00%	5,823	12.25%	47,537
Napa	14,544	60.95%	9,309	39.01%	0	0.00%	9	0.04%	5,235	21.94%	23,862
Nevada	5,035	58.20%	3,601	41.63%	0	0.00%	15	0.17%	1,434	16.58%	8,651
Orange	85,364	46.30%	98,729	53.55%	0	0.00%	259	0.14%	-13,365	-7.25%	184,352
Placer	13,422	68.75%	6,093	31.21%	9	0.05%	0	0.00%	7,329	37.54%	19,524
Plumas	3,714	74.16%	1,277	25.50%	0	0.00%	17	0.34%	2,437	48.66%	5,088
Riverside	46,611	52.65%	41,824	47.24%	70	0.08%	24 (Note: 1 for Delaney, 8 for Steiner)	0.03%	4,787	5.41%	88,529
Sacramento	107,679	70.95%	44,027	29.01%	52	0.03%	0	0.00%	63,652	41.94%	151,758
San Benito	3,213	59.53%	2,182	40.43%	2	0.04%	0	0.00%	1,031	19.10%	5,397
San Bernardino	86,882	58.33%	61,891	41.55%	124	0.08%	48	0.03%	24,991	16.78%	148,945
San Diego	150,925	51.71%	140,734	48.22%	140	0.05%	73 (Note: 19 for Delaney, 6 for Steiner)	0.03%	10,191	3.49%	291,872
San Francisco	219,413	70.79%	90,430	29.17%	66	0.02%	60 (Note: 19 for Delaney, 41 for Steiner)	0.02%	128,983	41.61%	309,969
San Joaquin	48,284	62.58%	28,807	37.34%	33	0.04%	32	0.04%	19,477	25.24%	77,156
San Luis Obispo	15,315	56.78%	11,646	43.17%	0	0.00%	13	0.05%	3.669	13.60%	26,974
San Mateo	97,475	61.76%	60,215	38.15%	55	0.03%	83 (Note: 18 for Delaney, 15 for Steiner)	0.05%	37,260	23.61%	157,828
Santa Barbara	23,440	49.43%	23,849	50.50%	12	0.03%	21 (Note: 21 for Delaney)	0.04%	-509	-1.08%	47,222
Santa Clara	108,732	59.50%	73,874	40.42%	0	0.00%	142	0.08%	34,858	19.07%	182,748
Santa Cruz	17,635	51.58%	16,528	48.34%	0	0.00%	25 (Note: 25 for Delaney)	0.07%	1,107	3.24%	34,188
Shasta	14,024	71.24%	5,645	28.68%	10	0.05%	6	0.03%	8,379	42.57%	19,685
Sierra	826	64.89%	447	35.11%	0	0.00%	0	0.00%	379	29.77%	1,273
Siskiyou	8,747	67.34%	4,233	32.59%	10	0.08%	0	0.00%	4,514	34.75%	12,990
Solano	27,429	69.79%	11,847	30.14%	0	0.00%	27	0.07%	15,582	39.65%	39,303
Sonoma	30,841	57.04%	23,216	42.94%	0	0.00%	14	0.03%	7,625	14.10%	54,071
Stanislaus	31,984	62.50%	19,168	37.46%	0	0.00%	23	0.04%	12,816	25.04%	51,175
Sutter	5,032	50.10%	5,009	49.87%	3	0.03%	0	0.00%	23	0.23%	10,044
Tehama	5,860	63.50%	3,368	36.50%	0	0.00%	0	0.00%	2,492	27.00%	9,228
Trinity	2,315	69.37%	1,014	30.39%	0	0.00%	8	0.24%	1,301	38.99%	3,337
Tulare	25,668	58.19%	18,407	41.73%	0	0.00%	35	0.08%	7,261	16.46%	44,110
Tuolumne	4,771	66.66%	2,374	33.17%	12	0.17%	0	0.00%	2,397	33.49%	7,157
Ventura	32,789	61.63%	20,368	38.28%	20	0.04%	24 (Note: 3 for Delaney, 2 for Steiner)	0.05%	12,421	23.35%	53,201
Yolo	13,014	70.27%	5,485	29.62%	0	0.00%	20	0.11%	7,529	40.66%	18,519
Yuba	4,992	60.43%	3,264	39.51%	0	0.00%	5	0.06%	1,728	20.92%	8,261
Total	3,140,076	59.75%	2,110,911	40.16%	2,301	0.04%	2,489	0.05%	1,029,165	19.58%	5,255,777

Counties that flipped from Republican to Democratic

- Butte
- Calaveras
- Colusa
- Contra Costa
- Del Norte
- El Dorado
- Glenn
- Humboldt
- Imperial
- Inyo
- Kern
- Lake
- Los Angeles
- Marin
- Mariposa
- Mendocino
- Modoc
- Monterey
- Napa
- Nevada
- Riverside
- San Benito
- San Bernardino
- San Diego
- San Francisco
- San Joaquin
- San Luis Obispo
- San Mateo
- Santa Clara
- Santa Cruz
- Siskiyou
- Sonoma
- Stanislaus
- Sutter
- Tehama
- Tulare
- Ventura

== See also ==
- Elections in California

== Statistics ==
- Compiled by Frank M. Jordan, Secretary of State. State of California. Statement of Vote. Direct Primary Election June 3, 1958.
- Compiled by Frank M. Jordan, Secretary of State. State of California. Statement of Vote. General Election November 4, 1958.
- Gubernatorial Elections, 1787-1997. Washington, D.C.: Congressional Quarterly Inc. 1998. ISBN 1-56802-396-0.
