= Frederick N. Howser =

American politician (1905–1987)

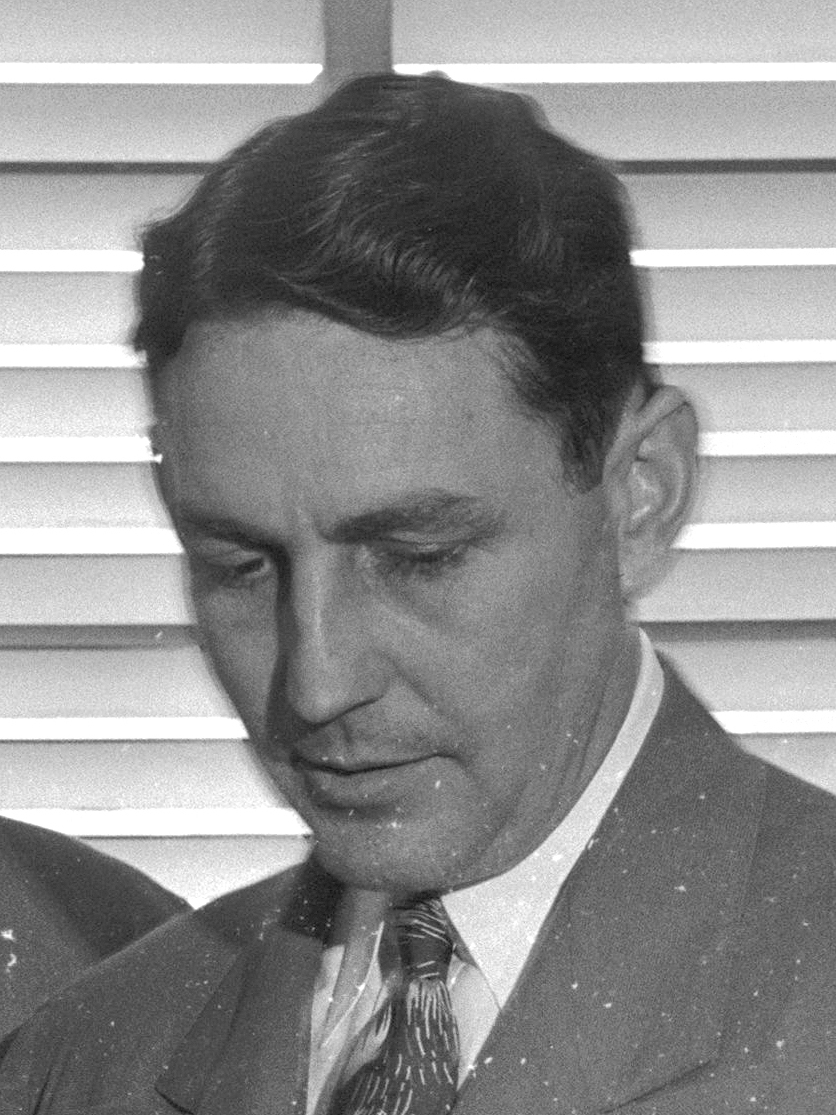
- Howser in 1943

22nd Attorney General of California
- In office January 5, 1947 – January 8, 1951
- Governor: Earl Warren
- Preceded by: Robert W. Kenny
- Succeeded by: Pat Brown

31st District Attorney of Los Angeles County
- In office 1943–1946
- Preceded by: John F. Dockweiler
- Succeeded by: William E. Simpson

Member of the California State Assembly from the 71st district
- In office January 6, 1941 – February 2, 1943
- Preceded by: Paul Peek
- Succeeded by: Carl Fletcher

Personal details
- Born: Frederick Napoleon Howser; April 11, 1905 David City, Nebraska, U.S.
- Died: April 26, 1987 (aged 82) Laguna Hills, California, U.S.
- Party: Republican
- Spouse: Helen Sten
- Children: 1

Frederick Napoleon Howser (April 11, 1905 – April 26, 1987) was an American politician and attorney. From 1947 to 1951, he was the 22nd Attorney General of California.

== Early career ==
Howser was born in David City, Nebraska on April 11, 1905. He attended USC Law School and worked as chief deputy city attorney for the city of Long Beach in the late 1930s.

In 1940, Howser was elected to the first of two terms in the California State Assembly, representing Long Beach. Howser was appointed Los Angeles County District Attorney in 1943, following the death of John F. Dockweiler. Howser was elected for a full term as District Attorney in 1944.

As both District Attorney and a member of the Assembly, Howser maintained ties to powerful liquor lobbyist Arthur Samish. Samish would later claim to have "maneuvered" Howser into the chairmanship of the Assembly's Public Morals Committee before later steering his appointment as District Attorney.

In addition to his connection with Samish, Howser was also tied to gambling interests, including gambling boat operator Tony Cornero, who purportedly paid Howser $35,000 for help arranging the return of Cornero's gambling boats to Los Angeles.

== Attorney General ==
Howser ran for California Attorney General in 1946 after incumbent Attorney General Robert W. Kenny opted to forgo reelection to challenge Republican Governor Earl Warren. He received a $170,000 contribution from gambler Elmer "Bones" Remmer, owner of the Oaks Card Room in Emeryville and the Menlo Club on Turk Street in San Francisco. Howser's connections to gambling, however, attracted the scrutiny of Warren, who refused to support Howser's campaign. Howser was nonetheless able to capitalize on the Republican wave of Warren's reelection and the similarity of his name to the outgoing lieutenant governor, Frederick F. Houser. Winning election with 55 percent of the vote, Howser defeated opponent Pat Brown, a future governor, in what would be Brown's first run at statewide office.

Howser's ties to gambling interests followed him into office as Attorney General. Seeking to limit his exposure to Howser, Warren formed the California Crime Commission in 1947, purportedly to investigate organized crime in California, chaired by Admiral William H. Standley and directed by a close Warren ally, Warren Olney III. Olney and the Commission subsequently released a series of reports alleging an attempt to create a "state-wide plan for racket protection under the cloak of the Attorney General's Office."

The investigations circling Howser's office pushed him into direct conflict with Warren, who Howser claimed was attacking him because "he thinks I am a threat to his domination of the Republican Party." Undeterred, the Crime Commission established the most direct link between gambling and Howser's office following the arrest of Fred Grange, an associate of Tony Cornero, for the attempted bribery of the Mendocino County Sheriff. Grange subsequently identified Wiley Caddel, an appointee to Howser's office, as a collector in the slot machine protection racket Grange had been attempting to establish. Grange claimed Howser's monthly take was $100,000.

Holding on to his office despite being implicated in gambling rackets, Howser ran for reelection as Attorney General in 1950 but was defeated in the Republican primary. The winner, Edward S. Shattuck, went on to lose the general election to Pat Brown.

== Later life ==
Following his reelection defeat, Howser engaged in a private law practice for 37 years. He died in Laguna Hills, California, on April 26, 1987.

== Electoral history ==
California Attorney General Election, 1946
Party	Candidate	Votes	%
Republican	Frederick N. Howser	1,414,744	55.0
Democratic	Pat Brown	1,070,364	41.6
Prohibition	Claude A. Watson	85,688	2.75

California Attorney General Republican Primary Election, 1950
Party	Candidate	Votes	%
Republican	Edward S. Shattuck	551,934	47.5
Republican	Frederick N. Howser	276,843	24.0
Republican	Pat Brown	248,648	21.5
Republican	Claude A. Watson	36,624	3.2
Republican	Patrick J. Cooney	20,788	1.8
Republican	Marshall Abbott	19,319	1.7

Legal offices
Preceded by Robert W. Kenny	California Attorney General; 1947–1951	Succeeded by Pat Brown
