= Pat Brown =

Governor of California from 1959 to 1967

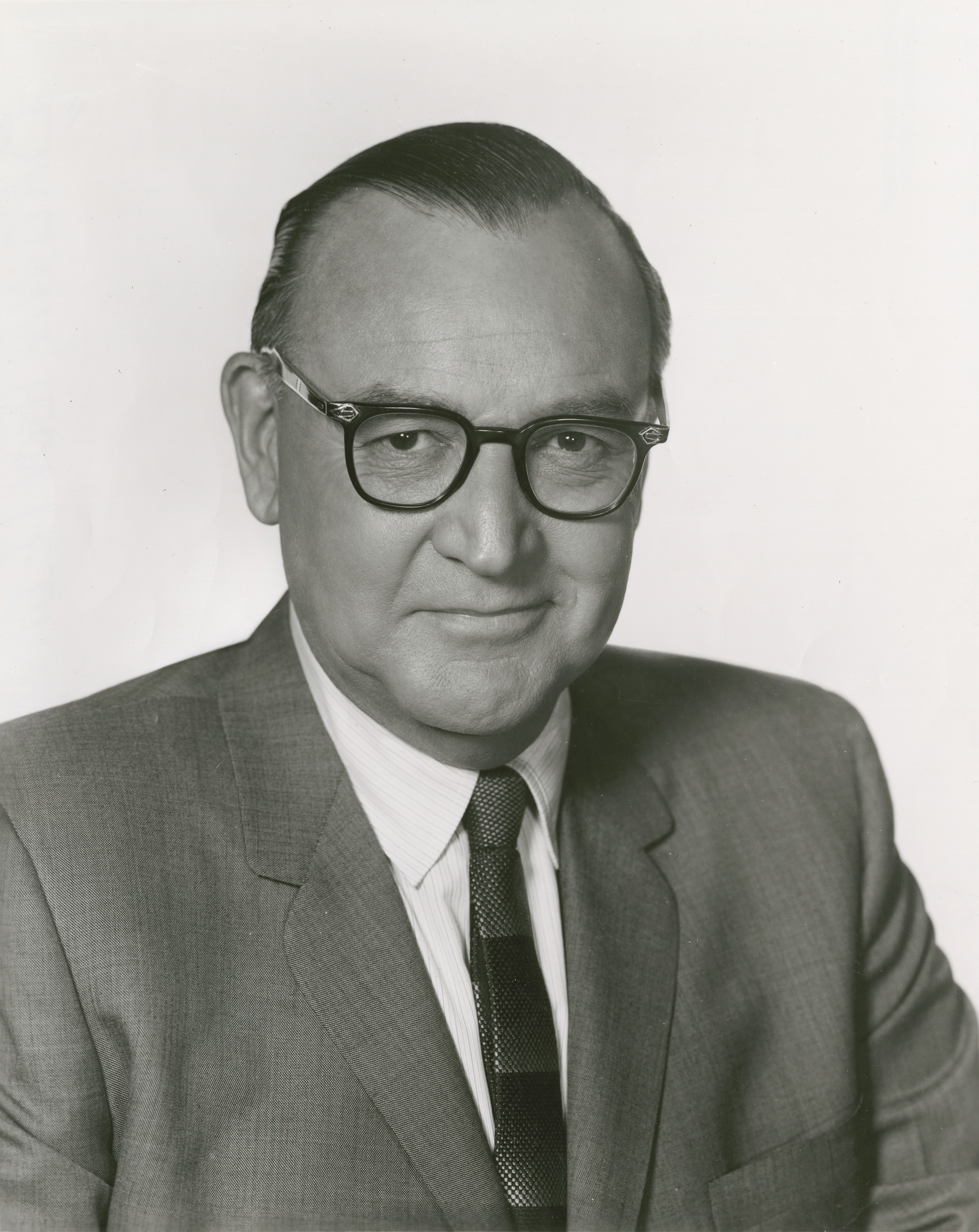
- Brown, c. 1963

32nd Governor of California
- In office January 5, 1959 – January 2, 1967
- Lieutenant: Glenn M. Anderson
- Preceded by: Goodwin Knight
- Succeeded by: Ronald Reagan

23rd Attorney General of California
- In office January 8, 1951 – January 5, 1959
- Governor: Earl Warren; Goodwin Knight
- Preceded by: Frederick N. Howser
- Succeeded by: Stanley Mosk

21st District Attorney of San Francisco
- In office January 8, 1944 – January 3, 1951
- Preceded by: Matthew Brady
- Succeeded by: Thomas C. Lynch

Personal details
- Born: Edmund Gerald Brown; April 21, 1905 San Francisco, California, U.S.
- Died: February 16, 1996 (aged 90) Los Angeles, California, U.S.
- Resting place: Holy Cross Cemetery (Colma, California)
- Party: Democratic (from 1932)
- Other political affiliations: Republican (before 1932)
- Spouse: Bernice Layne (m. 1930)
- Children: 4, including Jerry and Kathleen
- Education: San Francisco Law School (LLB)
- Profession: Lawyer

Edmund Gerald "Pat" Brown (April 21, 1905 – February 16, 1996) was an American lawyer and politician who served as the 32nd governor of California from 1959 to 1967. His first elected office was district attorney of San Francisco, and he was later elected attorney general of California in 1950, before becoming the state's governor after the 1958 election.

Born in San Francisco, Brown had an early interest in speaking and politics. He skipped college and earned an LL.B. law degree in 1927. In his first term as governor, Brown delivered on major legislation, including a tax increase and the California Master Plan for Higher Education. The California State Water Project was a major and highly complex achievement. He also pushed through civil-rights legislation. In a second term, troubles mounted, including the defeat of a fair housing law (1964 California Proposition 14), the 1960s Berkeley protests, the Watts riots, and internal battles among Democrats over support or opposition to the Vietnam War. He lost the 1966 California gubernatorial election for a third term to future president Ronald Reagan; his legacy has since earned him regard as the builder of modern California.

His son Jerry Brown was the 34th and 39th governor of California, as well as the 31st attorney general of California, holding two offices he once held. His daughter, Kathleen Brown, was the 29th California state treasurer, and an unsuccessful Democratic nominee for governor in 1994.

== Background ==
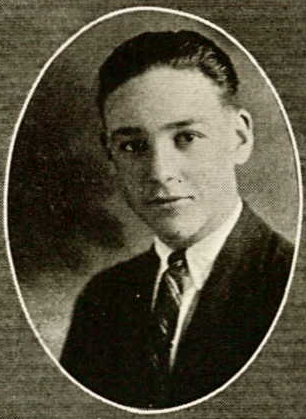
Brown in the Lowell High School yearbook, 1923

Brown was born in 1905 in San Francisco, California, one of four children of Ida (née Schuckman) and Edmund Joseph Brown. His father came from an Irish Catholic family, with his grandfather Joseph immigrating from County Tipperary, Ireland. His mother Ida was from a German Protestant family. He acquired the nickname "Pat" during his school years; the nickname was a reference to his Patrick Henry–like oratory. When he was 12 and selling Liberty Bonds on street corners, he would end his spiel with, "Give me liberty, or give me death."

Brown was a debate champion as a member of the Lowell Forensic Society at San Francisco's Lowell High School, where he held twelve offices of student government; he graduated from Lowell in 1923. Rather than pursue an undergraduate degree, he instead worked in his father's cigar store, which doubled as a gambling shop. He studied law at night, while working part-time for attorney Milton Schmitt, receiving an LL.B. degree from San Francisco Law School in spring 1927. After passing the California bar exam the following fall, he began full-time employment in Schmitt's office.

Brown ran as a Republican Party candidate for the State Assembly in 1928, but lost badly; he moved to the Democratic Party in 1934, as the Great Depression had made him lose confidence in the pro-business Republican Party. He quickly became a New Dealer, and an active party participant. His second attempt at election to public office came in 1939, running for district attorney of San Francisco against Matthew Brady, an incumbent of nineteen years, who beat him handily.

== District Attorney and Attorney General ==
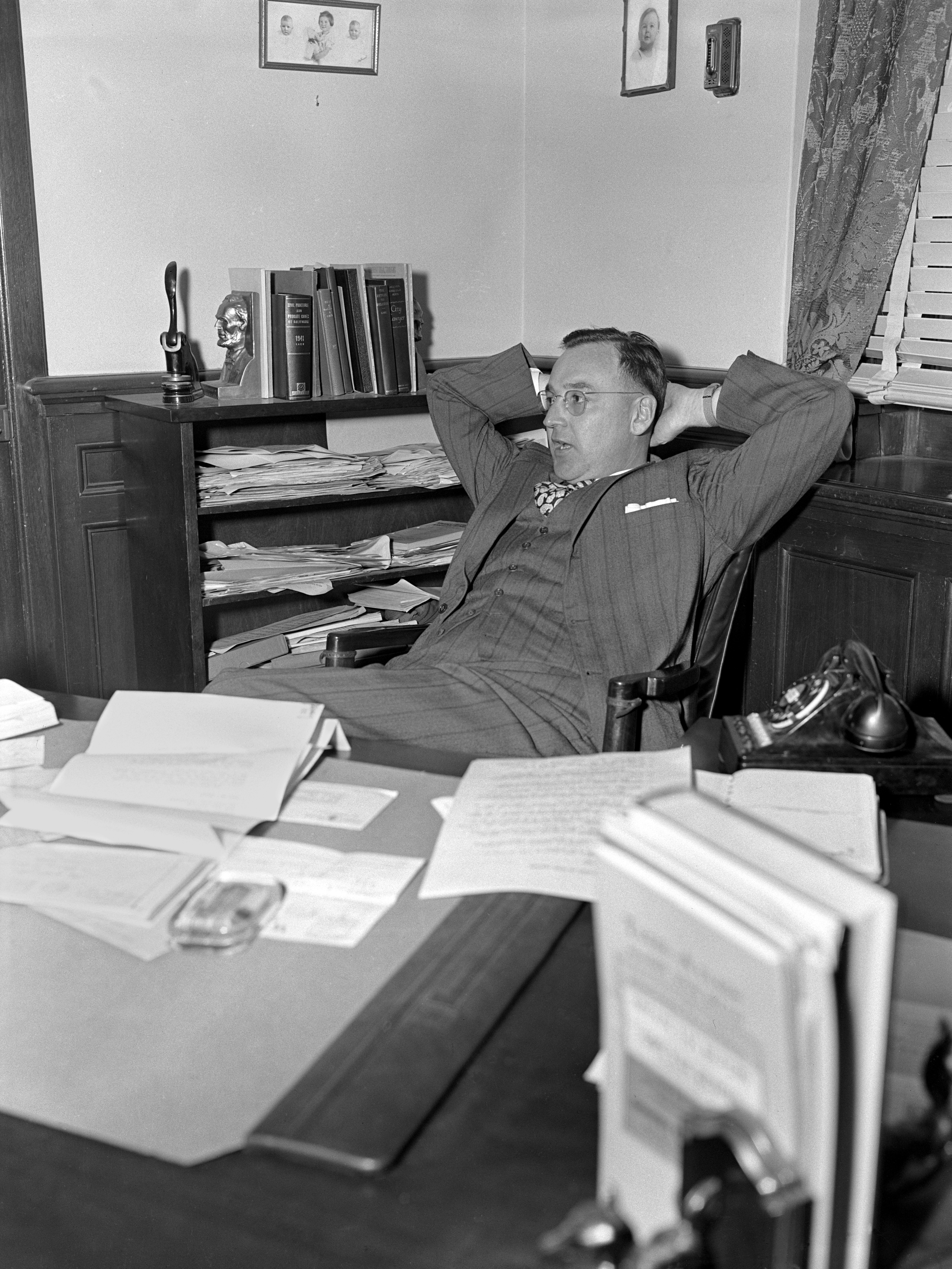
District Attorney-elect Brown at his desk, 1943

Four years after his defeat, Brown ran for district attorney again in 1943 with the slogan "Crack down on crime, elect Brown this time." His victory over Brady was decisive, coming to the surprise of San Francisco politicians, as well as bookmakers who had put 5 to 1 odds against his election. He was reelected to the office in 1947, and after seven years in office, received the support of Republican Governor Earl Warren. He emulated the course followed by Warren when the Governor himself was the Alameda County district attorney. His actions against gambling, corruption, and juvenile delinquency brought attention to his office.

In 1946, as the Democratic nominee, Brown lost the race for attorney general of California to Los Angeles County District Attorney Frederick N. Howser. Running again in 1950, he won election as Attorney General and was re-elected in 1954. As Attorney General, he was the only Democrat to win statewide election in California.

== 1958 Campaign for Governor ==
In the 1958 California gubernatorial election, he was the Democratic nominee for governor, running on a campaign of "responsible liberalism," with support for labor, and forcing the ballot name change of Proposition 18 from "Right-to-Work" to "Employer and Employee Relations," whereas Brown's opponent campaigned for such right-to-work laws as Proposition 18 provided. In the general election, Brown defeated Republican U.S. Senator William F. Knowland by 1,029,165 votes (60% to 40%), Proposition 18 and other anti-labor ballot measures were voted down, and Democrats were elected to a majority in both houses of the legislature, and to all statewide offices, excepting Secretary of State.

== Governorship (1959-1967) ==
=== First term (1959–1963) ===
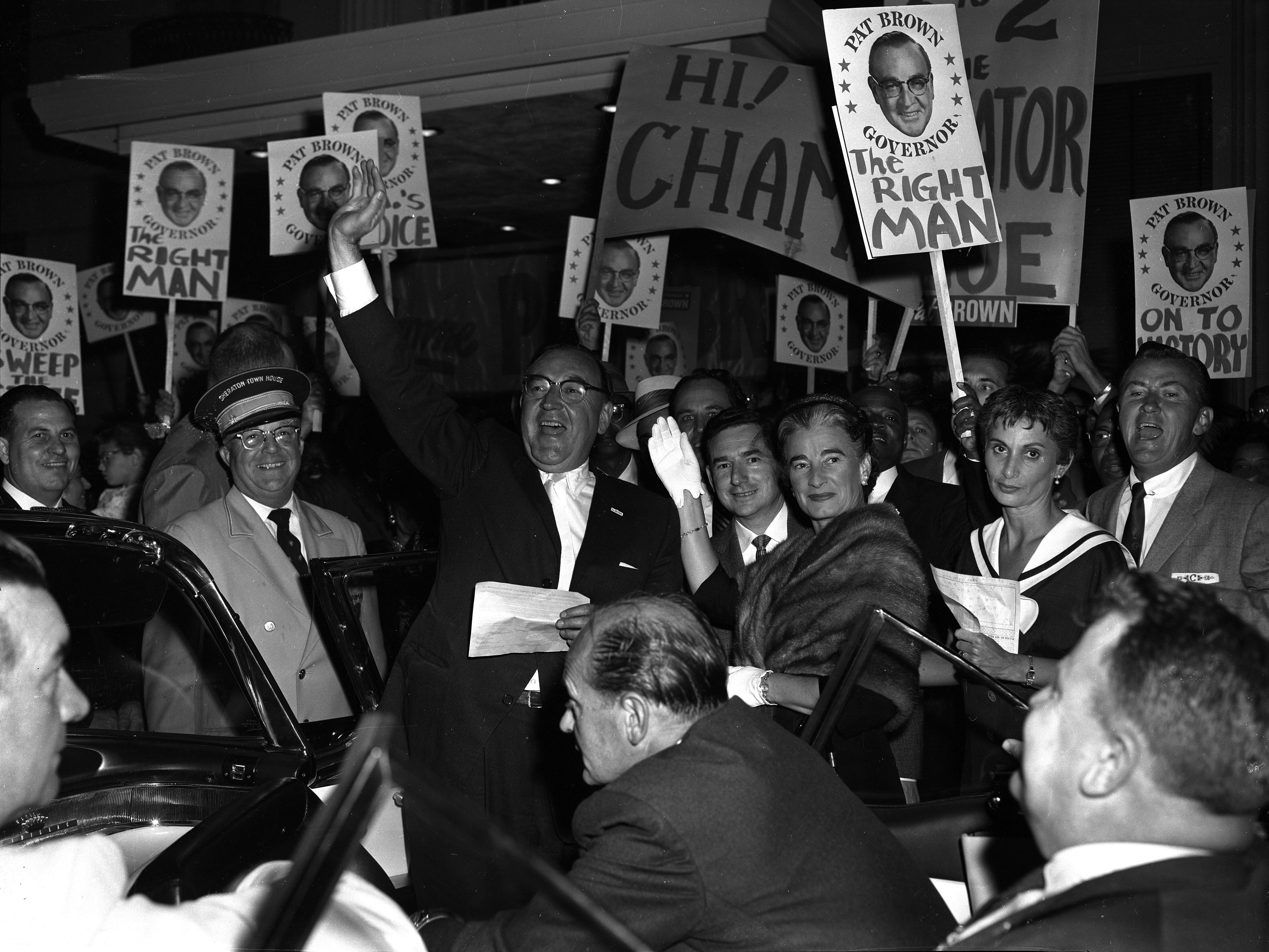
Pat and Bernice Brown at a campaign stop in Los Angeles, 1958

Brown was known for his cheerful personality, and his championing of building an infrastructure to meet the needs of the rapidly growing state. As journalist Adam Nagourney reports: "With a jubilant Mr. Brown officiating, California commemorated the moment it became the nation's largest state, in 1962, with a church-bell-ringing, four-day celebration. He was the boom-boom governor for a boom-boom time: championing highways, universities and, most consequential, a sprawling water network to feed the explosion of agriculture and development in the dry reaches of central and Southern California." Brown appointed Fred Dutton as chief of staff as a reward for his enormously energetic and effective role as campaign manager. Bert Levitt, a Republican friend, was named director of finance to draw up a state budget. The role of press secretary went to reporter Hale Champion. Further down the ladder, Brown cleaned house, replacing all the political appointees of his predecessor, Goodwin Knight. His team worked hard in preparation for the governor's inauguration. Although he was basically a moderate, Brown reached out to the powerful left wing in his party by emphasizing the word “liberal” repeatedly. He proclaimed: "Offered government by retreat, the people preferred progress." California was attracting newcomers at the rate of 500,000 a year, and there was no time to be lost in responding to the needs they created.

A number of measures designed to benefit working people were introduced, including a Fair Employment Practices Commission that helped African Americans break through the informal barriers that had kept them out of white-collar positions. Numerous other reforms were passed, largely thanks to cooperation from the Democratic leaders in the state legislature, including George Miller Jr. in the Senate and Bill Munnell and Jesse Unruh in the Assembly.

=== Tax increase ===
Brown wanted to expand state services but first had to end the deficit and obtain enough revenue for his plans. Tax increases were headed by the personal income tax, where the top rate went from 6% to 7%, with new exemptions for the poor. There was an increase in the profits taxes paid by banks and corporations, a tax on cigarettes, beer, and betting, as well as a severance tax on oil and natural gas. A few compromises were made, but in the end, Brown got his money for expansion of the state budget.

=== California State Water Project ===
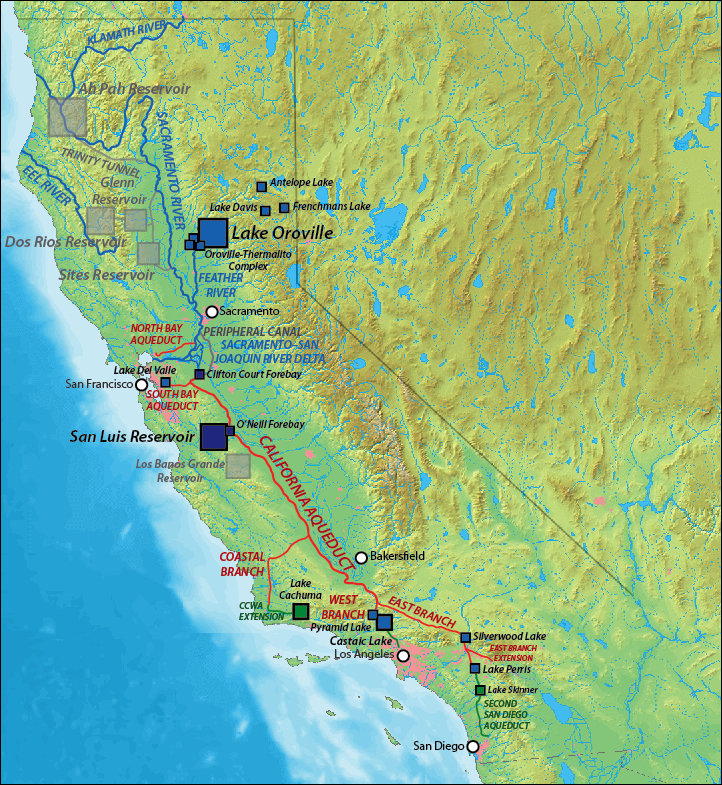
Map of the State Water Project infrastructure

With his administration beginning in 1959, Brown set in motion a series of actions whose magnitude was unseen since the governorship of Hiram Johnson. The post–World War II economic expansion brought millions of newcomers to the state which, along with the state's cyclical droughts, severely strained California's water resources, especially in dry Southern California. This began the California State Water Project, whose objective was to address the fact that one half of the state's people lived in a region containing one percent of the state's natural supply of water. Much of the state's extant water was controlled by regional bodies, and the federal government. These federally controlled areas were under the jurisdiction of the Bureau of Reclamation, which was considering the implementation of a "160-acre principle", a policy contained within the Newlands Reclamation Act of 1902, limiting delivery of federally subsidized water to parcels equal to the size of a homestead, which was 160 acres. This brought strong opposition from the agricultural industry, and as such would require significant splintering of existent land holdings. To relieve this threat to the agricultural economy, Brown and other state leaders began the State Water Project, whose master plan included a vast system of reservoirs, aqueducts, and pipelines powered by pump stations and electrical generating plants to transport the water statewide. This included the capture of the Sacramento River runoff, redirecting the seabound water through the San Joaquin Valley, not only irrigating the arid desert regions, but also providing Southern California, particularly Los Angeles County, with the water required to sustain expansions in population and industry. The entire project was projected to take sixty years, costing $13 billion, nearly $104 billion in 2015 dollars.

Opposition to the State Water Project was immediate, especially with Sacramento River Delta users worrying about saltwater intrusion which had already been a concern without factoring in redirection of outward freshwater flow. Residents of the Bay Area and elsewhere in Northern California were concerned about the increase in water draw the South might demand as populations expanded. While Southern support for the project was clear, the Metropolitan Water District of Southern California worried that the project did not ensure permanent rights to Northern water. This led the legislature to amend the plan, prohibiting the state's southern water rights from being rescinded, clearing any remaining reservations from the state's southern water authorities. Governor Brown was a staunch supporter of the plan, energetically opposing critics and seeking solutions. He lobbied Congress to exempt California from the 160-acre rule, lauding the benefit of employment and progress to the state's northern and southern residents, calling for an end to the north–south rivalry. Brown also reduced his introductory bond issuance from $11 billion to $1.75 billion, beginning a television campaign to appeal to residents. Governor Brown insisted on the Burns-Porter Act which sent the bond issue to a referendum; the 1960 vote saw Butte County as the sole Northern California county not voting against the measure. However, the growth in Southern California's population led to the plan's adoption.

=== Political reforms ===
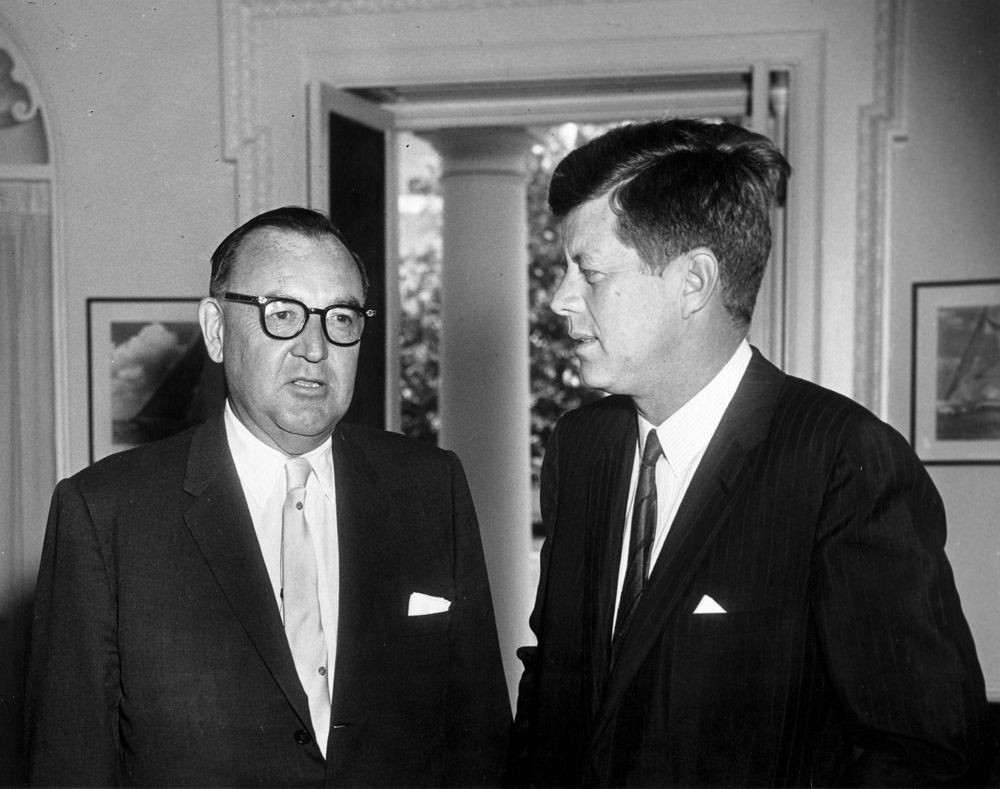
Governor Brown with President Kennedy at the White House in April 1961

The first year of Brown's administration saw the abolition of the cross-filing system that had enabled candidates to file with multiple political parties at once while running for office. The 1964 U.S. Supreme Court decision Reynolds v. Sims declared unconstitutional California's "federal plan", which had allocated the apportionment of state senators along county lines, as opposed to population-based districts. Now, while the City and County of San Francisco had one state senator, Los Angeles County received thirteen; this massive shift in the legislature's composition led Brown, along with Assembly Speaker Jesse M. Unruh, to change the way California government operated.

In 1962, the Constitutional Revision Commission was established. It operated until 1974, proposing changes to the state's 1879 constitution, decreasing length and complexity by nearly fifty percent through ballot propositions recommended by the commission, of which seventy-five percent were approved by voters. Among the enacted reforms were removal of the 120-day limit on legislative sessions, increased legislators' salaries, and a reduction in the percentage of signatures required to place propositions on the ballot. Governor Brown insisted on Unruh's reforms that abolished various government agencies and consolidated others.

=== Structural reform of the executive branch ===
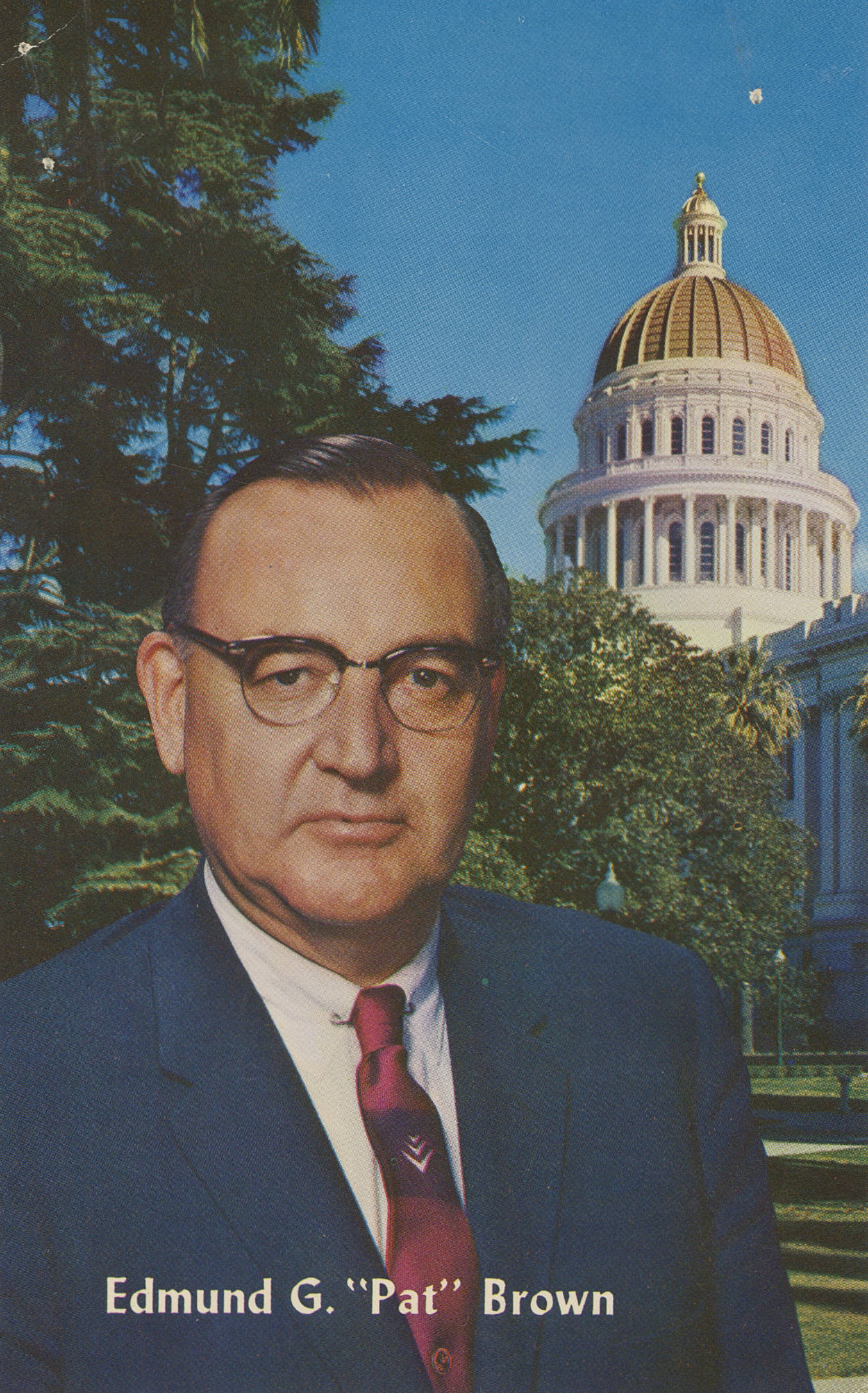
Brown on a postcard c. 1960

Upon taking office, Brown realized that the state executive branch had grown to an unmanageable level of complexity because of the legislature's unfortunate habit of solving problems by creating new boards and commissions directly responsible to the governor—approximately 360 boards, commissions, and agencies all reported directly to the governor. In February 1961, Brown proposed a massive reorganization plan for the state government, which included the creation of several so-called "super-agencies" (originally spelled with a hyphen) to greatly reduce the number of direct reports to the governor. In September 1961, Brown appointed the secretaries of the first four superagencies (of eight then planned). The superagencies continue to exist today as part of the long-term legacy of the Brown administration, although there are currently only seven, and there are several Cabinet-level departments outside of them.

Another part of Brown's 1961 plan was to consolidate many basic maintenance functions such as building maintenance and grounds maintenance into a single government department, in lieu of the traditional approach in which each agency separately handled those functions. In September 1963, Brown began to appoint officials to lead the new California Department of General Services, after the legislature passed and he signed a bill creating that department.

=== Education ===
Californians were energized by the need to catch up with the Soviet Union, which had taken the lead in technology by launching the world's first space satellite Sputnik 1. Brown signed the California Master Plan for Higher Education in 1960. This new system defined the roles of the University of California, the California State University, and California Community College systems, each with different goals, objectives, offerings, and student composition. It provided a model for other states to develop their own similar systems. Governor Brown sought free higher education for California students, which the Master Plan provided. His successor, Ronald Reagan, would change this policy, insisting on student tuition. With the passage of Proposition 13 in 1978, state education funding fell further, straining Brown's Master Plan due to lack of property tax funds.

=== Re-election of 1962 against Richard Nixon ===
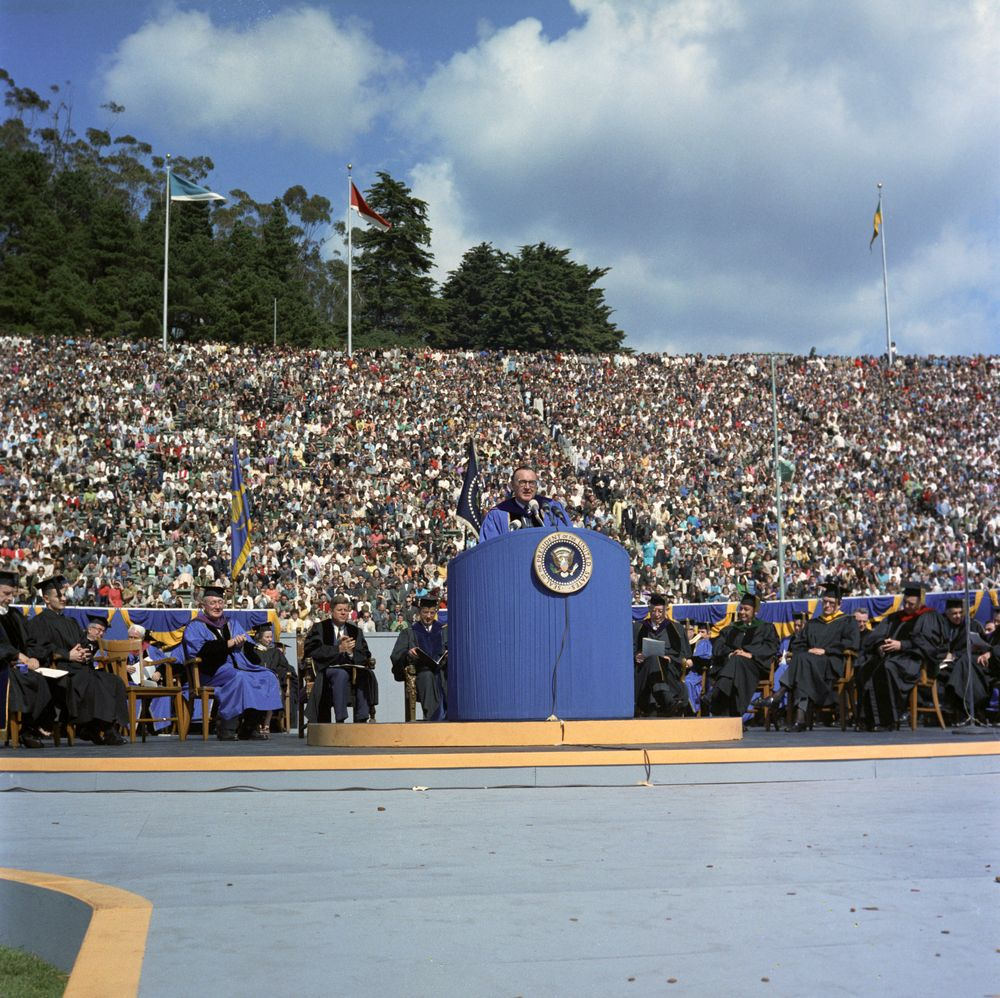
Governor Brown speaks on Charter Day at UC Berkeley, 1962

Brown's first term as governor was very successful, but failings on important matters to him were costly. Agriculture and special interests defeated his best efforts to pass a $1.25 per hour minimum wage, and Brown's opposition to capital punishment was overruled by the practice being supported statewide. Brown was a supporter of Senator John F. Kennedy in the 1960 presidential election, but Brown's California delegation to the Democratic National Convention did not abide by his support for Kennedy, which nearly cost Kennedy the nomination. Brown's opponent in 1962 was former Vice President Richard Nixon. Having narrowly lost the presidency to Kennedy in 1960, Nixon was not interested in the governorship of his native California other than as a path to the White House. Unfamiliar with California politics and matters, Nixon resorted to accusing Brown of 'softness' against communism, which was not a successful platform. In the November 1962 election, Brown was reelected by 296,758 votes, whereupon Nixon famously held his self-proclaimed "last press conference" (he would eventually become president in 1969).

=== Second term (1963–1967) ===
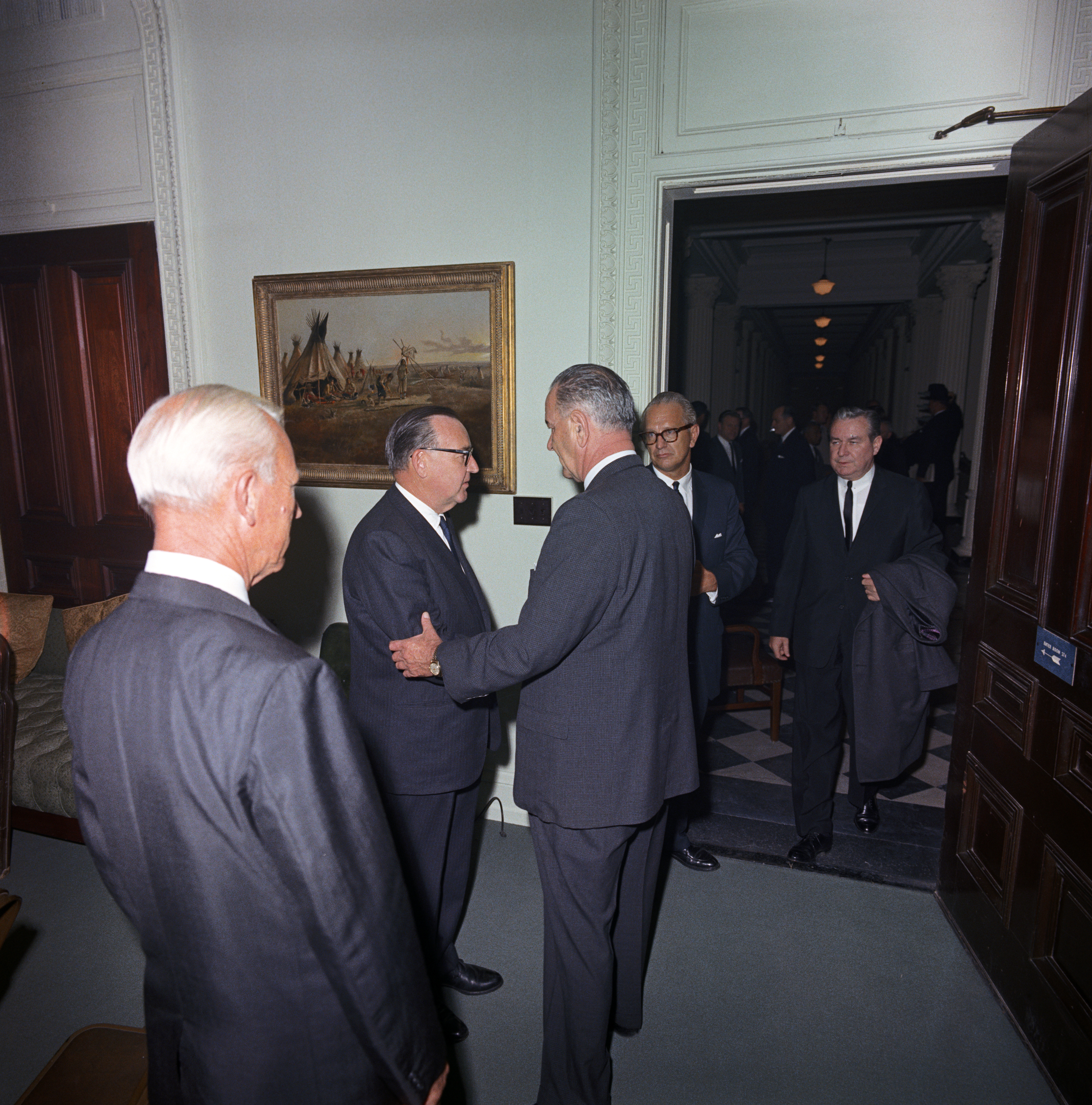
Brown meets with President Lyndon B. Johnson in the White House, November 25, 1963

A number of progressive labor laws were introduced while the Rumford Fair Housing Act was passed, which provided that landlords could not deny people housing because of ethnicity, religion, sex, marital status, physical handicap, or familial status. This new law brought a slew of lawsuits against the state government, and led to California Proposition 14 (1964), which overturned the Rumford Act with nearly two-thirds in favor. The U.S. Supreme Court decision of Reitman v. Mulkey (387 U.S. 369) upheld the California Supreme Court's ruling that the proposition overturning the Rumford Act was unconstitutional.

Brown's terms in office were marked by a dramatic increase in water-resources development. The California Aqueduct, built as part of the program, was named for him. He also presided over the implementation of the California Master Plan for Higher Education, fair employment legislation, a state economic development commission, and a consumers' council. He sponsored some 40 major proposals, gaining passage of 35.

=== Watts riots ===
On August 11, 1965, the Watts riots erupted in the Watts neighborhood of Los Angeles, lasting for a week. On the evening of the same day, Marquette Frye was pulled over on suspicion of driving while under the influence; a field sobriety test was administered, he was arrested, and the police officer called for the impounding of his vehicle. When his mother, Rena Price, was brought to the scene by his brother, a scuffle began, and soon crowds built, snowballing the incident into full-blown riots. By August 13, the third day of riots, Governor Brown ordered 2,300 National Guardsmen to Watts, which increased to 3,900 by the night's end. By the conflict's end, 1,000 people were wounded and 34 died, $40 million worth of damage was inflicted, and 1,000 buildings destroyed. This incident began massive protests and riots throughout the state which, along with developments of the Vietnam War, began Brown's decline in popularity.

=== Capital punishment ===
During both terms in office, Brown commuted 23 death sentences, signing the first commutation on his second day in office. One of his more notable commutations was the death sentence of Erwin "Machine-Gun" Walker, whose execution in the gas chamber for first-degree murder had been postponed because of an attempted suicide some hours before it was scheduled to take place. After Walker recovered, his execution was postponed while he was being restored to mental competency. After Walker was declared sane in 1961, Brown commuted Walker's death sentence to life without the possibility of parole. Walker was later paroled after the California Supreme Court held that the governor could not legally deny a prisoner the right to parole in a death-sentence commutation. Another prisoner whose death sentence was commuted by Brown committed at least one murder after being paroled.

While governor, Brown's attitude toward capital punishment was often ambivalent, if not arbitrary. An ardent supporter of gun control, he was more inclined to let convicts go to the gas chamber if they had killed with guns than with other weapons. He later admitted that he denied clemency in one capital case principally since the legislator who represented the district in which the murder occurred held a swing vote on farmworker legislation supported by Brown, and had told Brown that his district "would go up in smoke" if the governor commuted the man's sentence.

In contrast, Governor Brown approved 36 executions, including the highly controversial cases of Caryl Chessman in 1960 and Elizabeth Duncan in 1962; she was the last female put to death before a national moratorium was instituted. Though he had supported capital punishment while serving as district attorney, as attorney general, and when first elected governor, he later became an opponent of it.

During the Chessman case, Brown proposed that capital punishment be abolished, but the proposal failed. His Republican successor, Ronald Reagan, was a firm supporter of capital punishment and oversaw, in 1967, the last execution in California prior to the U.S. Supreme Court ruling that it was unconstitutional in Furman v. Georgia (1972).

=== Campaign for third term ===
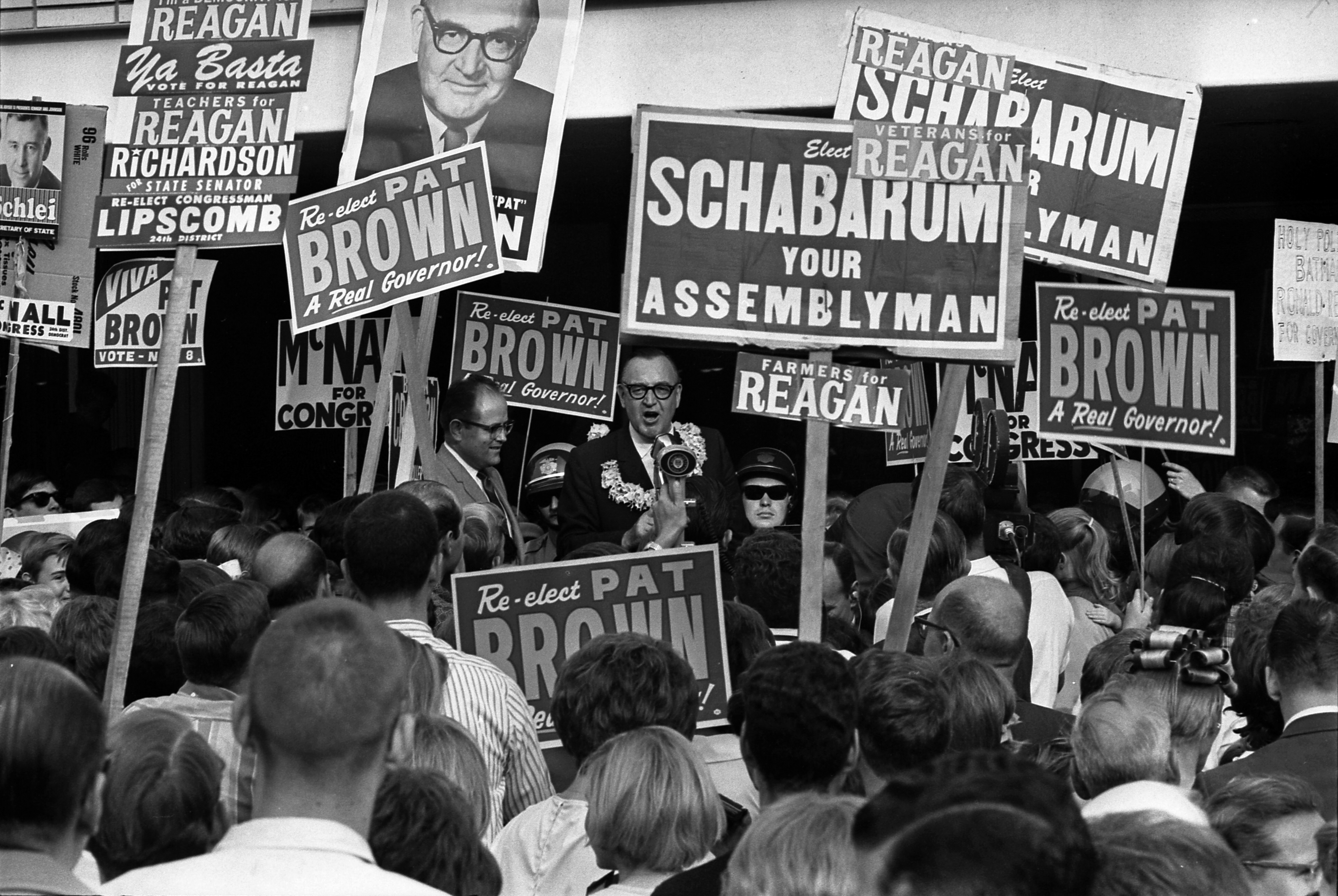
Brown surrounded by friendly and hostile campaign signs in West Covina, 1966

Brown's decision to seek a third term as governor, violating an earlier promise not to do so, hurt his popularity. His sagging popularity was evidenced by a tough battle in the Democratic primary, normally not a concern for an incumbent. Los Angeles Mayor Sam Yorty received nearly forty percent of the primary vote while Brown only received fifty-two, a very low number for an incumbent in a primary election.

The California Republican Party seized upon Brown's increasing unpopularity by nominating a well-known and charismatic political outsider, actor and union leader Ronald Reagan. With Richard Nixon and William Knowland working tirelessly behind the scenes and Reagan trumpeting his law-and-order campaign message, Reagan received almost two thirds of the primary vote over George Christopher, the moderate Republican former mayor of San Francisco; his push towards the general election held great momentum. At first, Brown ran a low-key campaign, stating that running the state was his biggest priority, but later began campaigning on the record of his eight years as governor. As Reagan's lead in the polls increased, Brown began to panic and made a serious gaffe when he ran a television commercial in which he told a group of schoolchildren that his opponent was an actor, and reminded them "it was an actor who shot Abraham Lincoln. The comparison of Reagan to John Wilkes Booth did not go over well, furthering the decline of Brown's campaign.

On election day, Reagan was ahead in the polls and favored to win a relatively close election. Brown lost the 1966 election to Ronald Reagan in his second consecutive race against a future Republican President. Reagan won in a landslide; his 993,739 vote plurality surprised even his staunchest supporters. Reagan's victory against an incumbent was a dramatic upheaval. His 57.5% majority nearly matched that of Brown's own victory in 1958, and Reagan garnered some 990,000 new votes from the larger electorate.

=== Legacy ===
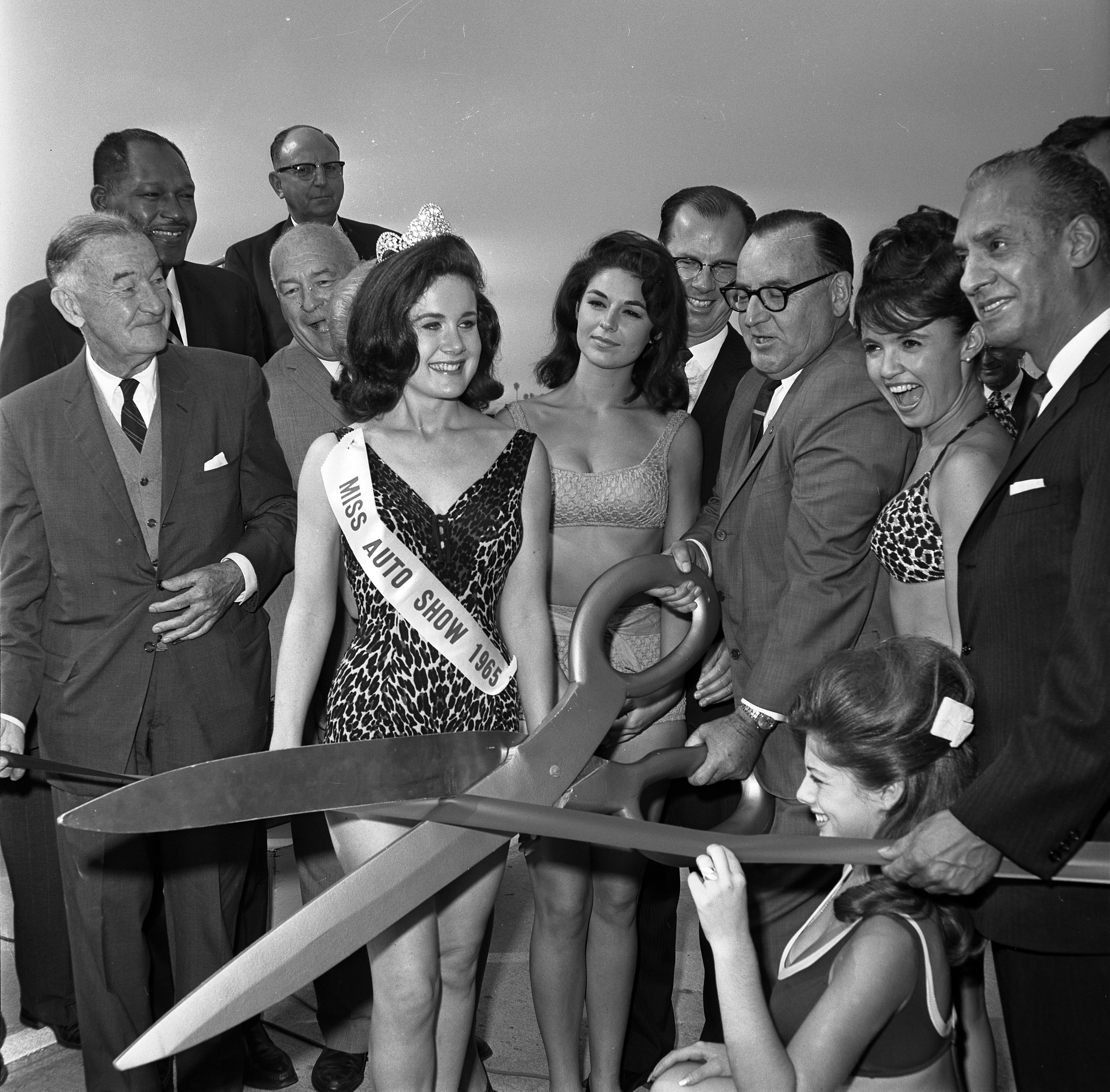
Brown at the dedication of a new section of the Santa Monica Freeway, 1964

Although he left office defeated, Brown's time in office is one which has fared well. Brown was a relatively popular Democrat in what was, at the time, a Republican-leaning state. After his reelection victory over Richard Nixon in 1962, he was strongly considered for Lyndon Johnson's running mate in the 1964 presidential election, a position that eventually went to Hubert Humphrey. However, Brown's popularity began to sag amidst the civil disorders of the Watts riots and the early anti–Vietnam War demonstrations at U.C. Berkeley. His monumental infrastructure projects, building aqueducts, canals, and pump stations, established new fertile lands in the Central Valley; the Governor Edmund G. Brown California Aqueduct was named after him. During his term, four new University of California campuses were built, as well as seven new California State University campuses, making the Master Plan's higher education system the largest in the world. During the Watergate scandal President Richard Nixon considered appointing Brown as special counsel, but the choice was rejected by Attorney General Elliot Richardson.

While no person elected Governor of California has been denied a second term since Earl Warren defeated Culbert Olson in 1942, Brown's losing bid for a third term to Ronald Reagan was the last time, as of 2022, an incumbent governor lost in the general election (Gray Davis' loss in the 2003 recall was a non-quadrennial election). Today, Governor Brown is widely credited with the creation of modern California.

== Personal life and death ==
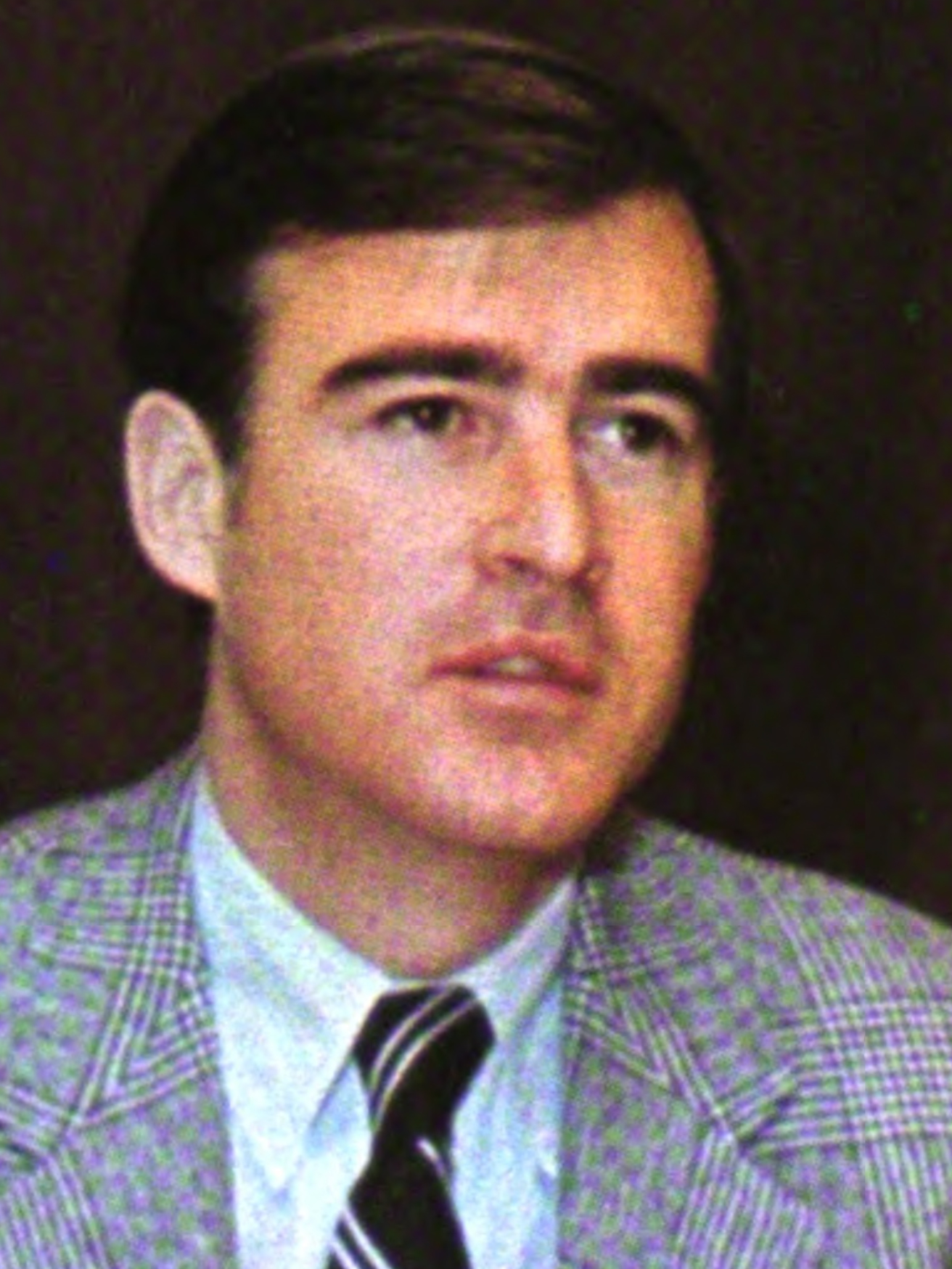
Brown's son Jerry c. 1971

Brown's wife, Bernice Layne, was a fellow student at Lowell High School, but it was not until the completion of his law degree, and her teaching credential, that they began a courtship. Following his loss in the Assembly election, he and Bernice eloped in 1930. They had four children, who were all born in San Francisco:

- Barbara Layne Brown (born July 13, 1931)
- Cynthia Arden Brown (born October 19, 1933 – died March 29, 2015)
- Edmund Gerald "Jerry" Brown Jr. (born April 7, 1938)
- Kathleen Lynn Brown (born September 25, 1945)

In 1958, as governor-elect, Brown appeared as a guest challenger on the TV panel show What's My Line?

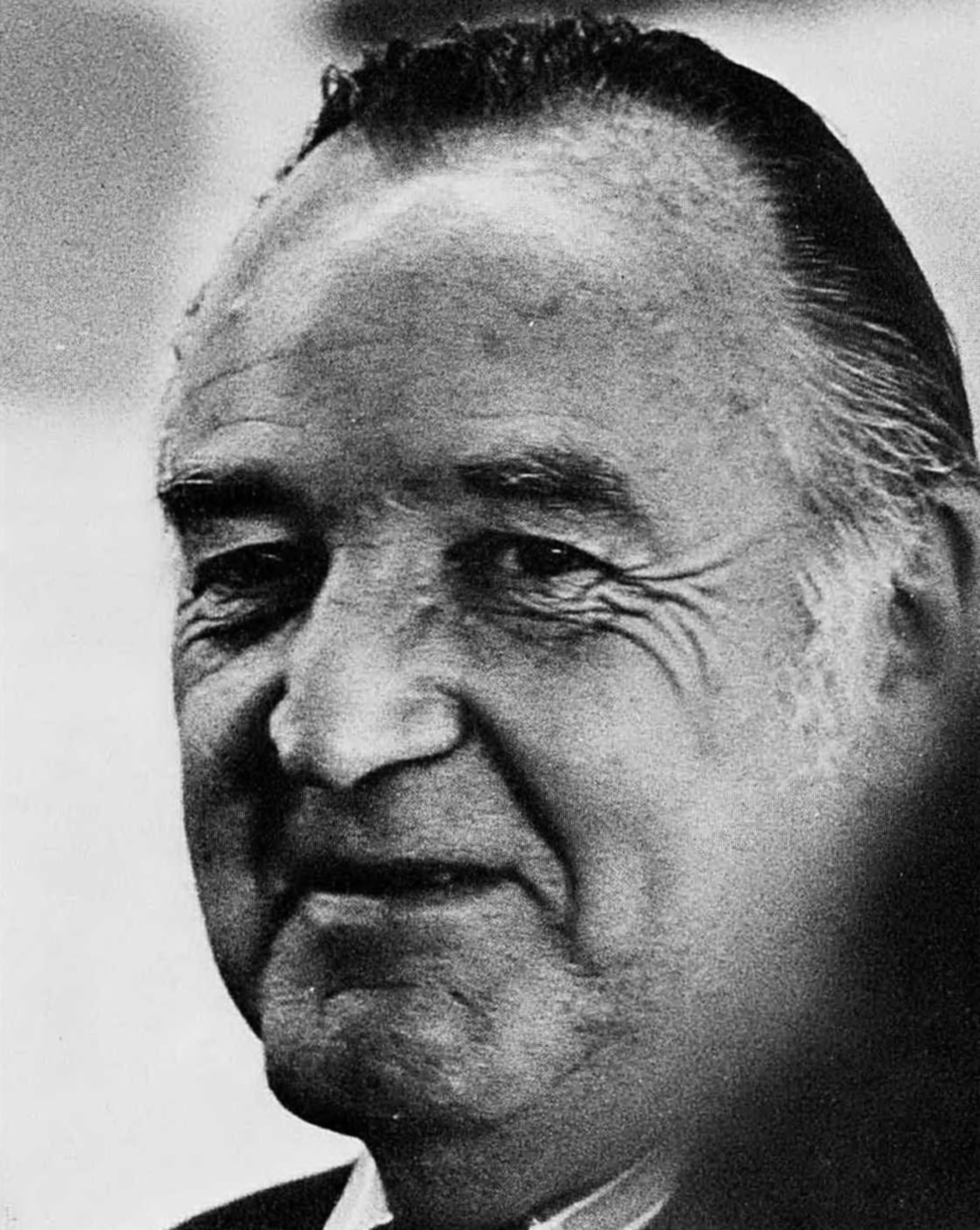
Brown speaks at the University of California, Santa Barbara, October 28, 1972

After leaving office, Brown returned to the practice of law and also experienced success in business, investing in a company involved with the Indonesian petroleum industry.

Brown died from a heart attack at his home in the Beverly Canyon section of Los Angeles on February 16, 1996, at the age of 90. He is interred at Holy Cross Cemetery in Colma.

My son asked me what I hoped to accomplish as Governor. I told him: essentially to make life more comfortable for people, as far as government can. I think that embraces everything from developing the water resources vital to California's growth, to getting a man to work and back fifteen minutes earlier if it can be done through a state highway program.

== Presidential and vice presidential candidate ==
Unlike his son Jerry Brown, Pat himself never seriously ran for President of the United States, but was frequently California's "favorite son." During the 1952 Democratic primaries, Brown placed distant second to Estes Kefauver in total votes (65.04% to 9.97%), losing California to Kefauver. During Governor Brown's first term, the national census confirmed that California would become the nation's most populous state. This, along with Brown's political popularity, would contribute to two national presidential victories, when he pledged his votes to the national candidates, John F. Kennedy in 1960, and Lyndon B. Johnson in 1964, at the Democratic conventions. As governor, Brown was again California's favorite son in 1960, winning his home state with a large margin to his only opponent, George H. McLain. Running only in the California primary, the state's sheer population size placed him second, behind the eventual nominee, John F. Kennedy, thus repeating his 1952 state and national rankings. However, only one delegate cast his vote for Brown at the 1960 Democratic National Convention.

During the 1964 primaries, by running again only in California, the nation's largest state electorate vote, Brown placed first this time in both the California and the Democratic national primary total, besting the eventual nominee. However, along with over a dozen other candidates, aside from George Wallace, Brown was a stalking horse for incumbent Lyndon B. Johnson, whose nomination was assured.

Brown also briefly sought the vice presidential nomination at the 1956 Democratic National Convention, winning one vote.

== Electoral history ==
1958 gubernatorial election, California
Party	Candidate	Votes	%
Democratic	Pat Brown	3,140,076	59.75
Republican	William F. Knowland	2,110,911	40.16
Other	Write-ins and scattering	4,790	0.09
Total votes		5,255,777	100.00
Turnout			
Democratic gain from Republican			

1962 gubernatorial election, California
Party	Candidate	Votes	%
Democratic	Pat Brown (I)	3,037,109	51.89
Republican	Richard M. Nixon	2,740,351	46.82
Prohibition	Robert L. Wyckoff	69,700	1.19
Other	Write-ins and scattering	6,110	0.10
Total votes		5,853,270	100.00
Turnout			57.50
Democratic hold			

1966 gubernatorial election, California
Party	Candidate	Votes	%
Republican	Ronald Reagan	3,742,913	57.55
Democratic	Pat Brown (I)	2,749,174	42.27
Other	Scattering	11,358	0.18
Total votes		6,503,445	100.00
Turnout			57.70
Republican gain from Democratic			

== See also ==
- Membership discrimination in California social clubs

Political offices
Preceded by Goodwin Knight	Governor of California; 1959–1967	Succeeded by Ronald Reagan
Legal offices
Preceded by Frederick N. Howser	Attorney General of California; 1951–1959	Succeeded by Stanley Mosk
Party political offices
Preceded by Richard P. Graves	Democratic nominee for Governor of California; 1958, 1962, 1966	Succeeded by Jesse M. Unruh
