= 1958 California Proposition 18 =

California Proposition 18 was on the November 4, 1958 California ballot measure as an initiated constitutional amendment. This measure is more commonly referred as the "right to work" law and would have added a new provision, Section 1-A to Article 1 of the State Constitution. The amendment would "prohibit employers and employee organizations from entering into collective bargaining or other agreements which establish membership in a labor organization, or payment of dues or charges of any kind, as a condition of employment or continued employment." That is, making union membership voluntary, rather than compulsory, for employment.

The proposition would also declare certain practices unlawful such as those practices relating to membership in labor organizations. It also provides for injunction and damage suits against any individuals or group found to violate or attempt to violate the amendment. Proposition 18 also provides the definition for a “labor organization”. The proposition did not pass.

== Background ==
Unions started to gain ground following the passage of several governmental acts such as the Railway Labor Act of 1926, Wagner Act of 1935, and the Taft Hartley Act of 1947. The newly empowered unions would be able to engage in union shop activities due to the nature of these acts. With negotiating power now firmly in the hands of union officials and employers a growing concern about the power of employment and safety of workers' rights loomed. There was a shift from craft-unions to industrial-unions, ultimately changing the population of union members from approximately 3,000,000 in 1935 to 15,000,000 in 1945. Labor unions had more power than they ever did before. In response to these major changes, Congress passed the Taft-Hartley Act of 1947. The Taft-Hartley Act of 1947, still in effect today, forbids certain practices by unions, including forcing workers to join a union, and allowed states to elect to pass right-to-work laws.

The creation of the McClellan Committee, which was a select committee in charge of investigating the extent of corruption in labor-management relations, would expose many corrupt bosses and labor unions. This national issue would be decided on the state level.

== Proponents ==
Proponents of the constitutional amendment argued that all workers should have the right to elect whether or not they join a labor organization. Supporters of the proposition believed that voluntary unionism would provide a safeguard against the exploitation that could arise from monopoly control of employment.

Those who supported the measure reasoned that it would grant workers the freedom of choice that was guaranteed in the U.S. Constitution to all American citizens. This amendment would consequently protect workers from the unfair practices and corruption of employers and union officers.

Supporters also claimed that passing the right-to-work law in California would help rid of disloyal union leaders.

Supporters include:

- Senator William F. Knowland
- William Jennings Bryan Jr., Co-chairman of Southern California section of Californians for Yes on Prop 18, son of William Jennings Bryan
- Irene Dunne, honorary chairmanship of Women's Division for Californians yes on Prop 18
- August E. Sommerfield, Former Steward, Local 170, Sheetmetal Workers Unions
- Arthur E. Simpson, Member, Local 770, Retail Clerks Union, California Coordinator, Committee for Democracy in Labor Unions
- Howard B. Wyatt, Member, Local 626, Teamsters Union Executive Secretary, Committee for Democracy in Labor Unions

== Opponents ==
Opponents argued that, the "right to work" measure would jeopardize California's economy and pit employers and employees against one another during a time when there is a fluctuating national economy and international tension. The resulting tension between employers and employees would destroy industrial relations

The measure was deemed immoral and ran contrary to the U.S. democratic system. The U.S. government is based on the principle of majority rule and according to the Taft Hartley Act states that union open shop can only exist where there is majority rule because the majority of employees has chosen a single union as their bargaining agent. According to opponents of the measure union open shop is therefore “the American, democratic way” as well.

Opponents of Proposition 18 quote statistics from the U.S. Department of Commerce that reveal California's per capita income is 60 percent larger than those states who passed such “right to work” measures. Therefore, passage of the proposition would lower income and profits of all professional persons.

Opposition includes:

- President Eisenhower
- Adlai Stevenson
- Vice President Nixon
- Chief Justice Earl Warren
- Governor Goodwin J. Knight
- Attorney General Edmund G. Brown
- Benjamin H. Swig, President Fairmont Hotel Company, San Francisco
- Charles J. Smith, Director District 38, United Steelworkers of America
- C. J. Haggerty, Secretary-Treasurer California State Federation of Labor
- Church Federation of Los Angeles
- The Board of Rabbis of Southern California
- The Catholic Council on Working Life
- The Catholic Labor Institute and the National Catholic Welfare Conference
- Religious affiliates, including Catholic, Protestant, and Jewish institutions

=== Spending ===
Opponents of Prop. 18 recorded spending $1,250,000 against the measure, according to the Secretary of State's office. Their receipts totaled $1,523,653, while spending $1,241,196. Supporters of Prop. 18 recorded their receipts to total $507,053 and spending $390,419. Prop. 18 opposition outspent the supporters three to one. It was reported that General Electric was the biggest supporter of the proposition residing outside of California, with the majority being spent on advertising. The largest out-of-state check written for the opposition was by the National Council for Industrial Peace in Washington.

== Results ==
California Proposition 18 was defeated in the general elections of 1958 on November 4. The vote was 2.079.975 for (40,4%) and 3.070.837 against (59,6%).

It was defeated by the efforts of unions and civil rights groups who fought to maintain the status quo, maintaining union strength. The labor issue created a rift in the Republican Party caused by the rivalry of Governor Goodwin J. Knight and Senator William F. Knowland would create a shift in the political tide in favor of the Democrats. The liberal Democrats would remain firm and united in opposing the proposition, which would pay off with Edmund G. Brown winning the governorship of California and political control of California being held firmly in the hands of the Democratic party.
