= 1964 California Proposition 14 =

Referendum on housing discrimination

California Proposition 14 was a November 1964 initiative ballot measure that amended the California state constitution to nullify the 1963 Rumford Fair Housing Act, thereby allowing property sellers, landlords and their agents to openly discriminate on ethnic grounds when selling or letting accommodations, as they had been permitted to before 1963. The proposition became law after receiving support from 65% of voters. In 1966, the California Supreme Court in a 5–2 split decision declared Proposition 14 unconstitutional under the Equal Protection Clause of the United States Constitution (Fourteenth Amendment). The U.S. Supreme Court affirmed that decision in 1967 in Reitman v. Mulkey.

Political science research has tied white support for Proposition 14 to racial threat theory, which holds that an increase in the racial minority population triggers a fearful and discriminatory response by the dominating racial majority.

== Circumstances leading to Proposition 14 ==
As early as 1927, the California Real Estate Association (the eventual sponsor of Proposition 14) began to advise its membership in ways to keep California communities all white. This was part of a decades-long campaign by real estate interests to undercut the rights of minority groups in regard to housing facilities in California. This also included the California Real Estate Association opposing the relocation of the evacuated Japanese (during World War II) in California or anywhere on the West Coast.

=== California Real Estate Association Race Restriction Committee ===
In 1942, in response to the success of some Negroes in moving out of the Los Angeles ghetto and into traditionally all white neighborhoods, the California Real Estate Association formed its Race Restriction Committee. The purpose of the committee was to establish perpetual race restrictions on parcels of property.

=== U.S. Supreme Court decision in Shelley v. Kraemer ===
In 1948, the United States Supreme Court in Shelley v. Kraemer precluded judicial enforcement of racially restrictive housing covenants. Prior to 1948, the California Real Estate Association routinely promoted and enforced racially restrictive housing covenants to prevent family homes from ending up in the hands of minorities, particularly Negroes.

=== Support of Federal Constitutional amendment allowing racially restrictive covenants ===
Shortly following the 1948 court decision in Shelley, an item appeared in the California Real Estate magazine, a publication of the California Real Estate Association (the organization is currently named the California Association of Realtors) advocating an amendment to the United States Constitution that would overturn Shelley and constitutionally guarantee the legal enforcement of racially restrictive covenants throughout the United States.

In advocating support for a federal constitutional amendment guaranteeing the legal enforcement of racially restrictive covenants, the California Real Estate Association publication stated that "millions of home owners of the Caucasian race have constructed or acquired homes in areas restricted against occupancy by Negroes. The practice of surrounding homes in such areas with the security of such restrictions has become a traditional element of value in home ownership throughout this nation."

The publication further stated: "The recent decisions of the Supreme Court abovementioned have destroyed the values thus secured. The threat of occupancy by Negroes of property in such areas depreciates the value of all home properties and constitutes a direct deterrent to investment in the construction or acquisition of homes of superior quality whether large or small. The experience has been uniform that whenever and wherever Negroes have occupied homes in such areas this has not only depreciated values of the properties which they own, but has depreciated the values of all surrounding properties."

In further support of the constitutional amendment, the publication stated: "Moreover, the prices of homes in such areas are well within the purchasing power of vast numbers of Negroes. These circumstances greatly aggravate the hazard to which such home owners are exposed. ... Additionally, the insistence of some Negroes upon moving into areas previously restricted exclusively to the occupancy of Caucasians will necessarily create racial tensions and antagonisms and do much harm to our national social structure."

The federal constitutional amendment effort was unsuccessful, but the reasons for pursuing such an amendment provided insight into the underlying reasons for pursuing a future and similar protective state constitutional amendment in California.

=== California Real Estate Association support of 1950 California Proposition 10 ===
The California Real Estate Association also supported California Proposition 10 on the November 1950 election ballot (adding Article 34 to the California Constitution and known as the "Public Housing Project Law") which made it significantly more difficult to build low-rent housing projects in California communities. Proposition 10 had been described as a means of legally handcuffing public housing that may be greatly needed for low-income renters, including minorities.

=== Blockbusting ===
Despite the court decision in Shelley, segregation in California continued. As an example, an insidious form of segregation known as blockbusting occurred in East Palo Alto. In 1954, a white resident sold his house to a black family. Almost immediately, agents of the California Real Estate Association, including the president of the statewide real estate Association himself, began warning of a "Negro invasion" and even staged burglaries to panic white homeowners to sell at below-market prices. Those properties were then sold to Negroes at higher-than-market prices with real estate interests handsomely profiting from the transactions. These East Palo Alto houses had been priced so much higher than similar properties for white homeowners that the black homeowners had difficulty making payments which created a slum in East Palo Alto.

=== Rumford Fair Housing Act ===
The tipping point for the California Real Estate Association to pursue an initiative for a state constitutional amendment in California was the enactment of the Rumford Fair Housing Act in 1963. The Rumford Fair Housing Act was passed by the California Legislature to help end racial discrimination by property owners and landlords who refused to rent or sell their property to "colored" people. It was drafted by William Byron Rumford, the first African American from Northern California to serve in the legislature. The Act provided that landlords could not deny people housing because of ethnicity, religion, or national origin (later the law would be extended to apply to sex, marital status, physical handicap, or familial status). Future Governor Ronald Reagan opposed this and other legislative attempts to enact fair housing, but the Rumford Fair Housing Act was signed into law by Governor Pat Brown.

The California Real Estate Association had fought the Rumford Fair Housing Act "every step of the way." In the minds of California Real Estate Association leaders, the Rumford Fair Housing Act directly threatened the financial interests of the real estate industry who came to see "the promotion, preservation, and manipulation of racial segregation as central – rather than incidental or residual – components of their profit generating strategies."

The California Real Estate Association also advised its member boards that speakers from the State Fair Employment Practice Commission, the agency which enforced the Rumford Fair Housing Act, should be prevented from talking to the general real estate membership about the new law. Instead, all questions about the interpretation of the new law would come from the real estate association itself.

Following the assassination of President John Kennedy on November 22, 1963, tremendous pressure was placed on the California Real Estate Association to call off their initiative campaign to repeal the Rumford Fair Housing Act. The association instead decided to "delay a little while" to "let things simmer down."

== Proposition 14 ==
In 1964, the California Real Estate Association (currently named the California Association of Realtors) sponsored an initiative constitutional amendment to counteract the effects of the Rumford Act. A member of the State Fair Employment Practice Commission, the agency which enforced the Rumford Fair Housing Act, asserted that some members of the California Real Estate Association were promoting their initiative campaign to repeal the Rumford Fair Housing Act to continue blockbusting.

The initiative, numbered Proposition 14 when it was certified for the ballot, was to add an amendment (Cal. Const. art. I, § 26) to the constitution of California. This amendment would provide, in part, as follows:

Neither the State nor any subdivision or agency thereof shall deny, limit or abridge, directly or indirectly, the right of any person, who is willing or desires to sell, lease or rent any part or all of his real property, to decline to sell, lease or rent such property to such person or persons as he, in his absolute discretion, chooses.

In California, housing segregation was rampant as a result of decades of racially discriminatory housing policies explicitly aimed at keeping people of color confined to urban ghettos and out of the expanding suburbs. Proposition 14 attempted to re-legalize discrimination and associational privacy by landlords and property owners.

=== Ballot arguments ===
The ballot argument in favor of Proposition 14 stated that the constitutional amendment "will guarantee the right of all home and apartment owners to choose buyers and renters of their property as they wish, without interference by State or local government." The argument further stated that "most owners of such property in California lost this right through the Rumford Act of 1963. It says they may not refuse to sell or rent their property to anyone for reasons of race, color, religion, national origin, or ancestry."

The ballot argument against Proposition 14 stated that Proposition 14 "would write hate and bigotry into the Constitution." The argument further stated that Proposition 14 "would legalize and incite bigotry. At a time when our nation is moving ahead on civil rights, it proposes to convert California into another Mississippi or Alabama and to create an atmosphere for violence and hate."

=== Endorsements ===
Following much publicity the proposition gained the endorsement of many large conservative political groups, including the John Birch Society and the California Republican Assembly. As these and other groups endorsed the proposal it became increasingly popular and the petition to have the proposition added to the ballot garnered over one million signatures. This was more than twice the 480,000 signatures that were required.

==== Endorsements by racist groups ====
Other supporters of Proposition 14 included the American Nazi Party and local branches of the White Citizens' Councils, a network of white supremacist, segregationist organizations. The National States' Rights Party, a white supremacist political party having the slogan "White Men Unite," also supported Proposition 14.

The statewide director of the campaign against Proposition 14 asked the California Real Estate Association to repudiate the White Citizens' Council's support of Proposition 14, but the California Real Estate Association, acting through its president, refused to do so. In response to this refusal, Rev. H. H. Brookins, chairman of the United Civil Rights Committee, said: "It no longer is possible for proponents of Proposition 14 to hide their real intention, which is to legalize segregation in housing. By refusing to repudiate support of a local Mississippi-based racist group, the California Real Estate Association had admitted its concern is not with property rights – it is to destroy human rights."

Other opponents of Proposition 14, including the AFL-CIO Los Angeles County Labor Federation, also demanded that the California Real Estate Association fire its Southern California publicity director who had written extensively for the White Citizens' Council magazine, and who stated during a campaign town hall meeting in Los Angeles: "The people have the right to discriminate if they want to." The president of the California Real Estate Association had recently claimed that realtors were against anything smacking of prejudice against minorities.

==== Los Angeles Times endorsement ====
In endorsing Proposition 14, the Los Angeles Times stated: "One of man’s most ancient rights in a free society is the privilege of using and disposing of his private property in whatever manner he deems appropriate." The editorial further stated: "But we do feel, and strongly, that housing equality cannot safely be achieved at the expense of still another basic right." According to the Los Angeles Times, the ability to discriminate against home buyers or renters by race, color, and creed was considered a "basic property right."

In a letter-to-the-editor response to the Times' endorsement of Proposition 14, then-California Attorney General Stanley Mosk stated: "I oppose the segregation initiative. I oppose it because it sugar-coats bigotry with an appeal to generalities we can accept, while ignoring the specific problem that confronts us."

=== Heated campaign ===
The Proposition 14 campaign was heated and included several controversial comments from Edmund Brown who was the Governor of California at the time. Governor Brown stated that passage of Proposition 14 would put into California's Constitution "a provision for discrimination of which not even Mississippi or Alabama can boast." Previously, Governor Brown had likened the campaign for Proposition 14 to "another hate binge which began more than 30 years ago in a Munich beer hall." In a letter to the editor response to several items published in the Los Angeles Times relating to Proposition 14, Governor Brown wrote: “I submit that it is not the Governor who is inflammatory. It is Proposition 14. And I submit that it is not the opponents of Proposition 14 who encourage the racists and bigots in this state, but those who support Proposition 14.”

Martin Luther King Jr. visited California on multiple occasions to campaign against Proposition 14, saying its passage would be "one of the most shameful developments in our nation’s history."

=== Election results ===
Proposition 14 appeared on the November 3, 1964, general election ballot in California. The ballot proposition passed with 65.39% support, receiving 4,526,460 votes in support and 2,395,747 votes against.

==== Results by county ====
The final election results by county for Proposition 14 from the Statement of Vote were as follows:

Results by county: Yes: 70–80%; 60–70%; 50–60%; No: 50–60%

County	Yes	No	Total	Yes %	Outcome
Alameda	253,380	164,736	418,116	60.60	Pass
Alpine	127	66	193	65.80	Pass
Amador	3,122	1,711	4,833	64.60	Pass
Butte	27,578	12,204	39,782	69.32	Pass
Calaveras	3,686	1,494	5,180	71.16	Pass
Colusa	2,699	1,696	4,395	61.41	Pass
Contra Costa	118,313	64,712	183,025	64.64	Pass
Del Norte	3,217	1,913	5,130	62.71	Pass
El Dorado	9,904	4,396	14,300	69.26	Pass
Fresno	86,636	45,748	132,384	65.44	Pass
Glenn	4,662	2,335	6,997	66.63	Pass
Humboldt	20,867	15,552	36,419	57.30	Pass
Imperial	13,723	6,319	20,042	68.47	Pass
Inyo	3,987	1,647	5,634	70.77	Pass
Kern	76,510	30,114	106,624	71.76	Pass
Kings	11,105	6,908	18,013	61.65	Pass
Lake	5,828	2,371	8,199	71.08	Pass
Lassen	3,412	2,457	5,869	58.14	Pass
Los Angeles	1,802,620	870,342	2,672,962	67.44	Pass
Madera	8,921	4,224	13,145	67.87	Pass
Marin	38,667	35,450	74,117	52.17	Pass
Mariposa	1,912	923	2,835	67.44	Pass
Mendocino	10,110	7,360	17,470	57.87	Pass
Merced	16,409	10,572	26,981	60.82	Pass
Modoc	1,536	1,555	3,091	49.69	Fail
Mono	1,117	312	1,429	78.17	Pass
Monterey	36,753	26,590	63,343	58.02	Pass
Napa	22,403	8,286	30,689	73.00	Pass
Nevada	7,668	3,334	11,002	69.70	Pass
Orange	312,933	89,190	402,123	77.82	Pass
Placer	17,053	10,027	27,080	62.97	Pass
Plumas	3,185	2,311	5,496	57.95	Pass
Riverside	95,734	43,861	139,595	68.58	Pass
Sacramento	139,018	86,777	225,795	61.57	Pass
San Benito	3,281	2,657	5,938	55.25	Pass
San Bernardino	150,680	59,787	210,467	71.59	Pass
San Diego	296,994	124,670	421,664	70.43	Pass
San Francisco	165,155	147,151	312,306	52.88	Pass
San Joaquin	60,601	32,460	93,061	65.12	Pass
San Luis Obispo	23,209	12,603	35,812	64.81	Pass
San Mateo	129,480	85,525	215,005	60.22	Pass
Santa Barbara	52,801	32,059	84,860	62.22	Pass
Santa Clara	168,684	149,153	317,837	53.07	Pass
Santa Cruz	26,146	18,518	44,664	58.54	Pass
Shasta	14,341	13,050	27,391	52.36	Pass
Sierra	694	466	1,160	59.83	Pass
Siskiyou	7,013	6,401	13,414	52.28	Pass
Solano	34,606	15,041	49,647	69.70	Pass
Sonoma	43,207	26,726	69,933	61.78	Pass
Stanislaus	39,510	23,578	63,088	62.63	Pass
Sutter	10,040	3,647	13,687	73.35	Pass
Tehama	6,370	4,668	11,038	57.71	Pass
Trinity	1,765	1,461	3,226	54.71	Pass
Tulare	35,704	18,664	54,368	65.67	Pass
Tuolumne	4,807	2,642	7,449	64.53	Pass
Ventura	63,964	32,983	96,947	65.98	Pass
Yolo	14,412	11,157	25,569	56.37	Pass
Yuba	8,201	3,187	11,388	72.01	Pass
Total	4,526,460	2,395,747	6,922,207	65.39	PASS

=== Election aftermath ===
Shortly following the successful Proposition 14 election, the president of the National Association of Real Estate Boards declared that private property rights were more basic to human liberty than the civil rights of minority groups.

=== Election analysis ===
A 2018 study in the American Political Science Review found that white voters in areas which experienced massive African-American population growth between 1940 and 1960 were more likely to vote for Proposition 14. Political scientists have taken this as evidence for "racial threat theory", which holds that the rapid increase in a minority population triggers fears among the majority race population, leading the majority to impose higher levels of social control on the subordinate race.

== Unconstitutionality ==
Soon after Proposition 14 was passed, the federal government cut off all housing funds to California. Many also cited the proposition as one of the causes of the Watts Riots of 1965.

With the federal housing funds cut off and with the support of Governor Pat Brown, the constitutionality of the measure was challenged soon afterward. In 1966, the California Supreme Court did not consider whether Proposition 14 was unconstitutional because it violated the equal protection and due process provisions of the California Constitution; instead, it held that Proposition 14 violated the Equal Protection Clause of the Fourteenth Amendment to the federal Constitution. Gov. Brown's stance proved controversial; later in 1966, he was defeated in his bid for re-election by Ronald Reagan. However, Reagan opposed both Proposition 14 and the Rumford Act, and stated that Proposition 14 was "not a wise measure." Reagan labeled the Rumford Act as an attempt "to give one segment of our population a right at the expense of the basic rights of all our citizens."

However, the case continued. The U.S. Supreme Court affirmed the California Supreme Court's decision in Reitman v. Mulkey (1967), holding that Proposition 14 was invalid because it violated the equal protection clause. The proposition was repealed by Proposition 7 in the November 1974 election.

Reitman established a significant precedent because it held that state assistance or encouragement of private discrimination violated the equal protection guarantee of the Fourteenth Amendment.

Even following the U.S. Supreme Court decision in Reitman, the California Real Estate Association was looking for ways to continue engaging in housing discrimination by evading the high court decision.

== Additional ballot measures by the real estate industry ==
Similar to Proposition 14, there have been subsequent efforts by the real estate industry to promote ballot measures in California to generate more profits at the alleged expense of minorities. Examples include the unsuccessful 2018 California Proposition 5 and 2020 California Proposition 19, which has been criticized for not helping first-time homeowners who are disproportionately minorities and for reinforcing racial inequity within California's tax system.
