= Discontinuity effect =

Concept in group dynamics

The discontinuity effect is known as the markedly greater competitiveness displayed between different, interacting groups relative to the competitiveness displayed when individuals interact with other individuals. Given that group competition over scarce resources is believed to lead to group-level conflict (see realistic group conflict theory), it has been asserted that the link between competition and conflict is also considerably more powerful between groups than between individuals. While individuals within a group may prefer to be cooperative, once they join together to make a collective unit, individual orientations favoring cooperation tend to be overshadowed by competitive orientations of the group.

The discontinuity between individuals and groups has been consistently replicated in laboratory settings, but are not confined to them. These effects emerge during sports activities, sessions of classes, and even when groups merge to plan or strategize (Forsyth, 2010).

== Causes ==
The discontinuity effect is consistent, which suggests that it emerges due to a number of causes, which may ultimately combine to intensify inter-group conflict. These causes are greed, anonymity, fear, ingroup favoritism, and diffusion of responsibility.

- Greed: First of all, when individuals congregate to form groups, they typically become more greedy. This change in disposition develops as group members realize and discover that they are in similar pursuit of maximizing group- level gains and are therefore in competition with other groups to achieve them. This social support then spurs the group members onto smaller levels of greed.
- Fear: People tend to fear aggregations of individuals (i.e., groups) more than they fear individuals in singularity. Groups are described as more abrasive, competitive, and aggressive, and also less agreeable, cooperative, and trustworthy. In extreme cases, this general distrust may lead to intergroup paranoia, which is the belief held by members of one group that they will be mistreated by members of a malevolent outgroup.
- Ingroup favoritism: Group members may feel pressure to do what they can to maximize a group’s collective outcomes and maintain a sense of group duty. This is the sense that as being a part of (or leader of) a group is to do what increases group achievements, even if it comes at a cost to an outside group.
- Diffusion of responsibility: This is a phenomenon whereby a person is less likely to take responsibility for an action or inaction while others are present, and it has been shown to contribute to the discontinuity effect. Individual group members may feel that others are either responsible for taking action, or have already done so, and therefore are not ultimately responsible for their actions within a group setting.

== See also ==
- Conflict resolution
- Group conflict
