= Carolyn Sherif =

American psychologist (1922–1982)

Carolyn Wood Sherif
- Born: June 26, 1922; Loogootee, Indiana
- Died: July 23, 1982 (aged 60); State College, Pennsylvania
- Education: (1943) B.A. Purdue University highest distinction (1944) M.A. State University of Iowa (1961) Ph.D. University of Texas
- Known for: Social judgment theory Realistic conflict theory following Robber's Cave Experiment; Self-system concept Gender identity research Psychology of women research
- Scientific career
- Fields: Social psychology
- Workplaces: Pennsylvania State University 1966-1982; Smith College 1979–80; Cornell University 1969–70
- Doctoral advisor: Wayne H. Holtzman

Carolyn Wood Sherif (1922–1982) was an American social psychologist who helped to develop social judgment theory and contributed pioneering research in the areas of the self-system, group conflict, cooperation, and gender identity. She also assumed a leading role in psychology both nationally as well as internationally. In addition to performing seminal social psychology research, Wood Sherif devoted herself to teaching her students and was recognized for her efforts with an American Psychological Association award named in her honor that is presented annually.

== Early and personal life ==
She was born Carolyn Wood on 26 June 1922, the youngest of three children of Bonny Williams and Lawrence Anselm Wood, in Loogootee, Indiana. In 1945, she married a fellow psychologist, Turkish-American Muzafer Sherif, with whom she had three children: Sue, Joan, and Ann Sherif.

== Death ==
In July 1982, Carolyn Wood Sherif died of cancer at age 60 in State College, Pennsylvania.

== Education ==
Wood Sherif graduated from West Lafayette High School in 1940.

=== Undergraduate ===
Wood Sherif earned a Bachelor of Science from Purdue University in 1943 with the highest distinction in an experimental program developed for women science majors that focused on studying the sciences within humanist and historical perspectives. While Wood Sherif took classes in the sciences and mathematics, she had little exposure to psychology during her undergraduate studies. Instead, Wood Sherif later wrote that several experiences together inspired her to pursue a career in social psychology. First, the United States Department of the Treasury distributed a play she wrote in Junior year to community programs encouraging the sale of war bonds, prompting Wood Sherif to wonder about the ways her play would affect its audiences. She received encouragement from a professor to pursue these questions through research in the field of social psychology. Secondly, inspiration to study social psychology came in part from her amazement at the sudden shift in the American public's attitude from isolationism to support for World War II (Indeed, this amazement led her to investigate attitudes throughout her career as a central topic in her research.) Lastly, she also had a strong desire to better the world, and because of these experiences, she decided to pursue a career in social psychology in order to accomplish this goal.

=== Graduate ===
With this goal in mind, Wood Sherif went on to obtain a master's degree from the University of Iowa in 1944 in social psychology under Wendell Johnson where she performed her first research on attitudinal constructs and also worked with Leon Yarrow to investigate how people respond to perspectives that are counter to their own. While working on her master's thesis examining how racially biased attitudes affect serial recall in a laboratory task, Wood Sherif read The Psychology of Social Norms (1936), written by Muzafer Sherif. This book had a profound effect on her as she saw many of her own scientific interests reflected in its chapters. She announced to her peers and professors that Sherif was "the kind of social psychologist that I [Carolyn] want to be."

In 1944, following the completion of her master's, Wood Sherif went to work as a psychology researcher for Audience Research Inc., at Princeton. After a short employment, Wood Sherif left the survey research field (she quickly became dissatisfied with the research she was asked to perform analyzing data on potential Hollywood movies). She decided instead to return to graduate studies, and applied for a research assistant position with Muzafer Sherif at Princeton University, which initiated their career-long professional collaboration. In addition to a productive work relationship, Carolyn and Muzafer developed a personal relationship that culminated in their marriage in December 1945.

Carolyn and Muzafer faced special difficulties in their marriage. In addition to the normal stressors of married life, they came from drastically different backgrounds (Muzafer was raised in Turkey) and were in different stages in their professional lives. However, Sherif had decided that she wanted to have a marriage of equals where her career ambitions would be supported. She characterizes this as a desire based on fictional portrayals and not reflected in the reality of any of the relationships she observed. When she met Sherif, Carolyn Wood felt that she had found a way to achieve her dream. Muzafer Sherif was an outspoken believer in equal rights for women and fully supported Wood Sherif's goal of realizing a successful research career. However, because Princeton (where Muzafer was then working) did not accept women as graduate students until 1961, Wood Sherif commuted to Columbia University for classes for graduate education.

Wood Sherif also actively engaged in conducting research and writing books with Sherif during this period, but she was frequently denied appropriate credit for her work because she did not have a PhD or a position at any university. When their joint work was solely attributed to Muzafer, Sherif notes that Muzafer's indignant reaction to this injustice, equal to her own, helped temper the blow. In an attempt to remedy this situation, after the births of the three Sherif children, Wood Sherif returned to graduate school as a full-time student at the University of Texas in 1958. In 1961, Wood Sherif completed her PhD under Wayne Holtzman at this university. Her dissertation culminated in the published paper "Social Categorization as a function of Latitude of Acceptance and Series Range", which assessed the different ranges of positions on a topic that different individuals found acceptable, examined how an individual's range of acceptability changed depending on the range of the stimuli being labeled as acceptable or not, and how these two factors in turn affected the behavior of social categorization.

=== Post-graduate ===
Between 1961 and 1965, Wood Sherif and Sherif published four books together, including the culmination of their Robber's Cave Experiment data. Wood Sherif is first author on the final of these books published in 1965, Attitude and Attitude Change: The Social Judgement-Involvement Approach, which presented the social judgment theory of persuasion. Following this highly productive period, both Wood Sherif and Sherif were offered tenure-track positions at Pennsylvania State University. Wood Sherif subsequently had visiting professor positions at Cornell University (1969–1970) and Smith College (1979–1980), but she remained a professor at Pennsylvania State University until her death in 1982.

Wood Sherif also devoted herself to teaching, creating both undergraduate and graduate courses at Pennsylvania State University to address issues in social psychology. Furthermore, she was influential in the development of social psychology courses pertaining to women, creating the first women's studies course during her visiting year at Cornell University and a women and psychology course for Pennsylvania State University.

== Contributions to social psychology ==
Wood Sherif contributed to many areas of social psychology through her own broad research interests and her encouragement to her students to study whatever topics they found most compelling, instead of solely the topics on which she had already performed research. As both a dedicated researcher and mentor, Carolyn made significant contributions to areas including leadership studies, gender identity, attitude, sports psychology, and persuasion.

=== Robber's Cave Experiment and realistic conflict theory ===
In what is now considered a classic study in social psychology, Sherif and Wood Sherif examined intergroup hostility by observing 22 eleven-year-old boys over the course of an elaborate experimental summer camp setup where the boys were divided into two arbitrary groups, put into conflict and competition, and then integrated through cooperative tasks. The Sheriffs concluded from this experiment that groups come into conflict and negative attitudes towards the outgroup arise when groups compete for limited resources that only one group may ultimately claim (e.g. prizes during summer camp competitions in the experiment). Furthermore, contact with an outgroup is insufficient to reduce the negative attitude if no other measures are taken. Instead, negative attitudes can be reduced and positive intergroup relations can occur if both groups are required to unite and cooperate in order to achieve a goal. This study provided important empirical support for the realistic conflict theory, which outlines each of these experimental conclusions as its own theoretical arguments. This study also informed scientific understanding of the origin of prejudiced attitudes that arise from group conflict and how these negative attitudes may in turn be diminished to promote intergroup harmony.

==== Competition and sports psychology ====
Wood Sherif later translated her expertise in group formation and competition to the emerging field of sports psychology. Her definition of "competition" as a social process based on her work with the Robber's Cave Experiment became a standard for the new field that is still cited:

Competition is a social process that occurs when a person's activities are directed more or less consistently toward meeting a standard or achieving a goal in which performance, either by the individual or by the group, is compared and evaluated relative to that of selected other persons or groups.

She also emphasized the role of motivation in competitive performance, instead of simply the ability to compete, writing that "the quality and persistence in competition depends upon...the significance [of the activity] to the child" or other competitor. She noted that the social environment could significantly affect the level of motivation an individual would have to perform in a given competitive process. In particular, she contributed a seminal article on women in sports, "Females and the competitive process" detailing the effects of the social environment on women's motivation and performance in sports. In addition to talks at several sports psychology conferences, she was invited to speak to the Scientific Congress held before the 1972 Olympic Games on this topic (as the only female speaker to present).

=== Social judgment theory ===
Wood Sherif outlined a seminal theory of attitude change in Attitude and Attitude Change (1965). In this work, Wood Sherif outlined social judgment theory, relating the involvement of the individual (the self) to situations of persuasion. She argued that audiences judge persuasive messages by the degree to which the messages agree or disagree with their own attitudes. People compare their attitudes with those of others using "latitudes of acceptence [sic?], rejection, and noncommitment." That is, individuals have their own position on a topic, but also maintain a range, or latitude, or other related attitudes on that topic that they accept, a latitude of attitudes that they reject as inappropriate, and a latitude of attitudes that they neither support nor find objectionable. These three latitudes together characterize an individual's attitude toward any topic. Furthermore, social judgment theory states that the greater the latitude of rejection for an individual (the more positions they object to outside of their own), the more involved that person is assumed to be with that topic (i.e. the stronger their attitude towards the topic), and the harder it will be to persuade them to change their attitude.

==== The self-system ====
Additionally, Wood Sherif presented the conceptual framework of a "self-system," an organized collection of attitudes that has been molded by an individual's interactions with the social environment (e.g. family, religious institutions). The self-system provides the organizational schema by which an individual relates parts of themselves to significant individuals, groups, or institutions in their social environment. Wood Sherif emphasized that studies of specific attitudes must account for this overarching self-system organization of attitudes when interpreting results (i.e. any attitude exists within the framework of the self-system and must be interpreted in relation to this individual's organization of attitudes). Furthermore, Wood Sherif argued that as individuals develop these organized attitudes towards the social world, their self-system alters their perception of other people's attitudes, so that similarities and differences to others' attitudes are exaggerated for an individual. This approach was important for clarifying seemingly contradictory results in attitude change research that focused only on individual attitudes. The importance of this approach to studying attitudes was noted by Shaffer and Shields in their review:

This approach was the only theory of attitudes that attempted to integrate the study of specific attitudes with the overall structure of the self-system...as individuals make personal commitments, they develop their own categories for perceiving the social world. The result is usually to systematically distort others' positions on social issues by assimilating near their own and contrasting to others.

This book outlining social judgment theory and the self-system concept became one of Wood Sherif's most widely recognized contributions to social psychology.

=== Gender identity and psychology of women ===
Wood Sherif was an active member in the APA, in division 35 which was dedicated to the Psychology of Women. She was the program chair for the 1978 APA program and the division President from 1979 to 1980. She made numerous contributions in this time through her published research articles on a variety of women's topics including: gender bias in research, gender identity, gender role, reproduction and sociology.

Wood Sherif applied her concept of the self-system in pioneering research on gender identity that culminated in the publication of her other best-known book, Orientation in Social Psychology, in 1976, and her presidential address to the American Psychological Association (Division 35-Psychology of Women) as the head of that division in 1980. In these works, she states that gender is a sociological construct (a set of organized social categories) with both biological and cultural determinants. She argues that research on gender identity needs to account for the fact that individuals are aware of the gender categories within their culture and maintain a psychological relationship with this categorization; that is, their self-systems are influenced by this aspect of the social environment. So, according to Wood Sherif, psychologists need to understand the gender categories and their organization in their own culture before they can perform meaningful studies of gender identity.

She further argued for the use of the self-system concept in gender identity studies instead of simply relying on a single self-report question. To truly understand a person's gender identity, she insisted that scientists needed to understand how that individual related different parts of their identity to different aspects of their social environment. This method of assessing gender identity would allow scientists to examine novel questions about cohesion and fragmentation of an individual's gender identity depending on how an individual's different social stimuli generate different attitudes about their gender. For example, a woman might be treated equally to men in her group of friends, but she might also feel her gender is inferior if she adheres to a religious institution that holds that attitude. Therefore, Wood Sherif argued that understanding an individual's reference groups, the important elements of their social environment that are a part of that person's self-system, would be crucial to understanding that person's complex gender identity and explaining their attitudes. She argued that accounting for the complexities in gender identity using this self-system approach could help explain the seemingly contradictory results obtained from studies using simple self-report measures or those that focused only on single attitudes.

==== Gender stereotyping ====
In addition, Wood Sherif addressed the issue of whether these gender categories inherently lead to a gender hierarchy and gender stereotyping within a culture by referencing her work on the Robber's Cave experiment. She argued that individuals could prefer their own category without necessarily holding negative attitudes towards those in another category if both groups are considered equal and must work interdependently to achieve goals (in the same way that cooperation between the two groups of boys in the experiment removed their negative attitudes towards each other). She emphasized that it is not the degree of difference or similarity between two groups that leads to negative outgroup attitudes like gender stereotyping, but instead this nature of the relationship between the two groups. She suggested that negative stereotyping of the female gender therefore occurred because of the power differential in this relationship between males and females in American society.

==== Social power and social status ====
Lastly, she argued that the social psychological definition of "social power" at that time, which was interpreted in terms of social persuasion abilities, did not accurately describe social power because social power and social persuasion were instead two separate concepts. A group with little social power could still be very persuasive (e.g. acting helpless to get assistance), so Wood Sherif rejected the definition that combined the two concepts. Instead, she argued that the power of the groups relative to each other had to be taken into account first without assessing persuasive abilities by instead examining relative control of resources and other people. She then argued that attitude and persuasion researchers should instead consider differences in "social status," which she defined as the combination of social power and social position. She stated that the social status of a poor, black woman was very different from the social status of a wealthy, white woman, which in turn was very different from a wealthy white man. Therefore, she advocated that attitude and persuasion studies examine social status in terms of gender, social class, ethnic group, and family for each individual. Only after understanding this social status differential with respect to these different levels (from gender to family) did Wood Sherif believe scientists could then understand differences in social persuasion strategies between groups.

=== Selected publications ===
- An Outline of Social Psychology. Rev. ed. New York: Harper, 1956. (with M. Sherif.)
- Attitude and Attitude Change: The Social Judgment-Involvement Approach. New York: Greenwood Press, 1981. (with M. Sherif and R. E. Nebergall.)
- Attitude, Ego-Involvement, and Change. New York: Wiley, 1967. (with M. Sherif.)
- Groups in Harmony and Tension: An Integration of Studies on Intergroup Relations. Harper's Psychological Series. New York: Harper, 1953. )with M. Sherif.)
- Interdisciplinary Relationships in the Social Sciences. Chicago: Aldine, 1969. )with M. Sherif.
- Intergroup Conflict and Cooperation: The Robbers Cave Experiment. Norman: University of Oklahoma Book Exchange, 1961. (with M. Sherif, O. J. Harvey, B. J. White, and W. R. Hood.)
- Orientation in Social Psychology. New York: Harper & Row, 1976.
- Problems of Youth: Transition to Adulthood in a Changing World. Modern Applications in Psychology. Chicago: Aldine, 1965. (with M. Sherif.)
- Reference Groups: Exploration into Conformity and Deviation of Adolescents. New York: Harper & Row, 1964. (with M. Sherif.)
- Social Psychology. New York: Harper & Row, 1969. (with M. Sherif.)

Note: Carolyn's work often went unnoticed, due to the fame of her husband, Muzafer Sherif, and her delay in obtaining a doctorate degree. Many of these works cite Carolyn as a co-author or editor, some due to "corrections" of authorship made later which would list her husband as first author. In Carolyn's own words:

In several instances, when Muzafer asked me to appear as co-author, instead of in footnote or preface, I declined, a tendency that persisted into the 1960s. I would not do so again. I now believe that the world which views me as a wife who probably typed her husbands' papers (which I did not) defined me to myself more than I realized. (Vegega & Signorella, 1990; p.286)

=== Awards and distinctions ===
Wood Sherif received many awards and distinctions for her work. In addition to serving as the president for the American Psychological Association's division on the psychology of women in 1980, she received the Association for Women in Psychology's Distinguished Publication award in 1981. She also received an award for her contributions to psychology education in 1982. She was appointed the editor of the Journal of Social Issues as well, but due to her sudden death in July 1982, she was not able to receive this honor.

== Carolyn Wood Sherif Award ==
In response to the significant contributions Wood Sherif made to the field of Psychology of Women, APA Division 35: Society for the Psychology of Women sponsors the Carolyn Wood Sherif Award, awarded annually to those who exemplify excellence in the field of psychology of women with regards to professional leadership, mentoring/teaching, and research/scholarship.
