= Los Angeles Uprising =

Los Angeles Uprising may refer to:

- Watts riots in 1965
- 1992 Los Angeles riots
