= Amity–enmity complex =

Term introduced by Sir Arthur Keith

The amity–enmity complex theory was introduced by Sir Arthur Keith in his work A New Theory of Human Evolution (1948). He posited that humans evolved as differing races, tribes, and cultures, exhibiting patriotism, morality, leadership and nationalism. Those who belong are part of the in-group, and tolerated; all others are classed as out-group, and subject to hostility: "The code of enmity is a necessary part of the machinery of evolution. He who feels generous towards his enemy... has given up his place in the turmoil of evolutionary competition."

Conscience in humans evolved a duality: to protect and save friends, and also to hate and fight enemies. Keith's work summarized earlier opinions on human tribalism by Charles Darwin, Alfred Russel Wallace, and Herbert Spencer.

== Case studies ==
1. United States; racial segregation: Keith suggested that racial segregation imposed by Jim Crow laws was a 'vast experiment' in which ten million “coloreds” were 'marked off (in 1948) from the rest by a frontier as sharply defined and jealously guarded as the frontiers of a kingdom'.
2. Apartheid in South Africa: White 'dominance' was 'deeply seated in the primitive organization of the Human brain.' Keith alleged that Boer and British settlers both agree 'there is an impassable frontier between them and the native races of Africa and Asia'.
3. Jews in Europe: 'The Jews maintain a racial frontier (in 1948), such as dominant races surround themselves with; they carry themselves as if racially distinct...the Jewish frontier may be strengthened by the faith which is (sic) the standard of the race.' Keith alleged that Jews had a 'dual code; conduct towards their fellows is based on amity, that to all outside their circle is based on enmity. The use of the dual code is the mark of an evolving race.'
4. The Indian caste system.
5. The dhimmi status imposed on non-muslims in areas submitted to islamic law.
6. Peter Corning cites: Shia versus Sunni, Catholic versus Protestant, the American Civil War and World War I as further examples of this 'syndrome'.

== Disruption ==
The amity–enmity complex maintains 'tribal spirit' and thus unity, of the community, 'as long as personal contact between its members is possible.' If the community grows beyond this limitation, then disruption, swarming and disintegration occur. Modern mass communication enables communities 'of 100 million' to remain intact.

== Cyclical effect ==
Keith expressed regret that this phenomenon, which explains so much, had not become common knowledge: "[W]e eternally experience the misery... of each new manifestation of the complex, then invent some new 'ism' to categorize this behavior as an evil, dealing with a common behavioral trait piecemeal [instead of] finally grasping and understanding the phenomenon."

== Modern examples of tribal instinct ==
Colleges, sports teams, churches, trades unions, female fashions and political parties enable people to exhibit tribal loyalty within large, mass-communicating nations. 'In politics we have to take sides.' But all these 'petty manifestations' are cast aside in time of war. Bismarck, Abraham Lincoln and Lloyd George are cited as statesmen who knew how to exploit the tribal spirit for political ends.

== In later works ==
According to Peter Bowler, Konrad Lorenz, Robert Ardrey and Desmond Morris were successors to Keith in promoting the 'anthropology of aggression' theory. Ardrey pointed out that similar behavior can be observed in most primates, especially baboons and chimps. "Nationalism as such is no more than a human expression of the animal drive to maintain and defend a territory... the mentality of the single Germanic tribe under Hitler differed in no way from that of early man or late baboon."

The amity–enmity complex is a serious obstacle to world peace and world government, and may even lead to nuclear holocaust: "How can we get along without war?... if we fail to get along without war, the future will be as lacking in human problems as it will be remarkably lacking in men."

Desmond Morris makes a prescriptive point: "We must try to step outside our groups and look down on human battlefields with the unbiased eye of a hovering Martian." And he warns that "the truly violent species all appear to have exterminated themselves, a lesson we should not overlook." The inherited aggression of the amity–enmity rivalry between communities is rationalized under a "persistent cloak of ideology... a matter of ideals, moral principles, social philosophies or religious beliefs.... [O]nly an immense amount of intellectual restraint will save the situation."

After World War II, a debate about the place of instinct and learning (the nature-versus-nurture debate) has occurred. According to Steven Pinker, the "bitter lessons of lynchings, world wars, and the Holocaust" have caused "prevailing theories of mind" to be "refashioned to make racism and sexism as untenable as possible. The doctrine of the blank slate became entrenched in intellectual life."

Pinker makes the point that "conflicts of interest are inherent to the human condition." Man is a product of nature, as much as malarial mosquitoes; both "are doing exactly what evolution designed them to do, even if the outcome makes people suffer... [We] cannot call their behavior pathological... [T]he belief that violence is an aberration is dangerous."

== Objections to the theory ==
Research by Dian Fossey and Jane Goodall raised awareness of a gentler side to the great apes in opposition to the 'anthropology of aggression' theory, but 'both sides of the debate were working with limited models of ape behaviour'.

== See also ==
- Asabiyyah
- Historic recurrence
- History of evolutionary thought
- Ideocracy
- Ideology
- Kafir, Takfir
- Realistic conflict theory
- Social Darwinism
- State collapse
