= Group threat theory =

Group threat theory, also known as group position theory, is a sociological theory that proposes the larger the size of an outgroup, the more the corresponding ingroup perceives it to threaten its own interests, resulting in the ingroup members having more negative attitudes toward the outgroup. It is based on the work of Herbert Blumer and Hubert M. Blalock Jr. in the 1950s and 1960s, and has since been supported by multiple studies. Other studies have not found support for the theory. Its predictions are contrary to those of the contact hypothesis, which posits that greater proximity between racial/ethnic groups under appropriate conditions can effectively reduce prejudice between majority and minority group members.

== Origins of research ==
=== Herbert Blumer's Race Prejudice as a Sense of Group Position ===
While heading the department of Sociology at the University of California, Berkeley, Blumer wrote a paper on "Race Prejudice as a Sense of Group Position". Blumer posited that racial prejudice primarily comes from the relative position of an in-group and out-group rather than individual perceptions of certain races. He investigated the four types of feelings which he said are prevalent in the dominant group within racial prejudice, which include feelings of: 1) superiority, 2) foreign and intrinsic differences in subordinate races, 3) proprietary claim of advantages and privileges in the majority, and 4) fear in the taking of prerogatives from the dominant race. Upon concluding his paper, he noted the implications of continuing to understand and explore the group position in tackling the origins of racial bias.

=== Hubert M. Blalock Jr.'s Toward A Theory of Minority-Group Relations ===
As a professor from the University of Washington, Blalock studied the relations between ethnic groups which seemingly had a majority-minority group dynamic and observed their interactions and relationships. Through his findings, Blalock further established the racial threat theory, which refers to when a minority-ethnicity group is growing faster than the majority-ethnicity, it leads to the majority-ethnicity group forcing social control over the minority-ethnicity group. He brought to focus three main forms of threat perceived by the majority population: economic threat, which includes the loss of jobs or opportunities, political threat, which involves the fear of giving up political control to minority groups, and symbolic threats, which bring about esteemed symbols in minority populations. His studies dealt with various different races, but focused mainly upon Negro-white relations with references to other ethnic groups such as the Jews and the Union of South Africa. The empirical studies showed a consistency in the perception of threat found in individuals of the majority groups, leading to responses of violence and discrimination in efforts to maintain their own security.

== Further findings ==
The group threat theory was not only found prevalent in the United States, but also included in a much wider intercultural scale. Studies within a European context found similar results that related to socio-economic and political standing rather than solely racial differences in groups. There was found to be a relation between the identity which people identified with, in terms of the majority- or minority-group, and the effects of the group threat theory they felt. The study also focused on observing immigrants and citizens as majority- or minority-groups.

On the other hand, studies have also shown that those in majority-groups who have had more contact with minority-group individuals have shown tendencies of lower feelings of threat. Approachability was found more common in a study on the contact hypothesis on Black Anti-Semitism with individuals who have had at least one contact with those of the minority demographic. It was also found that within criminal prosecutions with majority-groups against minority-group defendants, that there was no significance in the threats found by majority-groups and more people did not find a connection between a prosecution and a minority-race.

In an extended study, the effects of the group threat theory due to stereotype threats were measured by performance in the work place. It was found that the prevalence of stereotype threat imposed by majority groups led to lower performance scores in jobs, in studies specifically on African-American workers. Performance scores the difference between scores of the majority racio-ethnic groups and the minority racio-ethnic groups tended to be lower without the presence of the stereotype threats imposed by the majority. There were observations on the possible effects of the group threat theory on the minority-group, rather than just noticing the presence of differences caused by group threat.

== See also ==
- Contact hypothesis
- Racial threat
- Realistic conflict theory
