= Watts riots =

1965 riots in Los Angeles, United States

- Part of the Ghetto riots of the 1960s
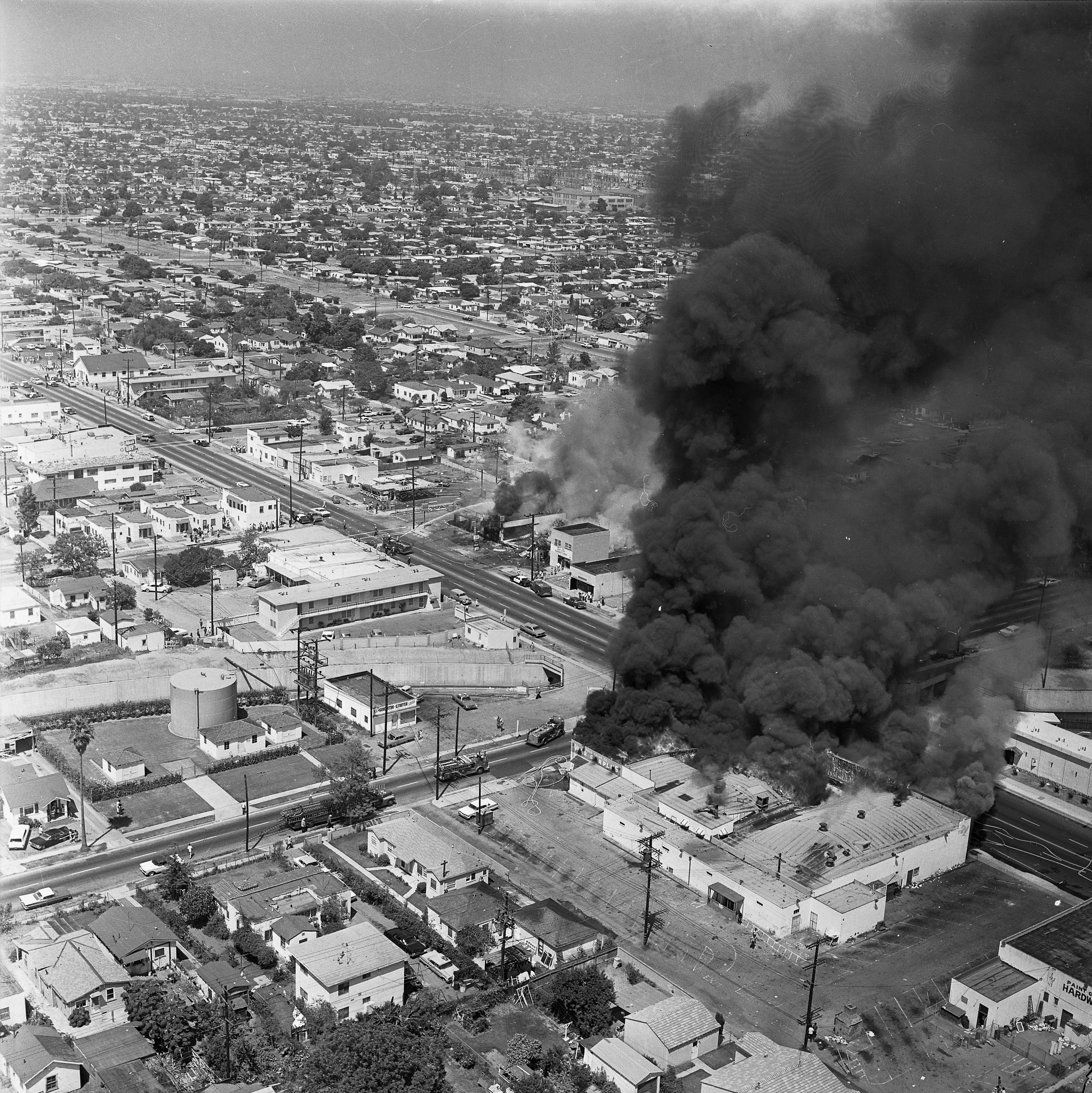
- Two buildings on fire on Avalon Boulevard
- Date: August 11–16, 1965 (5 days)
- Location: Watts, Los Angeles
- Goals: To end mistreatment by the police and to end discrimination in housing, employment, and schooling systems
- Methods: Widespread rioting, looting, assault, arson, protests, fires being set, and property damage

Casualties
- Deaths: 34
- Injuries: 1,032
- Arrested: 3,438

The Watts riots, sometimes referred to as the Watts Rebellion or Watts Uprising, took place in the Watts neighborhood and its surrounding areas of Los Angeles from August 11 to 16, 1965. The riots were motivated by anger at the racist and abusive practices of the Los Angeles Police Department, as well as grievances over employment discrimination, residential segregation, and poverty in L.A.

On August 11, 1965, Marquette Frye, a 21-year-old black man, was pulled over for drunk driving. After he failed a field sobriety test, officers attempted to arrest him. Marquette resisted arrest, with assistance from his mother, Rena Frye; a physical confrontation ensued in which an officer struck Marquette in the face with a baton. Meanwhile, a crowd of onlookers had gathered. Rumors spread that the police had kicked a pregnant woman who was present at the scene. Six days of riots followed, motivated by allegations of police abuse. Nearly 14,000 members of the California Army National Guard helped suppress the disturbance, which resulted in 34 deaths, as well as over $40 million in property damage. It was the most notable protest of police brutality until the riots of 1992.

== Background ==
In the Great Migration of 1915–1940, major populations of African Americans moved to Northeastern and Midwestern cities such as Detroit, Chicago, St. Louis, Cincinnati, Philadelphia, Boston, and New York City to pursue jobs in newly established manufacturing industries; to cement better educational and social opportunities; and to flee racial segregation, Jim Crow laws, violence and racial bigotry in the Southern states. This wave of migration largely bypassed Los Angeles.

In the 1940s, in the Second Great Migration, black workers and families migrated to the West Coast in large numbers, in response to defense industry recruitment efforts at the start of World War II. President Franklin D. Roosevelt issued Executive Order 8802 directing defense contractors not to discriminate in hiring or promotions, opening up new opportunities for minorities. The black population in Los Angeles dramatically rose from approximately 63,700 in 1940 to about 350,000 in 1965, rising from 4% of L.A.'s population to 14%. In the Watts area, the percentage changed from an area of mixed demographics to an area which was over 80% Black.

=== Residential segregation ===
Los Angeles had racially restrictive covenants that prevented specific minorities from renting and buying property in certain areas, even long after the courts ruled such practices illegal in 1948 and the Civil Rights Act of 1964 was passed. At the beginning of the 20th century, Los Angeles was geographically divided by ethnicity, as demographics were being altered by the rapid migration from the Philippines (unincorporated territory of the U.S. at the time) and immigration from Mexico, Japan, Korea, and Southern and Eastern Europe. In the 1910s, the city was already 80% covered by racially restrictive covenants in real estate. By the 1940s, 95% of Los Angeles and Southern California housing was off-limits to certain minorities. Minorities working in L.A.'s defense industries as well as those returning after World War II faced widespread discrimination in housing. They found themselves excluded from the suburbs and restricted to housing in East or South Los Angeles, which includes the Watts neighborhood and Compton. Such real estate practices severely restricted educational and economic opportunities available to the minority community.

Following the US entry into World War II after the attack on Pearl Harbor, the federal government removed and interned 70,000 Japanese Americans from Los Angeles, leaving empty spaces in predominantly Japanese-owned areas. This further encouraged the migration of black residents into the city during the Second Great Migration to occupy the vacated spaces, such as Little Tokyo. As a result, housing in South Los Angeles became increasingly scarce, overwhelming the already established communities and providing opportunities for real estate developers. Davenport Builders, for example, was a large developer who responded to the demand, with an eye on undeveloped land in Compton. What was originally a mostly white neighborhood in the 1940s increasingly became a middle-class dream for black people, in which blue-collar laborers could enjoy suburbia away from the slums.

In the post-World War II era, suburbs in the Los Angeles area grew explosively as black residents also wanted to live in what they saw as more peaceful white neighborhoods. In a thinly veiled attempt to avoid sharing their neighborhoods with black residents, which existing white residents saw as a threat to their general peace and prosperity, most of these suburbs barred the aspiring residents, using a variety of methods. Middle-class whites in neighborhoods bordering black districts moved en masse to the suburbs, where newer housing was available. The spread of black people throughout urban Los Angeles was achieved in large part through blockbusting, a technique whereby real estate speculators would buy a home on an all-white street, sell or rent it to a black family, buy up the remaining homes from whites at cut-rate prices, then sell them to other black families at hefty profits.

The Rumford Fair Housing Act, designed to remedy residential segregation, was overturned by Proposition 14 in 1964, which was sponsored by the California real estate industry, and supported by a majority of white voters. Psychiatrist and civil rights activist Alvin Poussaint considered Proposition 14 to be one of the causes of black rebellion in Watts.

In 1950, William H. Parker was appointed and sworn in as Los Angeles chief of police. After a major scandal called Bloody Christmas of 1951, Parker pushed for more independence from political pressures that would enable him to create a more professionalized police force. The public supported him and voted for charter changes that isolated the police department from the rest of the city government.

Despite its reform and having a professionalized, military-like police force, William Parker's LAPD faced repeated criticism from the city's Latino and black residents for police brutality – resulting from his recruiting of officers from the South with strong anti-black and anti-Latino attitudes. Chief Parker coined the term "thin blue line", representing the police as holding down pervasive crime.

Resentment of such long-standing racial injustices is cited as a reason for the Watts Riots.

== Inciting incident ==
On the evening of Wednesday, August 11, 1965, 21-year-old Marquette Frye, a black man driving his mother's 1955 Buick while drunk, was pulled over by California Highway Patrol rookie motorcycle officer Lee Minikus for alleged reckless driving. After Frye failed a field sobriety test, Minikus placed him under arrest and radioed for his vehicle to be impounded. Marquette's brother Ronald, a passenger in the vehicle, walked to their house nearby, bringing their mother Rena Price back with him to the scene of the arrest.

When Rena Price reached the intersection of Avalon Boulevard and 116th Street that evening, she scolded Frye about drinking and driving as he recalled in a 1985 interview with the Orlando Sentinel. However, the situation quickly escalated: someone shoved Price, Frye was struck, Price jumped an officer, and another officer pulled out a shotgun. Backup police officers attempted to arrest Frye by using physical force to subdue him. After community members reported that police had roughed up Frye and shared a rumor they had kicked a pregnant woman, angry mobs formed. As the situation intensified, growing crowds of local residents watching the exchange began yelling and throwing objects at the police officers. Frye's mother and brother fought with the officers and eventually were arrested along with Marquette Frye.

After the arrests of Price and her sons, the crowd continued to grow along Avalon Boulevard. Police came to the scene to break up the crowd several times that night, but were attacked with rocks and chunks of concrete. A 46-square-mile (120 km^{2}) swath of Los Angeles was transformed into a combat zone during the ensuing six days.

== Riots begin ==
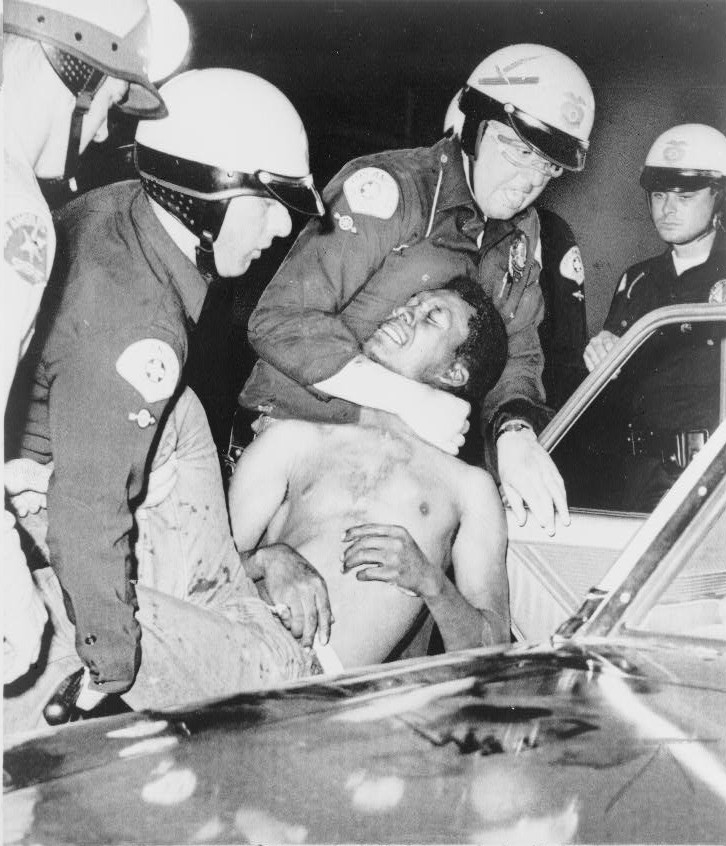
Police arrest a man during the riots on August 12

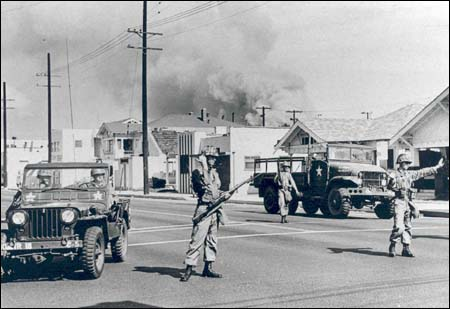
Soldiers of California's 40th Armored Division direct traffic away from an area of South Central Los Angeles burning during the Watts riot

After a night of increasing unrest, police and local black community leaders held a community meeting on Thursday, August 12, to discuss an action plan and to urge calm. The meeting failed. Later that day, Chief Parker called for the assistance of the California Army National Guard. Chief Parker believed the riots resembled an insurgency, compared it to fighting the Viet Cong, and decreed a "paramilitary" response to the disorder. Governor Pat Brown declared that law enforcement was confronting "guerrillas fighting with gangsters".

The rioting intensified, and on Friday, August 13, about 2,300 National Guardsmen joined the police in trying to maintain order on the streets. Sergeant Ben Dunn said: "The streets of Watts resembled an all-out war zone in some far-off foreign country, it bore no resemblance to the United States of America." The first riot-related death occurred on the night of August 13, when a black civilian was killed in the crossfire during a shootout between the police and rioters. Over the next few days, rioting had then spread throughout other areas, including Pasadena, Pacoima, Monrovia, Long Beach, and even as far as San Diego, although they were very minor in comparison to Watts. About 200 Guardsmen and the LAPD were sent to assist the Long Beach Police Department (LBPD) in controlling the unruly crowds.

By nightfall on Saturday, 16,000 law enforcement personnel had been mobilized and patrolled the city. Blockades were established, and warning signs were posted throughout the riot zones threatening the use of deadly force (one sign warned residents to "Turn left or get shot"). Angered over the police response, residents of Watts engaged in a full-scale battle against the first responders. Rioters tore up sidewalks and bricks to hurl at Guardsmen and police and smash their vehicles. Those actively participating in the riots started physical fights with police and blocked Los Angeles Fire Department (LAFD) firefighters from using fire hoses on protesters and burning buildings. Arson and looting were largely confined to local white-owned stores and businesses that were said to have caused resentment in the neighborhood due to low wages paid to workers and high prices.

To quell the riots, Chief Parker initiated a policy of mass arrest. Following the deployment of National Guardsmen, a curfew was declared for a vast region of South Central Los Angeles. In addition to the Guardsmen, 934 LAPD officers and 718 officers from the Los Angeles County Sheriff's Department (LASD) were deployed during the rioting. Watts and all black-majority areas in Los Angeles were put under the curfew. All residents outside of their homes in the affected areas after 8:00 p.m. were subject to arrest. Eventually, nearly 3,500 people were arrested, primarily for curfew violations. By the morning of Sunday, August 15, the riots had largely been quelled.

Over the course of six days, between 31,000 and 35,000 adults participated in the riots, or in a curfew zone sample 15%. Around 70,000 people were "sympathetic, but not active.", or 31% in a curfew zone sample. Over the six days, there were 34 deaths, 1,032 injuries, 3,438 arrests, and over $40 million in property damage. 769 buildings and businesses were damaged and looted and 208 buildings were completely destroyed. Fourteen public buildings were damaged and one was completely destroyed. Many white Americans were fearful of the breakdown of social order in Watts, especially since white motorists were being pulled over by rioters in nearby areas and assaulted. Many in the black community, however, believed the rioters were taking part in an "uprising against an oppressive system." In a 1966 essay, black civil rights activist Bayard Rustin wrote:

The whole point of the outbreak in Watts was that it marked the first major rebellion of Negroes against their own masochism and was carried on with the express purpose of asserting that they would no longer quietly submit to the deprivation of slum life.

Despite allegations that "criminal elements" were responsible for the riots, the vast majority of those arrested had no prior criminal record. Three sworn personnel were killed in the riots: a Los Angeles Fire Department firefighter was struck when a wall of a fire-weakened structure fell on him while fighting fires in a store, a Los Angeles County sheriff's deputy was accidentally shot by another deputy while in a struggle with rioters, and a Long Beach Police Department officer was shot by another police officer during a scuffle with rioters. 23 out of the 34 people killed in the riots were shot by LAPD officers or National Guardsmen.

== Public debate over causes of riots ==
Debate rose quickly over what had taken place in Watts, as the area was known to be under a great deal of racial and social tension. Reactions and reasoning about the riots greatly varied based on the perspectives of those affected by and participating in the riots.

National civil rights leader Rev. Dr. Martin Luther King Jr. spoke two days after the riots. He believed the riots were partly a response to Proposition 14, a constitutional amendment sponsored by the California Real Estate Association and passed that had in effect repealed the Rumford Fair Housing Act. In 1966, the California Supreme Court reinstated the Rumford Fair Housing Act in the Reitman v. Mulkey case (a decision affirmed by the U.S. Supreme Court the following year), declaring the amendment unconstitutional.

A variety of opinions and explanations were published. Public opinion polls taken in the years after the riots showed that a majority believed the riots were linked to communist groups who were active in the area protesting high unemployment rates and racial discrimination. Those opinions concerning racism and discrimination were expressed three years after hearings conducted by a committee of the U.S. Commission on Civil Rights took place in Los Angeles to assess the condition of relations between the police force and minorities. These hearings were also intended to make a ruling on the discrimination case against the police for their alleged mistreatment of members of the Nation of Islam. These different arguments and opinions are often cited in continuing debates over the underlying causes of the Watts riots.

=== McCone Commission ===
Governor Pat Brown set up an investigation into the riots, the McCone Commission, led by former C.I.A. director John A. McCone. Other committee members included Warren Christopher, a Los Angeles attorney who would be the committee's vice chairman, Earl C. Broady, Los Angeles Superior Court judge; Asa V. Call, former president of the state chamber of commerce; Rev. Charles Casassa, president of Loyola University of Los Angeles; the Rev. James E. Jones of Westminster Presbyterian Church and member of the Los Angeles Board of Education; Mrs. Robert G. Newmann, a League of Women Voters leader; and Dr. Sherman M. Mellinkoff, dean of the School of Medicine at UCLA. The only two black members were Jones and Broady.

The commission released a 101-page report on December 2, 1965, entitled Violence in the City – An End or a Beginning?: A Report by the Governor's Commission on the Los Angeles Riots, 1965.

The McCone Commission identified the root causes of the riots to be high unemployment, poor schools and related inferior living conditions endured by black residents in Watts. Recommendations for addressing these problems included "emergency literacy and preschool programs, improved police-community ties, increased low-income housing, more job-training projects, upgraded health-care services, more efficient public transportation, and many more." Most of these recommendations were never implemented.

== Aftermath ==
=== Martin Luther King Jr. and Lyndon Johnson assessment of situation ===
In a taped White phone conversation on August 20, 1965, Martin Luther King Jr. called U.S. President Lyndon Johnson to discuss the outcome of his meetings with LAPD chief William Parker and mayor Sam Yorty. King described Parker as a "very rude man," while also not seeing "a willingness on the part of the mayor to grant just a few concessions to make-to bring about a new sense of hope...," but also noted that the people of Watts area were in fear of a return by the "National Guard." King noted how he was fearful of "retaliation in the white community" should the local National Guard return, noting how already "people have brought up guns, and Chief Parker went on television the other day. They need to do anti-riot crew and all that." King recommended that fighting poverty was a solution in order to prevent a "race war," with President Johnson accepting King's recommendation to have Lee C. White come to the White House. Johnson also noted to King that despite publicly advocating for people to obey the law, he also believed that "there's no use giving lectures on the law as long as you got rats eating on people's kid - children and unemployed, and no roof over their head, and no job to go to, and may with a dope needle on one side a cancer on the other."

=== White flight ===
After the Watts Riots, white families left surrounding nearby suburbs like Compton, Huntington Park, and South Gate in large numbers. Although the unrest did not reach these suburbs during the riots, many white residents still felt the need to leave the area.

Due to widespread destruction of residential properties from the Watts Riots, black families began to relocate in other cities that had established black neighborhoods. One of these was the city of Pomona. The arrival of so many black families to Pomona caused white flight to take place there and saw many of those white families move to neighboring cities in the Pomona Valley.

=== LAPD ===
After the riots, the LAPD examined the process of how each incident was managed by law enforcement, noting the flaws of its system when handling situations of hostile crowds or groups.

=== People involved in the sparking incident ===
Marquette Frye was convicted of drunk driving, battery, and malicious mischief. On February 18, 1966, he received a sentence of 90 days in the county jail and three years probation. He received another 90-day jail term after a jury convicted him of battery and disturbing the peace on May 18, 1966. Over the 10-year period following the riots, he was arrested 34 times. He died of pneumonia on December 20, 1986, at age 42. His mother, Rena Price, died on June 10, 2013, at age 97. She never recovered the impounded 1955 Buick which her son had been driving because the storage fees exceeded the car's value. Motorcycle officer Lee Minikus died on October 19, 2013, at age 79.

== Cultural references ==
- The 1972 music festival at the Los Angeles Coliseum known as Wattstax, and its follow-up 1973 documentary film, were created to commemorate the seventh anniversary of the riots.
- The Hughes brothers film Menace II Society (1993) opens with images taken from the riots of 1965. The entire film is set in Watts from the 1970s to the 1990s.
- Frank Zappa wrote a lyrical commentary inspired by the Watts riots, entitled "Trouble Every Day". It contains such lines as "Wednesday I watched the riot / Seen the cops out on the street / Watched 'em throwin' rocks and stuff /And chokin' in the heat". The song was released on his debut album Freak Out! (with the original Mothers of Invention), and later slightly rewritten as "More Trouble Every Day", available on Roxy and Elsewhere and The Best Band You Never Heard In Your Life.
- Phil Ochs's 1965 song "In the Heat of the Summer", most famously recorded by Judy Collins, was a chronicle of the Watts Riots.
- Sanford and Son: The Watts Riots are mentioned in several episodes.
- Gil Scott-Heron's song "The Revolution Will Not Be Televised" directly references the Watts riots.
- Curt Gentry's 1968 novel, The Last Days of the Late, Great State of California, dissected the riots in detail in a fact-based semi-documentary tone.
- Joan Didion's 1968 essay, "The Santa Anas", makes reference to the riots as resulting from the Santa Ana Foehn winds.
- Charles Bukowski mentioned the Watts riots in his poem "Who in the hell is Tom Jones?" and briefly mentions the events towards the end of Post Office.
- Joseph Wambaugh's novel The New Centurions (1971), and the 1972 movie adaptation of the same name, are partially set during the Watts riots.
- Paul McCartney's 1983 song "Pipes of Peace", in the chorus "...Songs of joy instead of "burn, baby, burn" (Burn, baby, burn)...". “Burn, baby, burn!” was the rallying call for the Watts riots.
- The 1990 film Heat Wave depicts the Watts riots from the perspective of journalist Bob Richardson as a resident of Watts and a reporter for the Los Angeles Times.
- The 1994 film There Goes My Baby tells the story of a group of high school seniors living in L.A. during the riots.
- The producers of the Planet of the Apes franchise stated that the riots inspired the ape uprising featured in the film Conquest of the Planet of the Apes.
- In "Black on White on Fire", an episode of the television series Quantum Leap which aired November 9, 1990, Sam Beckett shifts into the body of a black medical student who is engaged to a white woman while living in Watts during the riots.
- Scenes in "Burn, Baby, Burn, Baby, Burn, Burn, Bird", an episode of the TV series Dark Skies, are set in Los Angeles during the riots.
- The movie C.S.A.: The Confederate States of America mentions the Watts riots as a slave rebellion rather than a riot.
- Walter Mosley's novel Little Scarlet, in which Mosley's lead character Easy Rawlins is asked by police to investigate a racially charged murder in neighborhoods where white investigators are unwelcome, takes place in the aftermath of the Watts riots.
- The riots are depicted in the third issue of the Before Watchmen: Comedian comic book.
- The riots are referred to in the 2000 film Remember the Titans. An Alexandria, Virginia school board representative tells head football coach Bill Yoast that he would be replaced by Herman Boone, a black coach from North Carolina because the school board feared that otherwise, Alexandria would "...burn up like Watts".
- In Chapter 9 of A Song Flung Up To Heaven, the sixth volume of Maya Angelou's autobiography, Angelou gives an account of the riots. She had a job in the neighborhood at the time and was there as they played out.
- The arrest of the Frye brothers and the riots are referred to by the character George Hutchence in the second volume of the comics miniseries Jupiter's Circle, as an example of class struggle.
- The riots are mentioned in the first episode of O.J.: Made in America.
- The riots are mentioned in Richard Powers' novel The Time of Our Singing (2003).
- The riots are mentioned in Michael Connelly's lost chapter of his 1999 novel Angels Flight, as well as his 2005 novel The Closers.
- In comedian Christopher Titus' 2009 comedy special "Love is Evol", Titus mentions that his father, Ken Titus, was a California National Guardsman during the Watts Riots and defended liquor stores from rock-throwing rioters.
- The titular song from American hip hop group Cypress Hill's 2010 album Rise Up opens up with the line "Not since the Watts Riot of 1965, has the city seem so out of control. Los Angeles is still on edge".
- The riots are occurring in episodes five and six of the TV show I Am the Night.
- The riots are mentioned in the 2020 novel The Vanishing Half by Brit Bennett.

== See also ==
- Bibliography of Los Angeles
- Outline of the history of Los Angeles
- Bibliography of California history
- Cloward–Piven strategy, derived from the riots in the 1960s
- History of African-Americans in Los Angeles
- Billy G. Mills (born 1929), Los Angeles City Councilman, 1963–74, investigated the Watts riots
- Charles A. Ott Jr. (1920–2006), United States Army and California Army National Guard Major General who commanded National Guard soldiers in Los Angeles during the event
- Watts Prophets
- Wattstax
- Zoot Suit Riots
