= Muzafer Sherif =

Turkish-American psychologist (1906–1988)

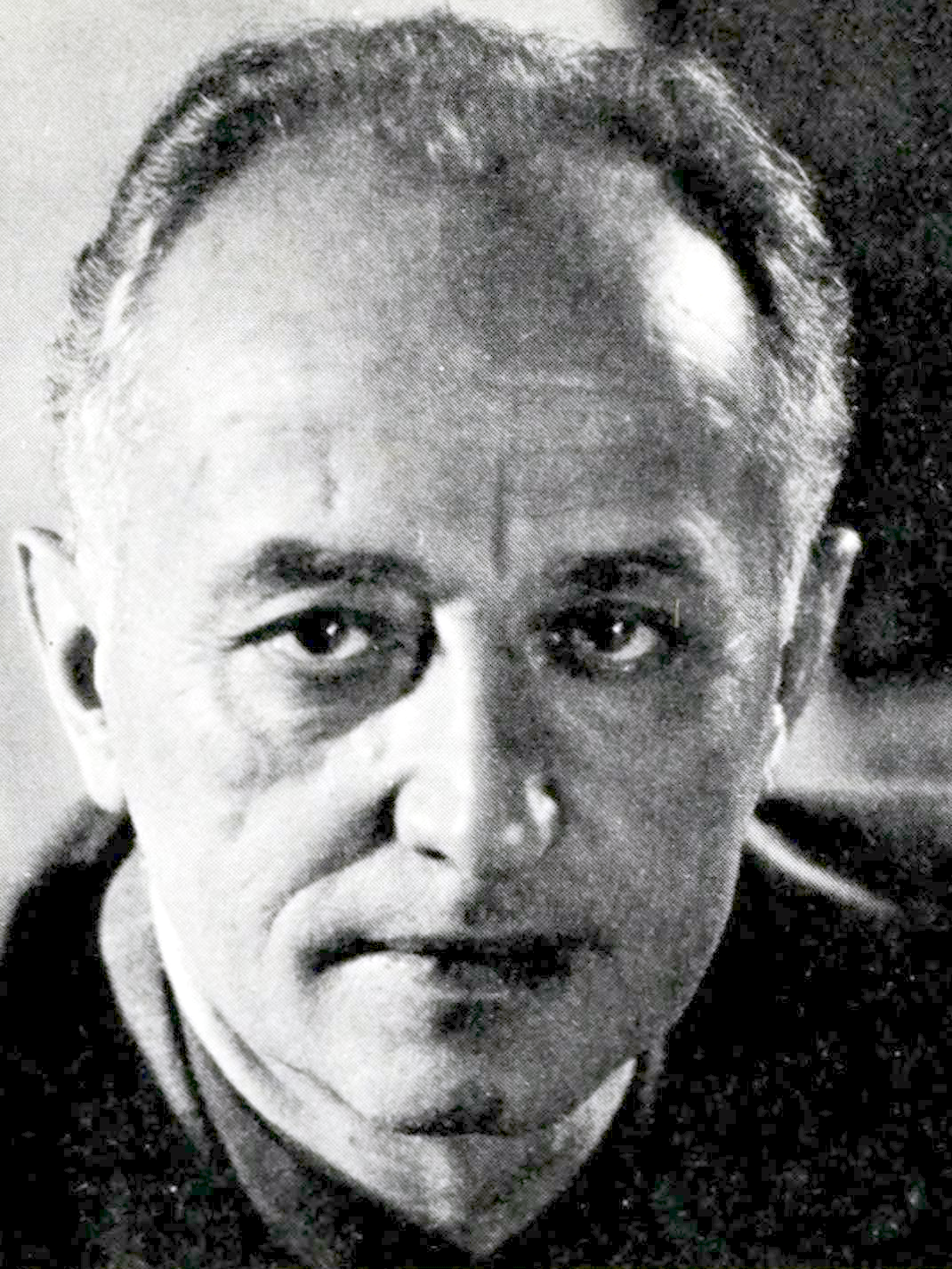
- Sherif c. 1967
- Born: July 29, 1906; Ödemiş, Ottoman Empire
- Died: October 16, 1988 (aged 82); Fairbanks, Alaska, U.S.
- Known for: Social psychology (group conformity, Robbers cave study)
- Spouse: Carolyn Wood (m. 1945)
- Children: 3
- Awards: Guggenheim Foundation Fellowship (1967); Kurt Lewin Memorial Award (1967)

Academic background
- Education: Istanbul University; Harvard University; Columbia University
- Thesis: A study of some social factors in perception (1935)

Academic work
- Discipline: Psychology
- Sub-discipline: Social psychology
- Institutions: Gazi University; Ankara University DTCF; Princeton University; Yale University; University of Oklahoma; Pennsylvania State University

Muzafer Sherif (born Muzaffer Şerif Başoğlu; July 29, 1906 – October 16, 1988) was a Turkish-American social psychologist. He helped develop social judgment theory and realistic conflict theory.

Sherif was a founder of modern social psychology who developed several unique and powerful techniques for understanding social processes, particularly social norms and social conflict. Many of his original contributions to social psychology have been absorbed into the field so fully that his role in the development and discovery has disappeared. Other reformulations of social psychology have taken his contributions for granted, and re-presented his ideas as new.

== Life and career ==
=== Early life, education and political involvement ===
Muzafer Sherif was born as Muzaffer Şerif Başoğlu and grew up in a wealthy family that included five children, of whom he was the second born. He attended Elementary School in Ödemiş for six years and then attended Izmir International College from which he received a Bachelor of Arts in 1926. Sherif then obtained MA degree from the Istanbul University in 1928, where he also expressed his support for the modernization of Turkey during political debates and gathered interest in goal-oriented behaviour, or hormic psychology as proposed by British psychologist William McDougall.

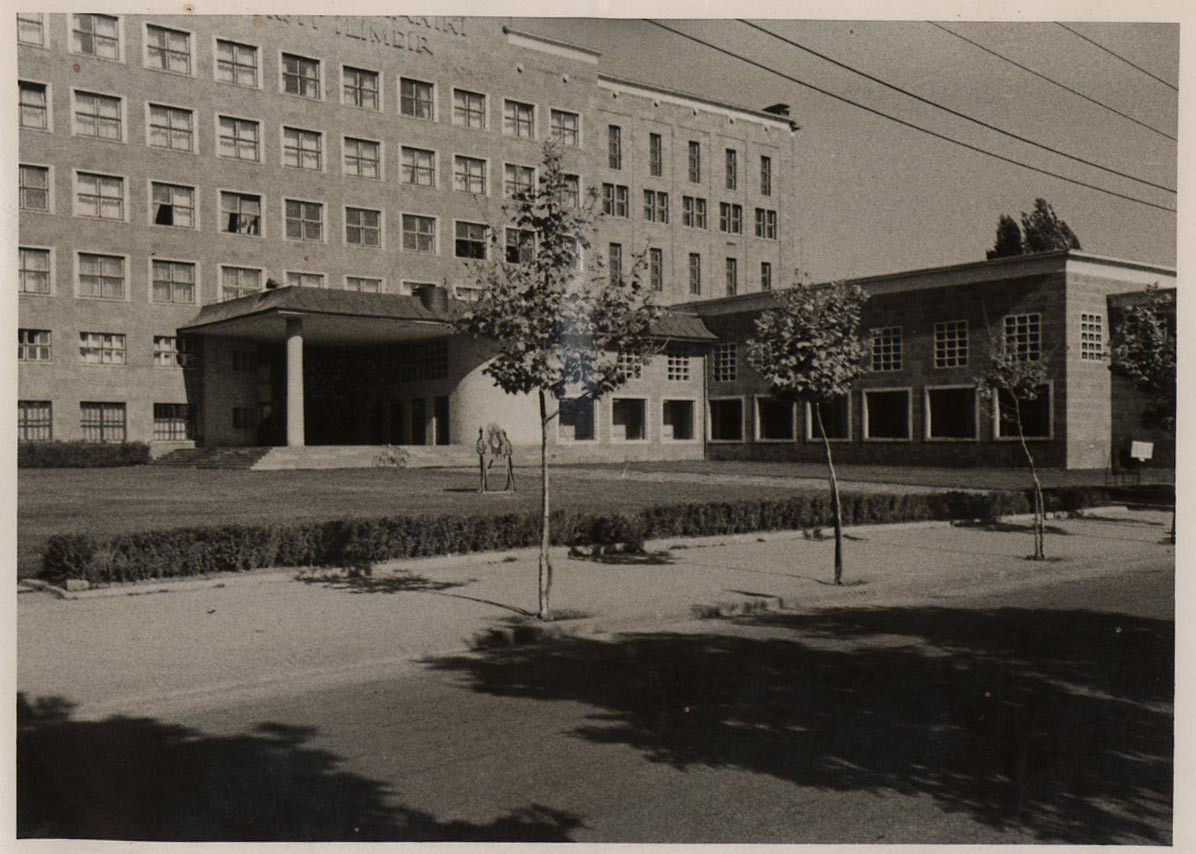
A picture of Ankara University in 1937, where Sherif published Irk Psikolojisi (1943) and The Changing World (1945)

Sherif grew up through the Italo-Turkish War, the Balkan Wars, World War I. Additionally, Izmir underwent occupation by Greek and Turkish soldiers from 1918 to 1924 in the Turkish War of Independence while he attended the college.

Sherif went to America during the peak of the Great Depression, earning an MA from Harvard University where his teachers were Gordon Allport and Caroll Pratt. He visited Berlin in 1932 during the rise of the Nazi Party to attend Wolfgang Köhler's lectures on Gestalt Psychology, whereafter Sherif planned to use Gestalt principles for a new social perception theory.

He returned to the U.S. in 1933 and re-enrolled at Harvard for his Doctoral studies, but later switched to Columbia University, where he earned a Ph.D. in 1935 under Gardner Murphy. Sherif gained a position at Ankara University upon his return to Turkey and developed ties with the Communist Party of Turkey (TKP). He criticized members of the bureaucracy and Nazi-supporters in his works as fascism became more prevalent. He was briefly detained along with other members of the TKP in 1944 following political conflicts at Ankara University, where he sided with Communists. Sherif went back to the U.S. permanently in 1945.

=== Early career and marriage ===
In 1945, Sherif married Carolyn Wood, and they collaborated productively on subsequent projects for many years, on scholarly books (e.g., Sherif & Sherif, 1953) and a textbook (Sherif & Sherif, 1969). They had three daughters: Ann, Sue and Joan.

In 1947, he published his first book, The Psychology of Ego Involvements, co-written with Hadley Cantril. In it, he compared Soviet and American societies, by showing different values and beliefs of the nations which flowed from different social and cultural contexts. With it, he posited that individualistic, competitive and conflictual society is avoidable.

=== Life in the US ===
Sherif fled back to America shortly after his detainment in Turkey in 1945 due to fear of a harsher and longer punishment for his association with the Communist Party. The social academic environment during Sherif's first years in America supported Sherif's Marxist views and inspired The Psychology of Ego Involvements (1947), published from Princeton University.

By 1951 Sherif's relationship with Turkey had been completely damaged. He'd lost all contact with close friends and colleagues during Turkey's anti-Communist shutdown and his relationships with family dwindled.

Despite Sherif's influence in the Social Psychology academic scene, he remained stateless. Sherif no longer held rights in Turkey and was not granted US citizenship. Sherif was listed on the Federal Bureau of Investigation's Communist sympathizer list and was interrogated by the FBI, which caused him to be more discreet about his socio-political views.

Sherif was officially fired as a professor at Ankara University, and was legally liable for salary debt to the Turkish government during his residence in the U.S. Sherif's marriage to his American wife, Carolyn Wood, led to his dismissal because it violated policies banning the marriage of Turks to foreigners.

Although mostly recognized as a psychologist, Sherif was the first to obtain the Cooley-Mead Award for Contributions to Social Psychology from the American Sociological Association. His academic appointments included Yale University, the University of Oklahoma, and Pennsylvania State University.

=== Mental illness and late life ===
Sherif had difficulties with mental illness as he was diagnosed with manic depression and had attempted suicide. Sherif's mental health worsened after his wife's death in 1982. According to his daughter, Sue, with whom Sherif was living at that time, Sherif was in good spirits when he was stricken with a fatal heart attack. He died on October 16, 1988, in Fairbanks, Alaska, at the age of 82.

== Contributions to psychology ==
Sherif made contributions to social psychological theory, field and laboratory methodology, and to the application of research to social issues. He wrote more than 60 articles and 24 books. The majority of his research was done with his wife, Carolyn Wood Sherif.

=== Autokinetic effect experiments ===
Sherif's dissertation was titled "Some Social Factors In Perception", and the ideas and research were the basis for his first classic book, The Psychology of Social Norms.

The topic of the dissertation was social influence in perception, and the experiments have come to be known as the "autokinetic effect" experiments. Sherif's experimental study of autokinetic movement demonstrated how mental evaluation norms were created by human beings. In an otherwise totally dark room, a small dot of light is shown on a wall, and after a few moments, the dot seemingly appears to move. This apparent motion is an illusion, resulting from the complete lack of a "frame of reference" for the movement. Three participants enter the dark room, and watch the light. It appears to move, and the participants are asked to estimate how far the dot of light moves. These estimates are made out loud, and with repeated trials, each group of three converges on an estimate. Some groups converged on a high estimate, some low, and some in-between. The critical finding is that groups found their own level, their own "social norm" of perception. This occurred naturally, without discussion or prompting.

When invited back individually a week later and tested alone in the dark room, participants replicated their original groups' estimates. This suggests that the influence of the group was informational rather than coercive; because they continued to perceive individually what they had as members of a group, Sherif concluded that they had internalized their original group's way of seeing the world. Because the phenomenon of the autokinetic effect is entirely a product of a person's own perceptual system, this study is evidence of how the social world pierces the person's skin, and affects the way they understand their own physical and psychological sensations.

=== Realistic conflict theory and the Robbers Cave experiment ===
In 1961, Sherif and Carolyn Wood Sherif developed realistic conflict theory, which has been described as "account[ing] for inter group conflict, negative prejudices, and stereotypes as a result of actual competition between groups for desired resources." This theory was based in part on the 1954 Robber's Cave experiment. The 1954 experiment, and an abandoned 1953 experiment have come under recent scrutiny, with particular interest in the manipulation and provocation of the child participants by the scientists, and possible confirmation bias by Sherif.

In the 1954 experiment, "22 white, fifth grade, 11 year old boys with average-to-good school performance and above average intelligence with a protestant, two parent background were sent to a special remote summer camp in Oklahoma, Robbers Cave State Park." The failed 1953 experiment took place in Middle Grove, New York with the same criteria in place for choosing participants. The participants were carefully screened to be psychologically normal, and they did not know each other. Sending them to such a remote location was done to reduce the influence of external factors and better allow "the true nature of conflict and prejudice" to be studied.

Researchers, who doubled as counsellors at this summer camp, divided the participants into two different groups, and each group were assigned cabins far from the other. During the first phase, groups did not know the existence of the others. "The boys developed an attachment to their groups throughout the first week of the camp by doing various activities together: hiking, swimming, etc. The boys chose names for their groups, The Eagles and The Rattlers, and stenciled them onto shirts and flags". In this "ingroup formation" phase, members of the groups got to know each other, social norms developed and leadership and structure emerged.

Then the second, group conflict or "friction" phase began, in which the groups came into contact with each other. Researchers set up a four-day competitions between those groups with promised prizes to the winners. Prejudice became apparent between the two groups. The prejudice was initially only verbally expressed, such as through taunting or name calling, but as the competition progressed, the prejudice began being expressed more directly, such as with one group burning the other's flag or ransacking their cabin. The groups became too aggressive with each other to control; the researchers had to separate them physically.

Researchers then gave all boys a two-day cooling-off period, and asked them to list characteristics of the two groups. The boys tended to characterize their own group highly favourably and the other group very negatively. The researchers then attempted to reduce the prejudice between the groups, and found that simply increasing their contact with each other made matters worse. In contrast, "Forcing the groups to work together to reach superordinate goals, or common goals, eased the prejudice and tension among the groups". Thus, in this "integration" or conflict resolution phase, it was shown that superordinate goals reduce conflict significantly more effectively than communication or contact did.

=== Crisis in social psychology ===
In 1977, Sherif published a paper identifying problem areas in Social Psychology as well as solutions towards them.

Publication Quality vs Volume

Sherif begins by describing that social psychology (at the time of publication) was undergoing an increase in the amount of research taking place, and publications printed. To state his position he claims that the ratio of chaff (dry, unusable, straw material used to symbolize meaningless research) to wheat (meaningful and useful research) is off. He believes this is recognized by other social psychologists high in the field such as Harry Triandis, and acknowledges that some may disagree with his opinion.

Thriving Research: Small Group Research and Attitude Change Research

Sherif references Paul Hare and Fred Strodtbeck's bibliographic compilation of all small group research studies from the July 1954 issue of Sociometry in which 584 citations were listed. This is compared with the March 1972 issue which listed 2021 items.

Despite this vast increase, Sherif believes that the studies don't build off of each other so it is hard to argue from common ground when variables, tasks, and measures are not consistent. He also mentions how social psychology has become more individualistic, focusing on internal states like "dissonance, attitudes, [and] attributions", rather than properties of a group.

Sherif blames reductionism, where the phenomena of groups was reduced to interpersonal reaction and ahistoricalism which removed situational factors from consideration. To remedy this he cites Albert Pepitone's stance that social psychology should focus on research normative in substance (address sociocultural perspectives) and comparative methods.

Sherif promotes the idea of attitude and attitude change due to its importance in a quickly changing world. He emphasizes that real world contexts are important, even if regarded as "messy" compared to controlled lab experiments.

Increasing Pressure of the Crisis

Sherif believes this "publish or perish" culture perpetuates a large output of studies that aren't necessarily high quality, as researchers are forced to publish papers for their careers, rather than for good science. This leads to a loss of direction for the field as rather than working together on a shared paradigm, researchers are in "self-contained castles" within psychology, but also across disciplines in the social sciences. Clyde Hendrick, asked his colleagues about the "crisis" in the social psychology field and had researchers provide arguments on the following topics: - Scientific vs Historical - Environmental vs Social Psychologies - Field vs Experimental research - Grand theory vs Smaller operational theories vs belief that the field is doing well Following Psychologists participated: Y. Epstein, D. Stokols, H. Pronshansky, I. Altman, M. Mania, K. Gergen, B. Schlenker, A. Greenwald, C. Hendrick, W. Thorngate, R. Harris, P. Secord, M. B. Smith, D. Forsyth, S. Baumgardner, B. Earn, and R. Kroger (Fall, 1976)

Sherif mentions that the crisis reproduces itself such that researchers who are in their "self-contained castles" write Social Psychology textbooks, but exclude positions which disagree with their own rather than educate students of a shared paradigm (such paradigms don't exist, Sherif argues). This is likely as Akan Elm's states that Social Psychology is still in its "pre-paradigmatic stage of development" and any sort of yield should be celebrated. To this Sherif asks why the field isn't closer in the 70s than in the 50s, despite roughly 3000 publications being produced since the 50s.

Sherif endorses the communication across discipline where it isn't scientific vs historical to understand a problem, but scientific AND historical. This will help to create commonly shared paradigms, to remove those from their "castles" and disband "disorderly faction-infested tribes" for the greater good of science.

Breaking Through the Crisis

Sherif explains that some theory model-builders become fixated and create models of small trivial problems, and to break through the crisis is to ask some "unthinkable" questions. What is the nature of a social system in terms of its structure, and function. Sherif claims that psychologists may avoid this, as this is a social rather than psychological question. But ignoring the social aspects of a system is like avoiding the physics of light while studying vision.

If Psychology wants to join the ranks of physical sciences, it has to be acknowledged that they asked their "unthinkable" questions during their establishment. They tested their phenomena through simulation models and studies, by viewing physical phenomena in the real world, psychologists need to do the same according to Sherif rather than standing at a far distance.

The importance of cross-cultural comparisons is also mentioned by Sherif to insure the validity of methods.

== Contributions to sociology ==
The social judgement theory examines how the assessment and perception of one's ideas are consistent with current attitudes. As new ideas are present, it is assessed by contrasting with one's current beliefs. Muzafer Sherif examined how one has their own latitudes of perception of their ideas and that may be opposing to others' point of view. As a result, he illustrated three forms of latitude which are the latitude of acceptance, rejection and non-commitment. The latitude of acceptance explores the variety of ideas that individuals perceive as considerable and acceptable. The latitude of rejection explores the variety of ideas that an individual perceives to be disagreeable and not deemed considerable. The latitude of noncommitment explores the ideas that are neither considerable or disagreeable. Furthermore, ego involvement is significant in the theory of social judgement as individuals who do not provide an importance to an issue, determine that they consist of broad latitude of noncommitment. As a result, the latitude of rejection of ideas and opposing ideas result in involvement of high ego. Moreover, Sherif explored contrast and assimilation in people's latitudes. Contrast latitude explains how individuals perceive perspectives and beliefs within the latitude of rejection than it actually should be considered and assimilation explains how individuals perceive perspectives and beliefs within their latitude of acceptance than it actually should be. The boomerang effect explored how one's beliefs and attitudes change directions in opposing way to what the message is conveying. Therefore, people are distant from the message of the idea instead of being conveyed to the message.

== Books and editorial work ==
During his career, Sherif authored and coauthored 24 books and over 60 journal articles and chapters which are still influential in the field of psychology.

=== 1937–1944 ===
He established a small laboratory at Ankara University. The laboratory was on the social judgment from where he, along with his students translated many works in psychology into the Turkish language. The translation included but was not limited to 1937 Stanford-Binet, chapters from E. G. Boring's History of Experimental Psychology as well as Robert S. Woodworth's Contemporary Schools of Psychology.

=== 1945–1947 ===
Upon returning to the United States in January 1945, he joined Princeton University as a Fellow of the U.S. State Department. Here he collaborated with Hadley Cantril on The Psychology of Ego-Involvements, which was later published in 1947.

=== 1947–1949 ===
Sherif was a Rockefeller Research Fellow at Yale University from 1947 to 1949. His long and prolific collaboration with Carl Hovland began from here, which led to many influential papers on the anchoring effects of attitudes as well as the book, Social Judgement: Assimilation and Contrast Effects in Communication and Attitude Change which was published in 1961.

=== 1949–1966 ===
He moved to Oklahoma in 1949, where he worked as a professor, research professor, and director of the Institute of Group Relations, which he founded in 1952. This was the peak of his scholarly activity that resulted in 12 books and 43 research articles and chapters on various topics like attitudes, properties of natural and experimentally created groups on perception, anchoring effects of psychophysical scales, judgment, and self-functioning, etc.

Sherif organized different seminars at Oklahoma and later wrote five books based on the papers delivered at those seminars. Some of the well-known volumes included Group in Harmony and Tension (with his wife Carolyn Sherif), Social Judgment (with Carl Hovland), Reference Groups: An Exploration Into Conformity and Deviation of Adolescents (with Carolyn Sherif), Attitude and Attitude Change: The Social Judgment-Involvement Approach (with Carolyn Sherif and R. Nebergall), In Common Predicament: Social Psychology of Inter-group Conflict and Cooperation, and a major revision of a textbook, An Outline of Social Psychology (with Carolyn Sherif).

Although he wrote many texts and research in psychology, his best-known work during his 16 years stay at Oklahoma is the Inter-group Conflict and Cooperation: The Robber's Cave Experiment (with O. J. Harvey, B. J. White, W. R. Hood, and C. W. Sherif). This was initially distributed as a technical report in 1954 but was reprinted without the copyrights of the University Oklahoma Bookstore in 1961. In 1988, it was published by Wesleyan University Press for the first time.

In 1966 he and his wife moved to Pennsylvania State University, where she became a member of the Psychology Department and he became a Sociology Professor. During this time, he authored, co-authored and co-edited several journal articles and five books with his wife, Carolyn. These five books were: Group Conflict and Cooperation; Attitude, Ego-Involvement and Change; Social Interaction, Process, and Products: Selected Essays of Muzafer Sherif; and Social Psychology, a revision of the 1966 edition of that textbook.
