= Realistic conflict theory =

Social psychological model of intergroup conflict

Realistic conflict theory (RCT), also known as realistic group conflict theory (RGCT), is a social psychological model of intergroup conflict. The theory explains how intergroup hostility can arise as a result of conflicting goals and competition over limited resources, and it also offers an explanation for the feelings of prejudice and discrimination toward the outgroup that accompany the intergroup hostility. Groups may be in competition for a real or perceived scarcity of resources such as money, political power, military protection, or social status.

Feelings of resentment can arise in the situation that the groups see the competition over resources as having a zero-sums fate, in which only one group is the winner (obtained the needed or wanted resources) and the other loses (unable to obtain the limited resource due to the "winning" group achieving the limited resource first). The length and severity of the conflict is based upon the perceived value and shortage of the given resource. According to RCT, positive relations can only be restored if superordinate goals are in place.

== Concept ==
=== History ===
The theory was officially named by Donald Campbell, but has been articulated by others since the middle of the 20th century. In the 1960s, this theory developed from Campbell's recognition of social psychologists' tendency to reduce all human behavior to hedonistic goals. He criticized psychologists like John Thibaut, Harold Kelley, and George Homans, who emphasized theories that place food, sex, and pain avoidance as central to all human processes. According to Campbell, hedonistic assumptions do not adequately explain intergroup relations. Campbell believed that these social exchange theorists oversimplified human behavior by likening interpersonal interaction to animal behavior. Similar to the ideas of Campbell, other researchers also began recognizing a problem in the psychological understanding of intergroup behavior. These researchers noted that prior to Campbell, social exchange theorists ignored the essence of social psychology and the importance of interchanges between groups. To the contrary of prior theories, RCT takes into account the sources of conflict between groups, which include incompatible goals and competition over limited resources.

=== Robbers Cave study ===
The 1954 Robbers Cave experiment (or Robbers Cave study) by Muzafer Sherif and Carolyn Wood Sherif represents one of the most widely known demonstrations of RCT. The Sherifs' study was conducted over three weeks in a 200-acre summer camp in Robbers Cave State Park, Oklahoma, focusing on intergroup behavior. In this study, researchers posed as camp personnel, observing 22 eleven- and twelve-year-old boys who had never previously met and had comparable backgrounds (each subject was a white eleven to twelve-year-old boy of average to slightly above average intelligence from a Protestant, middle-class, two-parent home).

The experiments were conducted within the framework of regular camp activities and games. The experiment was divided into three stages. The first stage being "in-group formation", in which upon arrival the boys were housed together in one large bunkhouse. The boys quickly formed particular friendships. After a few days the boys were split randomly into two approximately equal groups. Each group was unaware of the other group's presence. The second stage was the "friction phase", wherein the groups were entered into competition with one another in various camp games. Valued prizes were awarded to the winners. This caused both groups to develop negative attitudes and behaviors towards the outgroup. At this stage 93% of the boys' friendship was within their in-group. The third and final stage was the "integration stage". During this stage, tensions between the groups were reduced through teamwork-driven tasks that required intergroup cooperation.

The Sherifs made several conclusions based on the three-stage Robbers Cave experiment. From the study, they determined that because the groups were created to be approximately equal, individual differences are not necessary or responsible for intergroup conflict to occur. As seen in the study when the boys were competing in camp games for valued prizes, the Sherifs noted that hostile and aggressive attitudes toward an outgroup arise when groups compete for resources that only one group can attain. The Sherifs also established that contact with an outgroup is insufficient, by itself, to reduce negative attitudes. Finally, they concluded that friction between groups can be reduced and positive intergroup relations can be maintained, only in the presence of superordinate goals that promote united, cooperative action.

However, a further review of the Robbers Cave experiments, which were in fact a series of three separate experiments carried out by the Sherifs and colleagues, reveals additional deliberations. In two earlier studies, the boys ganged up on a common enemy and, in fact, on occasion ganged up on the experimenters themselves, showing an awareness of being manipulated. In addition, Michael Billig argues that the experimenters themselves constitute a third group, and one that is arguably the most powerful of the three, and that they in fact become the outgroup in the aforementioned experiment.

Lutfy Diab repeated the experiment with 18 boys from Beirut. The 'Blue Ghost' and 'Red Genies' groups each contained 5 Christians and 4 Muslims. Fighting soon broke out, not between the Christians and Muslims but between the Red and Blue groups.

== Extensions and applications ==
=== Implications for diversity and integration ===
RCT offers an explanation for negative attitudes toward racial integration and efforts to promote diversity. This is illustrated in the data collected from the Michigan National Election Studies survey. According to the survey, most whites held negative attitudes toward school districts' attempts to integrate schools via school busing in the 1970s. In these surveys, there was a general perceived threat that whites had of African Americans. It can be concluded that, contempt towards racial integration was due to a perception of blacks as a danger to valued lifestyles, goals, and resources, rather than symbolic racism or prejudice attitudes formulated during childhood.

RCT can also provide an explanation for why competition over limited resources in communities can present potentially harmful consequences in establishing successful organizational diversity. In the workplace, this is depicted by the concept that increased racial heterogeneity among employees is associated with job dissatisfaction among majority members. Since organizations are affixed in the communities to which their employees belong, the racial makeup of employees' communities affect attitudes toward diversity in the workplace. As racial heterogeneity increases in a white community, white employees are less accepting of workplace diversity. RCT provides an explanation of this pattern because in communities of mixed races, members of minority groups are seen as competing for economic security, power, and prestige with the majority group.

RCT can help explain discrimination against different ethnic and racial groups. An example of this is shown in cross-cultural studies that determined that violence between different groups escalates in relationship to shortages in resources. When a group has a notion that resources are limited and only available for possession by one group, this leads to attempts to remove the source of competition. Groups can attempt to remove their competition by increasing their group's capabilities (e.g., skill training), decreasing the abilities of the outgroup's competition (e.g., expressing negative attitudes or applying punitive tariffs), or by decreasing proximity to the outgroup (e.g., denying immigrant access).

=== An extension to unequal groups ===
Realistic conflict theory originally only described the results of competition between two groups of equal status. John Duckitt suggests that the theory be expanded to include competition between groups of unequal status. To demonstrate this, Duckitt created a scheme of types of realistic conflict with groups of unequal status and their resulting correlation with prejudice.

Duckitt concluded that there are at least two types of conflict based on ingroups competition with an outgroup. The first is "competition with an equal group", explained by realistic conflict theory. Thus being, group-based threat that leads ingroup members to feel hostile towards the outgroup which can lead to conflict as the ingroup focuses on acquiring the threatened resource. The second type of conflict is "domination of the outgroup by the ingroup". This occurs when the ingroup and outgroup do not have equal status. If domination occurs, there are two responses the subordinate group may have. One is stable oppression, in which the subordinate group accepts the dominating group's attitudes on some focal issue and sometimes, the dominant group's deeper values to avoid further conflict. The second response that may occur is unstable oppression. This occurs when the subordinate group rejects the lower status forced upon them, and sees the dominating group as oppressive. The dominant group then may view the subordinates' challenge as either justified or unjustified. If it is seen as unjustified, the dominant group will likely respond to the subordinates' rebellion with hostility. If the subordinates' rebellion is viewed as justified, the subordinates are given the power to demand change. An example of this would be the eventual recognition of the civil rights movement in the 1960s in the United States.

=== An extension to nations ===
When group conflict extends to nations or tribes, Regality Theory argues that the collective danger leads citizens to start having strong feelings of national or tribal identity, preferring strong, hierarchical political system, adopting strict discipline and punishment of deviants, and expressing xenophobia and strict religious and sexual morality.

== See also ==
- Amity-enmity complex
- Discrimination
- Group conflict
- Group threat theory
- Intergroup relations
- Minimal group paradigm
- Prejudice
- Social psychology
- Stereotypes
