= Group conflict =

Hostilities between different groups

Group conflict, or hostilities between different groups, is a feature common to all forms of human social organization (e.g., sports teams, ethnic groups, nations, religions, gangs), and also occurs in social animals. Although group conflict is one of the most complex phenomena studied by social scientists, the history of the human race evidences a series of group-level conflicts that have gained notoriety over the years. For example, from 1820 to 1945, it has been estimated that at least 59 million persons were killed during conflicts between groups of one type or another. Literature suggests that the number of fatalities nearly doubled between the years 1914 to 1964 as a result of further group conflict.

Group conflict can be separated into two sub-categories of conflict: inter-group conflict (in which distinct groups of individuals are at odds with one another), and intra-group conflict (in which select individuals that are part of the same group clash with one another). Although both forms of conflict have the ability to spiral upward in severity, it has been noted that conflict present at the group level (i.e., inter-group rivalries) is generally considered to be more powerful than conflict present at an individual level – a phenomenon known as the discontinuity effect.

== Intergroup conflict ==
=== Sources ===
Social psychology, specifically the discontinuity effect of inter-group conflict, suggests that "groups are generally even more competitive and aggressive than individuals". Two main sources of intergroup conflict have been identified: "competition for valued material resources, according to realistic conflict theory, or for social rewards like respect and esteem...as described by relative deprivation theory"

Group conflict can easily enter an escalating spiral of hostility marked by polarisation of views into black and white, with comparable actions viewed in diametrically opposite ways: "we offer concessions, but they attempt to lure us with ploys. We are steadfast and courageous, but they are unyielding, irrational, stubborn, and blinded by ideology".

It is widely believed that intergroup and intragroup hostility are (at least to some degree) inversely related: that "there is, unhappily, an inverse relationship between external wars and internal strife". Thus "in politics, for example, everyone can get an extraordinarily comforting feeling of mutual support from their group by focusing on an enemy". Freud described a similarly quasi-benign version, whereby "it is precisely communities with adjoining territories, and related to each other in other ways as well, who are engaged in constant feuds and ridiculing each other – like the Spaniards and Portuguese, for instance...[as] a convenient and relatively harmless satisfaction of the inclination to aggression, by means of which cohesion between the members of the community is made easier". The harder version of the theory would suggest that "pent-up sub-group aggression, if it cannot combine with the pent-up aggression of other sub-groups to attack a common, foreign enemy, will vent itself in the form of riots, persecutions and rebellions".

=== Belief domains that contribute ===
Through an extensive literature review, Roy J. Eidelson and Judy I. Eidelson, identified parallels between individuals and the collective world views of groups on the basis of five key belief domains.

- Superiority: At an individual level, this belief revolves around a person's enduring conviction that he or she is better than other people in important ways. At the group level, superiority includes shared convictions of moral superiority, entitlement, being the chosen and having a special destiny. Being chosen, the belief that one's own group has a superior cultural heritage (e.g., history, values, language, tradition) is common among groups who base their identity on their ethnicity. The development of Hitler's ideology of Aryans as a "master race" is one example of this belief. This belief can be unconscious, with group members unaware – "The power and influence of such a worldview are directly related to its operation as an invisible veil, which makes it difficult for individuals, groups, and institutions to see their harmful consequences". These authors noted that several committees studying racism were using the term ethnocentric monoculturalism to describe this belief in the superiority of your own group's cultural heritage (including history, values, language, traditions, arts and crafts, etc.) over that of other groups. As part of this belief system they also noted a corresponding belief in the inferiority of all other group's heritage, the ability to impose their standards and beliefs on less powerful groups, evidence of the group's core beliefs and values in their practices, programs and policies as well as in the institutions and structures of the group's society, and that they were able to operate outside the level of conscious awareness.
- Injustice: At the individual level, this belief revolves around perceived mistreatment by others, and/or the world at large. At the group level, this translates to a world view that the ingroup has significant and legitimate grievances against an outgroup. This belief is seen as contributing greatly to the impetus for war over the past two centuries, as the majority of wars in that time period have centered on issues of justice rather than security or power (Welch, 1993). Injustice, in a group setting, can be based on the shared belief that their group has not achieved desired outcomes due to the actions or inactions of a more powerful group that has created a biased or undesirable outcome, and not due to the inadequacies or actions of the group itself. Volkan termed the phrase Chosen Traumas to refer to the "mental representation of an event that has caused a large group to face drastic losses, feel helpless and victimized by another group" that are distorted to perpetuate the injustice belief.
- Vulnerability: At the individual level, vulnerability refers to a person's belief that he or she is perpetually in harm's way. At the group level, this belief is manifested in the form of fears about the future. This vulnerability can manifest itself in a group as catastrophic thinking – when the envisioned worst-case scenario is seen as being inevitable. Chirot (2001) notes that the genocides of Armenia, Germany, Cambodia, and Rwanda shared a common belief that "if they did not destroy their real or imagined enemies first, they would themselves be annihilated" (p. 10).
- Distrust: At the individual level, this belief focuses on the presumed intent of others to cause harm and/or exhibit hostility. The notion of trust is often seen by psychologists as the first challenge of psychosocial development. At the group level, this worldview focuses specifically on the perspective that outgroups are dishonest, untrustworthy and have negative intentions toward the in group. In more extreme manifestations, this belief is similar to collective paranoia, which is defined as collectively held beliefs, either false or exaggerated that cluster around ideas of being harmed, harassed, threatened, or otherwise disparaged by malevolent outgroups Even when no such hostility exists, this distrust belief can cause group members to see any behavior by the other as hostile and malevolent.
- Helplessness: At the individual level, helplessness focuses on the belief that even carefully planned and executed actions will fail to produce the desired outcome. When taken at the group level, it translates into a collective mindset of powerlessness and dependency. The group shares a pessimistic approach which focuses on their own weaknesses, and attributes setbacks to their own limitations. Helplessness, when it exists as a shared belief within a group, serves as a constraint on organized political movement, as those who participate in a social movement must see themselves as capable of righting the wrongs they perceive.

Donald Horowitz also argues that the belief, regardless of its accuracy, that ones group is behind another group can also contribute to conflict and that such groups often face severe anxiety about threats emanating from other groups. The backwards group fears it will be ultimately dominated by more advanced groups. Backwards groups tend to view their individual members with negative qualities, such as laziness and lack of intelligence, while collectively they view themselves as unorganized and lacking unity, with members looking out only for themselves and not their group. In contrast, advanced groups' members are perceived as possessing positive qualities, such as conscientiousness, intelligence and industriousness, while collectively they are perceived as well-organized, cohesive and committed to advancing their group interests. Thus advanced groups are perceived as possessing superior attributes on both individual and collective levels. The resultant anxiety felt by backwards groups can cause them to believe their very survival as a group is a stake and that they risk disappearing, replaced by more advanced groups. Horowitz argues this means backwards groups are more likely to initiate violence.

== Intragroup conflict (infighting) ==
=== Sources ===
- Task conflict: Task conflict arises when intra-group members disagree on issues that are relevant to meeting shared goals. Effective groups and organizations make use of these conflicts to make plans, foster creativity, solve problems and resolve misunderstandings. However, people who disagree with the group do so at their own peril, even when their position is reasonable. Dissenters often receive a high level of animosity from other group members, are less well-liked, assigned low-status tasks, and are sometimes ostracized.
- Process conflict: Process conflict refers to disagreement over the methods or procedures the group should use in order to complete its tasks. It occurs when strategies, policies, and procedures clash. For example, some group members may suggest discussing conflicting ideas, while other group members prefer to put conflicting ideas to a vote. In essence, during procedural conflicts, group members disagree on how to disagree. Situations of procedural conflict can be preemptively minimized by adopting formal rules (e.g., bylaws, constitutions, statements of policies) that specify goals, decisional processes, and responsibilities.
- Personal conflict: Personal conflicts, also known as affective conflicts, personality conflicts, emotional conflicts, or relationship conflicts, are conflicts that occur when group members dislike one another. Personal dislikes do not always result in conflict, but people often mention their negative feelings toward another group member when complaining about their groups. Also, there is evidence that a large proportion of group conflicts are indeed personal conflicts. One study of high level corporate executives revealed that 40% of disputes were due to "individual enmity between the principals without specific reference to other issues" (Morrill, 1995, p. 69). Criticism, when one person evaluates another, or his/her work negatively, is one common cause of personal conflict.

=== Political ===
Opinion is divided about the merits of infighting in political movements. Whereas "the majority of scholars view infighting as sapping political potency", others argue that "infighting's value lay in its potential to generate strategic possibilities and promote...accountability", and that (at least with respect to identity politics) "infighting is a key site for culture...concretizes cultural conversations".

Among extremists "threatened by the existence of anyone else, unless that other person's views seem identical to his own", however, infighting and group fissions become the destructive norm: "they're all splitting up so fast...they seem to attack each other more than they attack their real enemies on the other side of the political spectrum".

=== Small group ===
Within small groups, the same dichotomy exists. Granted that both constructive and destructive conflict occurs in most small groups, it is very important to accentuate the constructive conflict and minimize the destructive conflict. Conflict is bound to happen, but if used constructively need not be a bad thing.

Using constructive conflict within small groups by bringing up problems and alternative solutions (while still valuing others) allows the group to work forward. While "conflict may involve interpersonal as well as task issues", keeping a window open for dissent can prove very advantageous, as where a company "reaped big benefits because it did not simply try to suppress conflict, but allowed minority influence to prevail".

On the other hand, there is evidence that an organizational culture of disrespect unproductively "generates a morass of status games and infighting...'it's made people turn against each other'" - so that for example "sexual harassment becomes a chronic accompaniment to broader patterns of infighting".

=== Individual-Group Conflict ===
Individual-Group conflict occurs between an individual in the group and the group as a whole. This conflict can occur quite easily. Problems can arise if the individual's needs or goals differ from the groups. A common problem between an individual and their group is levels of commitment. An individual can feel different levels of commitment and transition into different roles within the group. There are then five stages the individual can go through in their membership: "investigation, socialization, maintenance, resocialization, and remembrance". Along with these stages, there are also different types of transition the individual can go through: "entry, acceptance, divergence, and exit". These stages and transitions can affect the individual's personal values and commitment levels.

=== Group-Group Conflict ===
Group-Group conflict occurs between two or more different groups. This conflict commonly happens when the two groups are fighting and working towards the same goal. This can create contact and tension between the groups. Groups may be drawn into conflict with each other on the basis of performance, importance to particular groups and, in general, union – management rivalries. Although there may be conflict between groups, their members may still come into contact with one another. Contact between the intergroup can promote forgiveness and sometimes result in a reconciliation between groups. This contact between groups can also help group members form new opinions about the other, reduce prejudice, and promote acceptance. An example of group-group conflict would be if two coffee shops in one town are fighting to bring in more customers than the other. Another factor that could cause problems between groups is geographic location. Conflict tends to have negative consequences for both the individual and the organization. There are numerous negative effects of group-group conflict. For example, individuals in the group tend to have an increased lack of interest in work, higher job dissatisfaction, and more work anxiety.

== Perspectives ==
=== Psychoanalysis ===
Lacan saw the roots of intra-group aggression in a regression to the "narcissistic moment in the subject", highlighting "the aggressivity involved in the effects of all regression, all arrested development, all rejection of typical development in the subject". Neville Symington also saw narcissism as a key element in group conflict, singling out "organizations so riven by narcissistic currents that...little creative work was done". Such settings provide an opening for "many egoistic instinct-feelings - as the desire to dominate and humiliate your fellow, the love of conflict - your courage and power against mine - the satisfaction of being the object of jealousy, the pleasures derived from the exercise of cunning, deceit and concealment". Fischer (2012) distinguished between two forms of intragroup conflict in organizations. In a "restorative" form, paranoid-schizoid "splitting" can be transformed through scapegoating dynamics to produce reparative ("depressive") intragroup relations. In a contrasting "perverse" form, intragroup trauma causes paranoid-schizoid functioning to fragment, resulting in an intersubjective "entanglement" with sadomasochistic dynamics.

Nevertheless, psychoanalysts have not been able to evade the constraints of group conflict themselves: "Envy, rivalry, power conflicts, the formation of small groups, resulting in discord and intrigue, are a matter of course" in the psychoanalytic world, for example, with institutions being "caught up in the factionalism of the ...struggle between the ins and the outs".

=== Girard ===
René Girard saw "collective violence as sacred...[as] the great remedy for communal life". He saw the violence directed at the group scapegoat as "absorbing all the internal tensions, feuds, and rivalries pent up within the community...a deliberate act of collective substitution".

His view parallels the Freudian approach, rooted in Totem and Taboo, which considers that "transgression... is at the origin of a higher complexity, something to which the realm of civilization owes its development". Freud saw violence as standing at the root of the social bond – "what prevails is no longer the violence of an individual but that of a community" – and thus "politics made out of delinquency...the social contract establishes corporate virtue as an asylum for individual sin".

Girard concluded therefore that regression and 'the dissolution of differences encourages the proliferation of the double bind...spells the disintegration of social institutions', to reveal the group conflict latent at their core.

== Literary examples ==
- Sallust considered that the civil feuds which brought down the Roman Republic "had set in when the destruction of Rome's mighty enemy Carthage left her without an incentive to self-discipline".
- Shakespeare had Henry IV urge his son, 'Be it thy course to busy giddy minds/With foreign quarrels'
- Swift's view of the divided Tory party at the end of Queen Anne's reign was that "a ship's crew quarrelling in a storm, or while their enemies are within gunshot, is but a faint idea of this infatuation".

== See also ==
- Divide and rule
- Group narcissism
- Narcissism of small differences
- Organizational conflict
- Political faction
- Scapegoat theory of intergroup conflict
- Sectarianism
- Social undermining
- Team effectiveness
- Socionics
