= Racial threat =

Sociology concept

Broadly speaking, the term racial threat refers to how people react to those of a different race. More specifically, the racial threat hypothesis or racial threat theory proposes that a higher population of members of a minority race results in the dominant race imposing higher levels of social control on the subordinate race, which, according to this hypothesis, occurs as a result of the dominant race fearing the subordinate race's political, economic, or criminal threat. Racial threat theory is also known as minority group threat theory. In his 1949 book, political scientist V. O. Key found that white voters in the U.S. South turned out at higher rates and voted more for conservative politicians in areas with high levels of African-Americans; Key argued that whites felt threatened by African-Americans, thus becoming more politically motivated.

Research has shown a strong association between the size of a state's nonwhite prison population and the likelihood of that state enacting a felon disenfranchisement law, which supports a link between racial threat and the passage of such laws. A 2016 study by Harvard University political scientist Ryan Enos, which relied on a quasi-experimental design, found that when public housing projects in Chicago were removed over the period 2000–2004, turnout among white voters decreased substantially and white voters were less likely to vote for conservatives.

== See also ==
- Group threat theory
