= Reitman v. Mulkey =

- Supreme Court of the United States

Argued March 20–21, 1967 Decided May 29, 1967
- Full case name: Reitman v. Mulkey
- Citations: 387 U.S. 369 (more) 87 S. Ct. 1627; 18 L. Ed. 2d 830; 1967 U.S. LEXIS 1324

Case history
- Prior: Mulkey v. Reitman, 64 Cal.2d 529, 50 Cal.Rptr. 881, 413 P.2d 825 (1966); cert. granted, 385 U.S. 967 (1966).

Holding
- California Proposition 14 violates the Equal Protection Clause of the Fourteenth Amendment

Court membership
- Chief Justice Earl Warren Associate Justices Hugo Black · William O. Douglas; Tom C. Clark · John M. Harlan II; William J. Brennan Jr. · Potter Stewart; Byron White · Abe Fortas

Case opinions
- Majority: White, joined by Warren, Brennan, Fortas, Douglas
- Concurrence: Douglas
- Dissent: Harlan, joined by Black, Clark, Stewart

Laws applied
- U.S. Const. amend. XIV

Reitman v. Mulkey, 387 U.S. 369 (1967), was a United States Supreme Court decision that set an important legal precedent that held that a state could not authorize invidious discrimination by private landlords without entangling itself in the ensuing discriminatory private decisions. Thus, the state constitutional amendment by referendum purporting to authorize landlord freedom was unconstitutional.

== Background ==
In 1963, the Rumford Fair Housing Act (AB 1240) was introduced in the California State Assembly, by Assemblyman William Byron Rumford. The act banned racial discrimination among mortgage holders, real estate brokers, property owners and landlords who refuse to rent or sell to tenants or potential buyers on the basis of color. The bill passed the California Legislature on September 20, 1963 and was later signed into law by California Governor Pat Brown.

The act faced immediate protest after it was passed, and faced an initiative and referendum challenge; with opponents collecting over 600,000 signatures—well more than the 468,259 required to add the referendum to the ballot. The referendum saw significant financial support from California's real-estate industry, with the California Real Estate Association and the Apartment House Owners Association leading the effort to rescind the law. The "Committee for Home Protection" was initiated by the real-estate industry in the lead up to the laws challenge; looking to garner support with their slogan: "A man's home is his castle."

The referendum, officially called California Proposition 14, Art. I, § 26, stated that neither the State nor any agency thereof "shall deny, limit or abridge, directly or indirectly, the right of any person, who is willing or desires to sell, lease or rent any part or all of his real property, to decline to sell, lease or rent such property to such person or persons as he, in his absolute discretion, chooses."

The referendum passed on November 3, 1964, with two-thirds of Californians voting to repeal the law. A legal challenge was then brought to Proposition 14 in the California Supreme Court by the National Association for the Advancement of Colored People. The California Supreme Court held that Art. I, § 26, was designed to overturn state laws prohibiting discrimination, encouraged discrimination and unconstitutionally involved the State in racial discrimination, and was therefore invalid under the Equal Protection Clause of the Fourteenth Amendment to the United States Constitution.

== Supreme Court ==
The case was appealed to the U.S. Supreme Court, which upheld the California Supreme Court in a 5–4 decision. The Supreme Court focused on examining the constitutionality of § 26 in terms of its "immediate objective" its "ultimate effect" and its "historical context and the conditions existing prior to its enactment." The Court pointed to its decision in McCabe v. Atchison, Topeka & Santa Fe Railway Co. that this was nothing less than considering a permissive state statute as an authorization to discriminate and as sufficient state action to violate the Fourteenth Amendment in the context of that case. Therefore, the California Supreme Court was correct in holding that this amendment encouraged discrimination and thus violated the 14th Amendment.

This case can be compared to Washington v. Seattle School District No. 1 where the court held that a statewide initiative that was designed primarily to put an end to a newly formed busing program in Seattle was unconstitutional. Thus collectively these cases stand for the proposition that, non-constitutionally required racially based desegregation programs may be repealed, must be repealed by the level of government that develops the program. That is a state can not change the rules just so that a municipality cannot institute a desegregation program.

== See also ==
- List of United States Supreme Court cases, volume 387
