= List of police ranks in Asia =

Element of hierarchy in law enforcement

Police ranks are a system of hierarchical relationships in police organizations. The rank system defines authority and responsibility in a police organization, and affects the culture within the police force. Police ranks, dependent on country, are similar to military ranks in function and design due to policing in many countries developing from military organizations and operations, such as in Western Europe, former Soviet countries, and English-speaking countries. Usually, uniforms denote the bearer's rank by particular insignia affixed to the uniforms.

Rank is not only used to designate leadership, but to establish pay-grade as well. As rank increases, pay-grade follows, but so does the amount of responsibility.

== Azerbaijan ==
Officers

Rank group	General / flag officers			Senior officers			Junior officers
Police of Azerbaijan
Police of Azerbaijan	Police colonel general Polis general-polkovniki	Police lieutenant general Polis general-leytenantı	Police major general Polis general-mayoru	Police colonel Polis polkovniki	Police lieutenant colonel Polis polkovnik-leytenantı	Police major Polis mayoru	Police captain Polis kapitanı	Police senior lieutenant Polis baş leytenantı	Police lieutenant Polis leytenantı	Police sub-lieutenant Polis kiçik leytenantı	Police cadet Polis kursantı

Enlisted

Rank group	Senior NCOs		Junior NCOs	Enlisted
Police of Azerbaijan
Police of Azerbaijan	Police senior sergeant Polis baş serjantı	Police sergeant Polis serjantı	Police junior sergeant Polis kiçik serjantı	Police private Polis sıravi

== Bangladesh ==
Superior officers

Rank group	General / flag officers			Senior officers			Junior officers
Bangladesh Police
Bangladesh Police	Inspector General of Police	Additional Inspector General of Police	Deputy Inspector General of Police	Additional Deputy Inspector General of Police	Assistant Inspector General of Police/Superintendent of Police (Note: Special Superintendent if in Special Branch or Criminal Investigation Department. Superintendent of Railway Police if in Railway Police.)	Additional Superintendent of Police	(Senior) Assistant; Superintendent of Police	Probationary Assistant; Superintendent of Police
Metropolitan branch		Commissioner of police (Note: In Dhaka Metropolitan Police)	Commissioner of police Additional police commissioner (Note: In Dhaka Metropolitan Police)	Additional police commissioner Joint commissioner of police (Note: Only in Dhaka Metropolitan Police)	Deputy commissioner of police	Additional deputy commissioner of police	Senior assistant commissioner of police	Assistant commissioner of police
Industrial police			Director general	Additional director general	Director	Deputy director	Senior assistant director	Assistant director

Subordinate officers

Rank group	Senior NCOs			Junior NCOs			Enlisted
Bangladesh Police
Bangladesh Police	Police Inspector	Sub-Inspector of Police	Police Sergeant		Assistant Sub-Inspector of Police	Police Nayek		Constable
Armed branch	Armed inspector of police			Armed sub-inspector	Armed assistant sub-inspector		Naik	Constable
Industrial police	Deputy assistant director			Circle commander	Assistant sub-inspector		Naik	Constable
Traffic division	Traffic inspector	Sergeant		Town sub-inspector	Assistant town sub-inspector			Traffic constable

== Brunei ==
Gazetted officers

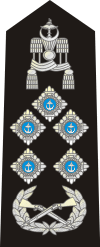
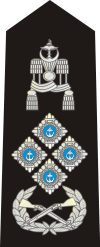
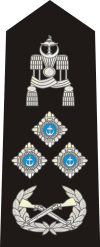
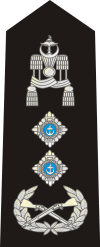
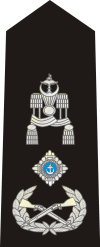
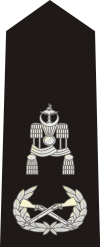
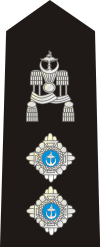
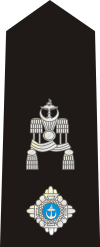
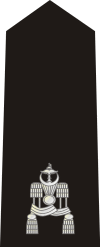
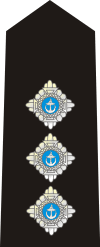
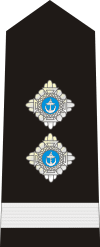
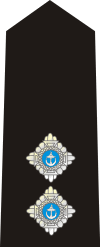
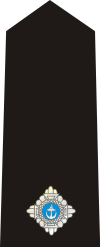
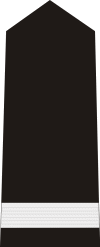
	Inspector general		Commissioner				Superintendent				Inspector
Royal Brunei Police Force
Royal Brunei Police Force	Inspector general of police	Deputy inspector general of police	Commissioner	Deputy commissioner	Senior assistant commissioner	Assistant commissioner	Senior superintendent	Superintendent	Deputy superintendent	Assistant superintendent	Senior inspector	Inspector	Probationary inspector	Cadet inspector

Non gazetted officers

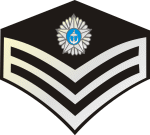
	Sergeant			Other
Royal Brunei Police Force						No insignia
Royal Brunei Police Force	Sergeant major	Staff sergeant	Sergeant	Corporal	Lance corporal	Constable

== China ==
=== People's Police ===
Chinese police officers use rank insignia on both side of shoulders on the duty uniform. Senior officers ranking at commissioner general and commissioner levels wear these on the white collar uniforms, and for supervisor level and below, officers wear them on the sky blue collar uniforms.

Officers

	Commissioners general		Commissioners			Supervisors
People's Police
People's Police	Commissioner general Chinese: 总警监 pinyin: zǒng jǐngjiān	Deputy commissioner general Chinese: 副总警监 pinyin: fù zǒng jǐngjiān	Commissioner 1st class Chinese: 一级警监 pinyin: yījí jǐngjiān	Commissioner 2nd class Chinese: 二级警监 pinyin: èrjí jǐngjiān	Commissioner 3rd class Chinese: 三级警监 pinyin: sānjí jǐngjiān	Supervisor 1st class Chinese: 一级警督 pinyin: yījí jǐngdū	Supervisor 2nd class Chinese: 二级警督 pinyin: èrjí jǐngdū	Supervisor 3rd class Chinese: 三级警督 pinyin: sānjí jǐngdū

Others

	Superintendents			Constables		Trainees
People's Police
People's Police	Superintendent 1st class Chinese: 一级警司 pinyin: yījí jǐngsī	Superintendent 2nd class Chinese: 二级警司 pinyin: èrjí jǐngsī	Superintendent 3rd class Chinese: 三级警司 pinyin: sānjí jǐngsī	Constable 1st class Chinese: 一级警员 pinyin: yījí jǐngyuán	Constable 2nd class Chinese: 二级警员 pinyin: èrjí jǐngyuán	Probationary constable Chinese: 见习警员 pinyin: jiànxí jǐngyuán	Cadet; Chinese: 学员 pinyin: xuéyuán

In China, ranks can be separate from position, and according to Article 8 of the "People's Republic of China's Law on People's Police Ranks", the following positions require an officer with the following ranks:

- The person(s) responsible for a Ministry level agency/unit of the People's Police has to be ranked Commissioner General
- The person(s) responsible for a deputy ministry level agency/unit of the People's Police has to be ranked Deputy Commissioner General
- The person(s) responsible for a Department level agency/unit of the People's police can be either ranked Commissioner First Class or Commissioner Second Class
- The person(s) responsible for a deputy department level agency/unit of the People's Police can either be a Commissioner Second Class or Commissioner Third Class
- The person(s) responsible for a division level agency/unit of the People's Police can be ranked between commissioner third class to supervisor second class
- The person(s) responsible for a deputy division level agency/unit can be ranked between Supervisor first class to supervisor third class
- The person(s) responsible for an office level agency/unit can be ranked between Supervisor 1st class to superintendent 1st class
- The person(s) responsible for a deputy office level agency/unit can be ranked between Supervisor 2nd class to Superintendent 2nd class
- Police sergeants can be ranked between Supervisor 3rd class to Superintendent 3rd class
- Police officers can be ranked between Superintendent 1st class to Constable 2nd class

=== Auxiliary police (Sichuan) ===
Insignia							
Rank (Chinese)	一级辅警长	二级辅警长	三级辅警长	一级辅员	二级辅员	三级辅员	实习辅警
Rank (English)	Auxiliary Sergeant 1st Class	Auxiliary Sergeant 2nd Class	Auxiliary Sergeant 3rd Class	Auxiliary Officer 1st Class	Auxiliary Officer 2nd Class	Auxiliary Officer 3rd Class	Probationary Auxiliary Officer

=== People's Armed Police ===
The People's Armed Police, as part of the People's Liberation Army, uses the same ranks and uniform as the PLA itself.

Officers

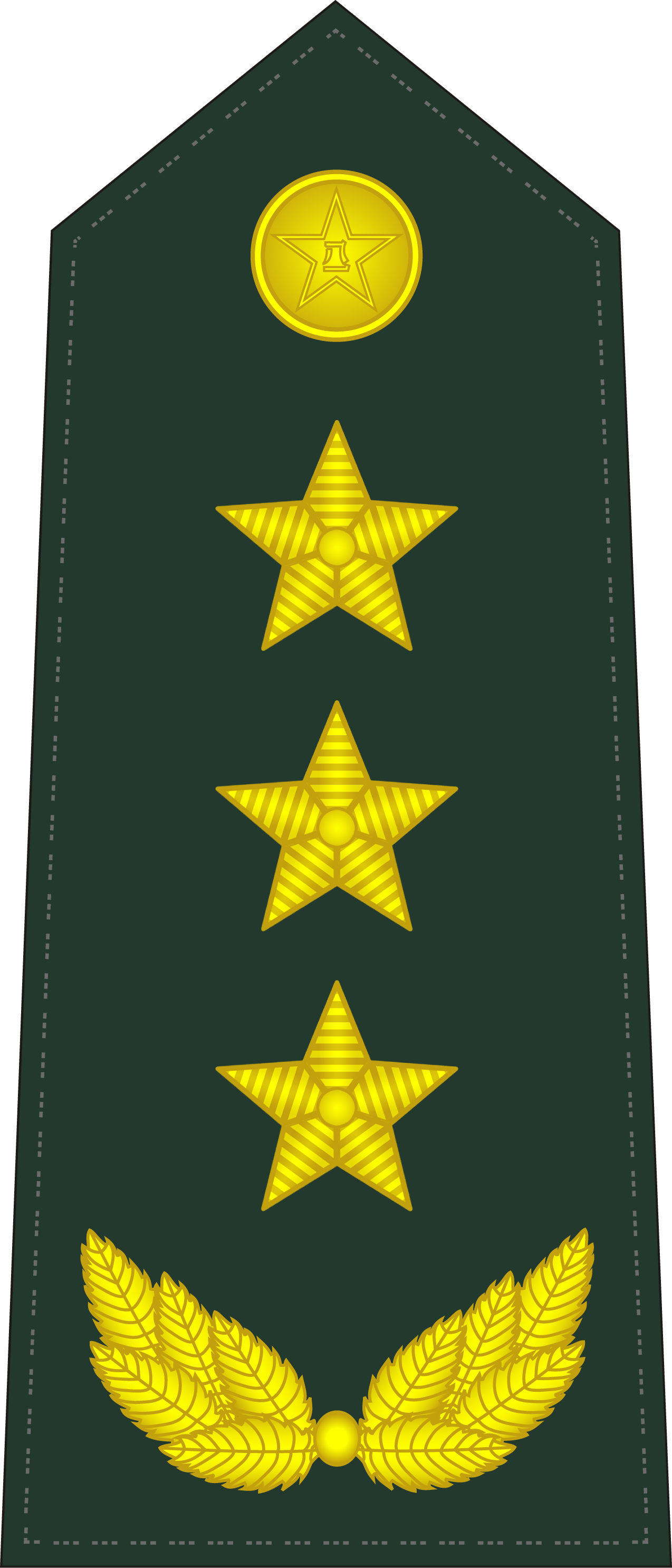
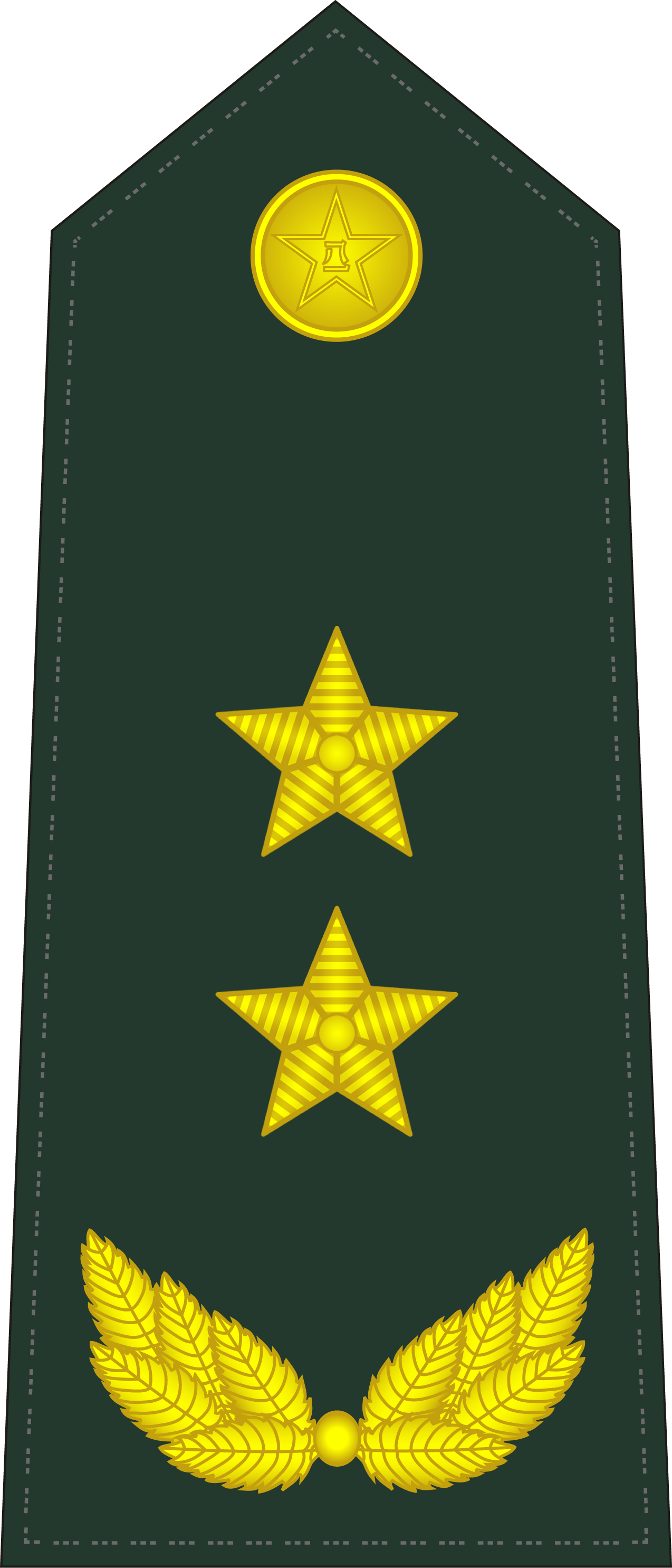
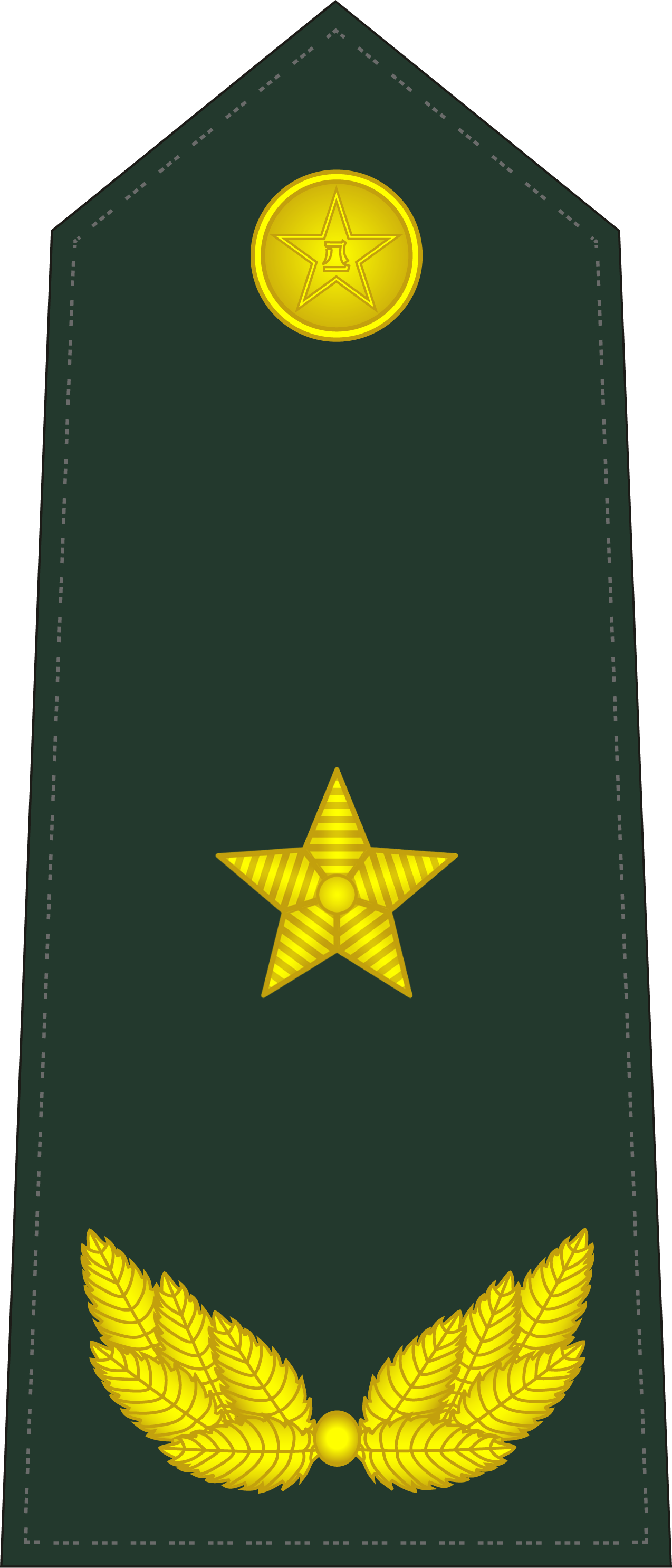
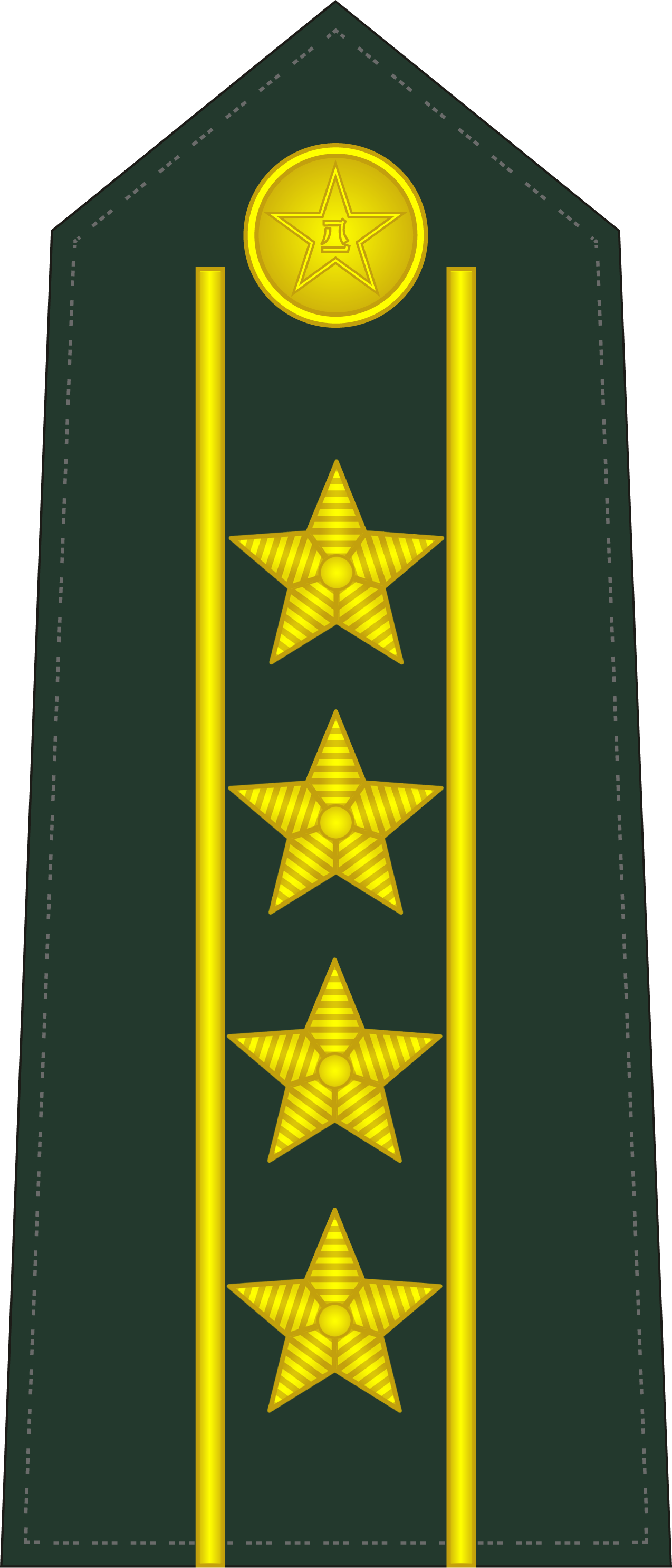
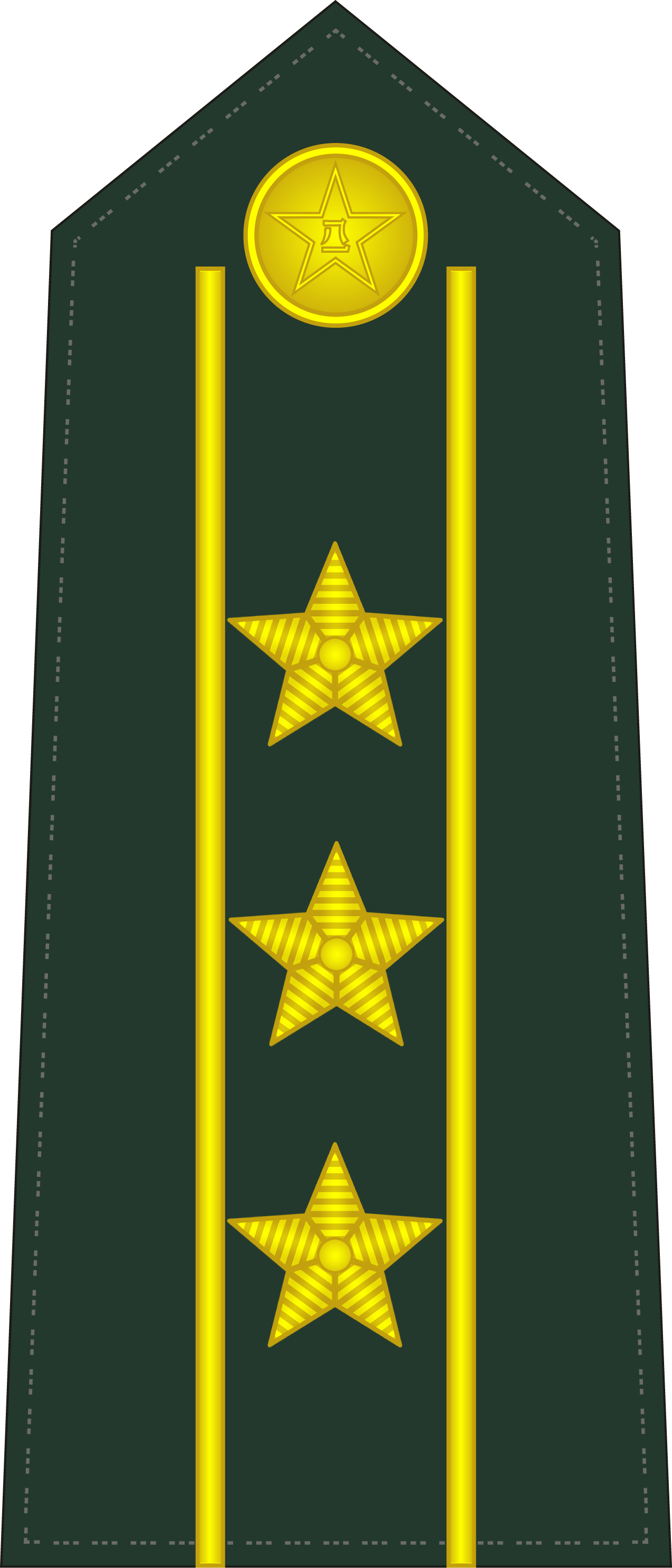
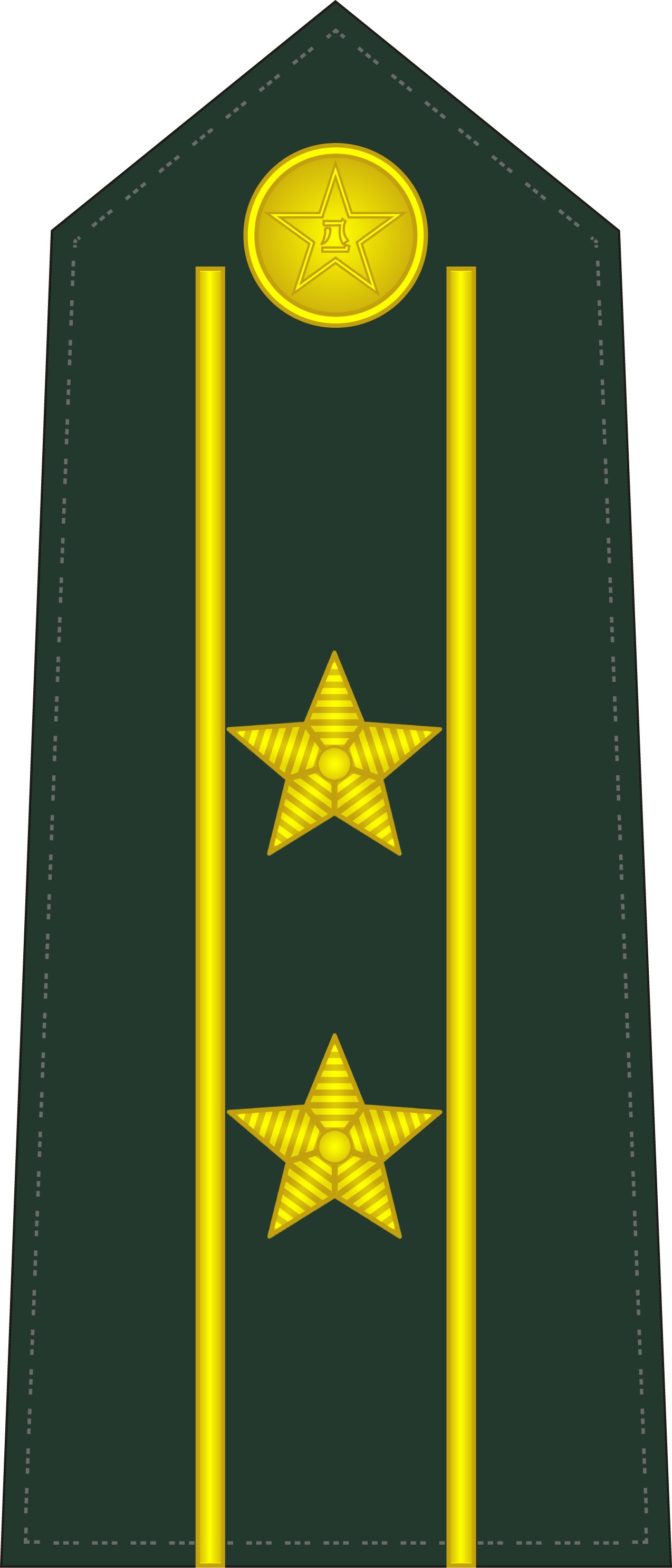
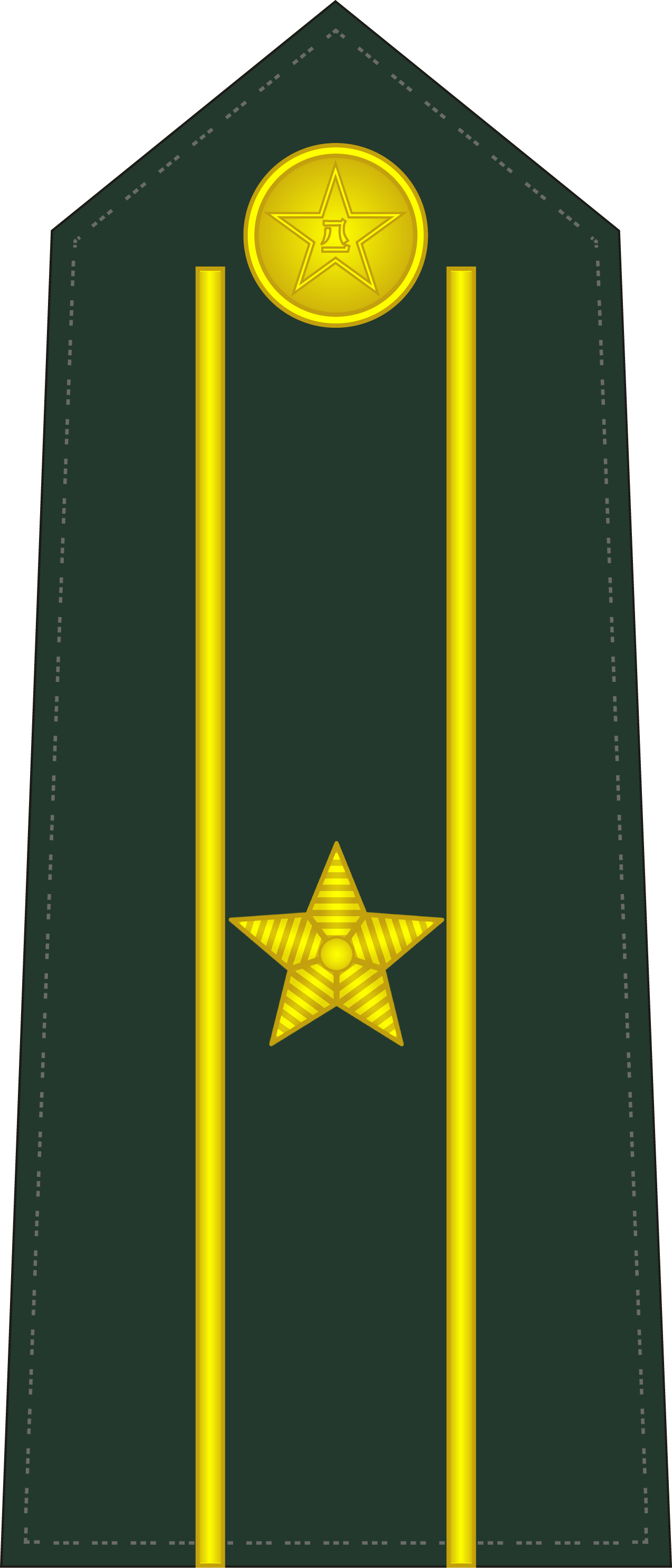
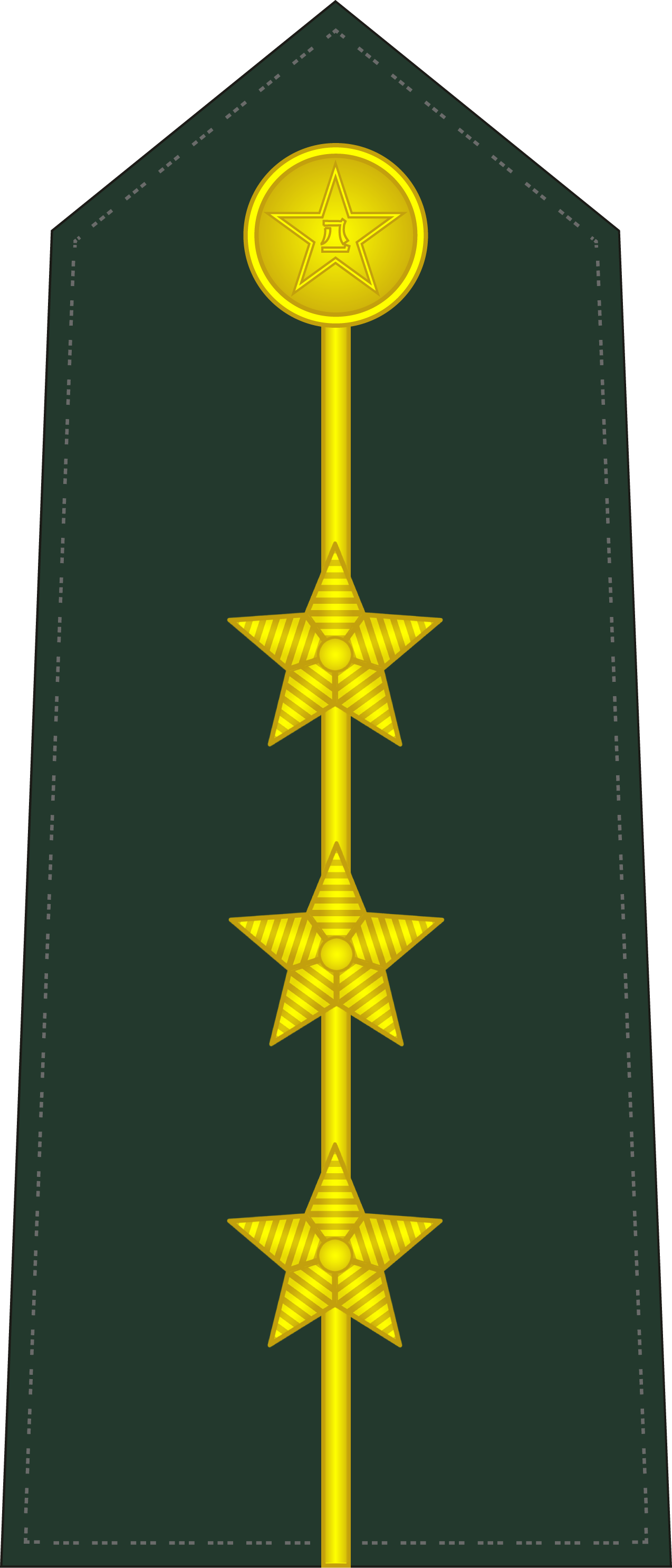
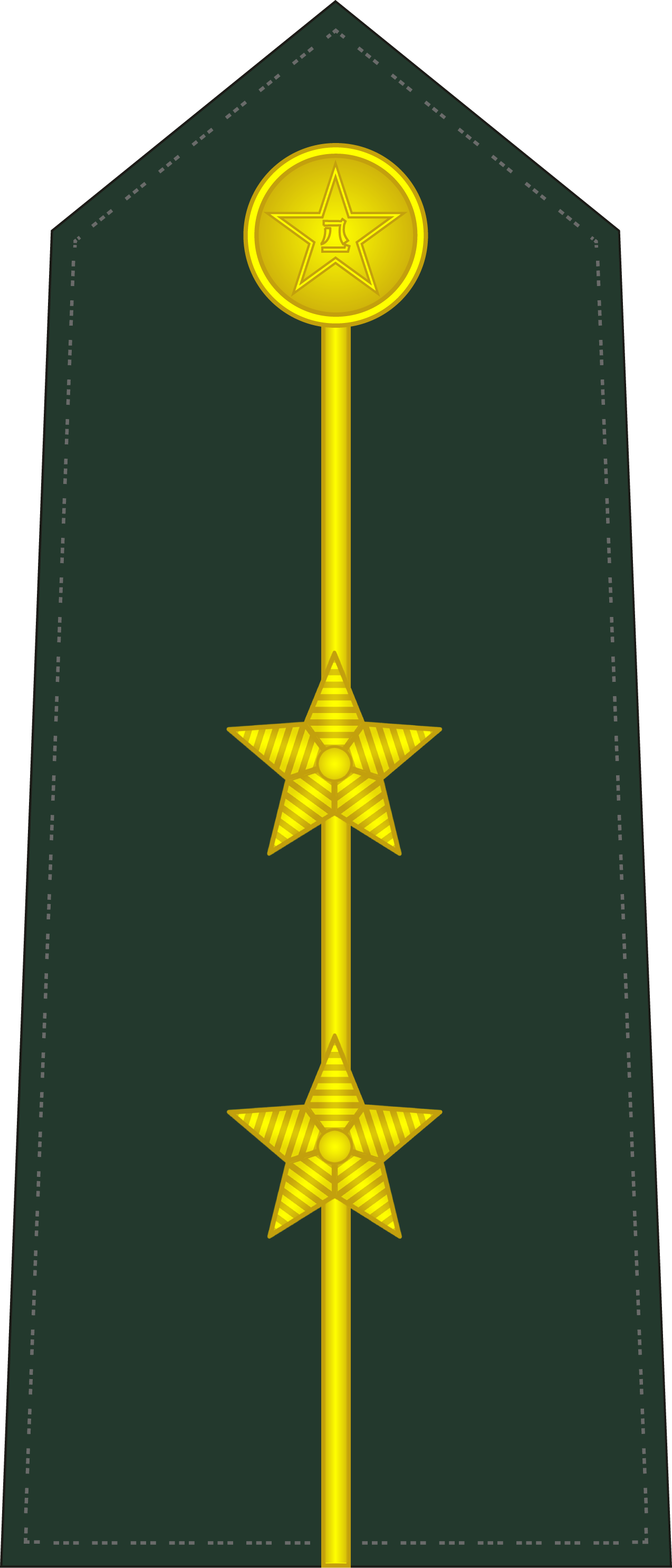
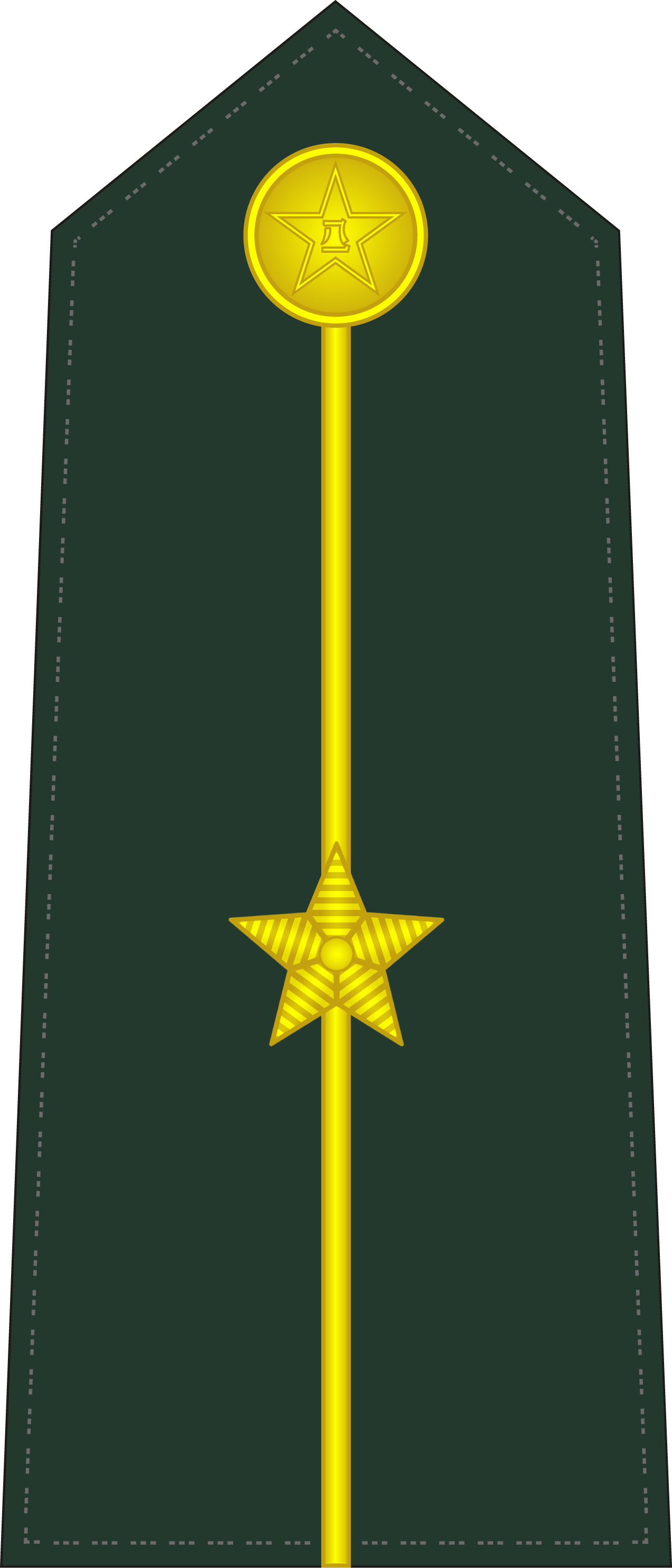
Rank group	General / flag officers			Senior officers				Junior officers
People's Armed Police
People's Armed Police	武警上将; Wǔjǐng Shàngjiàng	武警中将; Wǔjǐng Zhōngjiàng	武警少将; Wǔjǐng Shàojiàng	武警大校; Wǔjǐng Dàxiào	武警上校; Wǔjǐng Shàngxiào	武警中校; Wǔjǐng Zhōngxiào	武警少校; Wǔjǐng Shàoxiào	武警上尉; Wǔjǐng Shàngwèi	武警中尉; Wǔjǐng Zhōngwèi	武警少尉; Wǔjǐng Shàowèi

Non-commissioned officers and men

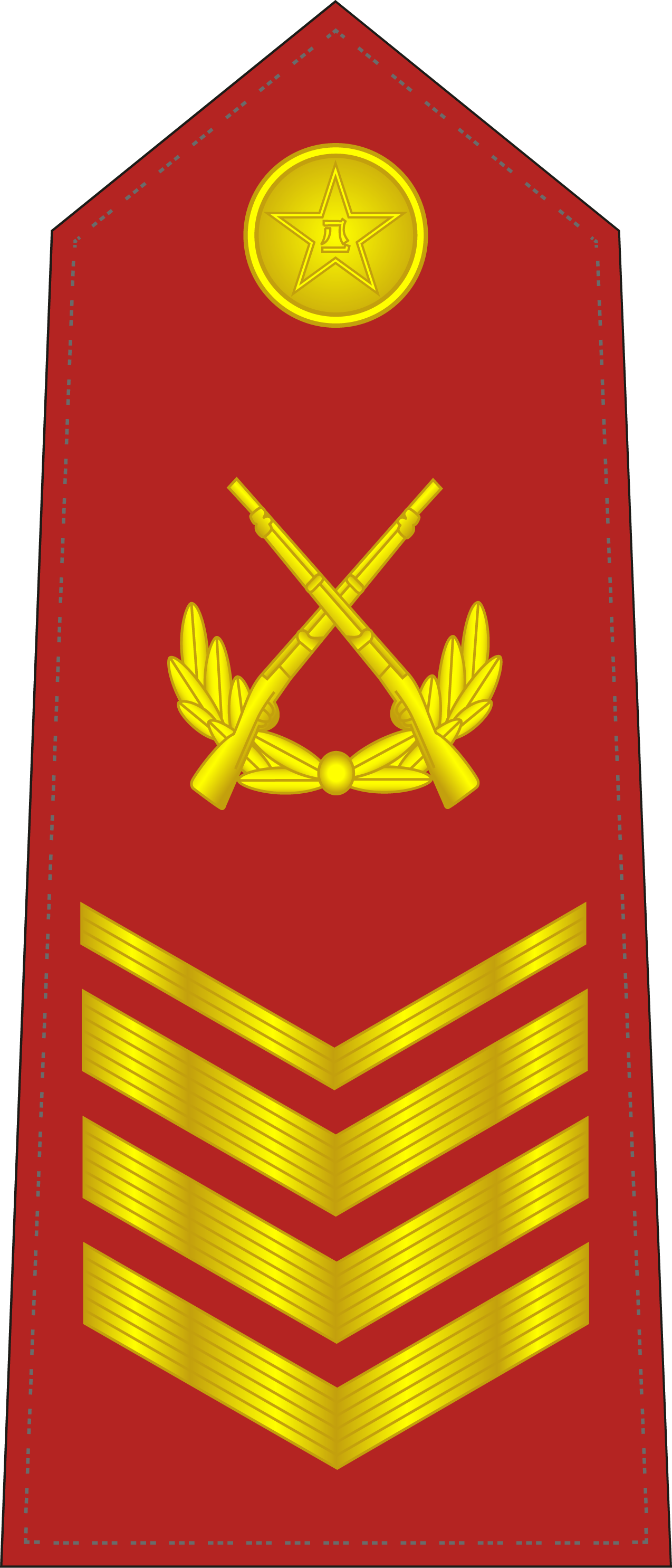
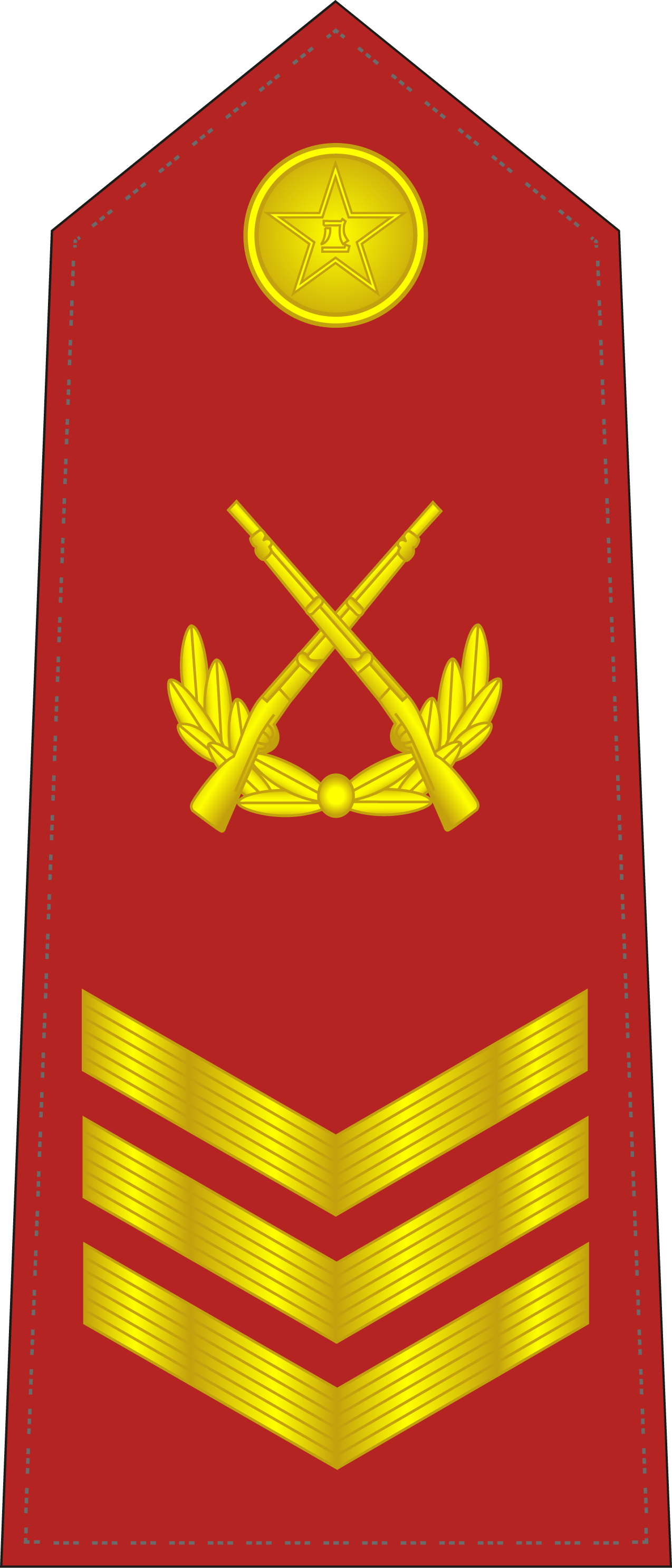
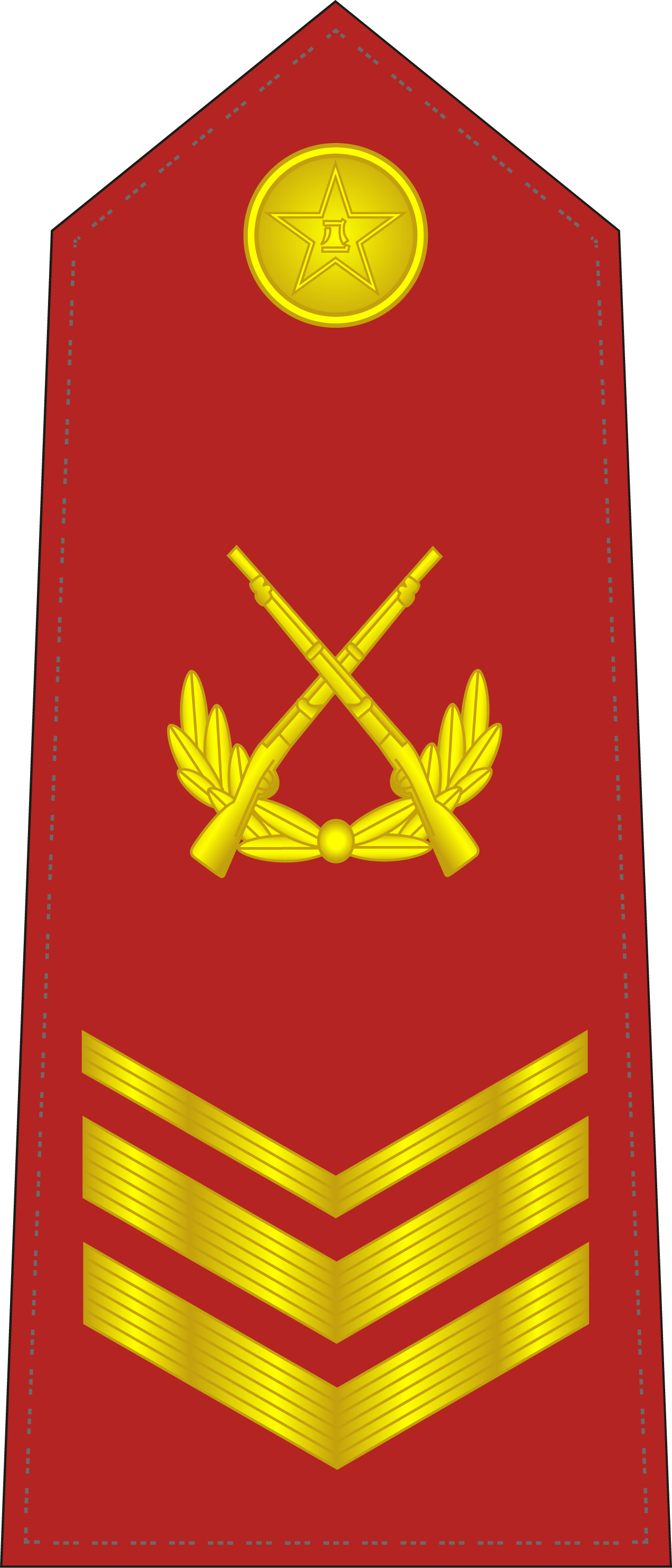
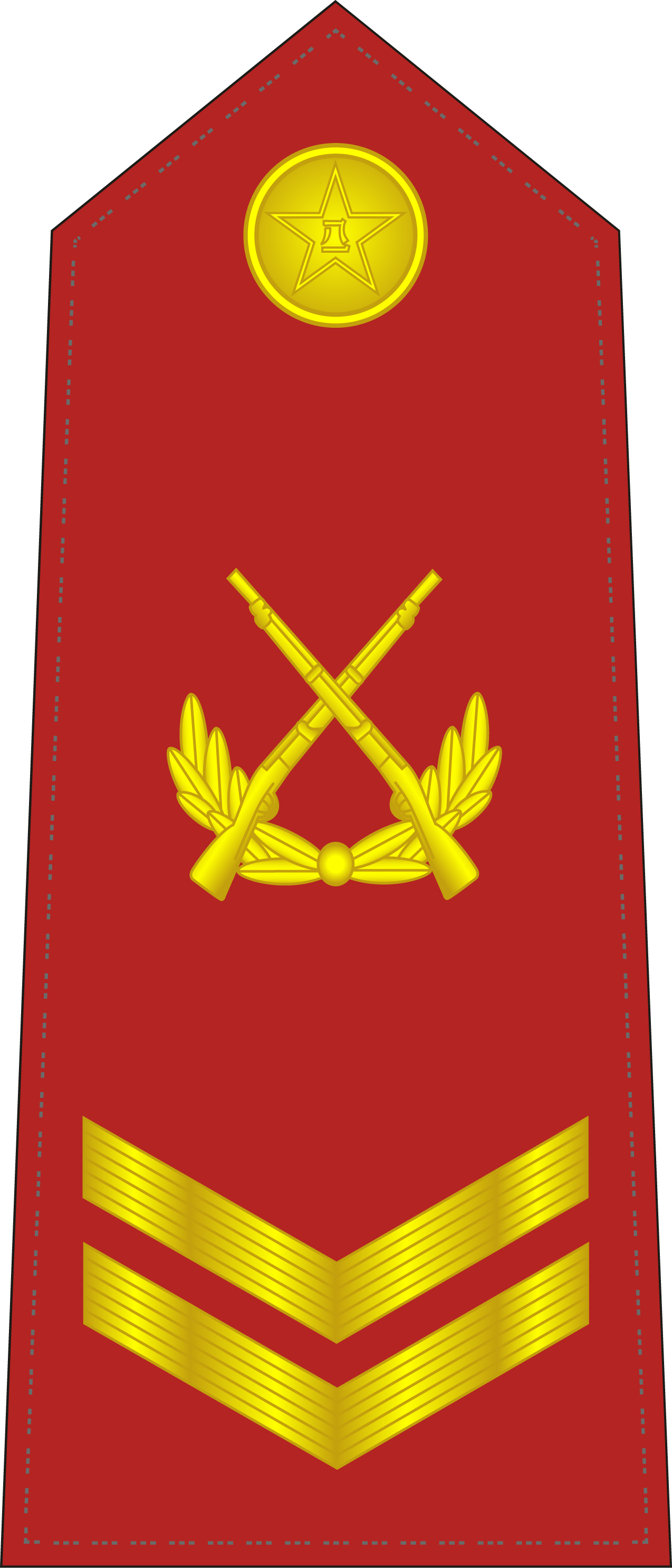
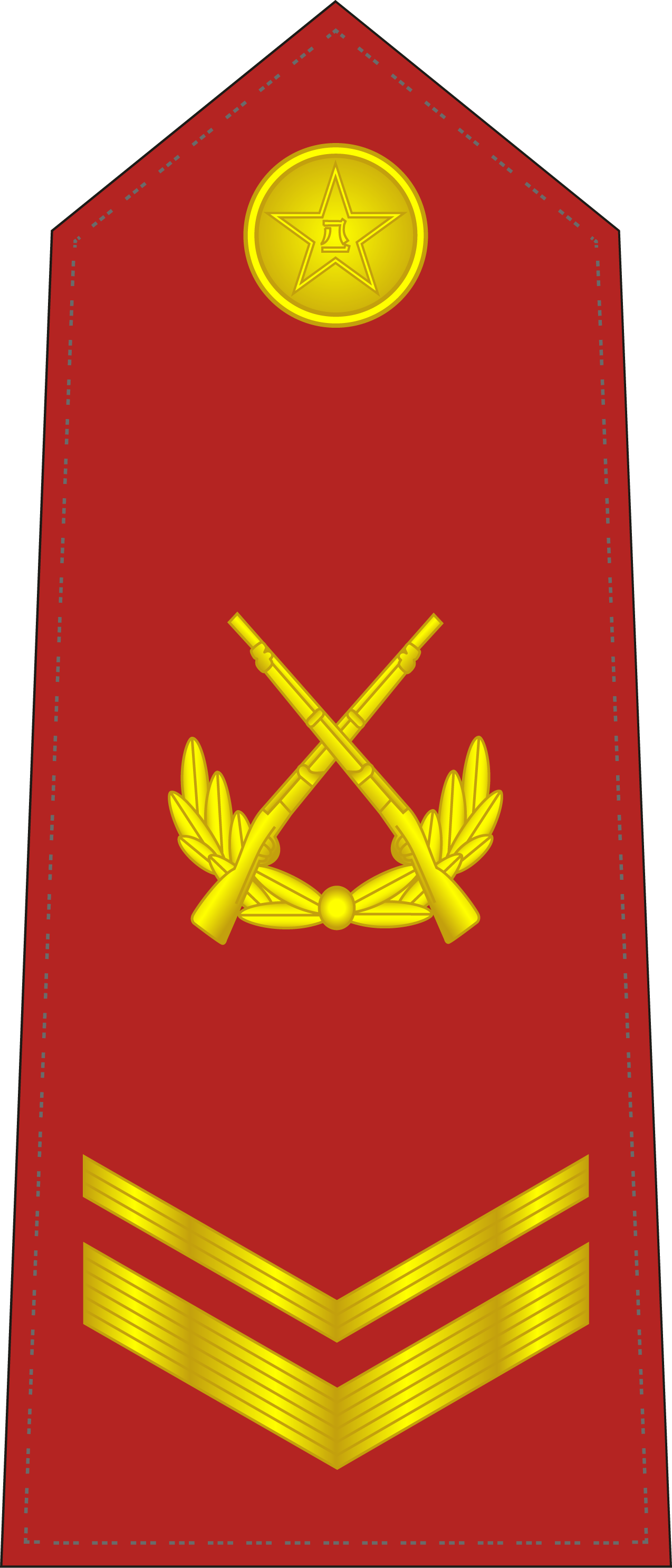
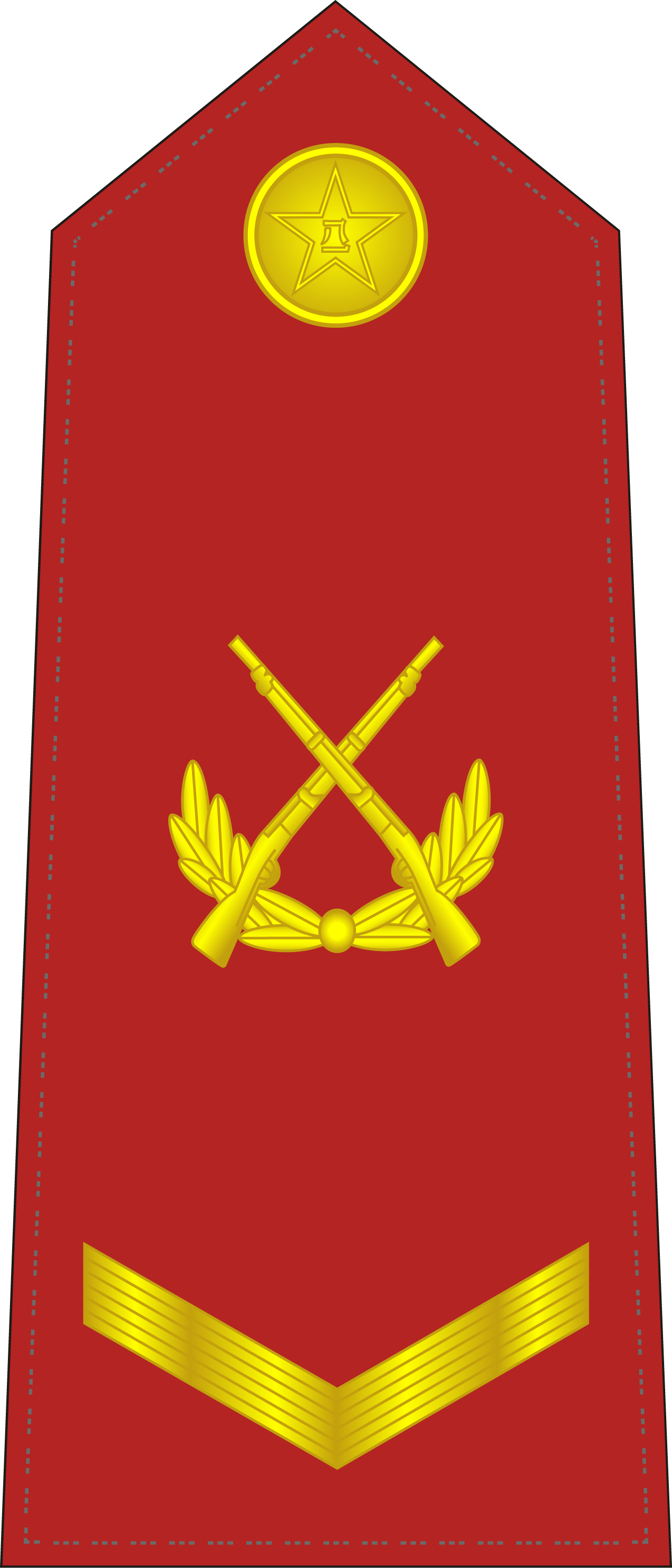
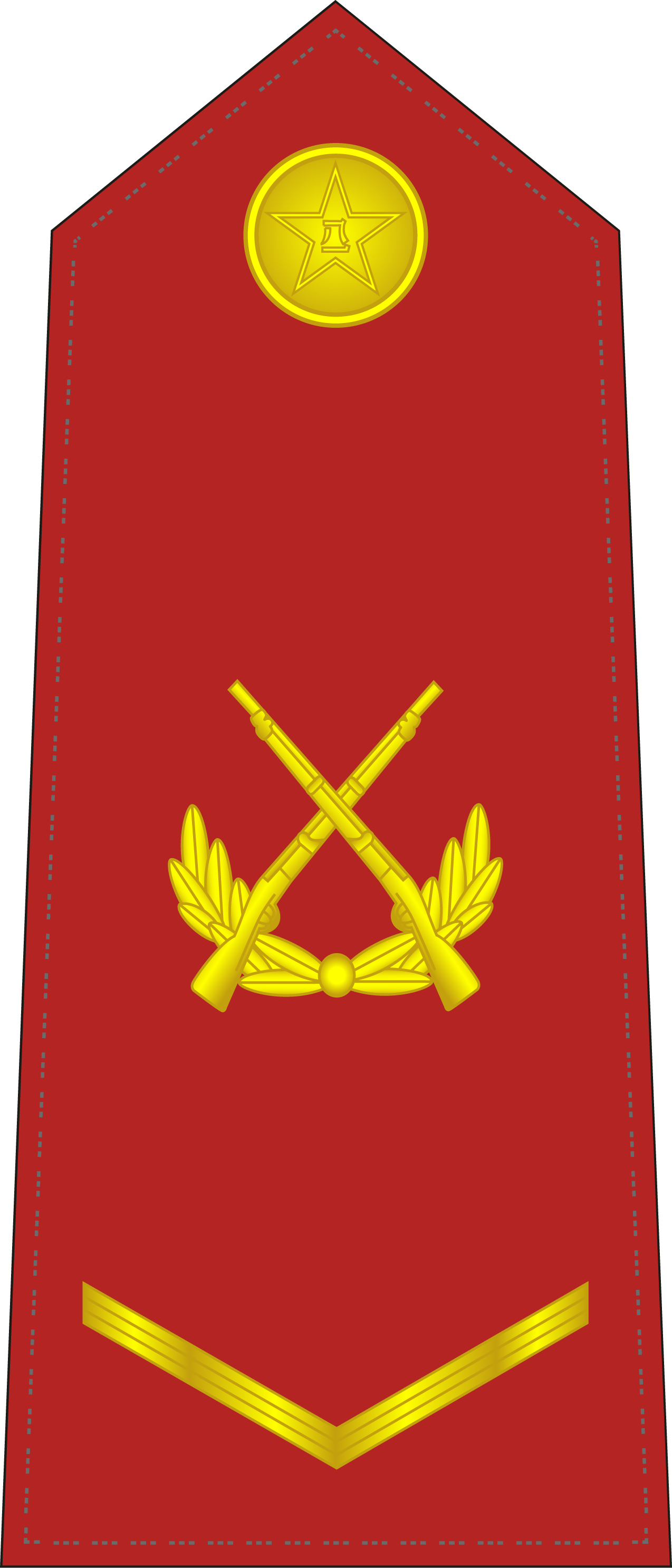
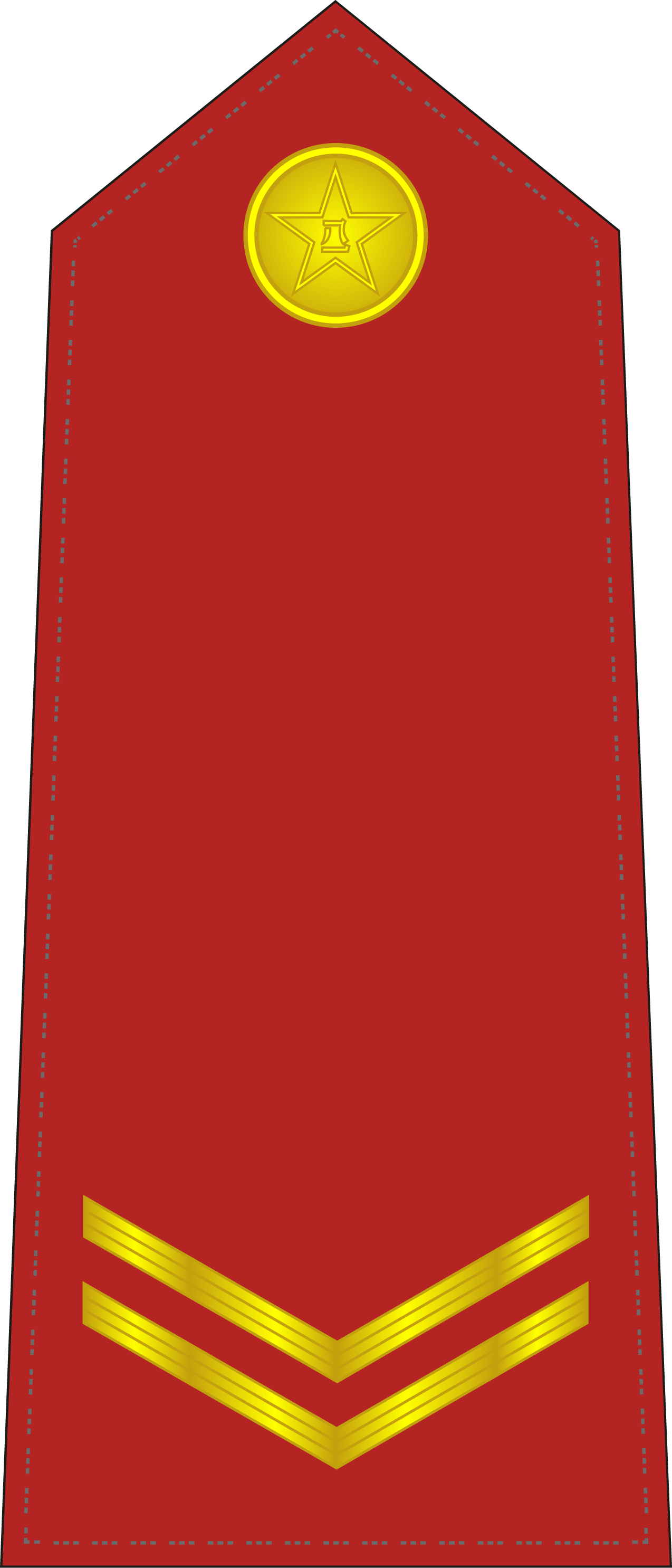
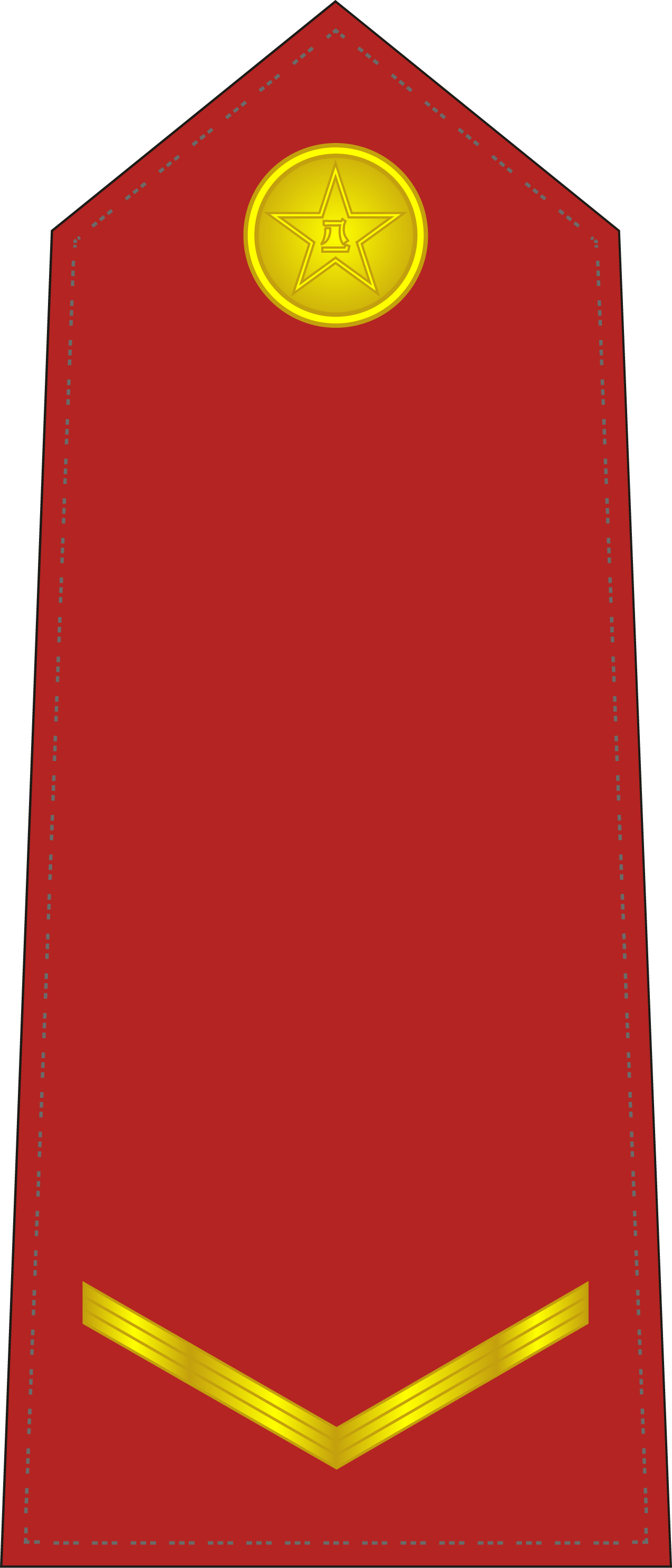
Rank group	Senior NCOs						Junior NCOs	Enlisted
People's Armed Police
People's Armed Police	武警一级警士长; Wǔjǐng Yījí jǐngshìzhǎng	武警二级警士长; Wǔjǐng Èrjí jǐngshìzhǎng	武警三级警士长; Wǔjǐng Sānjí jǐngshìzhǎng	武警四级警士长; Wǔjǐng Sìjí jǐngshìzhǎng	武警上士; Wǔjǐng Shàngshì	武警中士; Wǔjǐng Zhōngshì	武警下士; Wǔjǐng Xiàshì	武警上等兵; Wǔjǐng Shàngděngbīng	武警列兵; Wǔjǐng Lièbīng

Units of the China Coast Guard wear identical insignia as a part of the PAP.

== Hong Kong ==
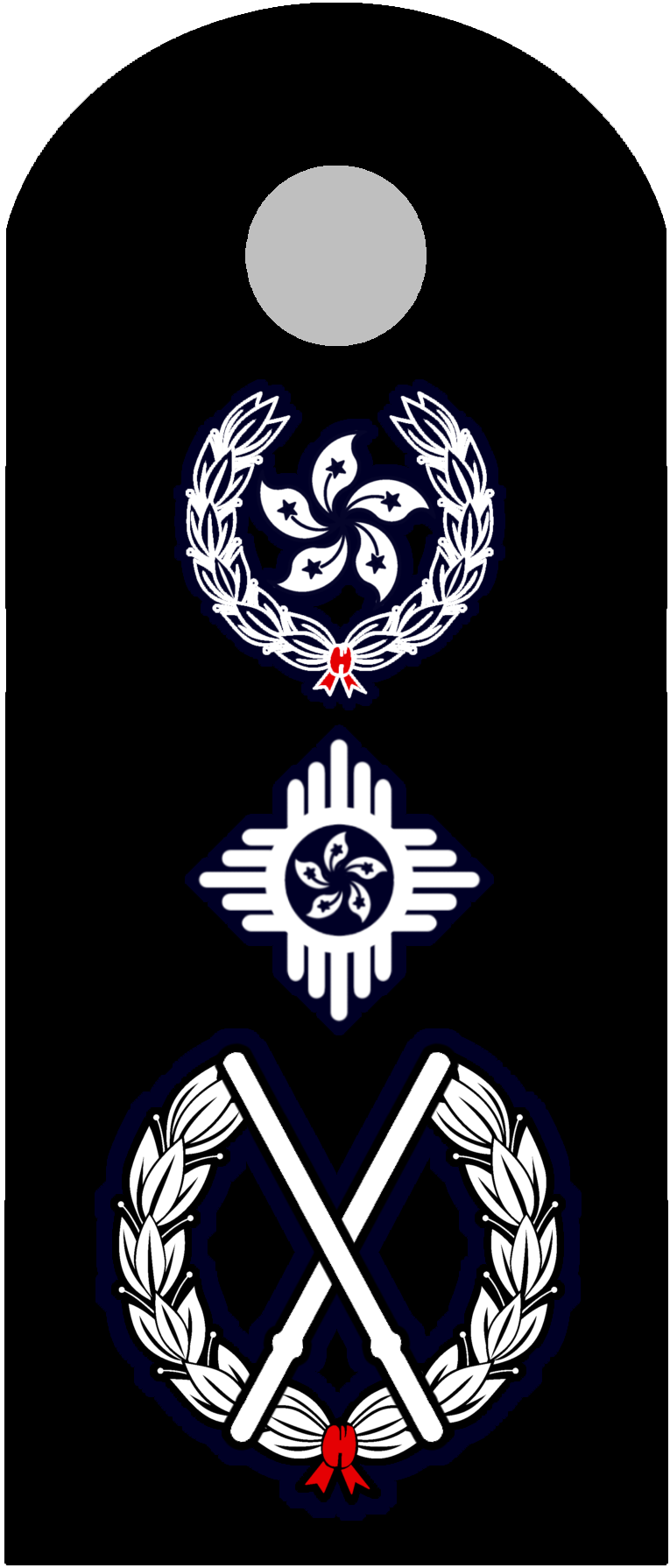
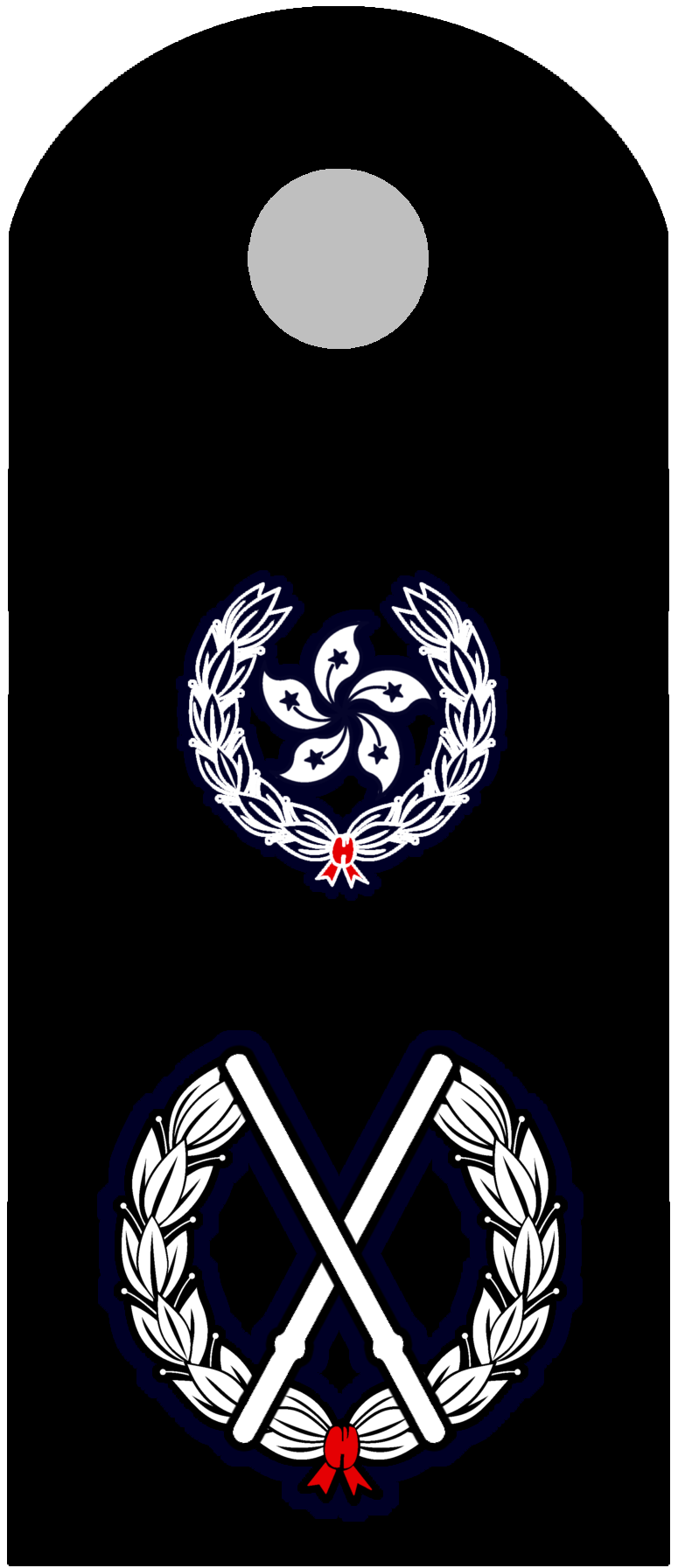
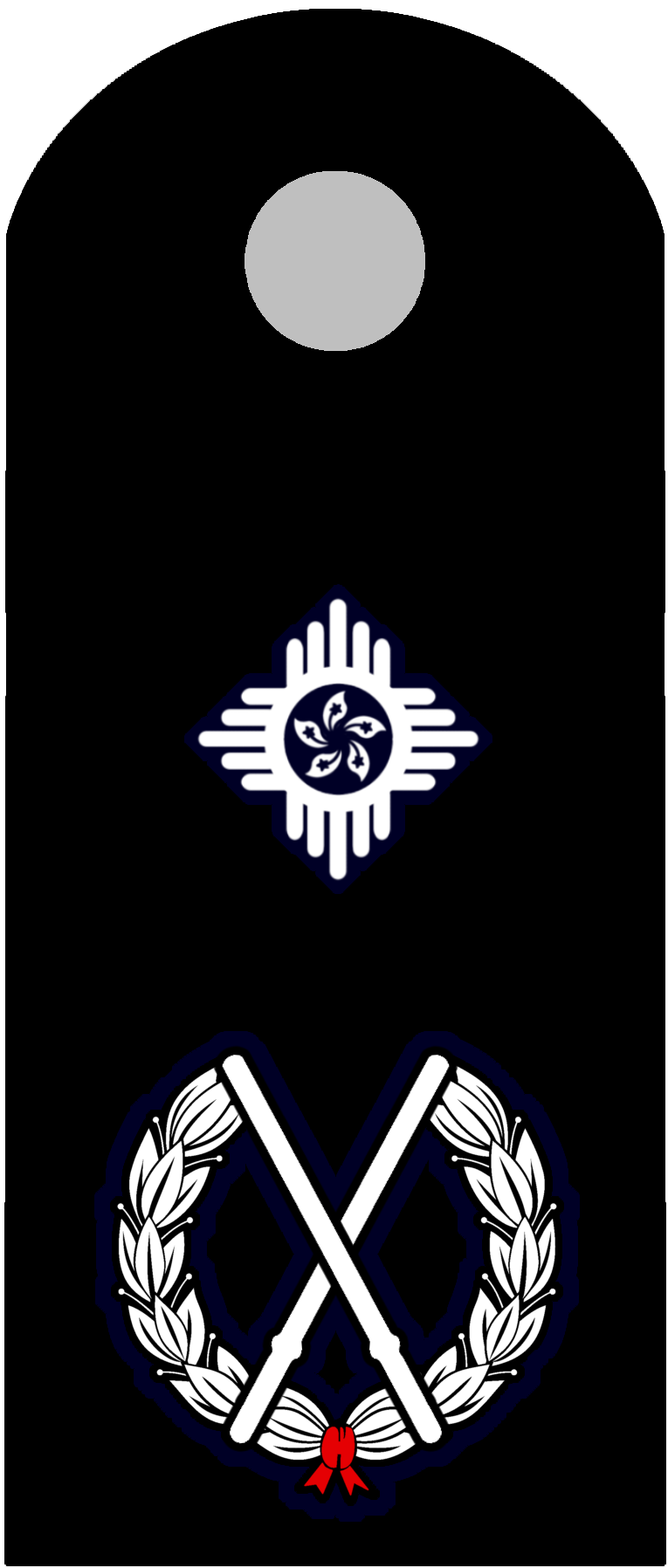
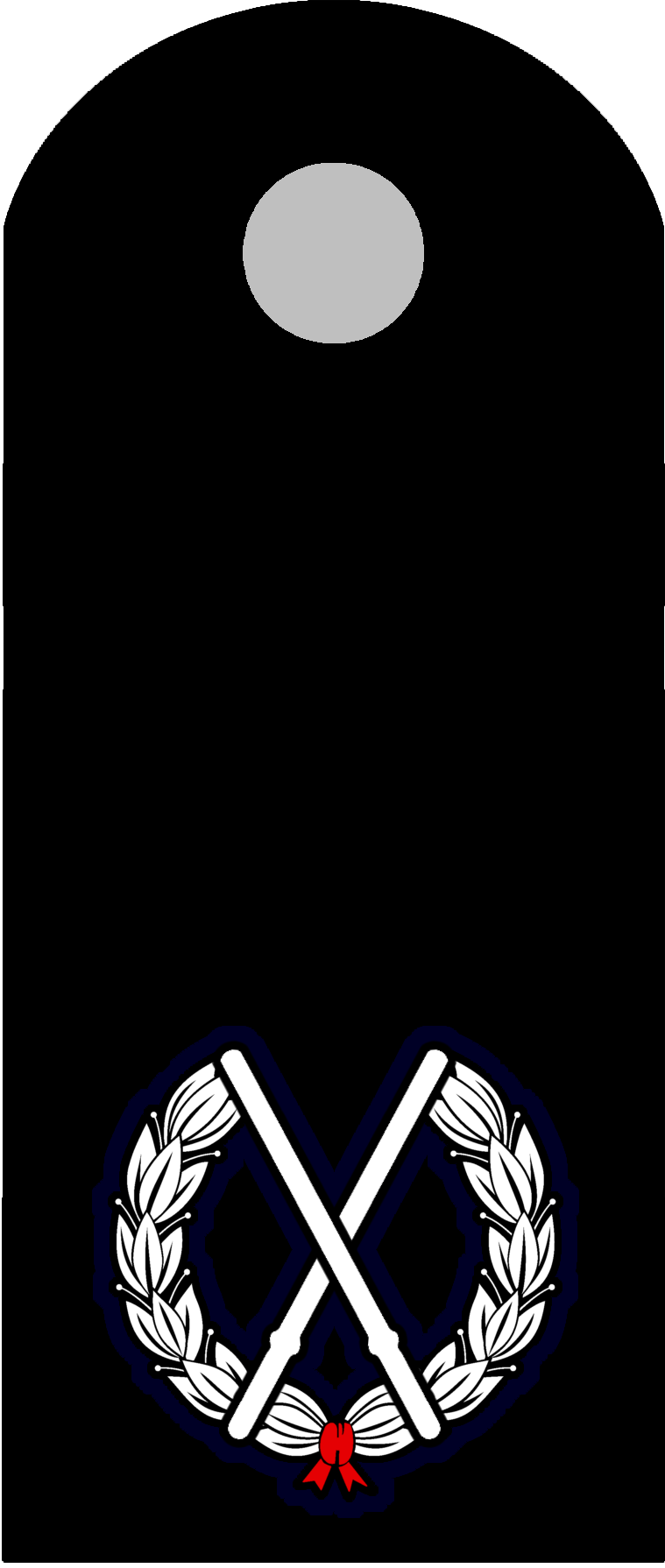
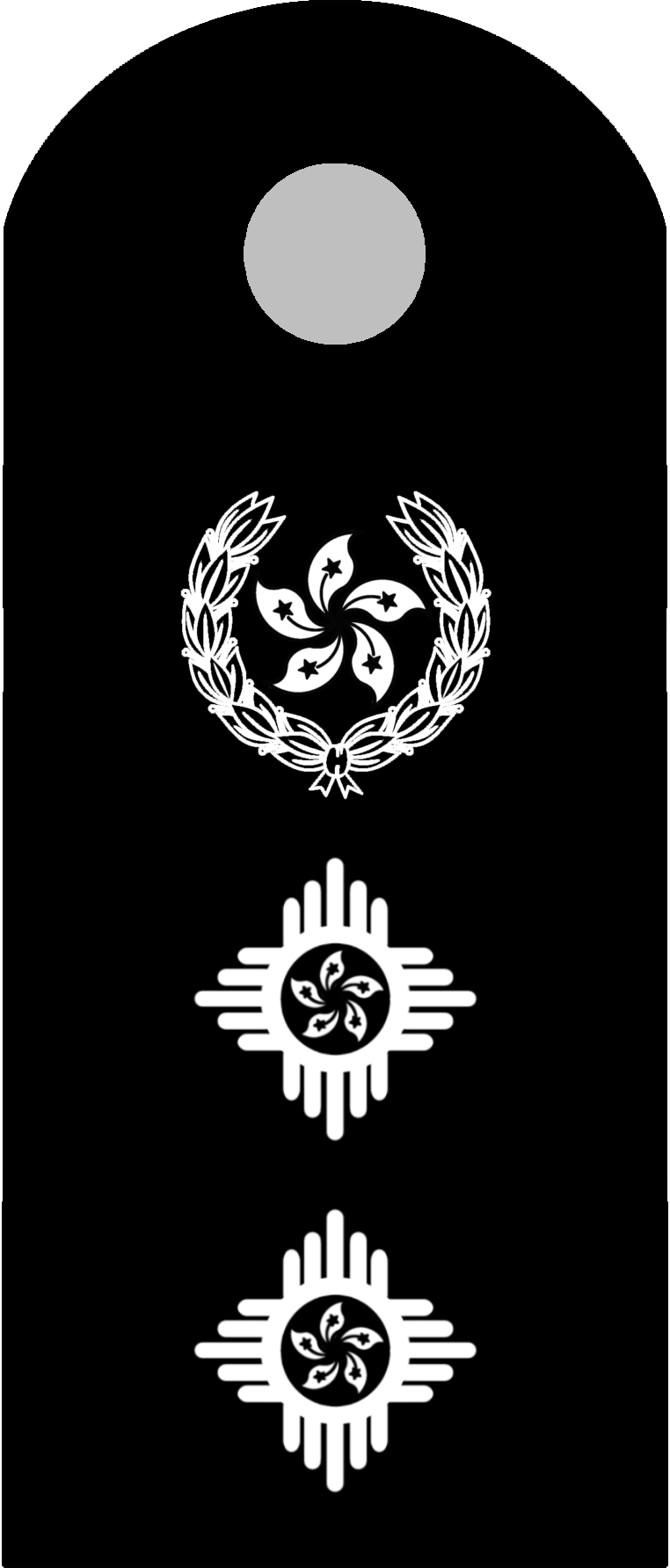
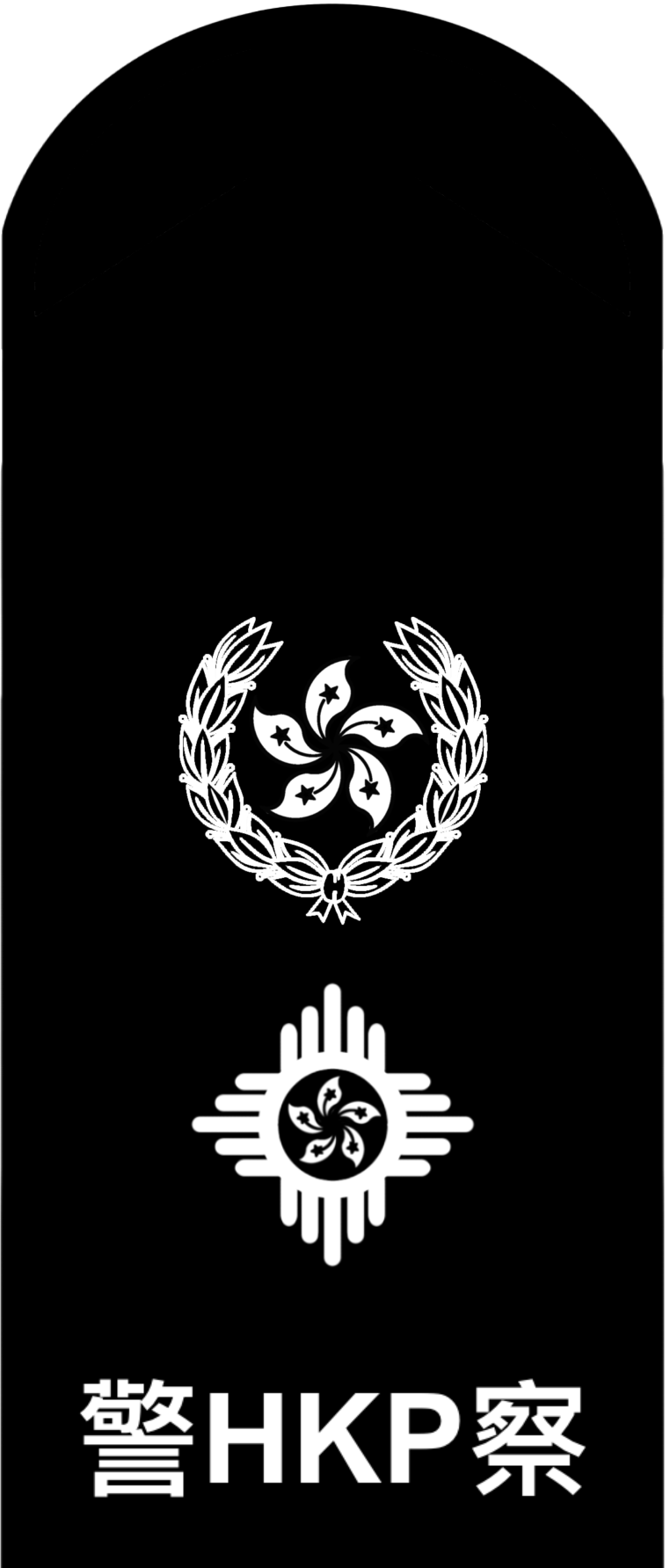
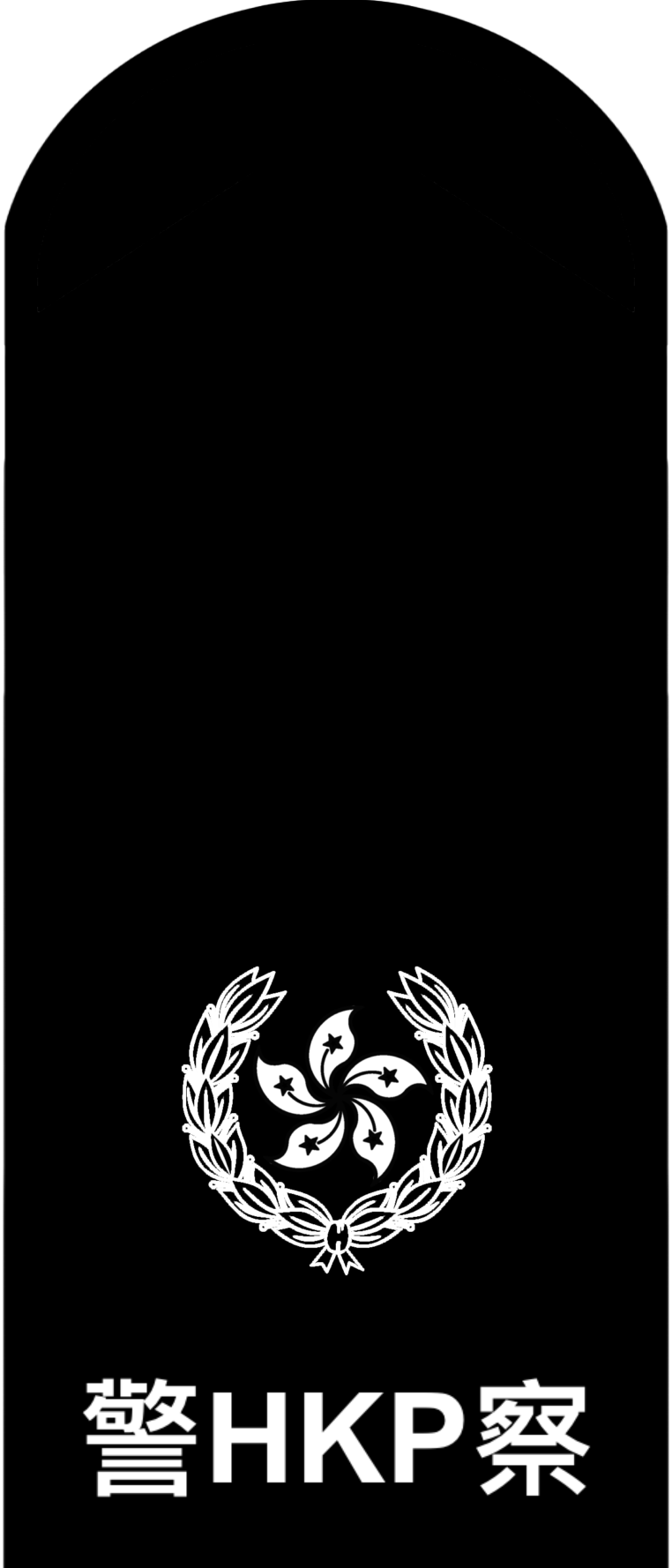
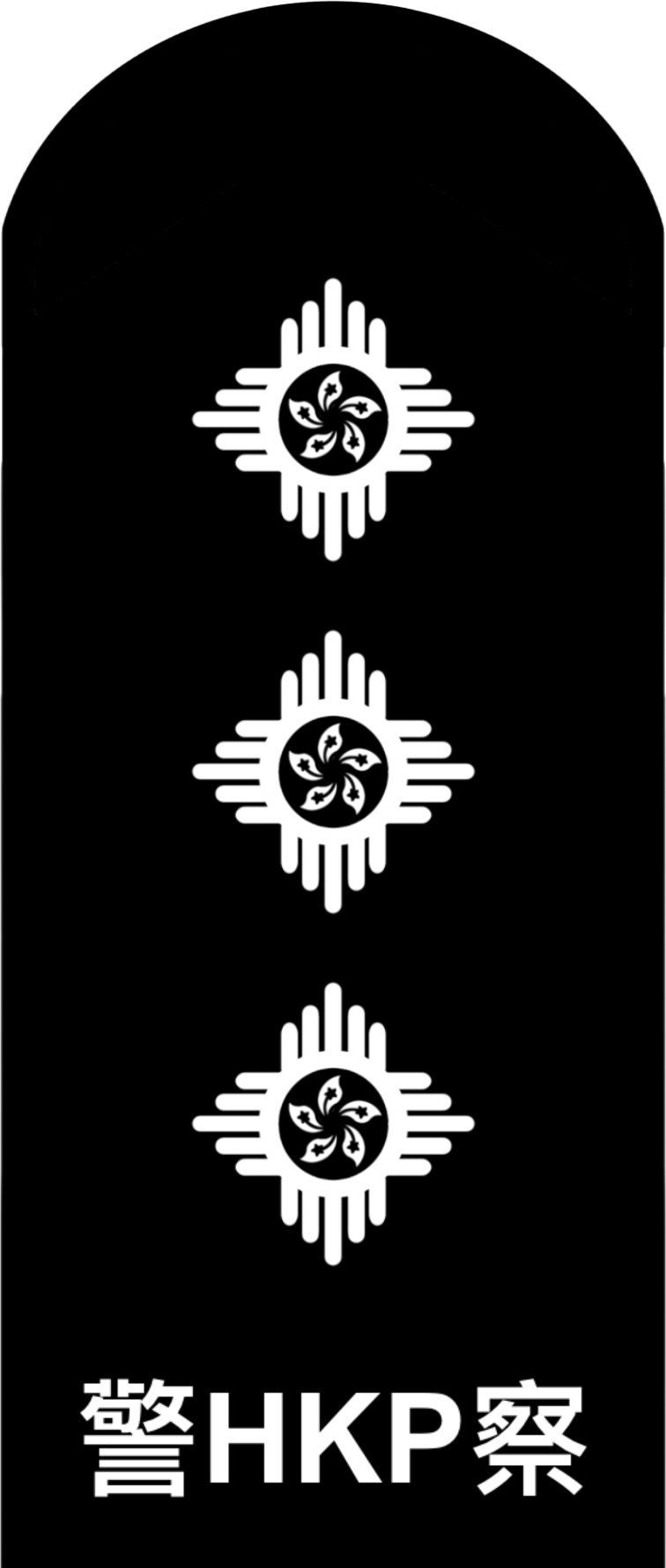
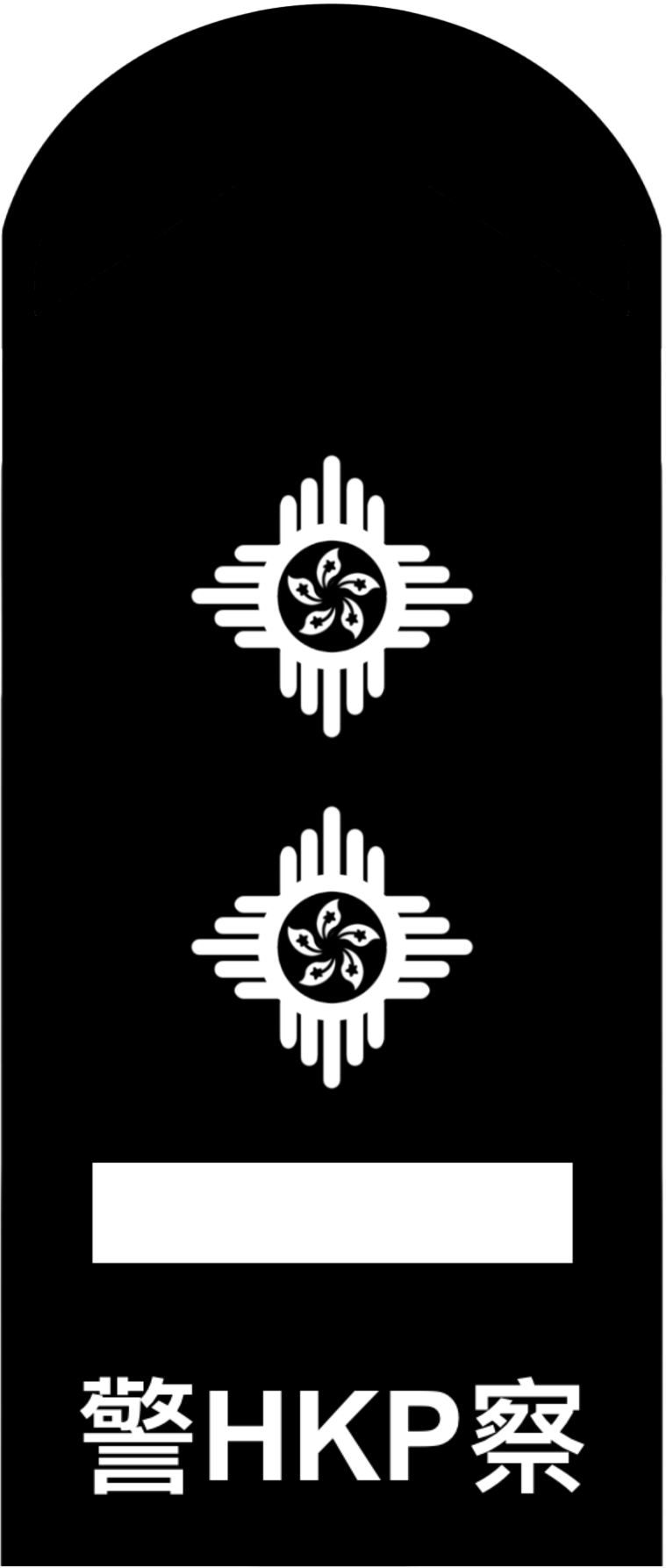
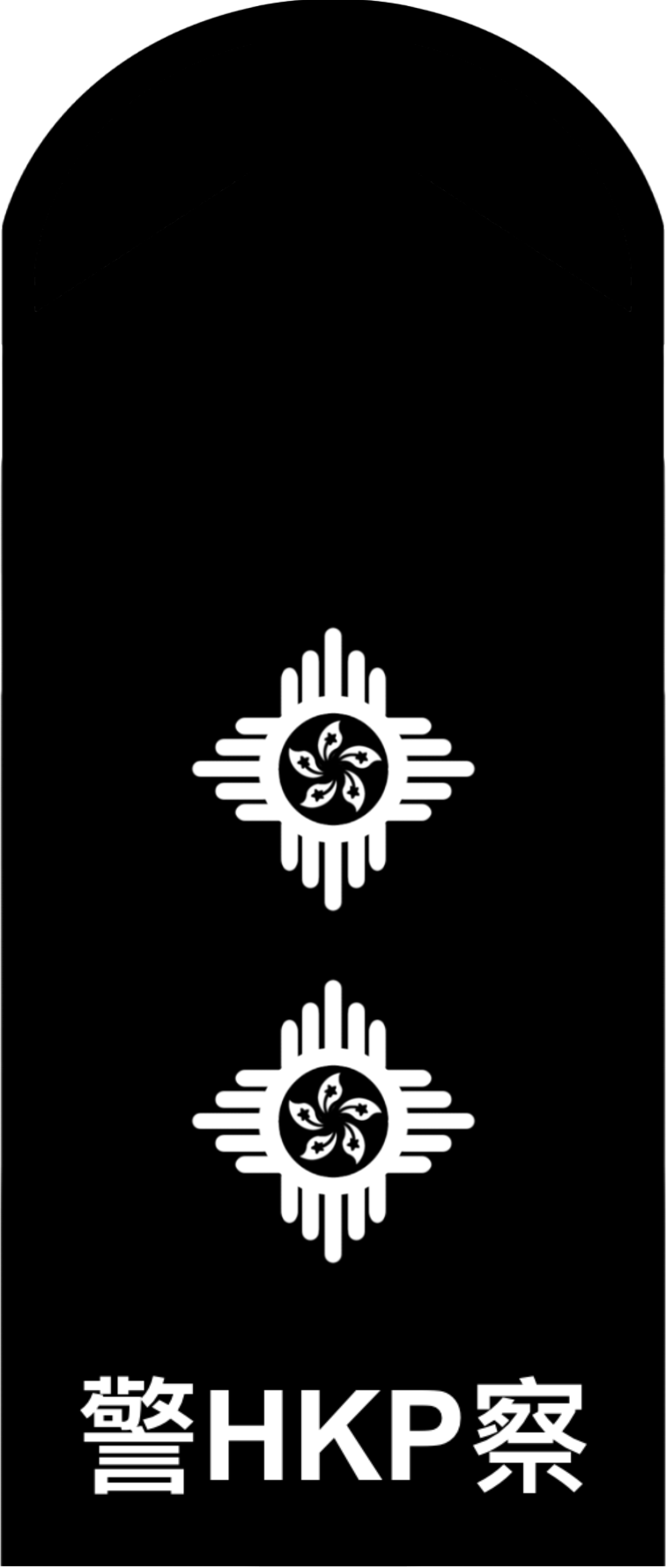
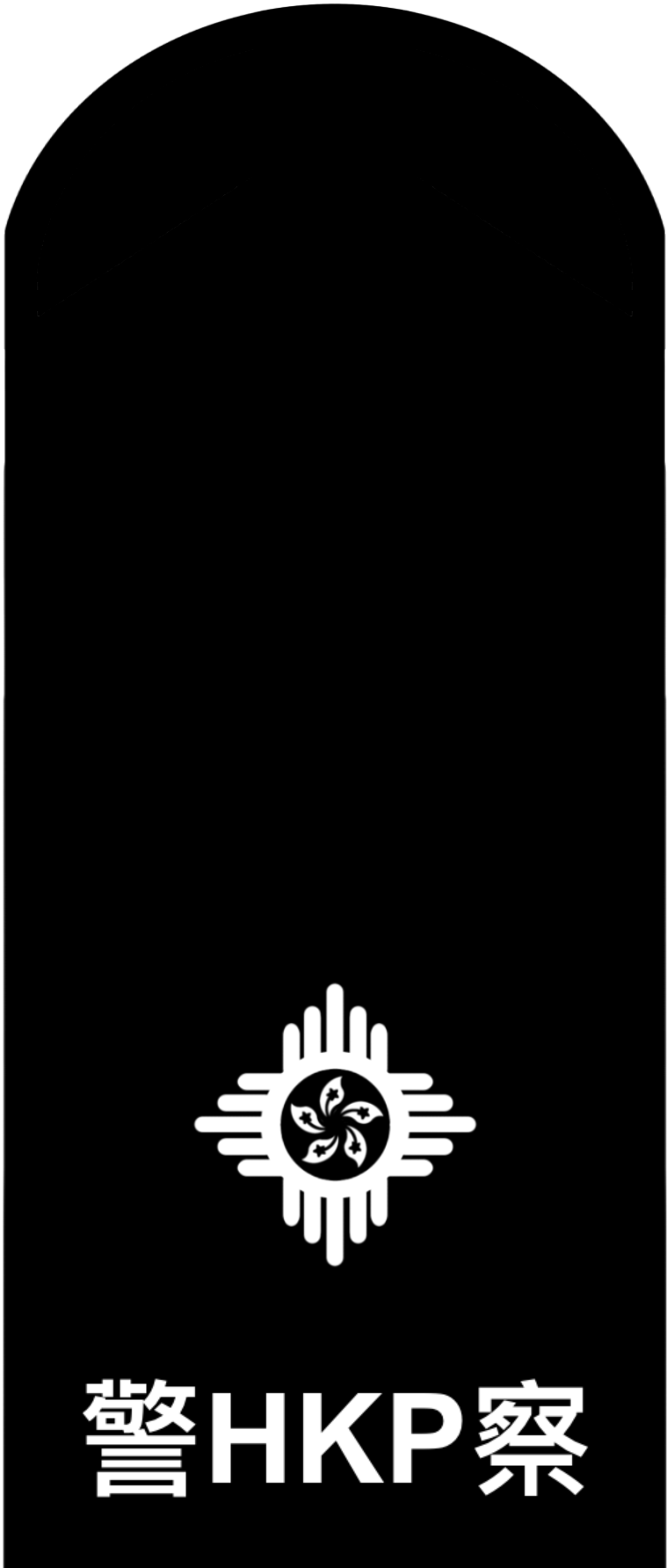
Rank group	Gazetted							Inspectorate
Hong Kong Police Force
Hong Kong Police Force	警務處處長	警務處副處長	警務處高級助理處長	警務處助理處長	總警司	高級警司	警司	總督察	高級督察	督察	見習督察
Hong Kong Police Force	Commissioner of Police	Deputy commissioner	Senior assistant commissioner	Assistant commissioner	Chief superintendent	Senior superintendent	Superintendent	Chief inspector	Senior inspector	Inspector	Probationary inspector

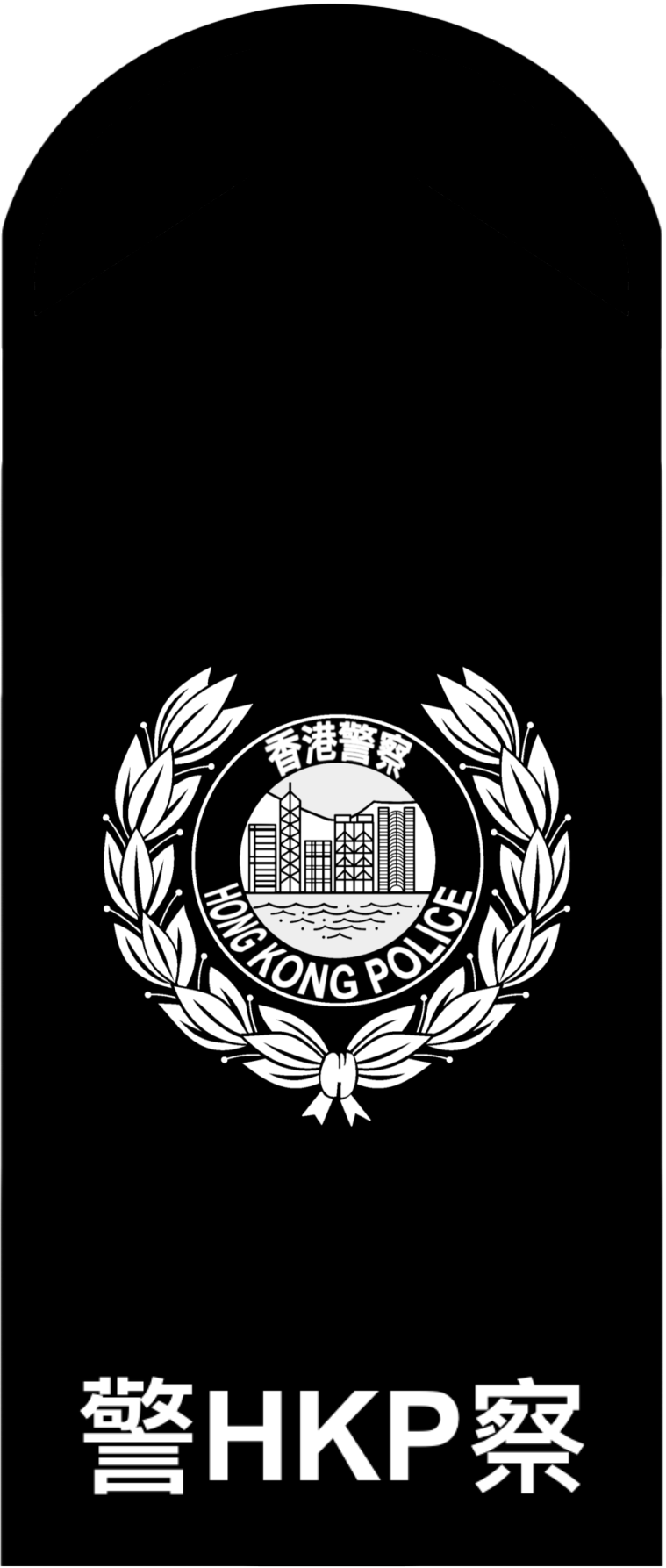
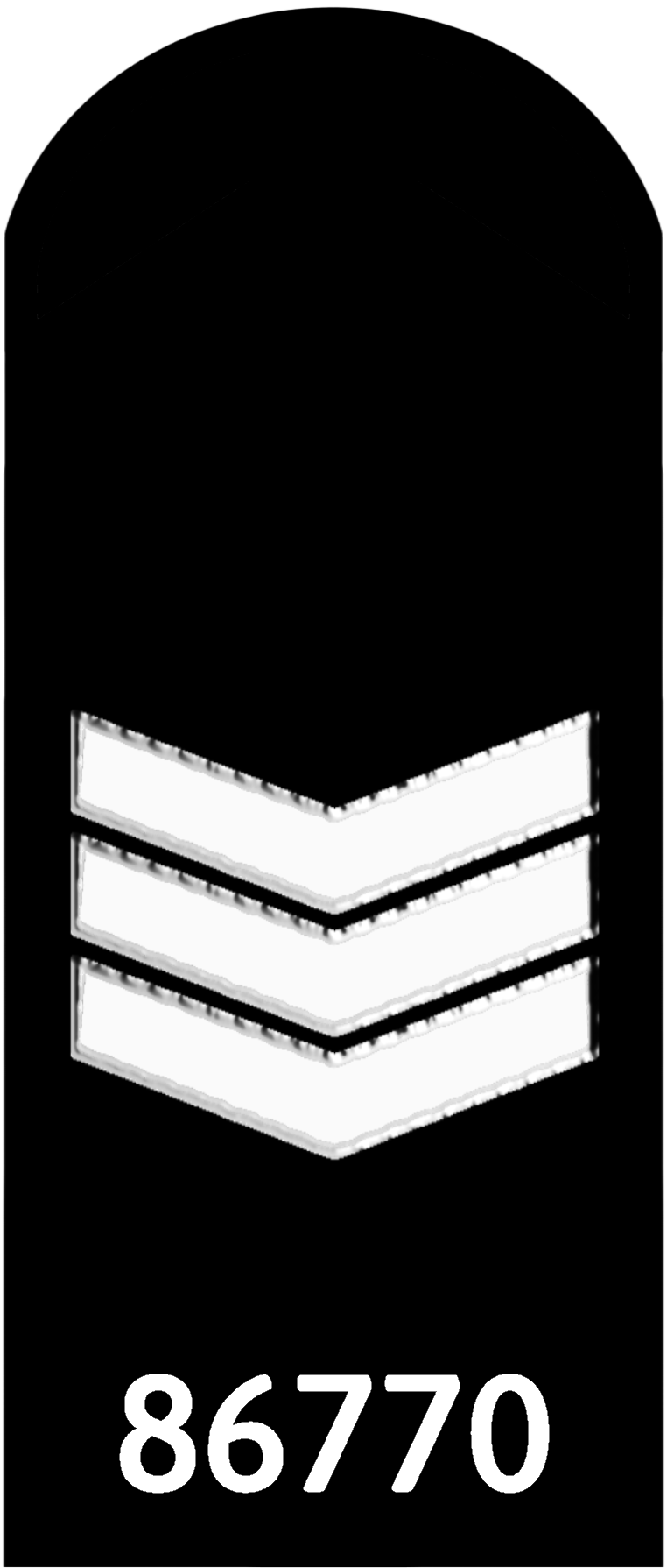
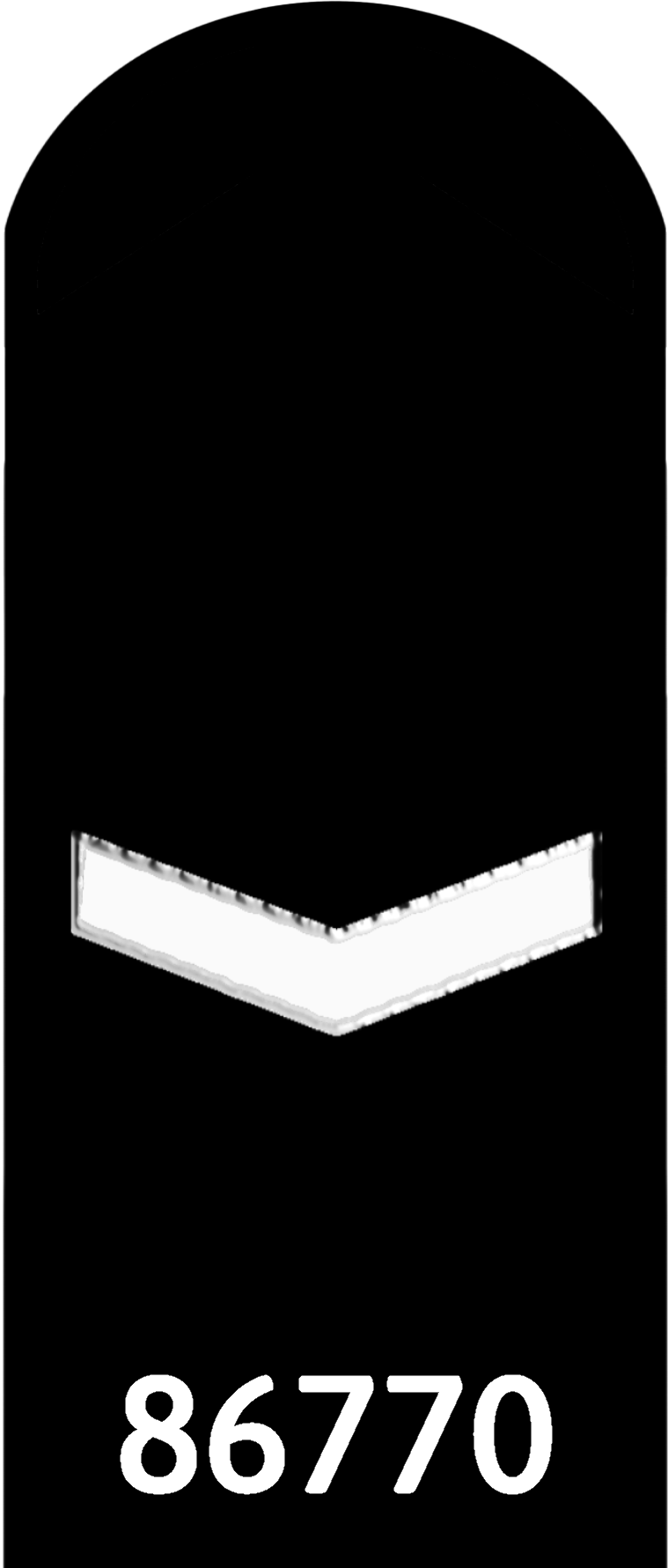
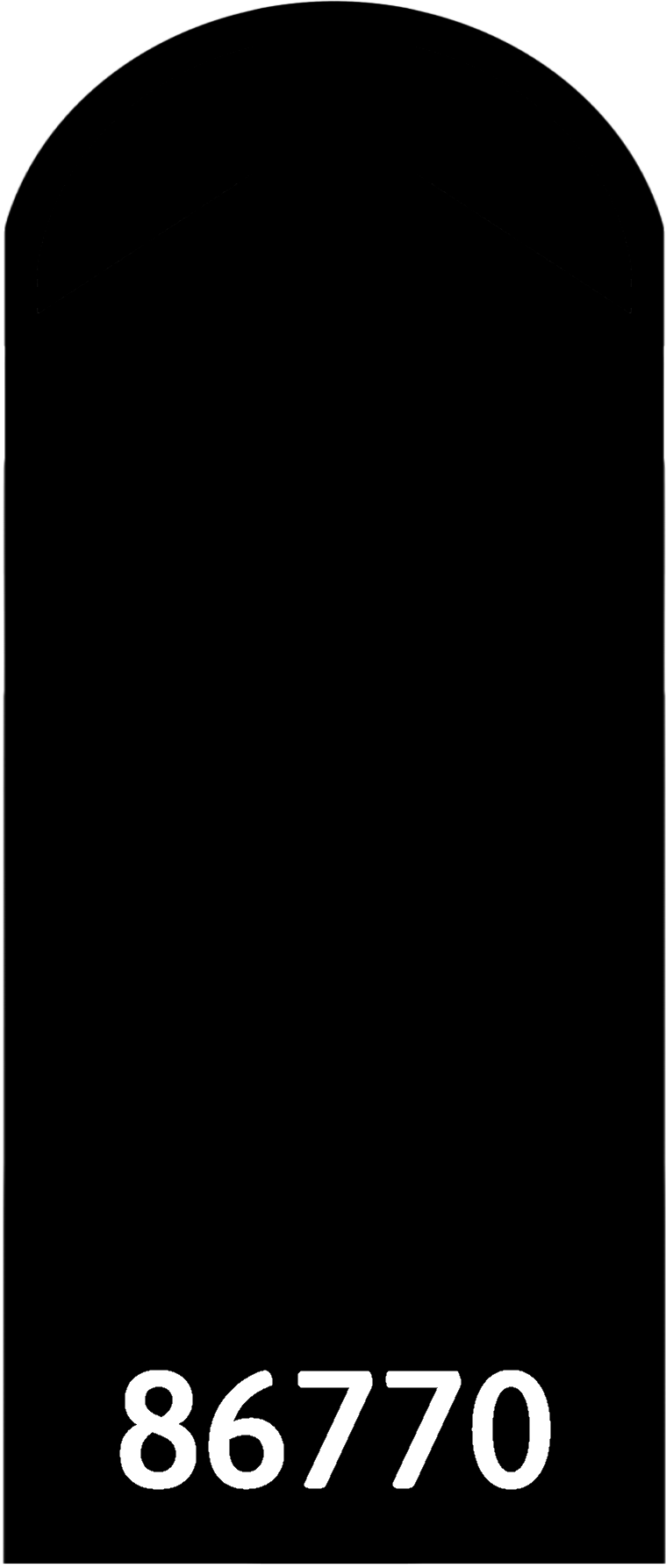
Rank group	Non-commissioned officer		Rank and file
Hong Kong Police Force
Hong Kong Police Force	警署警長	警長	高級警員	警員
Hong Kong Police Force	Station sergeant	Sergeant	Senior police constable	Police constable

== India ==
=== State/union territory police forces ===
The Indian police hierarchy is structured into three distinct categories: the Indian Police Service (IPS), State Police Service (SPS), and State Police Subordinate Service. Both the IPS and SPS are classified under the gazetted officer category, while the State Police Subordinate service falls under the non-gazetted category. Service forces respectively.

Indian Police Service cadre officers rank insignia
Insignia
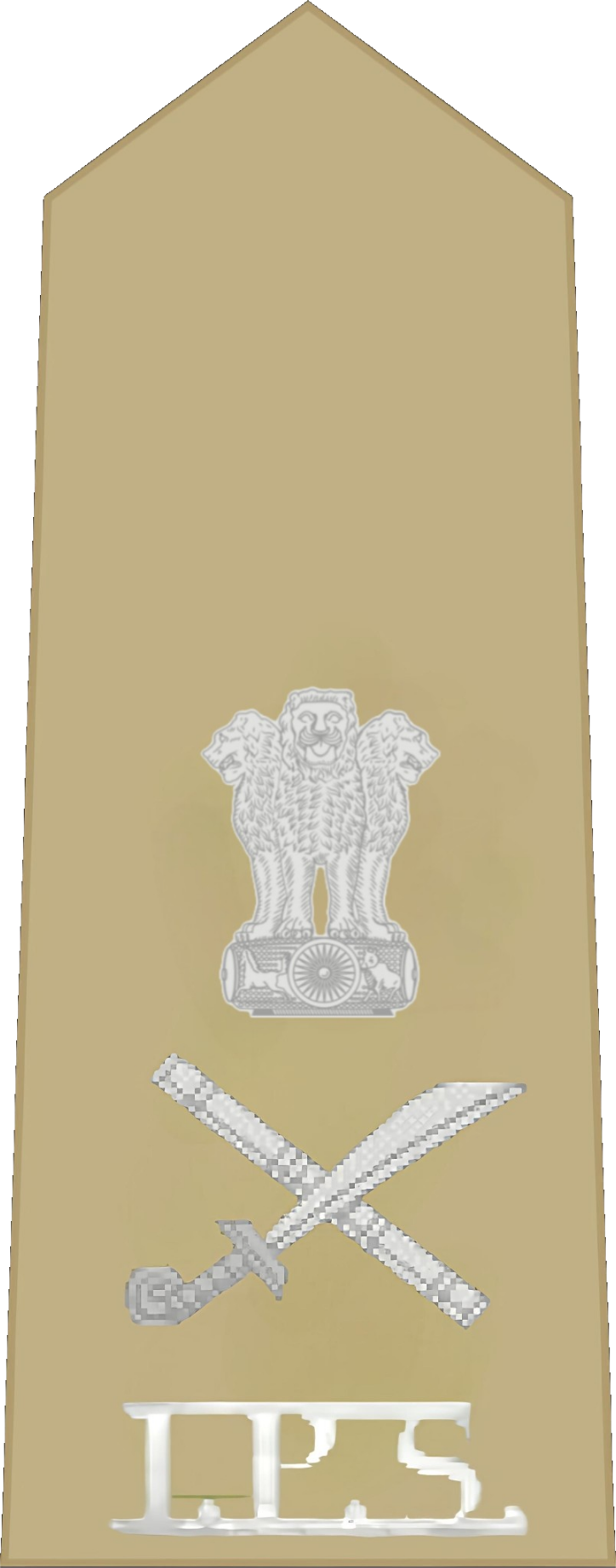
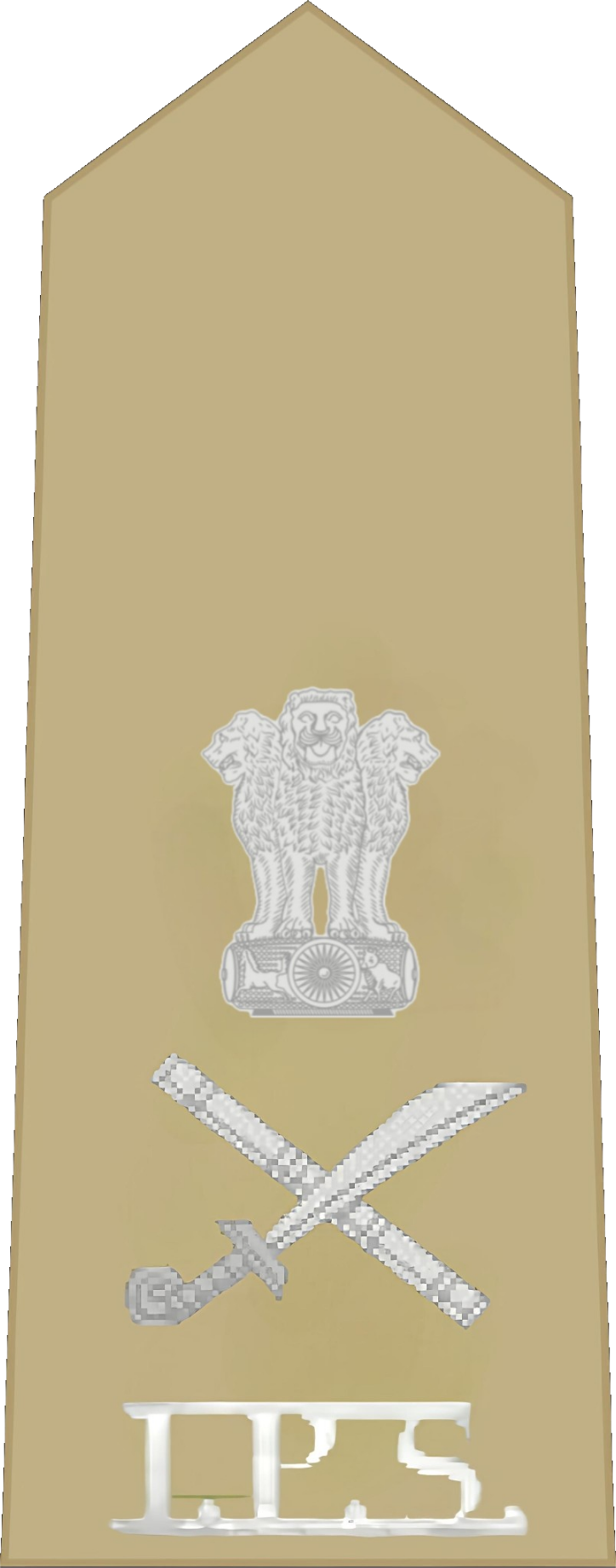
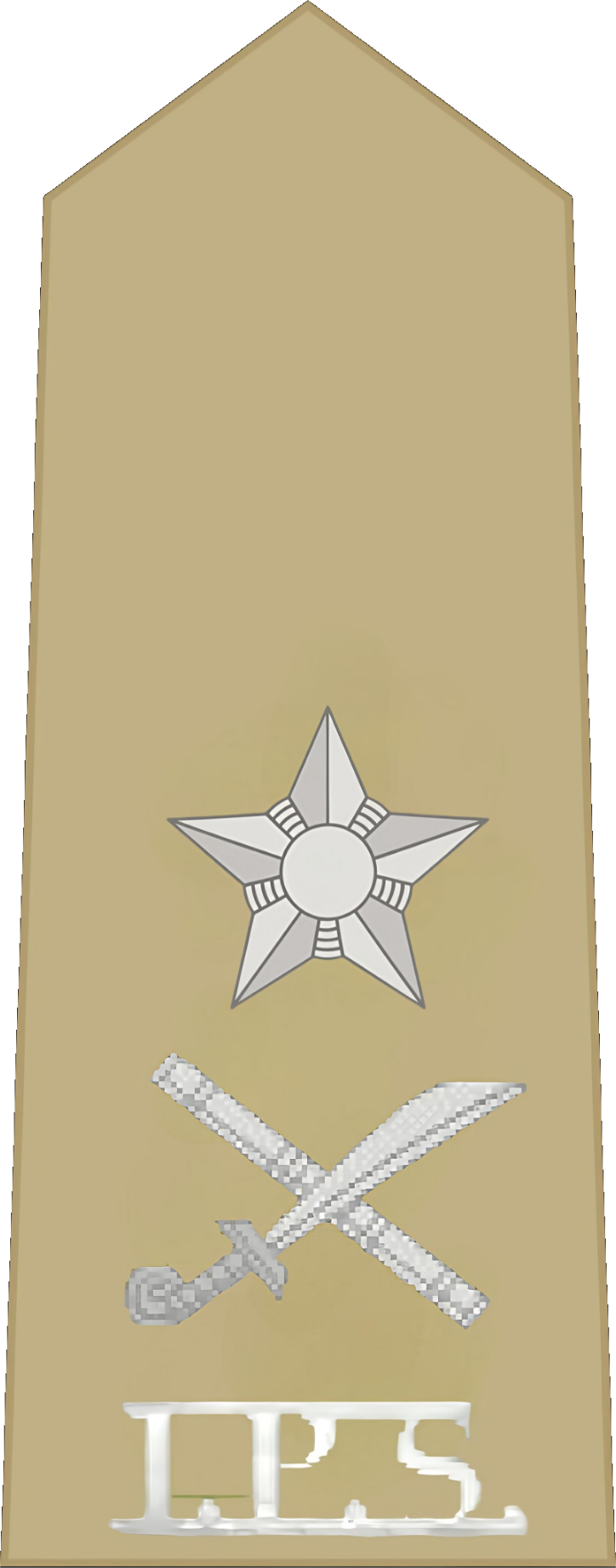
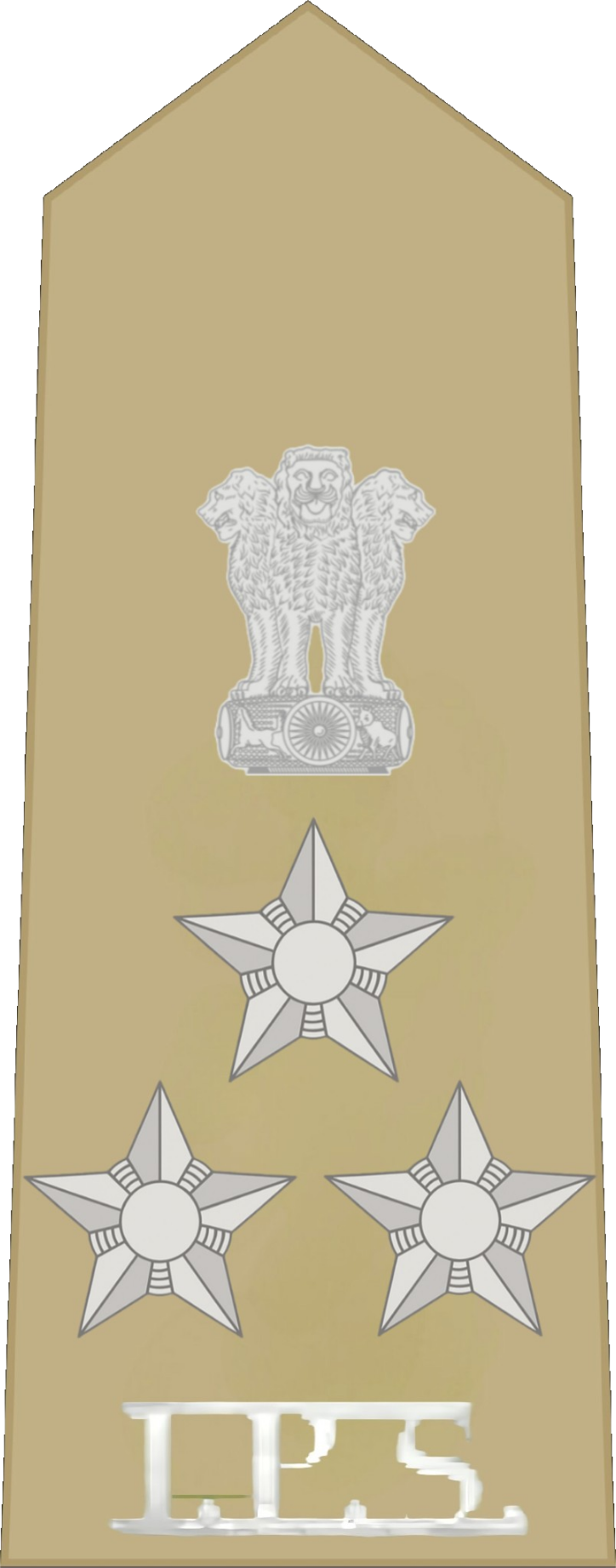
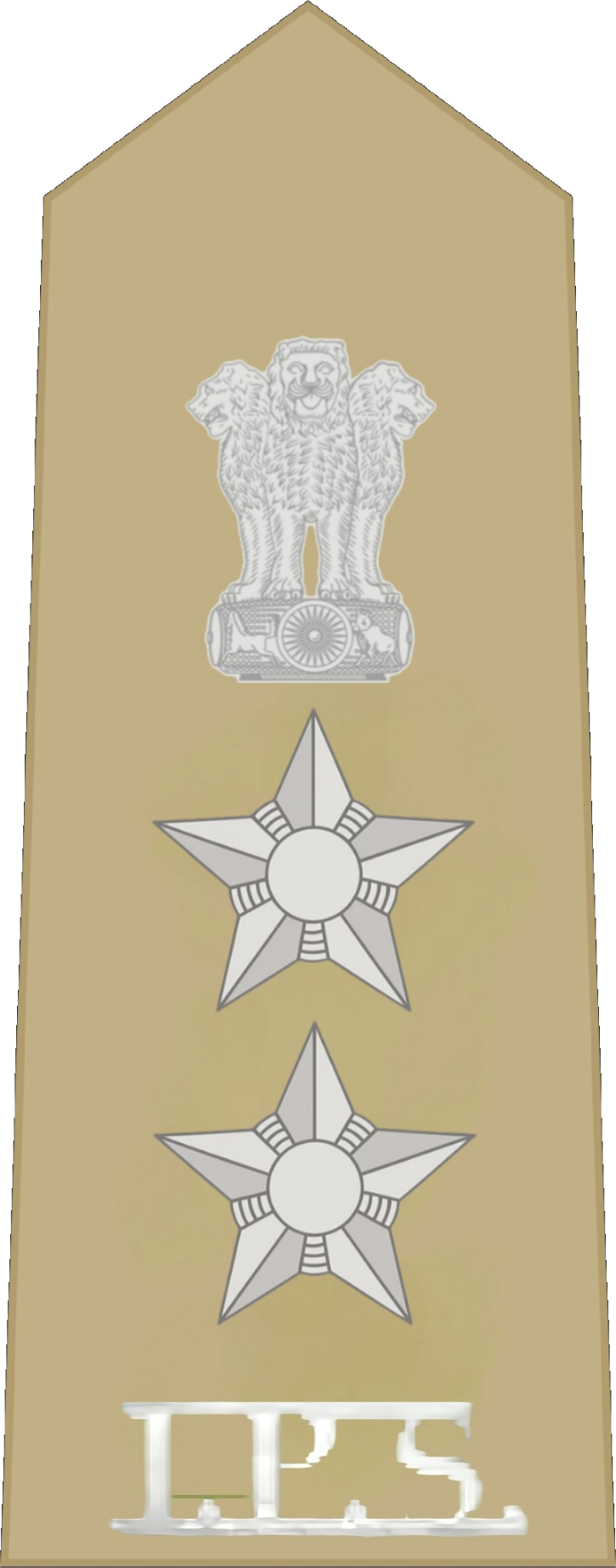
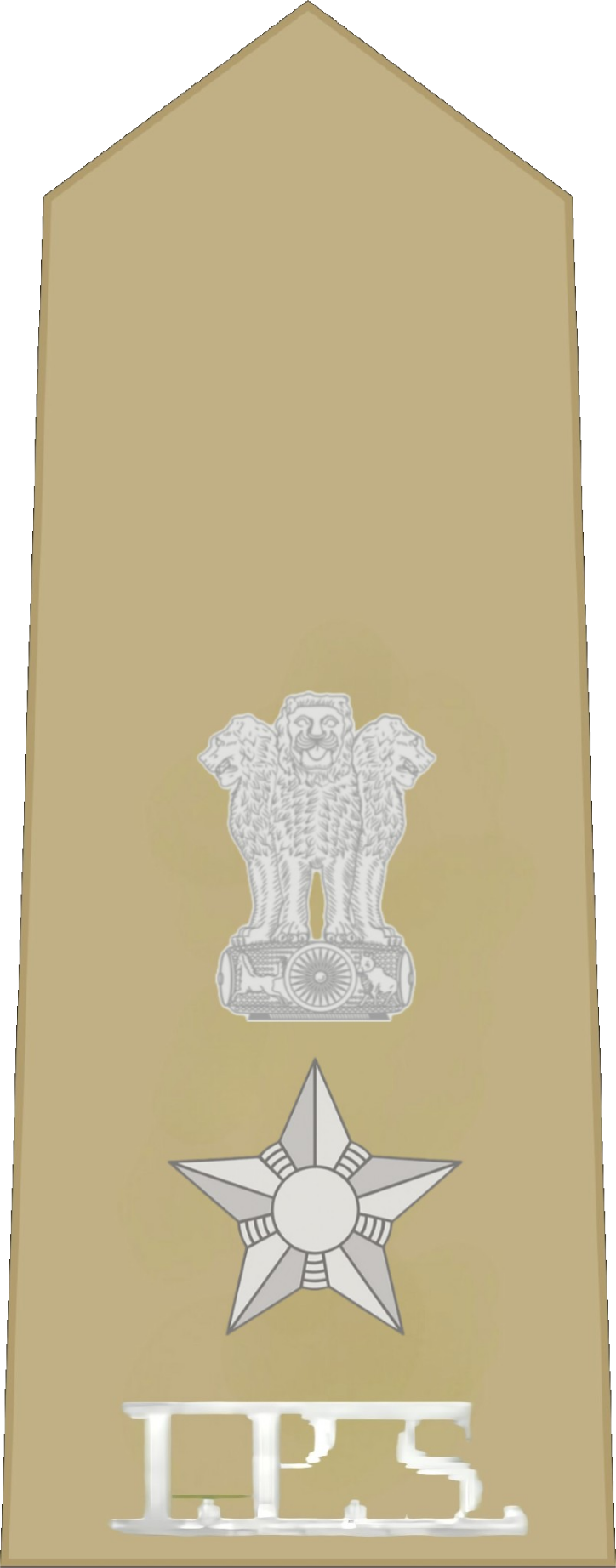
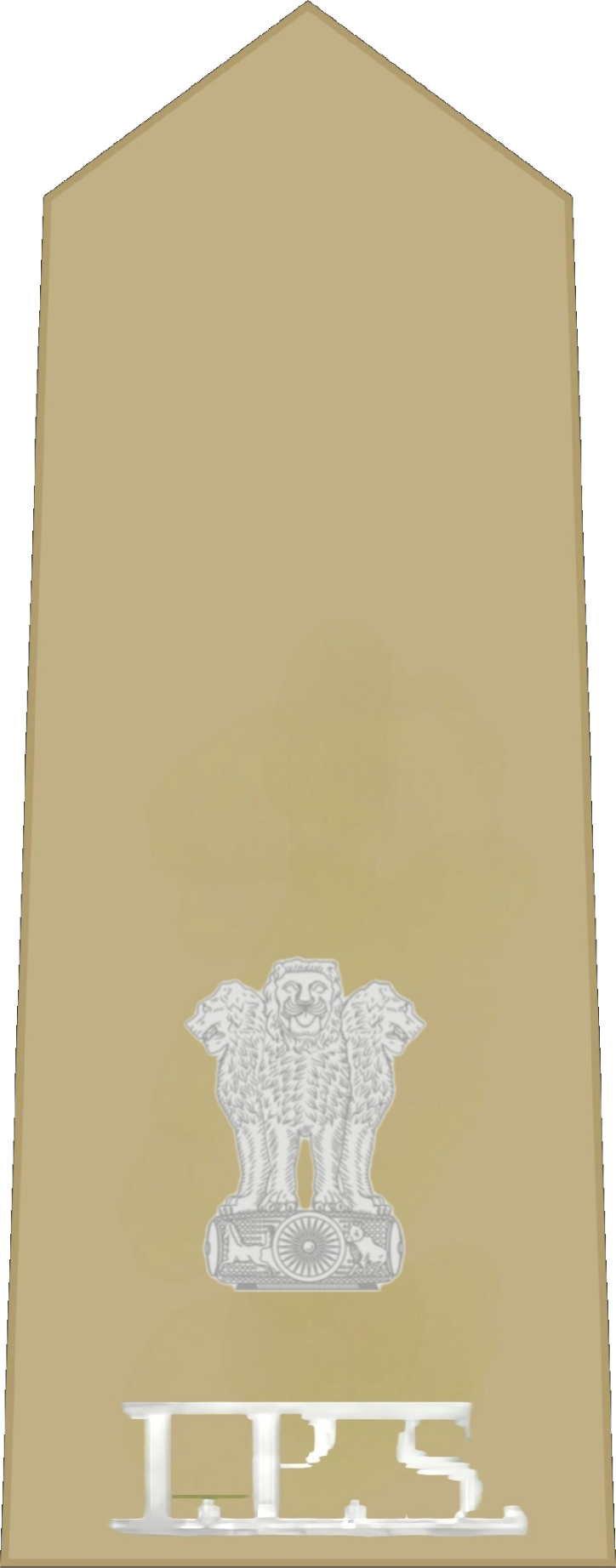
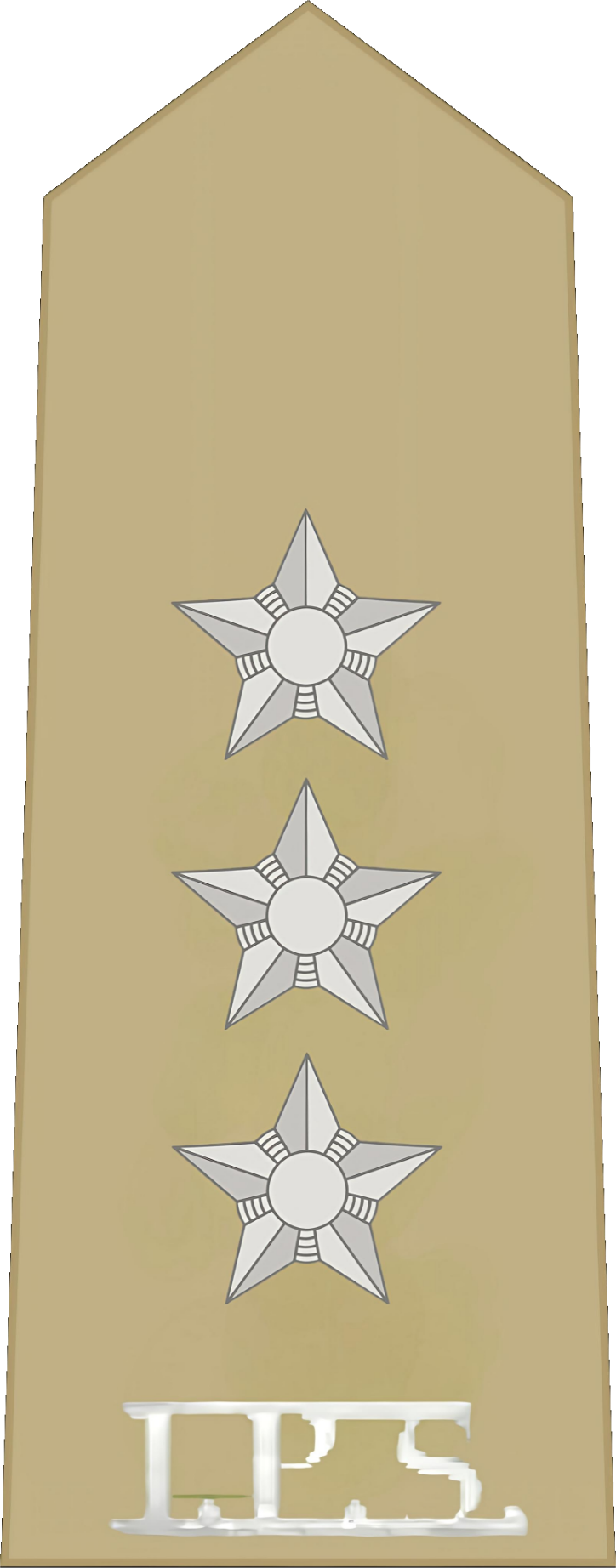
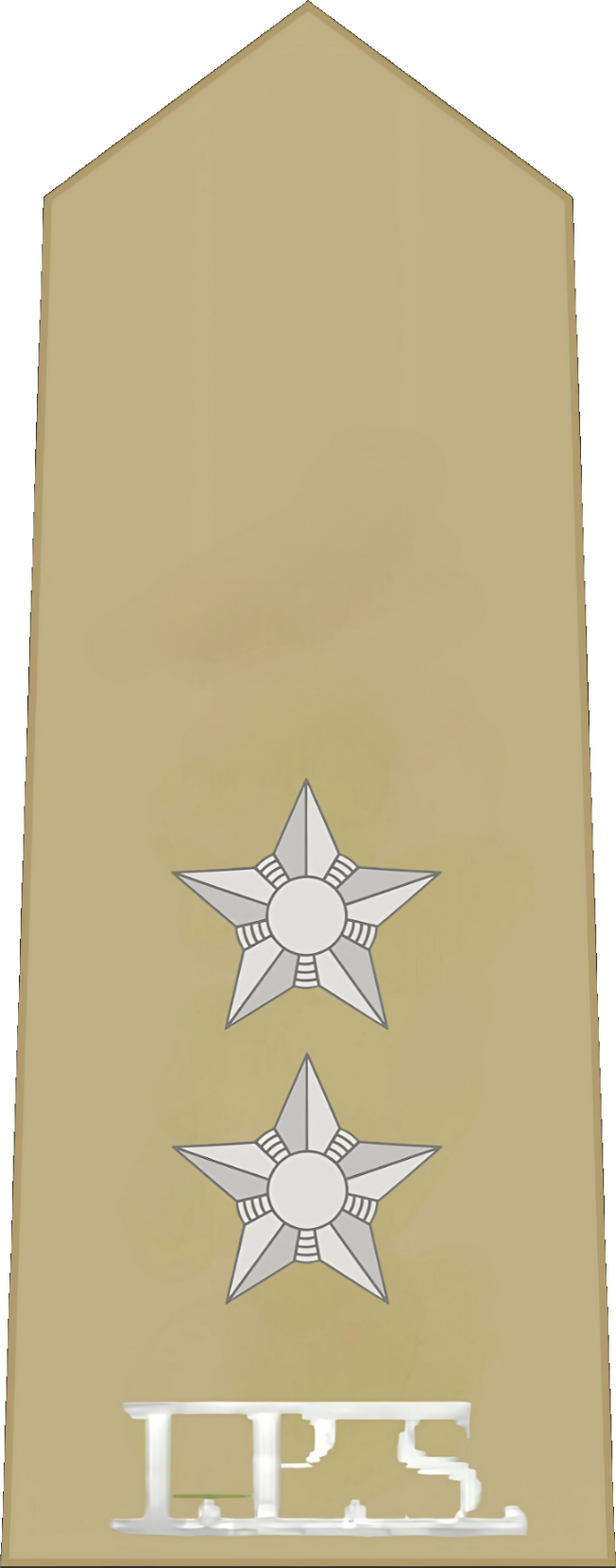
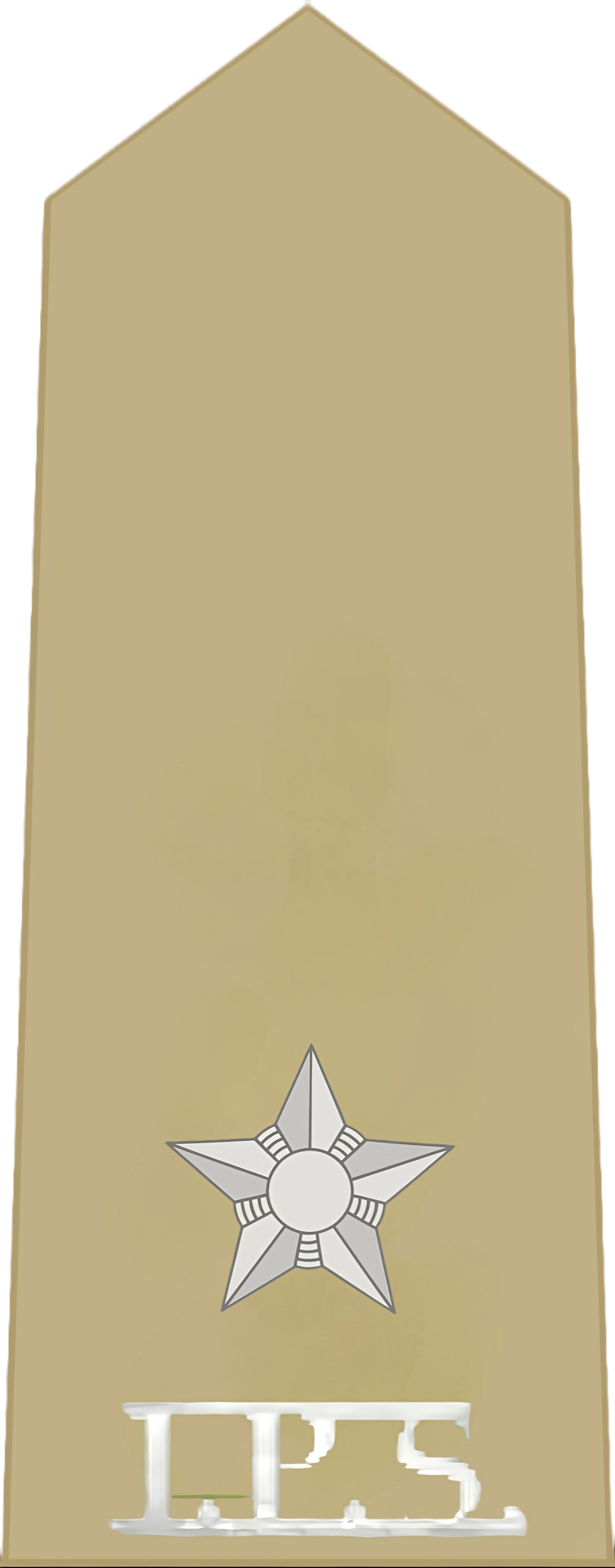
Rank
Director General of Police
Additional Director General of Police (Note: Rank insignia of DGP is similar to Additional DGP.)
Inspector General of Police
Deputy Inspector General of Police
Superintendent of Police (Selection Grade) (Note: The Senior Superintendent of Police (SSP) is a post, not a rank, typically held by an SP (selection grade or junior grade) in states like Uttar Pradesh, Jammu and Kashmir, and Punjab.)
Superintendent of Police
Additional superintendent of police
Assistant Superintendent of Police
Assistant superintendent of police (Probationary for two years)
Assistant Superintendent of Police (Probationary for one year)
Abbreviation
DGP
ADGP
IGP
DIGP
SP (SG)
SP
Addl.SP
ASP
ASP
ASP

- Note 1: The rank insignia of DGP, Spl.DGP, Addl.DGP is the same.
- Note 2: The equivalent rank to the ASP (Asst.SP) in State Police Services is the deputy superintendent of police (DSP/DySP).
- Note 3: The commissioner of police is a post typically held by DIG and above rank officers.

State Police Services rank insignia
Insignia

Rank

Superintendent of police (Note: In an armed police battalion, the equivalent rank is "Commandant.)
Additional superintendent of police (Note: In an armed police battalion, the equivalent rank is Deputy Commandant)
Deputy superintendent of police (Note: In an armed police battalion, the equivalent rank is Assistant Commandant.)

Abbreviation

SP
Addl.SP
DSP/Dy.SP

- Note: Gazetted officers in State Police Services (SPS) begins from DSP and above.
- In the Indian Police Service (IPS), rank starts from Assistant Superintendent of Police (ASP), which is equivalent to DSP in state services.

Indian Police non-gazetted officers rank insignia
Insignia
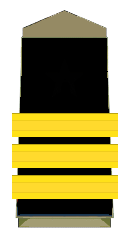
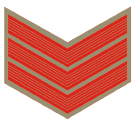
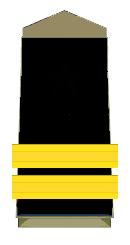
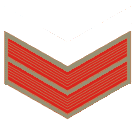
No insignia
Rank
Inspector of Police
Inspector / Circle Inspector (Note: Inspector or Circle Inspector with One Five-Pointed Star insignia exists in West Bengal Police.)
Assistant Police Inspector (Note: This rank exists only in the Maharashtra Police.)
Sub-Inspector
Sergeant (Kolkata Police)
Assistant Sub-Inspector
Head Constable (Note: Shoulder insignia rank only used in the Maharashtra Police.)
Senior Constable (Note: This rank is also known as senior constable, constable grade-I, and exists only in some state police forces.)
Police constable
Abbreviation
INSP
INSP / CO
API
SI
Sgt
ASI
HC
SC
PC

- The rank of Sergeant is used in India only in the Bihar Police and the Kolkata Police
- The One Five Pointed Star for the rank of Inspector is used by Police forces of 7 states viz. West Bengal, Jharkhand, Bihar, Sikkim, Assam, Nagaland and Tripura. This is because Inspectors of Police in these 7 states are Gazetted Officers. However, the Kolkata Police uses the Four Pointed Star of the Order of Bath for the ranks of Inspector and Assistant Commissioner of Police instead of Five Pointed Star. For the ranks of ASI, SI/Sergeant and Deputy Commissioner of Police, the usual Five Pointed Star is used
- Colour pattern and size of chevrons may vary according to the different rules of several distinct Indian State Police services.

=== Central Armed Police Forces (CAPFs) ===
Central Armed Police Forces include the BSF, ITBP, SSB, CRPF, CISF, NSG, and AR. They function under the Ministry of Home Affairs, government of India.

Officers

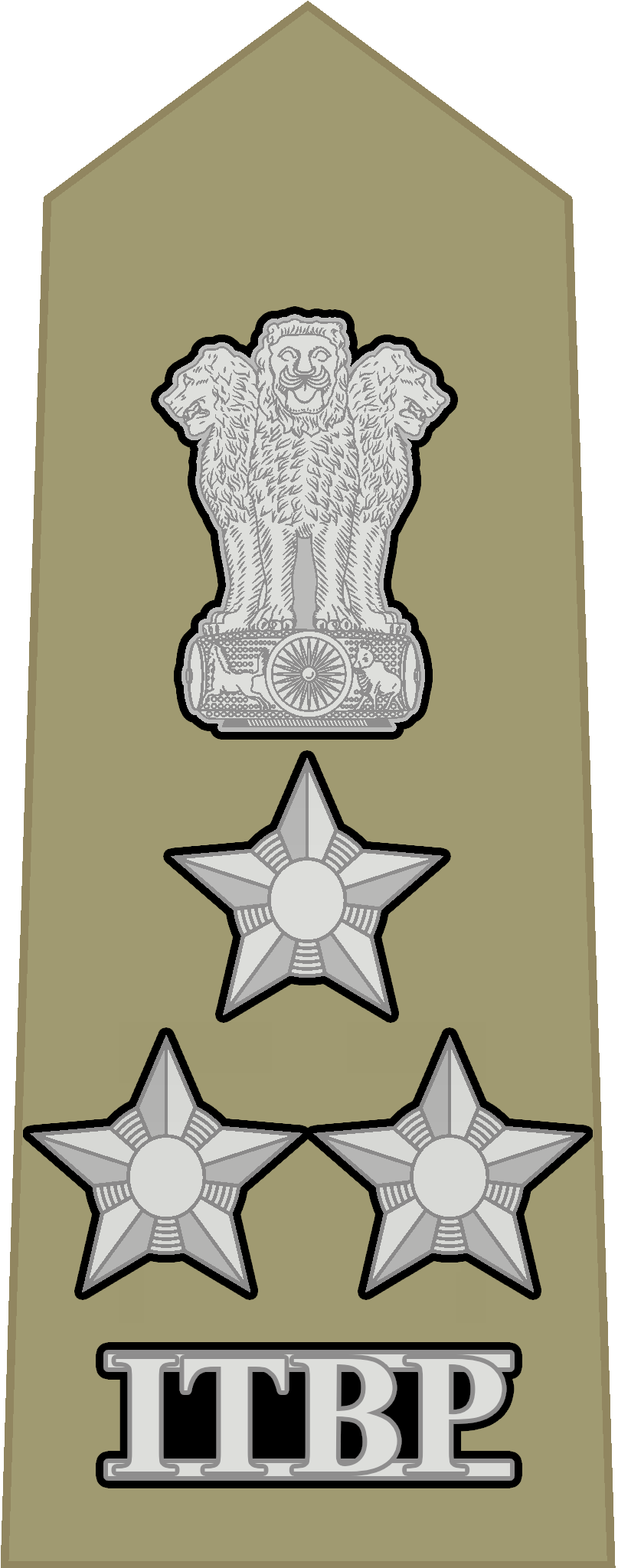
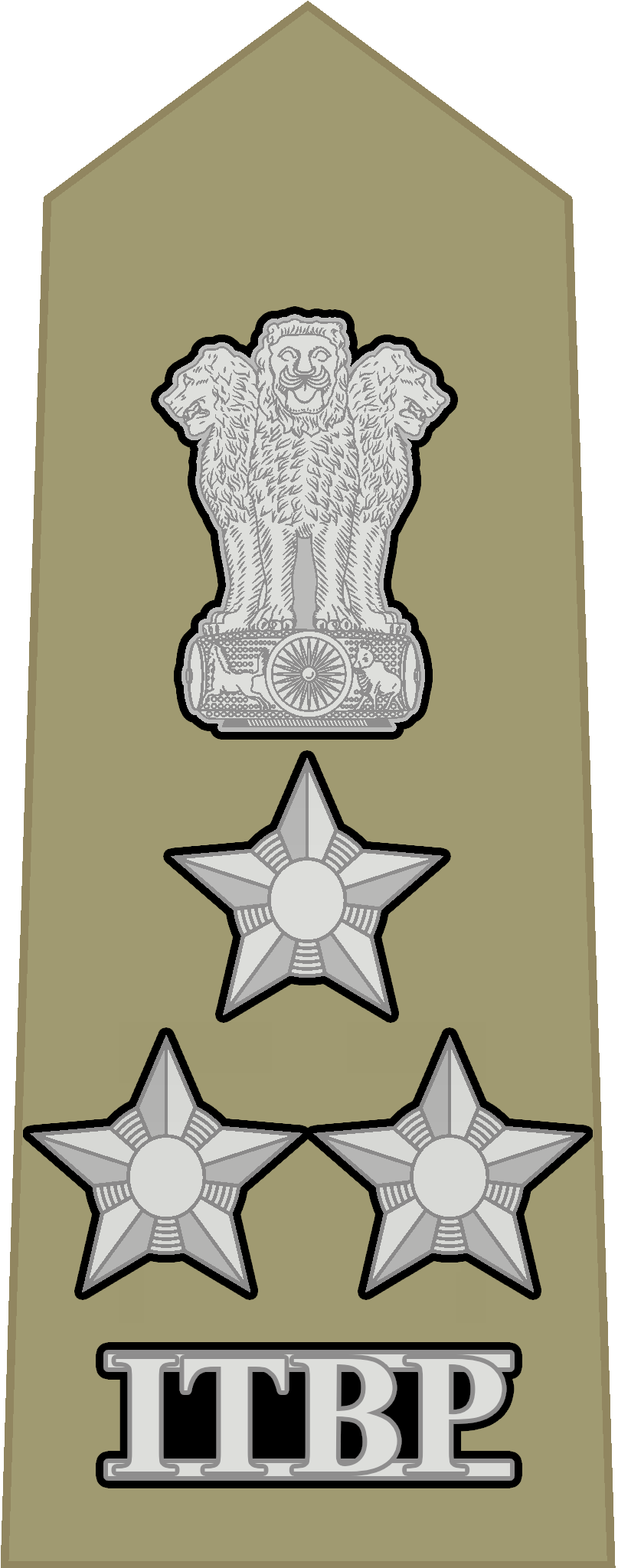
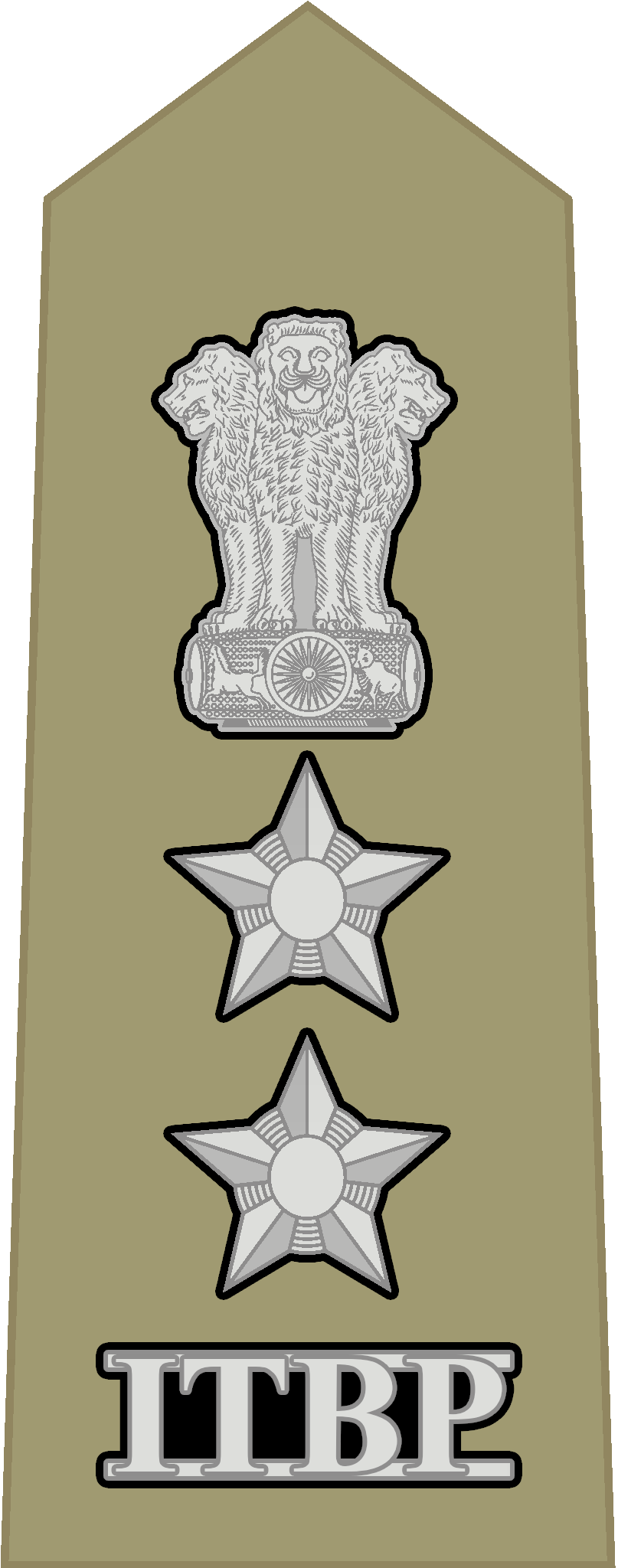
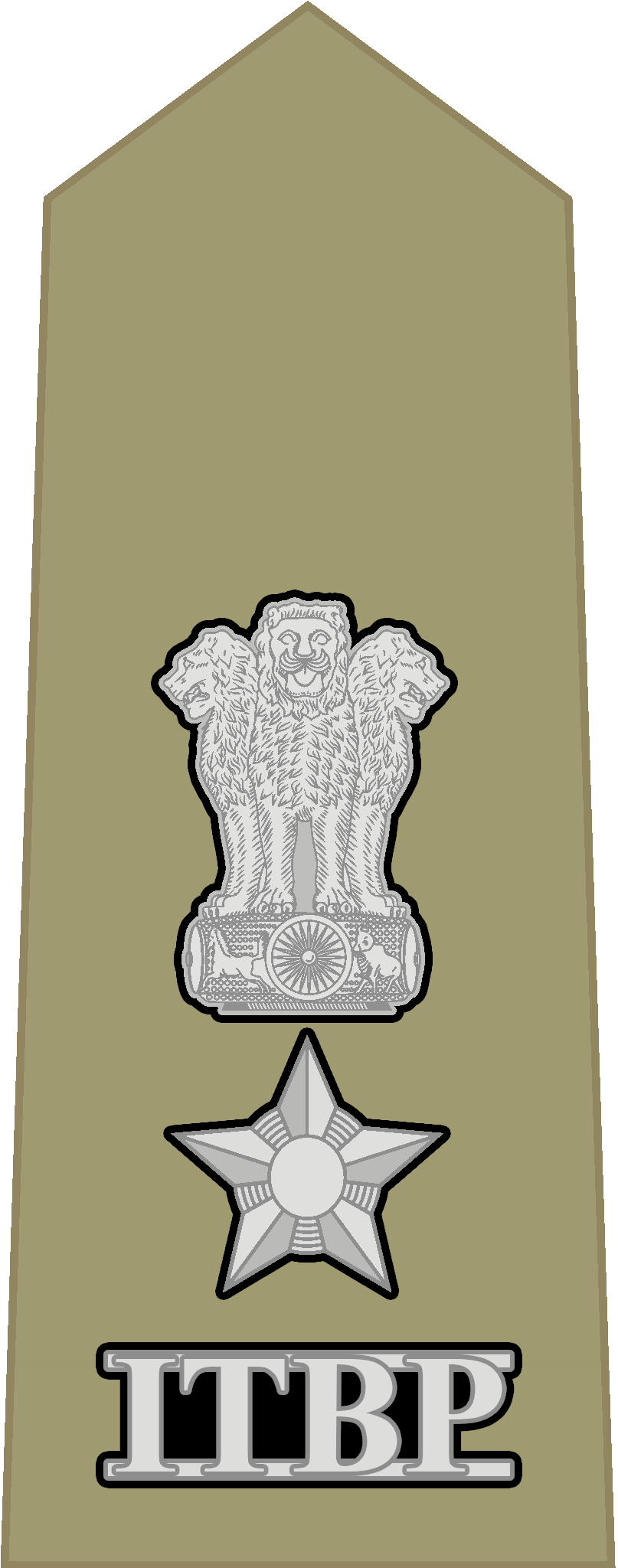
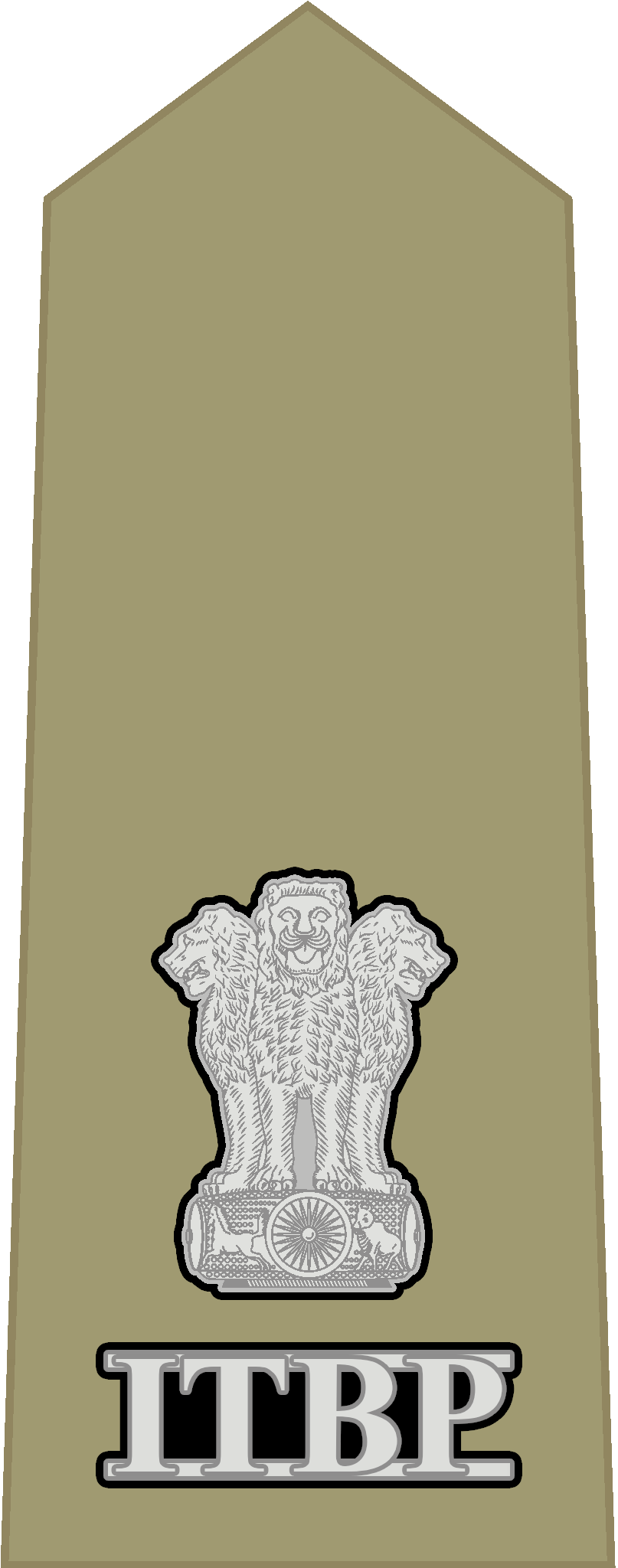
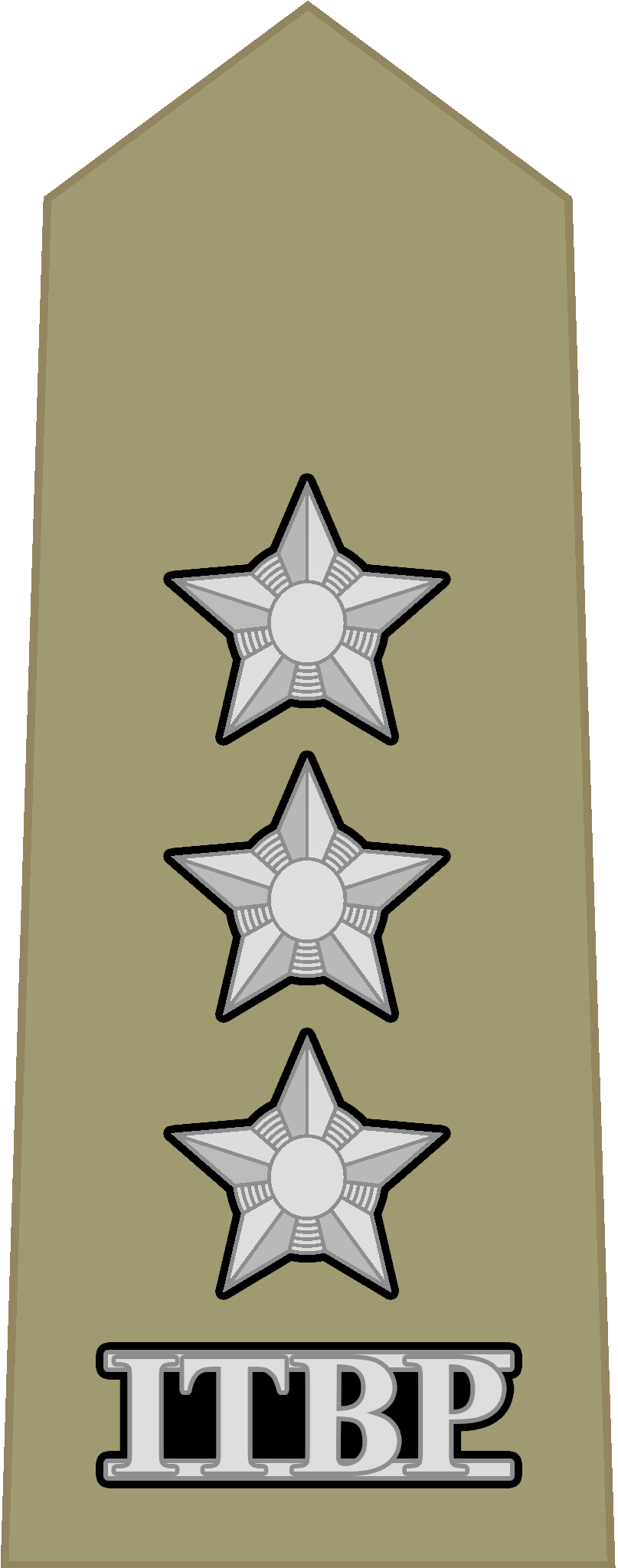
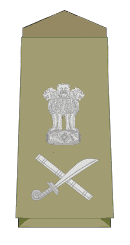
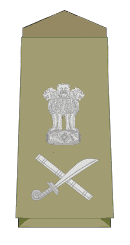
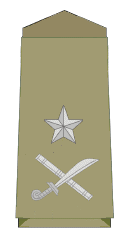
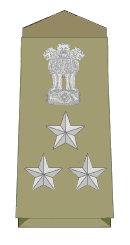
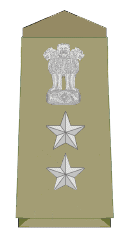
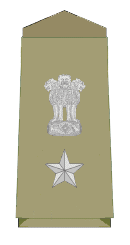
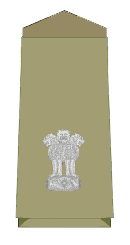
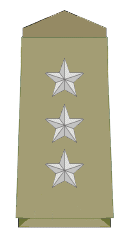
Rank group	General / flag officers					Senior officers			Junior officers
Assam Rifles	Director-general (Note: Equivalent to the rank lieutenant general (लेफ्टिनेंट - जनरल)) - / Special director-general (Note: Equivalent to the rank lieutenant general (लेफ्टिनेंट - जनरल)) - / Additional director-general (Note: Equivalent to the rank lieutenant general (लेफ्टिनेंट - जनरल)) -
Assam Rifles	Director-general - / Special director-general - / Additional director-general -		Inspector general (Note: Equivalent to the rank major general (मेजर - जनरल)) -	Deputy inspector-general (Note: Equivalent to the rank brigadier (ब्रिगेडियर)) -		Commandant (Note: Equivalent to the rank colonel (कर्नल)) -	Second-in-command (Note: Equivalent to the rank lieutenant colonel (लेफ्टिनेंट - कर्नल)) -	Deputy commandant (Note: Equivalent to the rank major (मेजर)) -	Assistant commandant (Note: Equivalent to the rank captain (कप्तान)) -
Border Security Force	Director-general - / Special director-general - / Additional director-general -
Border Security Force	Director-general - / Special director-general - / Additional director-general -		Inspector general -	Deputy inspector-general -		Commandant -	Second-in-command -	Deputy commandant -	Assistant commandant -
Central Industrial Security Force	Director-general - / Special director-general - / Additional director-general -
Central Industrial Security Force	Director-general - / Special director-general - / Additional director-general -		Inspector general -	Deputy inspector-general -		Senior commandant -	Commandant -	Deputy commandant -	Assistant commandant -
Central Reserve Police Force	Director-general - / Special director-general - / Additional director-general -
Central Reserve Police Force	Director-general - / Special director-general - / Additional director-general -		Inspector general -	Deputy inspector-general -		Commandant -	Second-in-command -	Deputy commandant -	Assistant commandant -
Indo-Tibetan Border Police
Indo-Tibetan Border Police	Director-general -	Additional director-general -	Inspector general -	Deputy inspector-general -	Additional deputy inspector-general -	Commandant -	Second-in-command -	Deputy commandant -	Assistant commandant -
National Security Guard
National Security Guard	Director general -	Additional director general -	Inspector general -	Deputy inspector general -		Group commander -	Second in command -	Squadron commander -	Team commander -
Sashastra Seema Bal
Sashastra Seema Bal	Director-general -	Additional director-general -	Inspector general -	Deputy inspector-general -		Commandant -	Second-in-command -	Deputy commandant -	Assistant commandant -
Police equivalent	Director general / Director general / Additional; Director general of police		Inspector general	Deputy inspector general		Senior superintendent	Superintendent	Additional superintendent	Deputy superintendent	Assistant superintendent

Other ranks

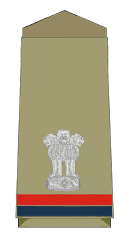
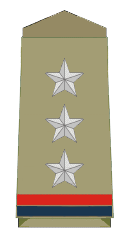
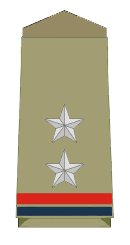
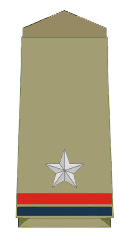
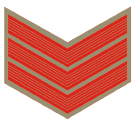
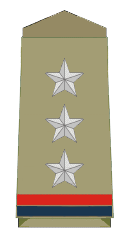
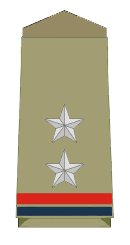
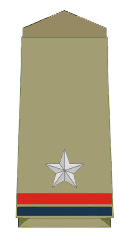
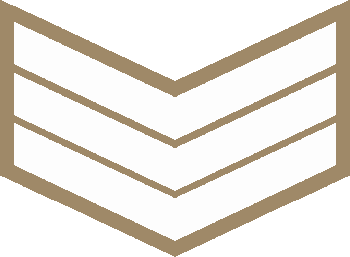
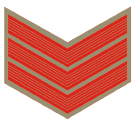
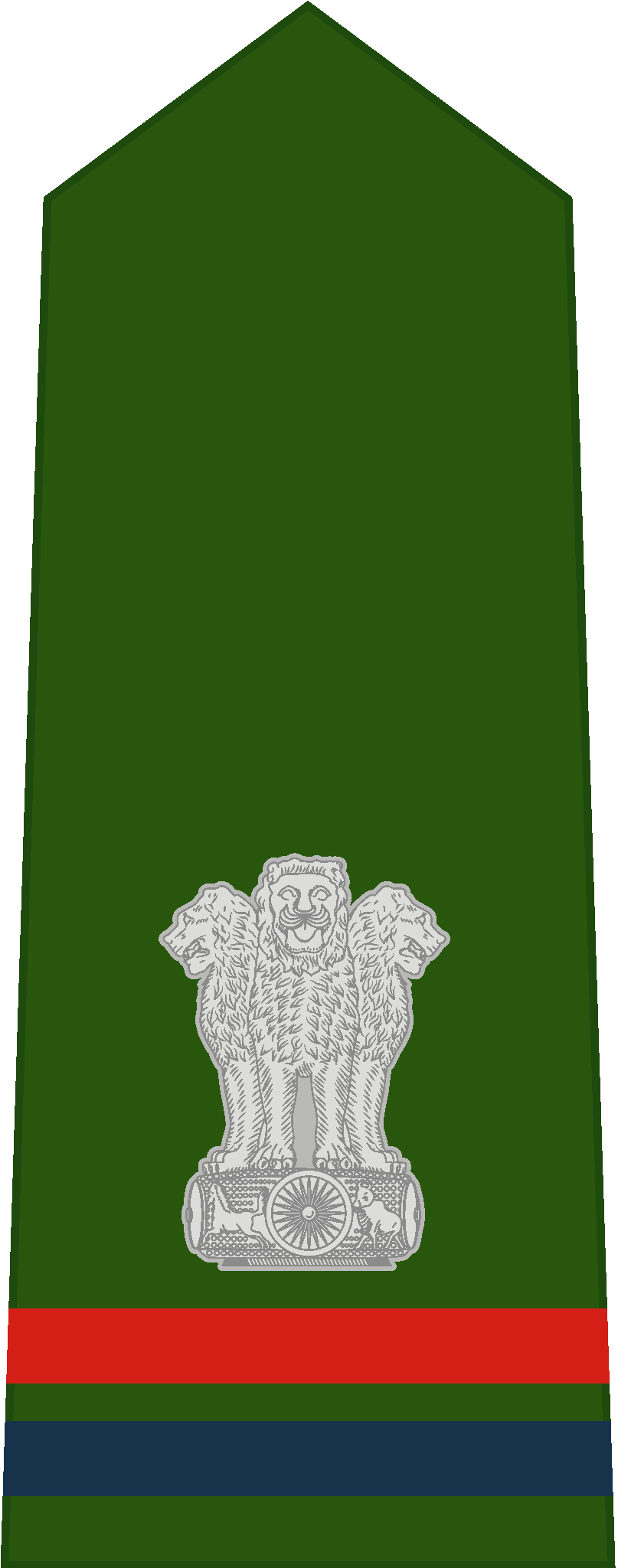
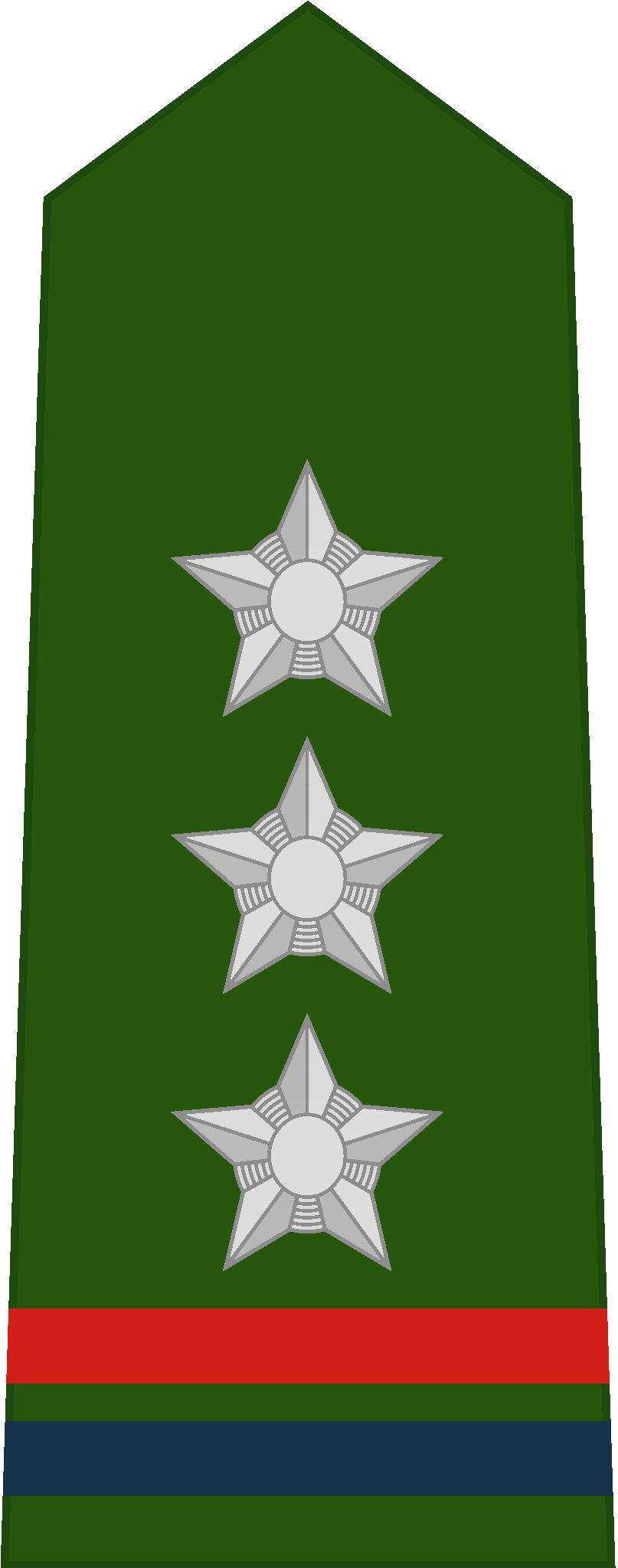
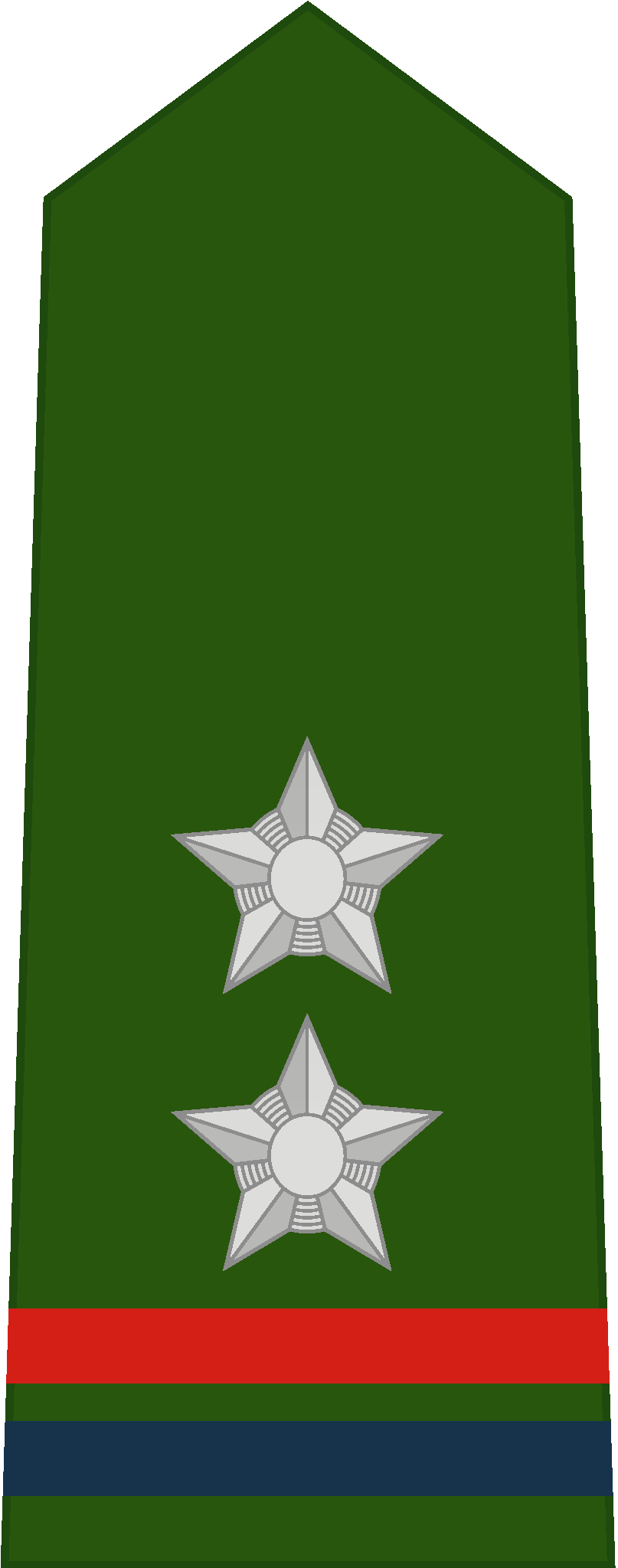
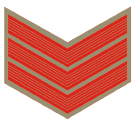
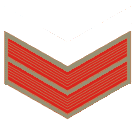
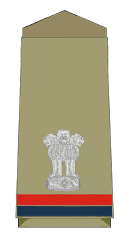
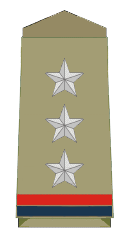
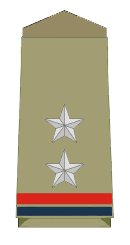
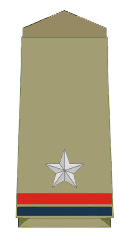
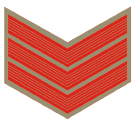
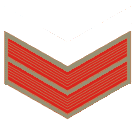
Rank group	Senior NCOs						Junior NCOs		Enlisted
Assam Rifles									No insignia
Assam Rifles	Subedar major सूबेदार मेजर	Subedar सूबेदार		Naib subedar नायब सूबेदार	Warrant officer -	Havildar (Note: Equivalent to the rank head constable (-)) हवलदार			Rifleman (Note: Equivalent to the rank constable (-)) -
Border Security Force									No insignia
Border Security Force	Subedar major सूबेदार मेजर	Inspector निरीक्षक	Sub-inspector उप निरीक्षक	Assistant sub-inspector सहायक उप निरीक्षक	Head constable हवलदार				Constable कनिष्ठबल
Central Industrial Security Force									No insignia
Central Industrial Security Force		Inspector निरीक्षक	Sub inspector उप निरीक्षक	Assistant sub-inspector सहायक उप निरीक्षक	Head constable हवलदार				Constable कनिष्ठबल
Central Reserve Police Force									No insignia
Central Reserve Police Force	Subedar major सूबेदार मेजर	Inspector निरीक्षक	Sub-inspector उप निरीक्षक	Assistant sub-inspector सहायक उप निरीक्षक	Head constable हवलदार				Constable कनिष्ठबल
Indo-Tibetan Border Police									No insignia
Indo-Tibetan Border Police	Subedar major सूबेदार मेजर	Subedar/Inspector सूबेदार/निरीक्षक	Sub inspector उप निरीक्षक		Head constable हवलदार		Naik नायक	Lance naik लांस नायक	Constable कनिष्ठबल
National Security Guard									No insignia
National Security Guard	Subedar major सूबेदार मेजर	Assistant commander-1 -	Assistant commander-2 -	Assistant commander-3 -	Ranger grade I -		Ranger grade II -		Combatised tradesmen -
Sashastra Seema Bal									No insignia
Sashastra Seema Bal	Subedar major सूबेदार मेजर	Inspector निरीक्षक	Sub inspector उप निरीक्षक	Assistant sub-inspector सहायक उप निरीक्षक	Head constable हवलदार		Naik नायक	Lance naik लांस नायक	Constable कनिष्ठबल

== Indonesia ==
Officers

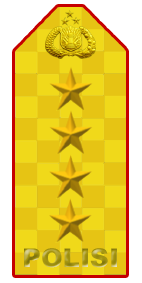
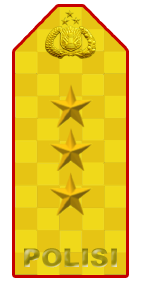
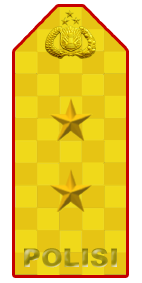
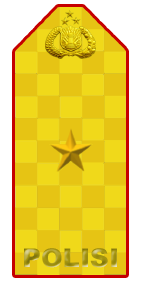
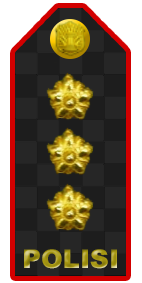
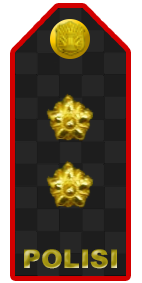
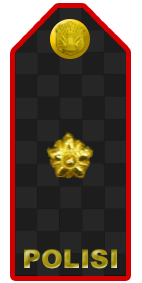
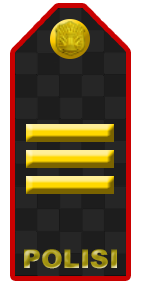
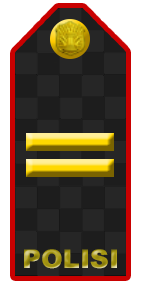
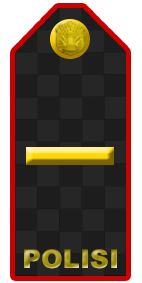
Rank group	General / flag officers				Senior officers			Junior officers
	General officers				Field officers			Subaltern officers
Indonesia
Indonesia	Jenderal Polisi (Jenderal Pol.)	Komisaris Jenderal Polisi (Komjen Pol.)	Inspektur Jenderal Polisi (Irjen Pol.)	Brigadir Jenderal Polisi (Brigjen Pol.)	Komisaris Besar Polisi (Kombes Pol.)	Ajun Komisaris Besar Polisi (AKBP)	Komisaris Polisi (Kompol)	Ajun Komisaris Polisi (AKP)	Inspektur Polisi Satu (Iptu)	Inspektur Polisi Dua (Ipda)
Indonesia	Police general	Police commissioner general	Police inspector general	Police brigadier general	Police chief commissioner	Police adjunct chief commissioner	Police commissioner	Police adjunct commissioner	Police 1st inspector	Police 2nd inspector

Others

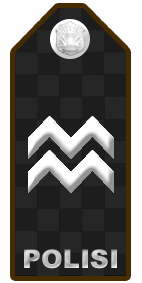
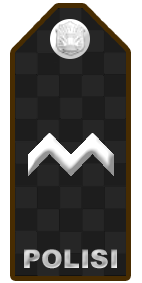
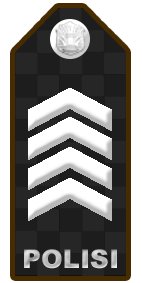
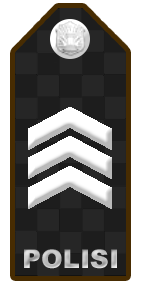
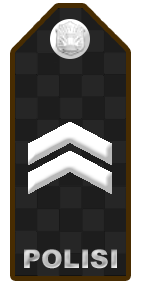
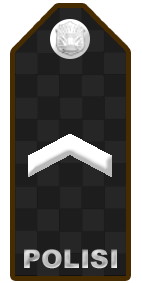
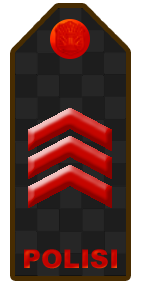
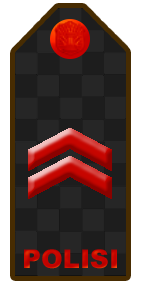
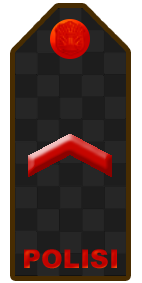
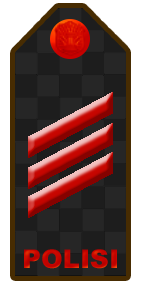
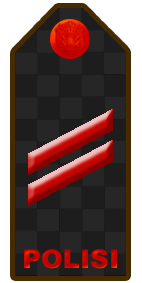
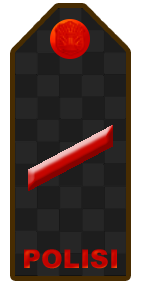
Rank group	Senior NCOs						Junior NCOs			Enlisted
	Sub-inspectors		Constables				High-rank enlisted			Junior enlisted
Indonesia
Indonesia	Ajun Inspektur Polisi Satu (Aiptu)	Ajun Inspektur Polisi Dua (Aipda)	Brigadir Polisi Kepala (Bripka)	Brigadir Polisi (Brigpol)	Brigadir Polisi Satu (Briptu)	Brigadir Polisi Dua (Bripda)	Ajun Brigadir Polisi (Abrigpol)	Ajun Brigadir Polisi Satu (Abriptu)	Ajun Brigadir Polisi Dua (Abripda)	Bhayangkara Kepala (Bharaka)	Bhayangkara Satu (Bharatu)	Bhayangkara Dua (Bharada)
Indonesia	Police 1st sub-inspector	Police 2nd sub-inspector	Police chief brigadier	Police brigadier	Police 1st brigadier	Police 2nd brigadier	Police sub brigadier	Police 1st sub-brigadier	Police 2nd sub-brigadier	Senior patrolman	1st patrolman	2nd patrolman

== Iran ==
=== Commissioned officer ranks ===
The rank insignia of commissioned officers.

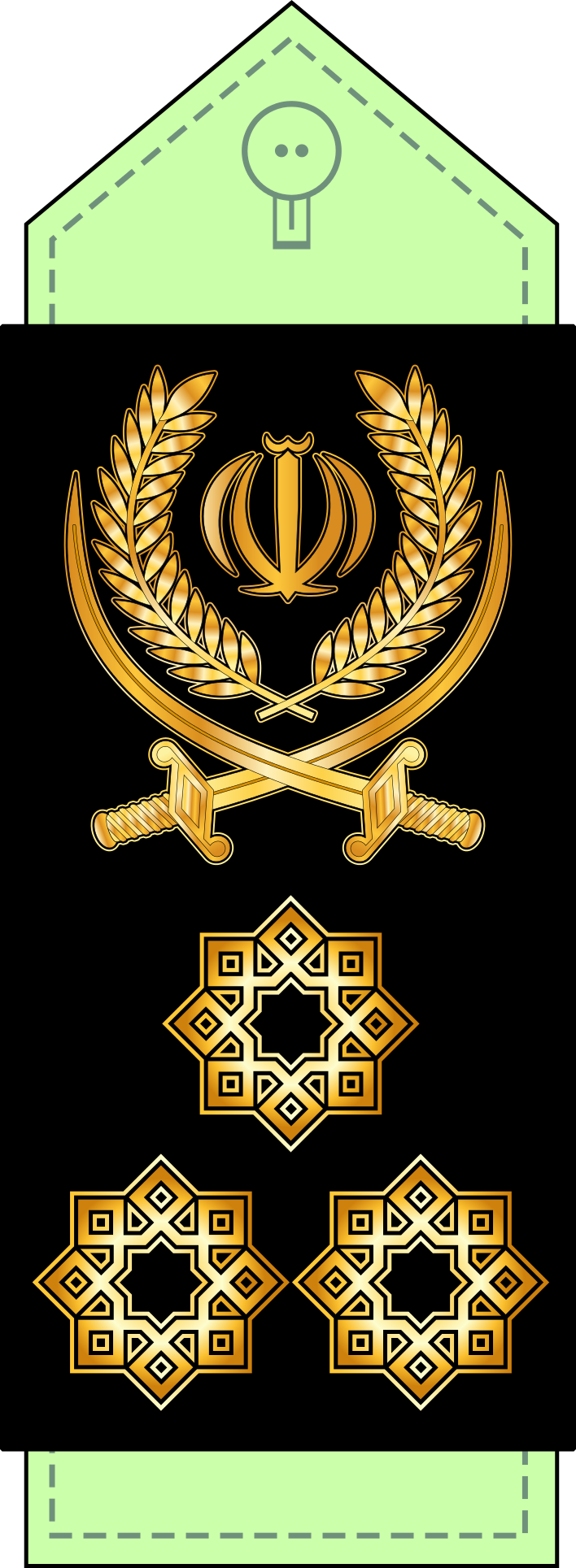
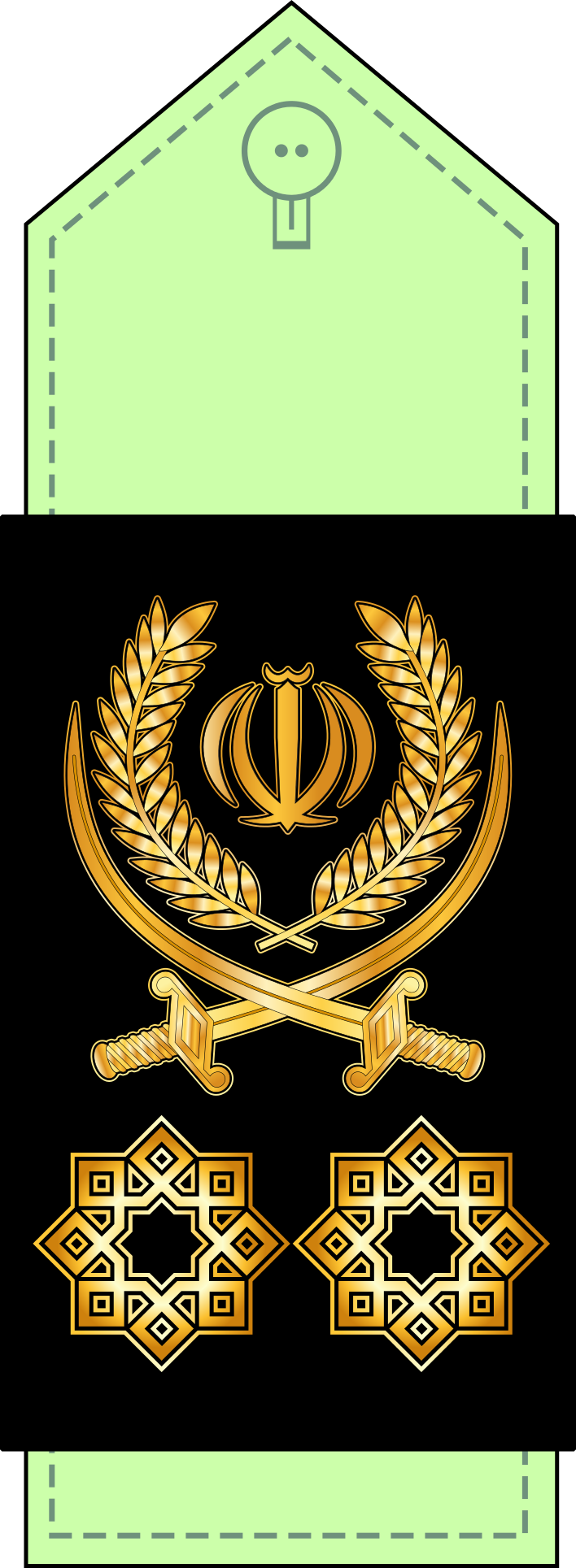
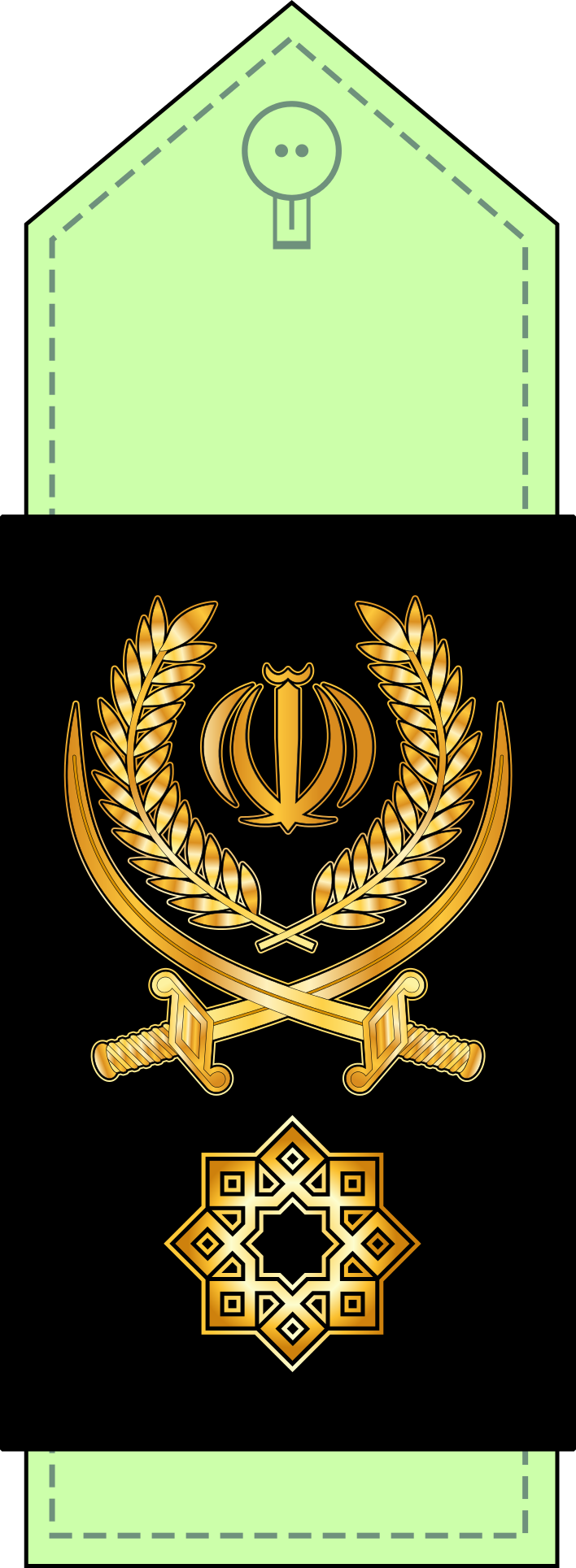
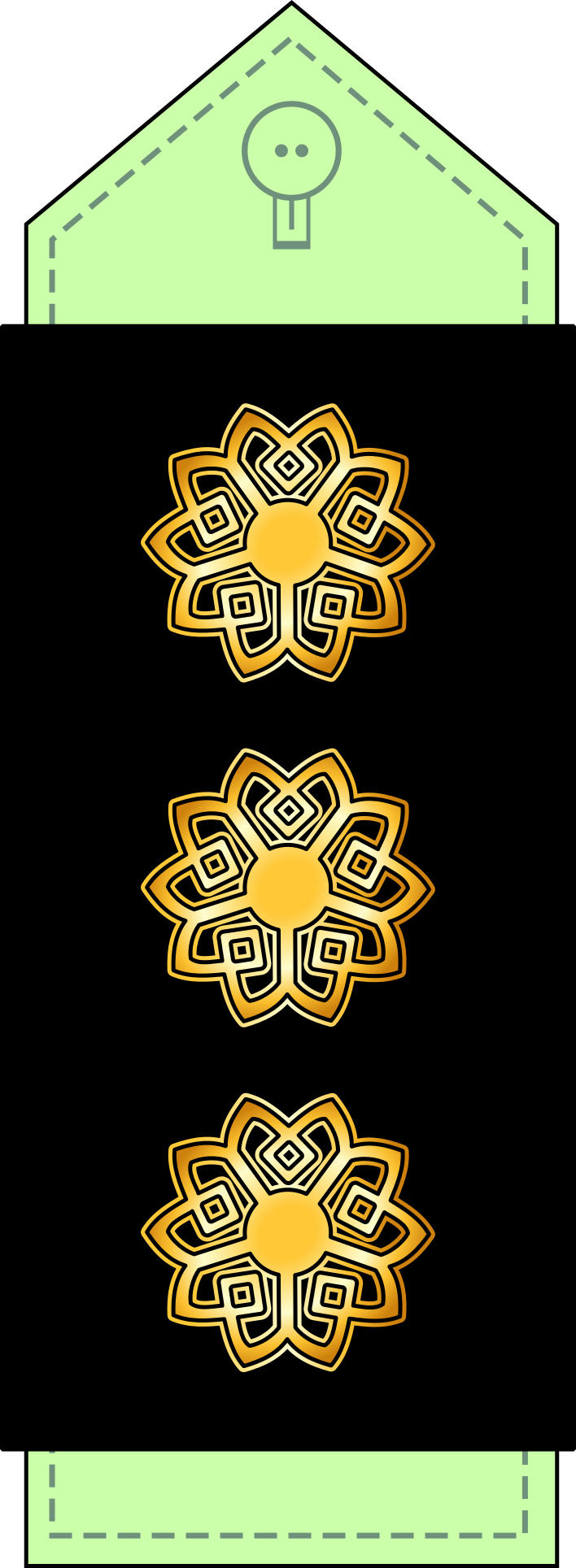
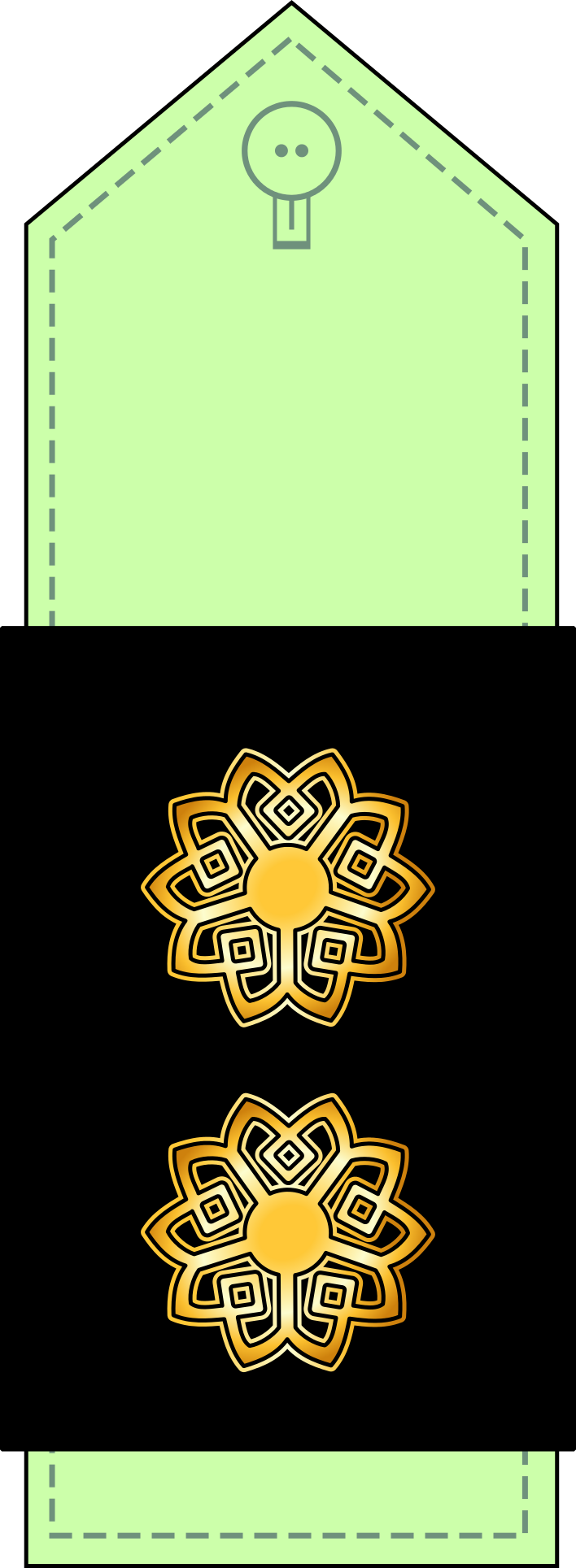
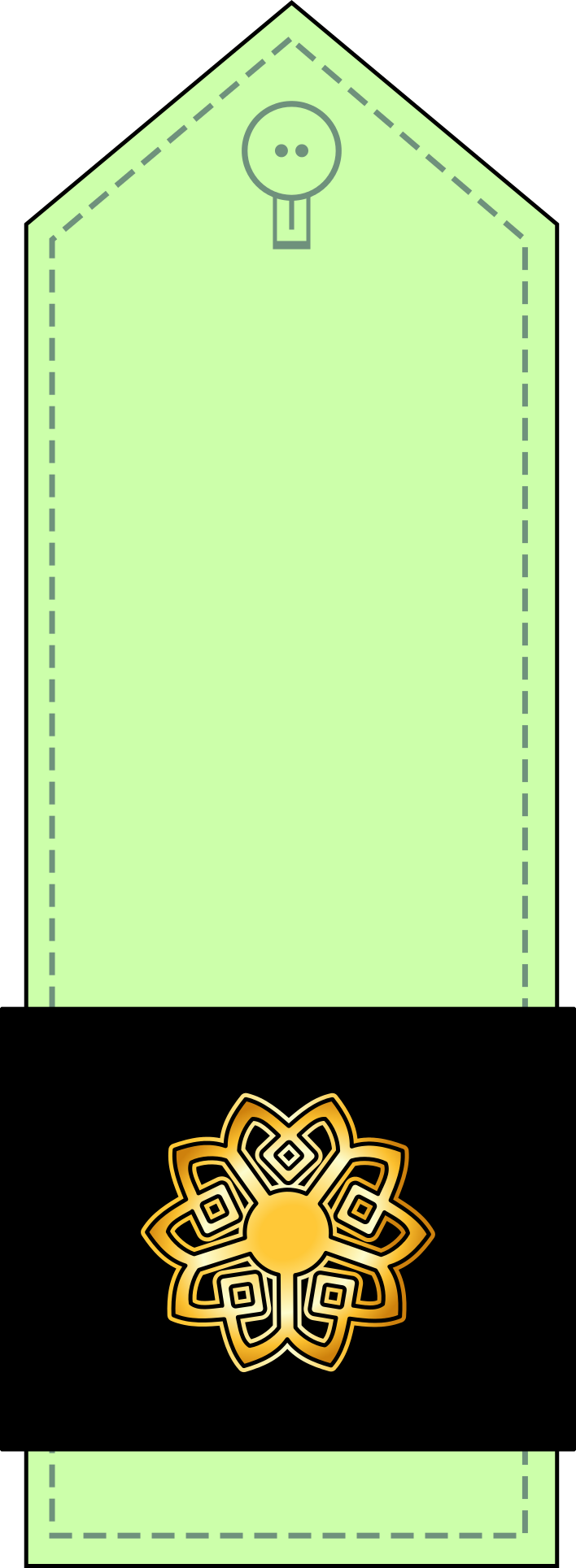
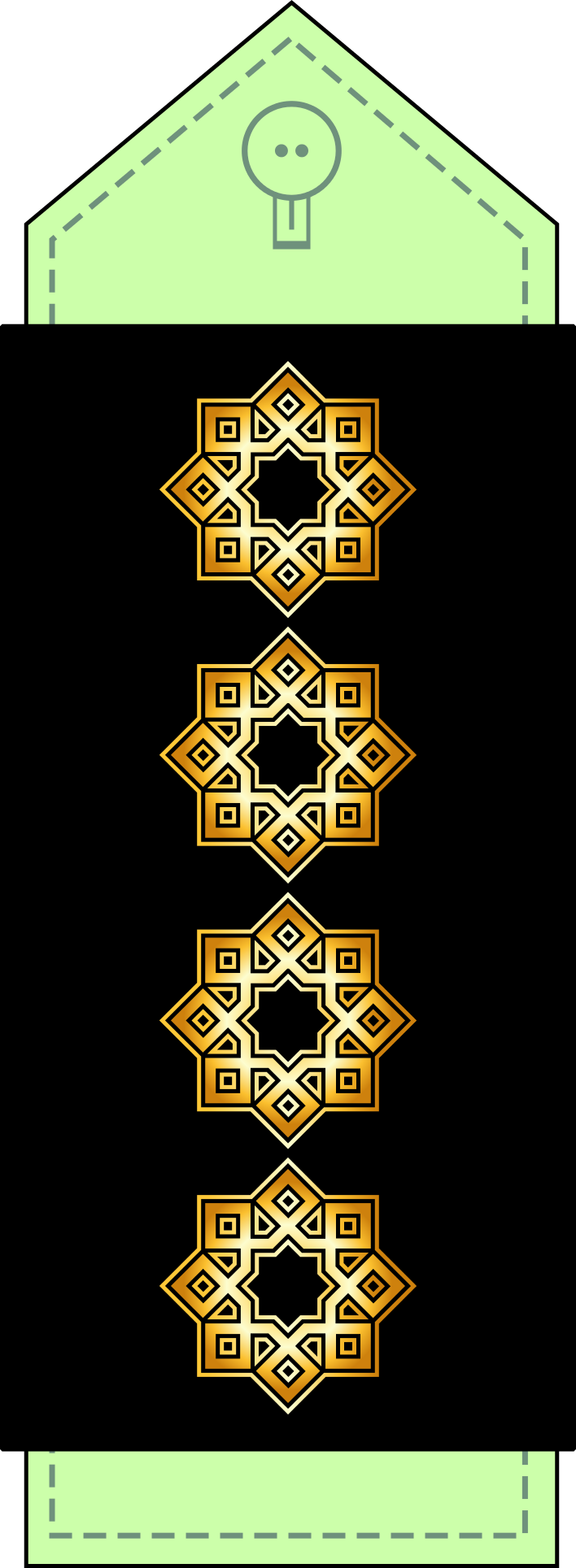
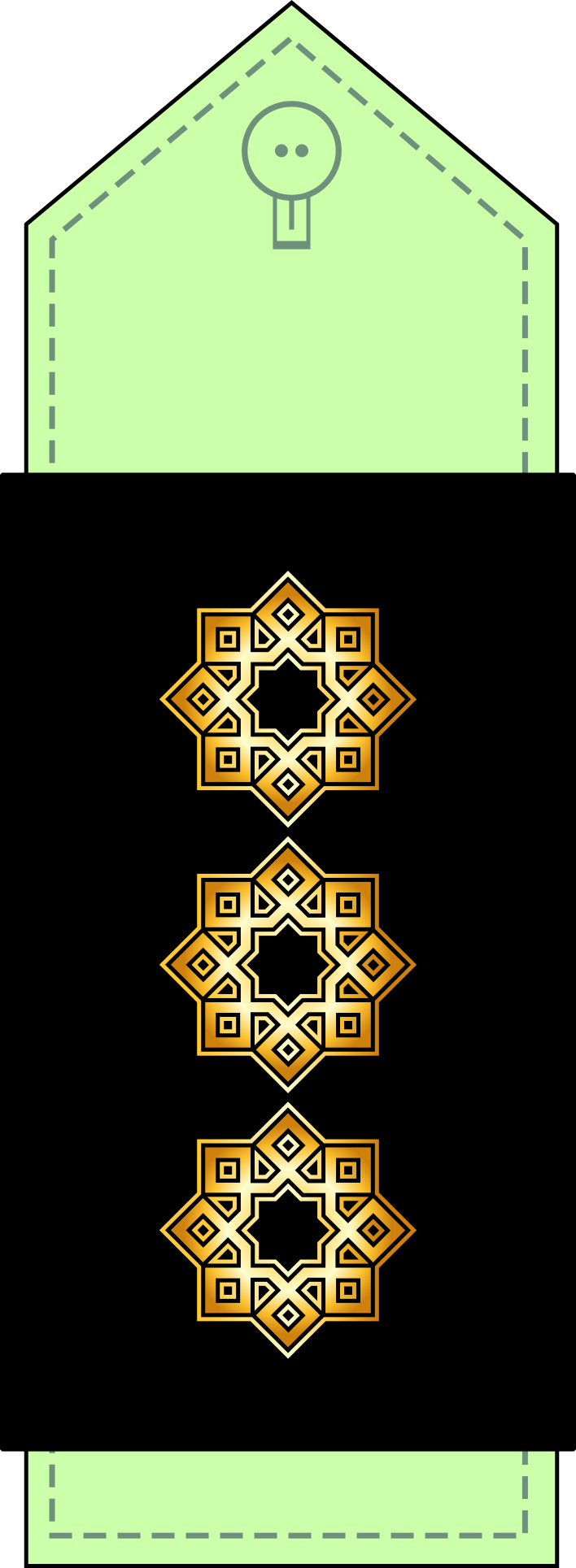
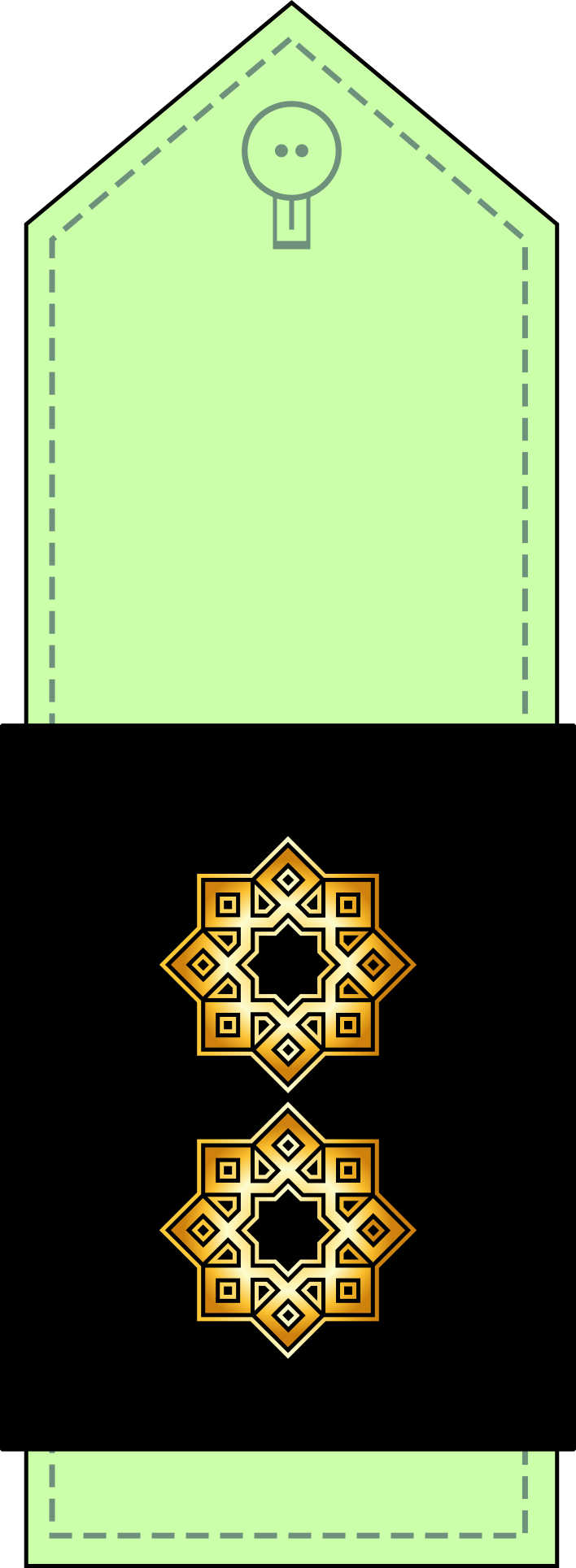
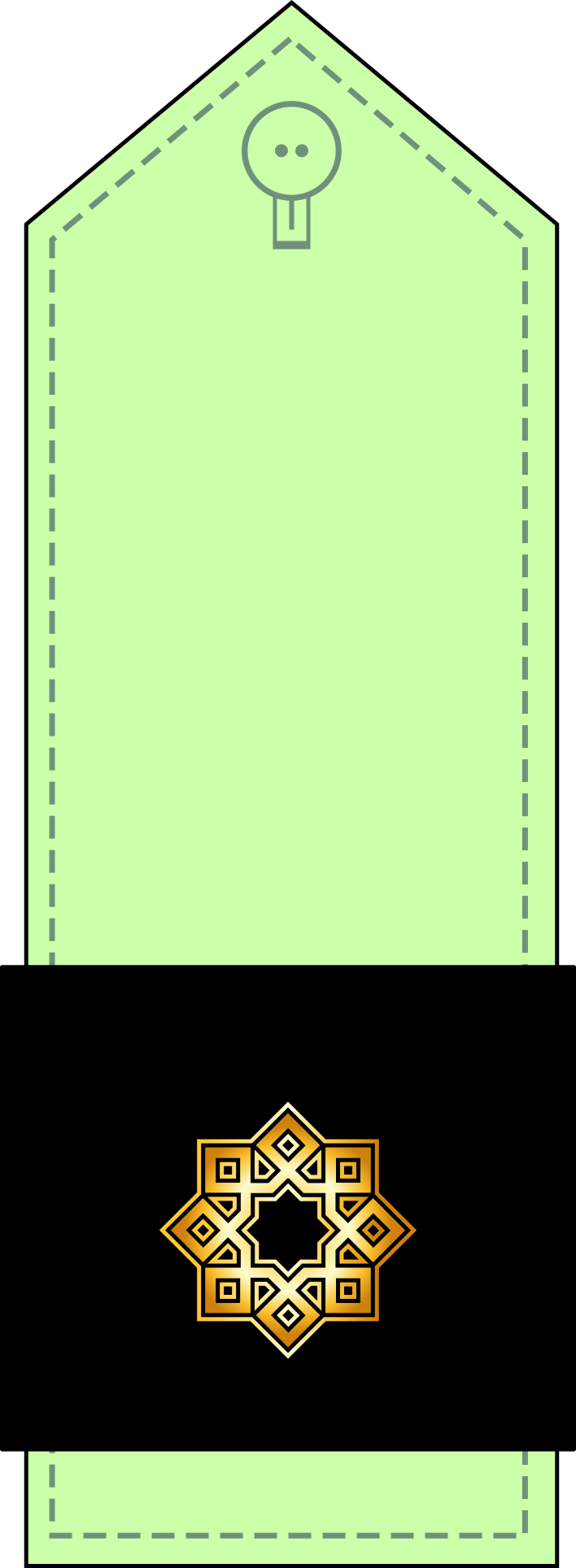
Rank group	General / flag officers						Senior officers			Junior officers
Police Command of the Islamic Republic of Iran
Police Command of the Islamic Republic of Iran	سپهبد; Sepahbod	سرلشکر; Sarlashkar	سرتیپ; Sartip	سرتیپ دوم; Sartip dovom	سرهنگ; Sarhang	سرهنگ دوم; Sarhang dovom	سرگرد; Sargord	سروان; Sarvān	ستوان یکم; Sotvān yekom	ستوان دوم; Sotvān dovom	ستوان سوم; Sotvān sevom

==== Student officer ranks ====
Rank group	4th year	3rd year	2nd year	1st year
Iranian Law Enforcement Command; Amin Police Academy

=== Other ranks ===
The rank insignia of non-commissioned officers and enlisted personnel.

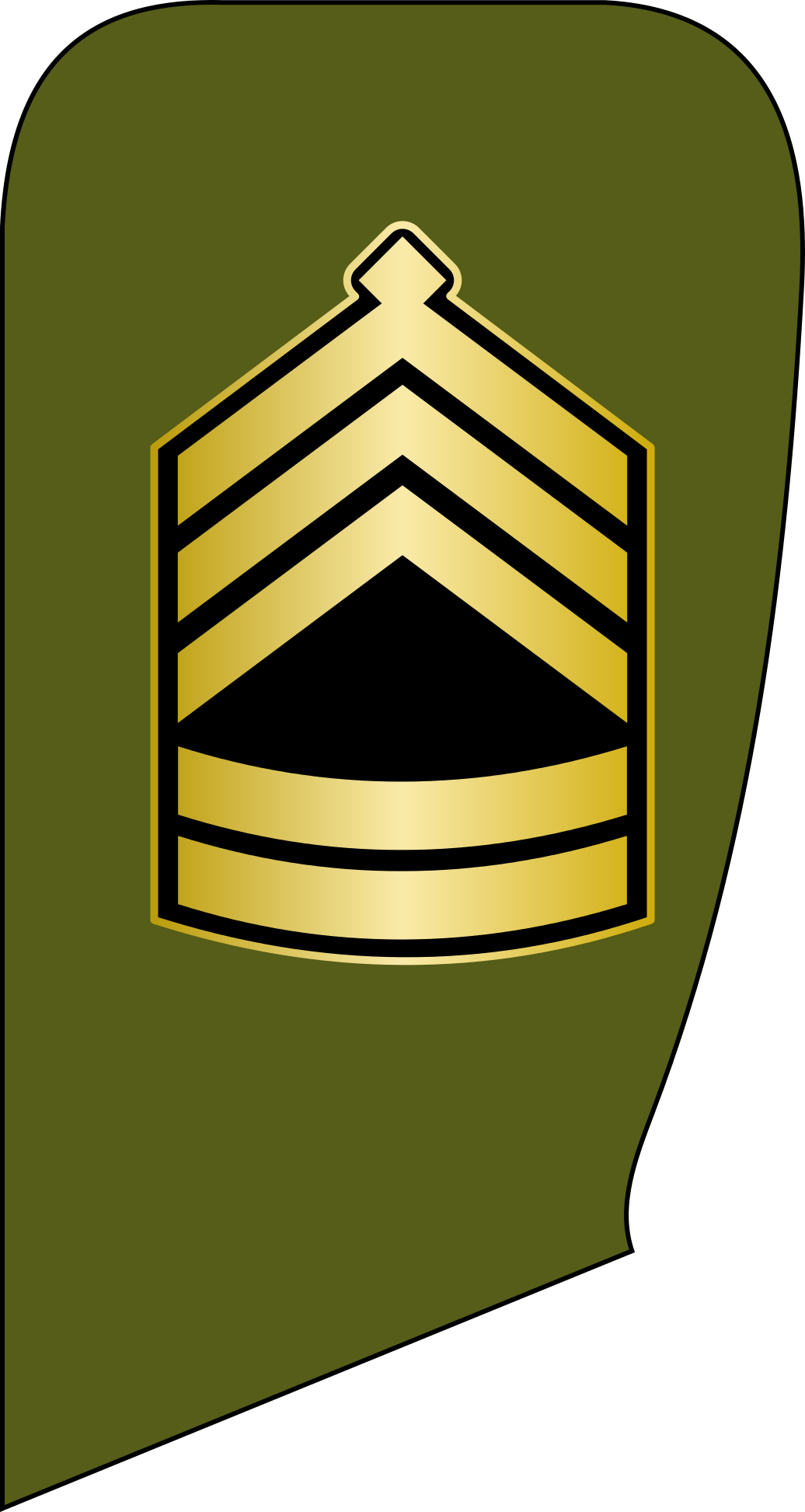
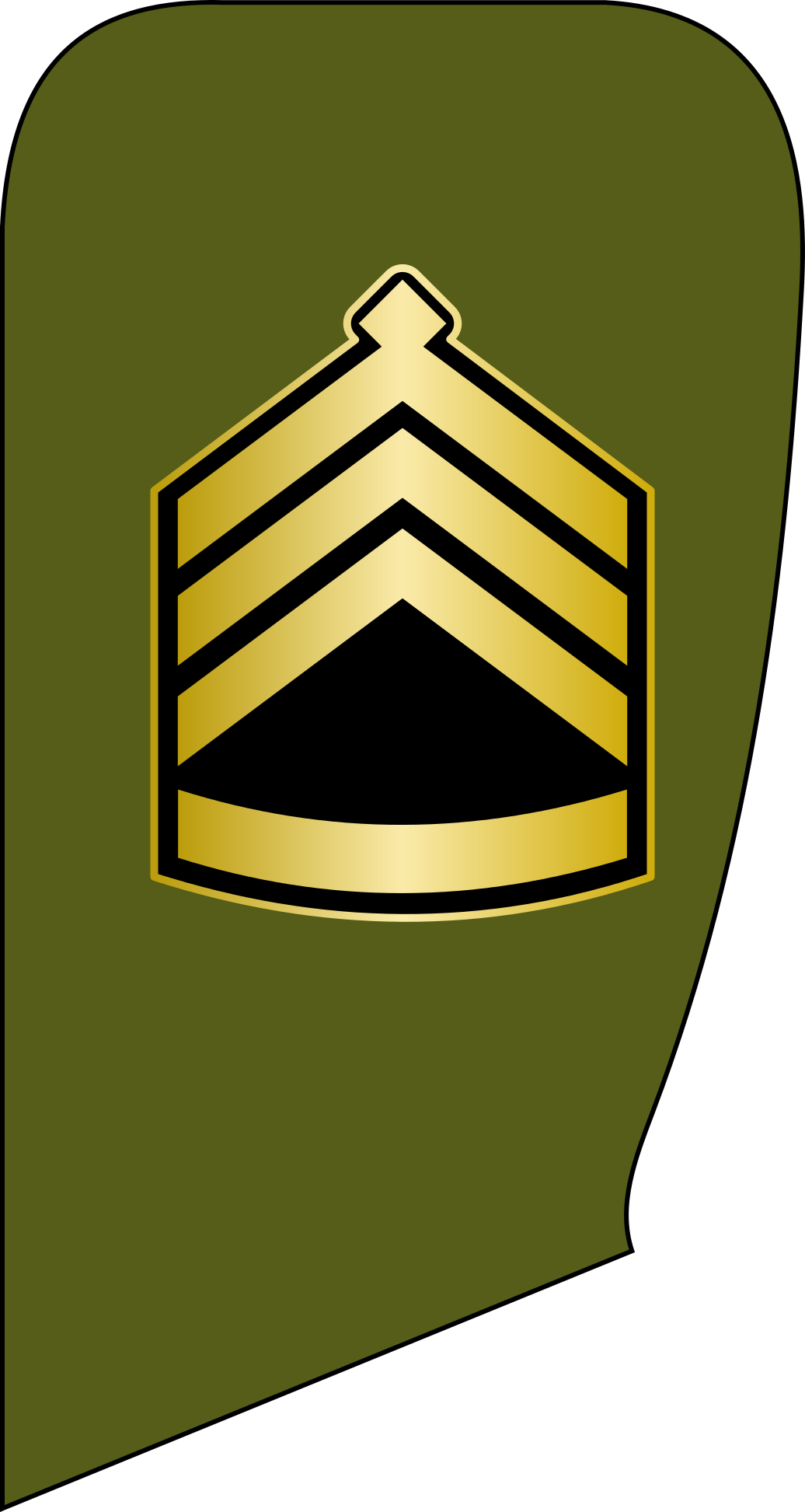
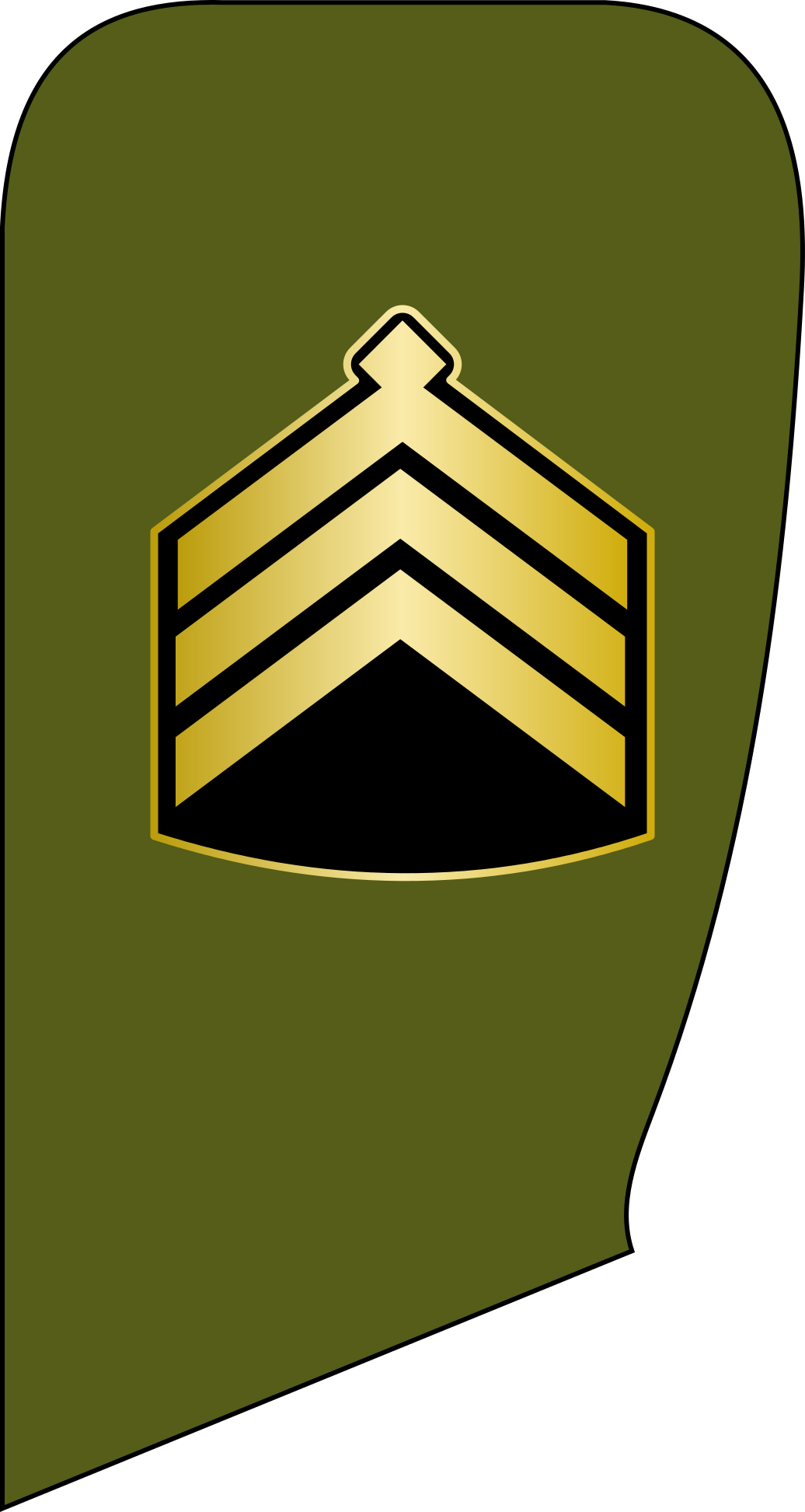
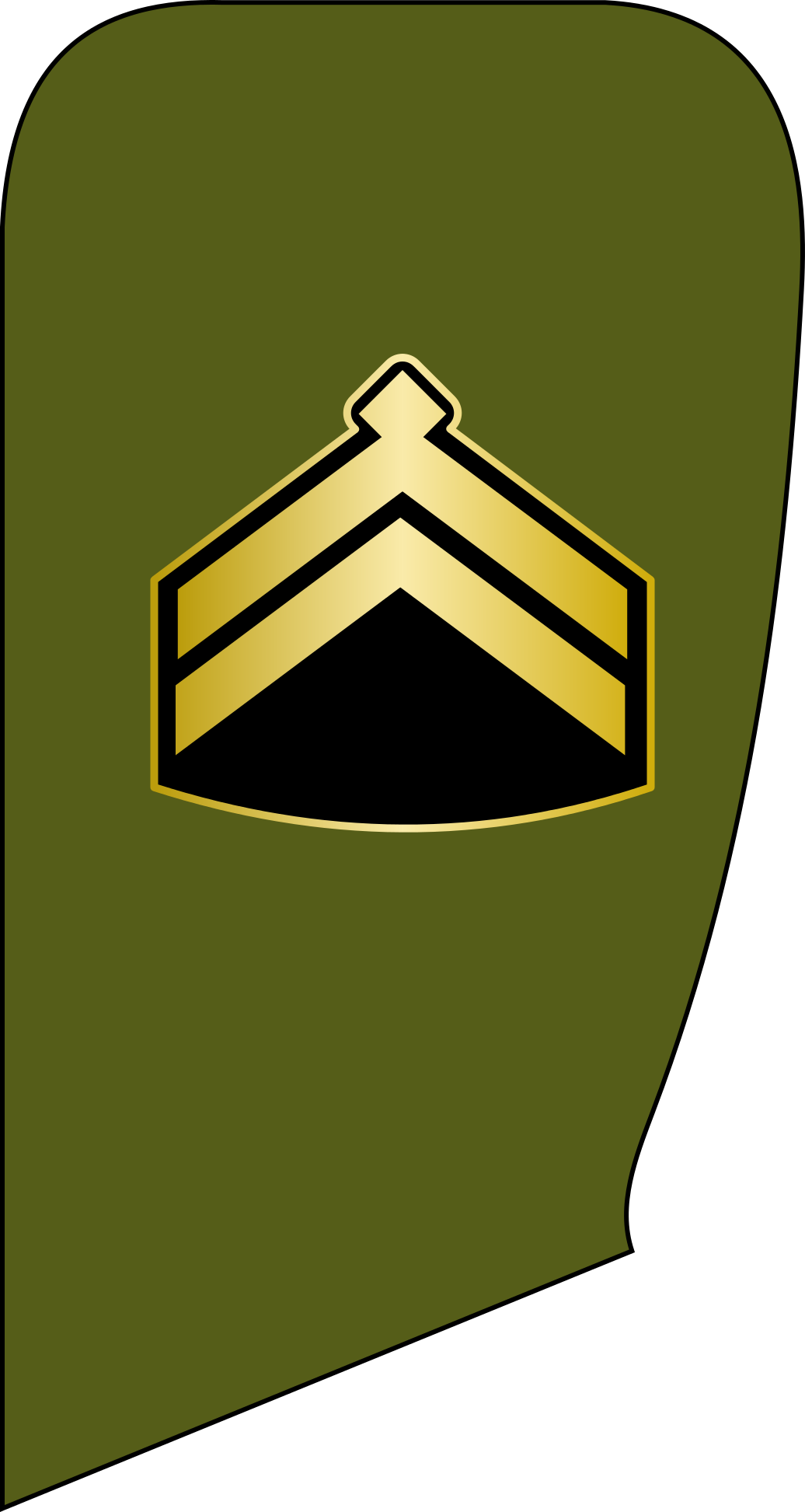
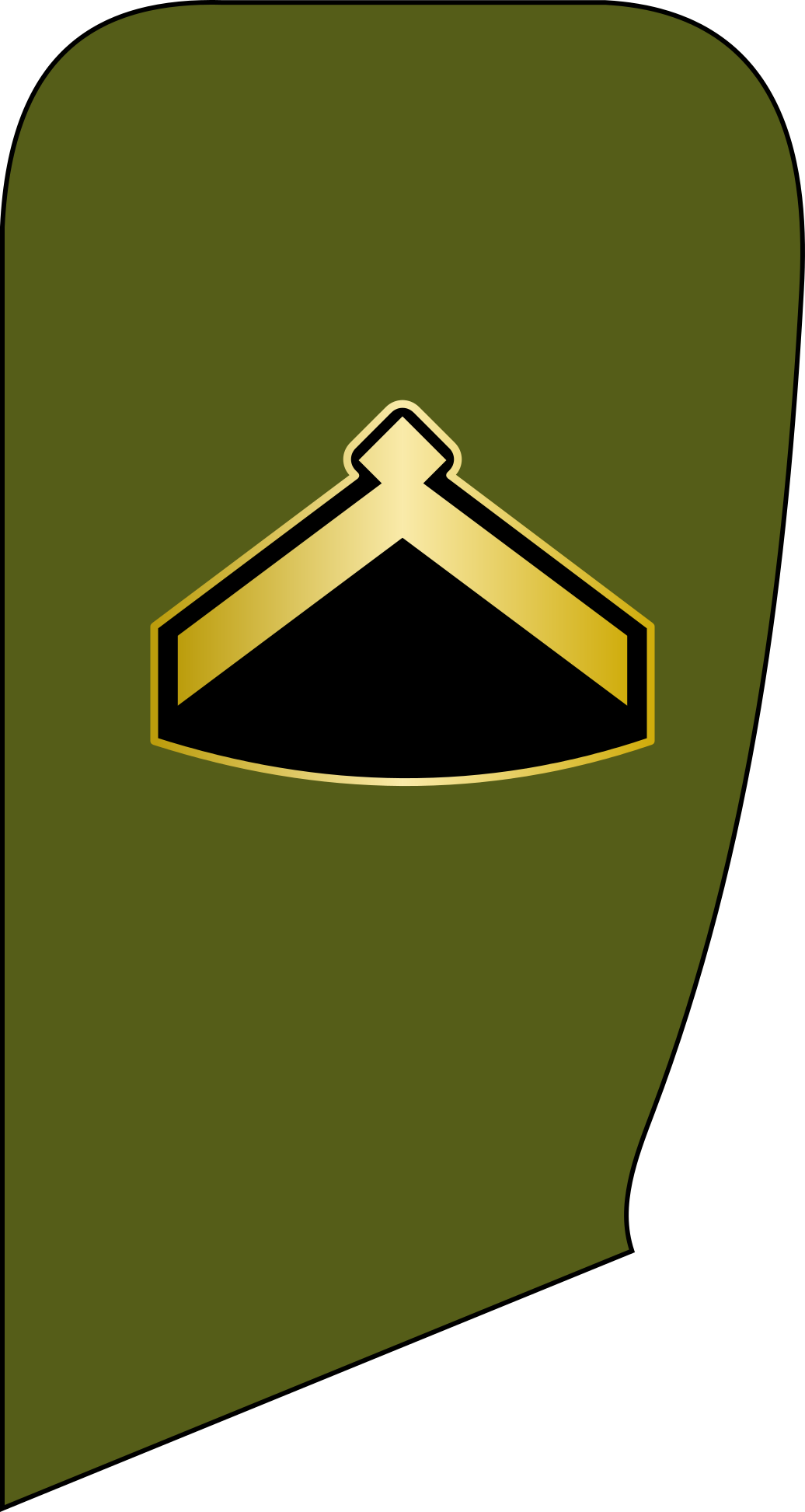
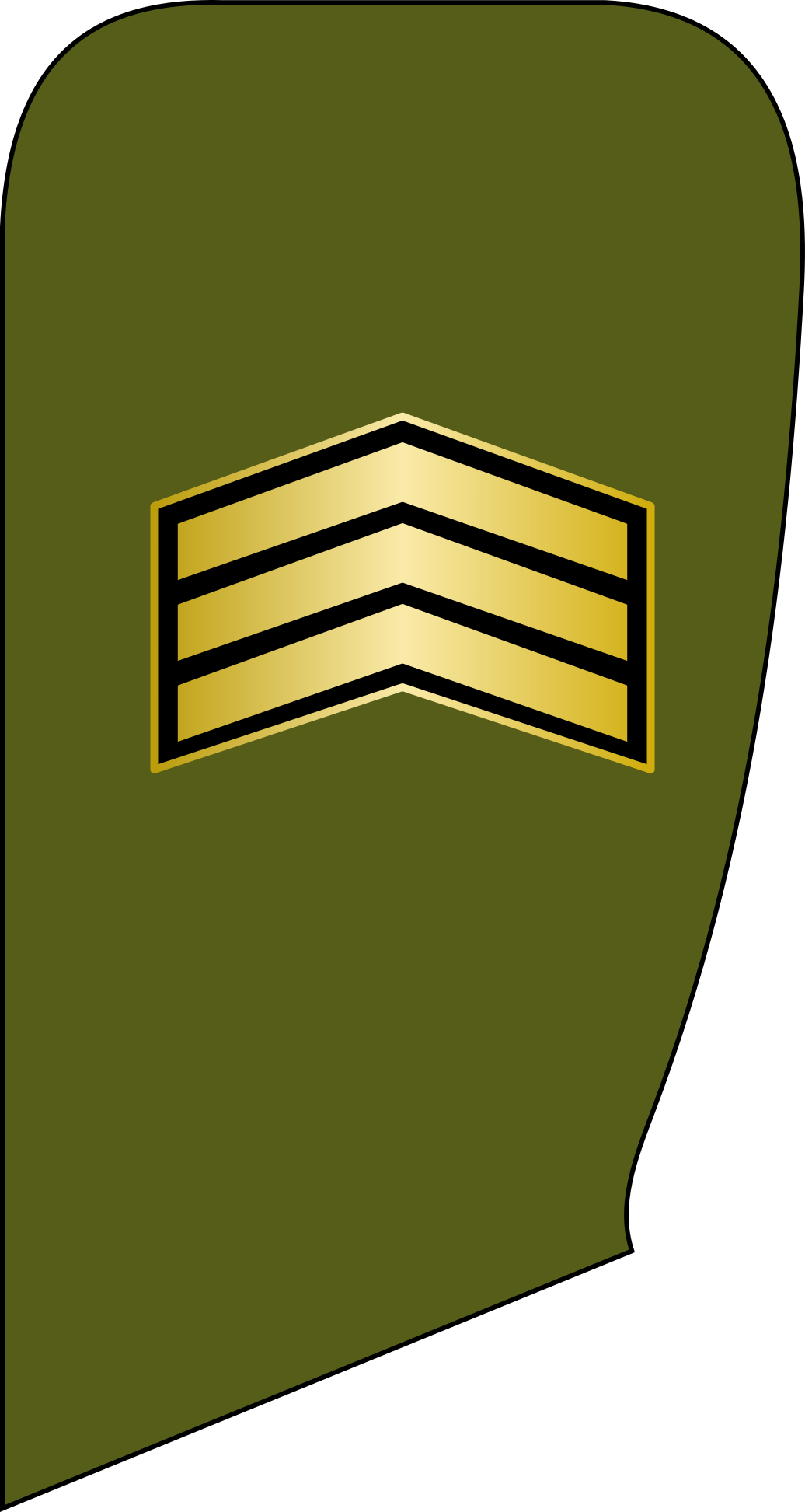
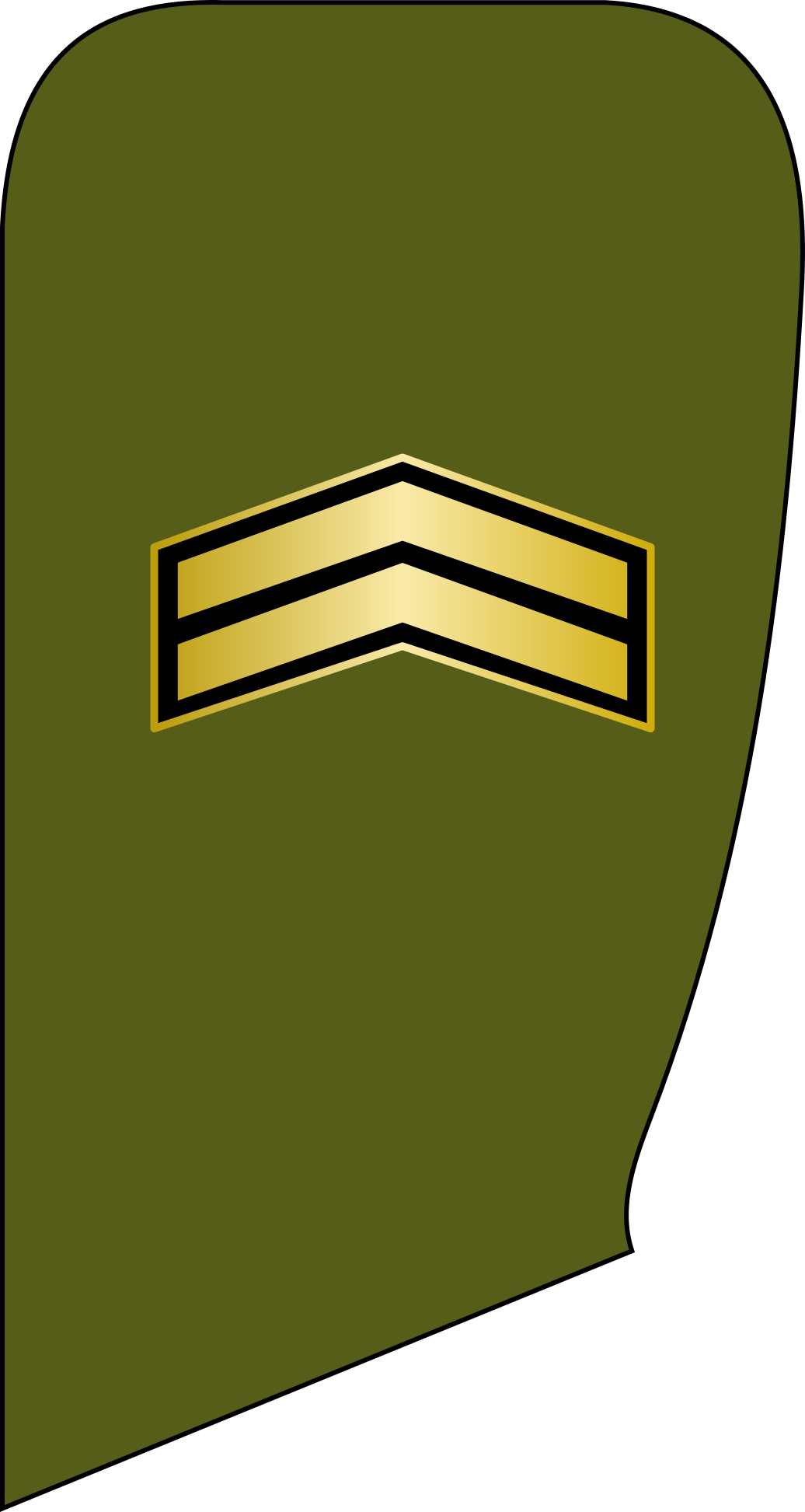
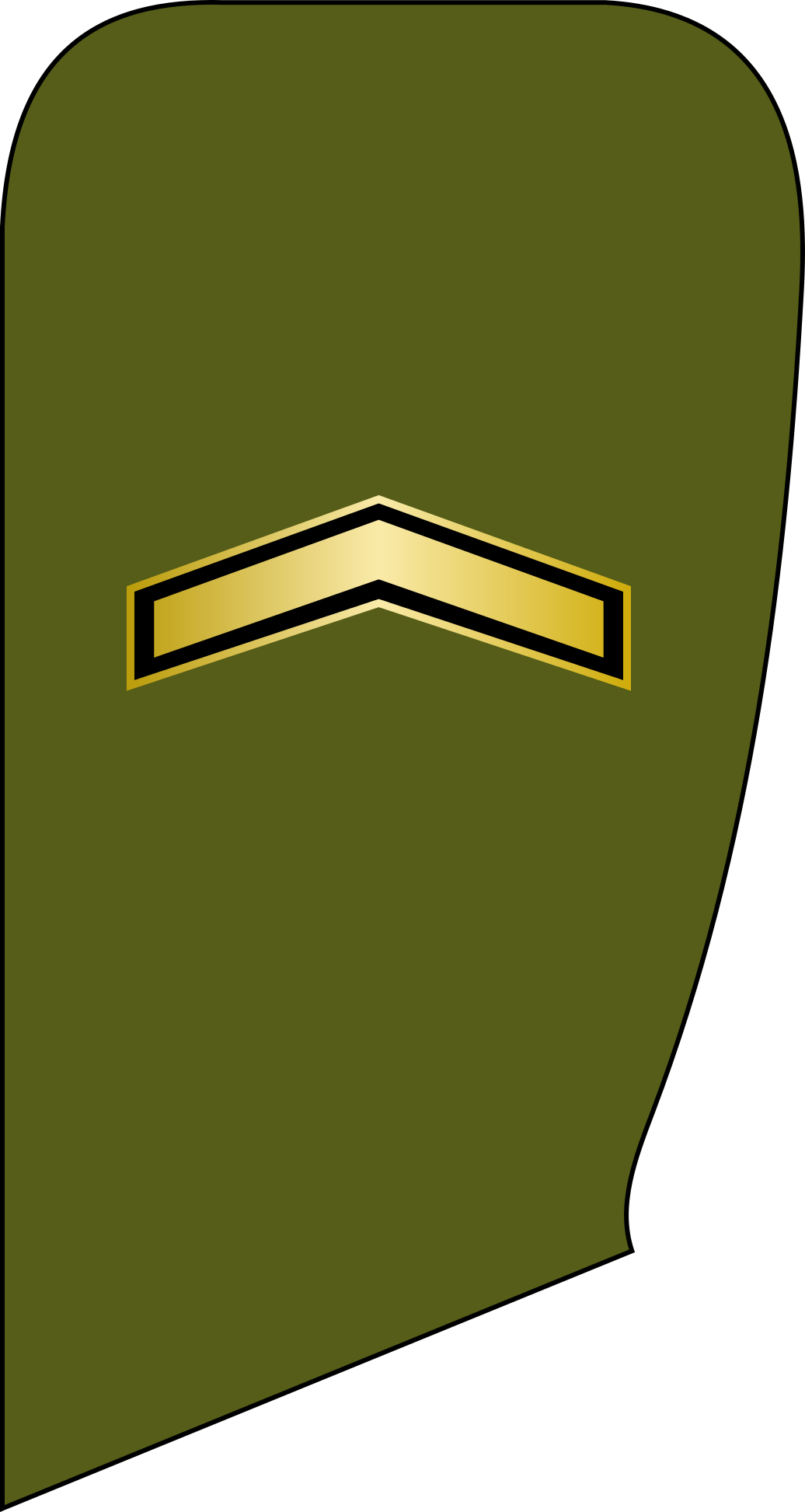
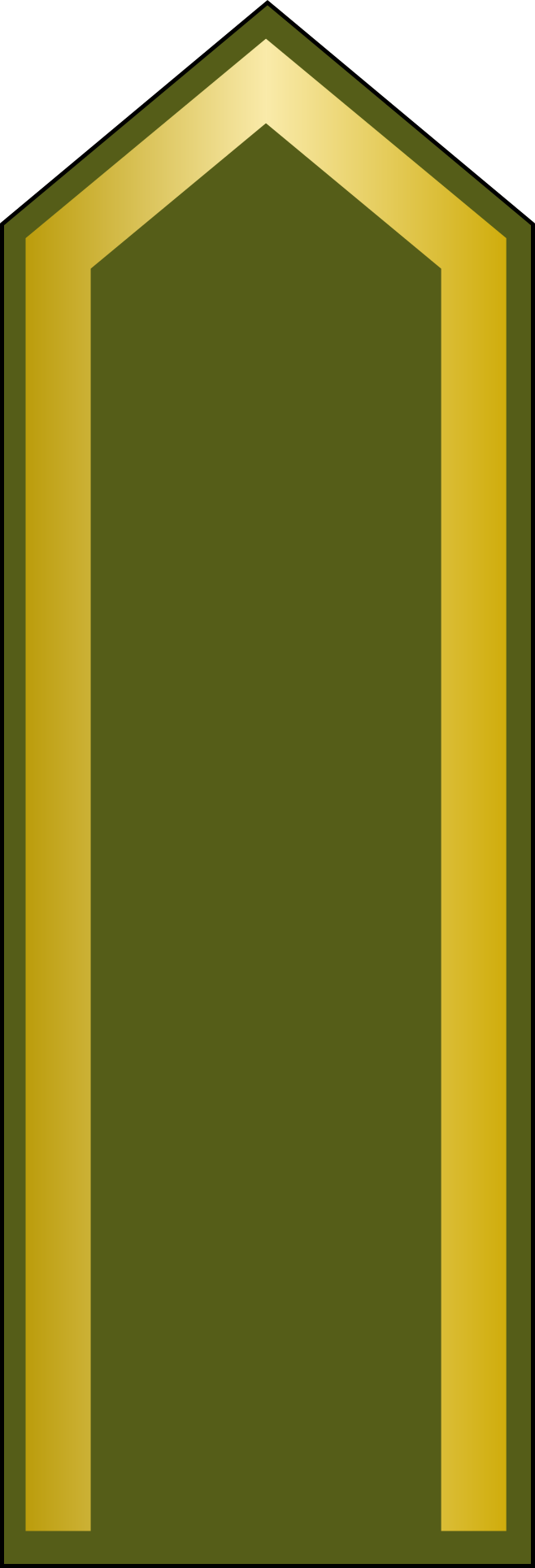
Rank group	Senior NCOs					Junior NCOs		Enlisted
Police Command of the Islamic Republic of Iran
Police Command of the Islamic Republic of Iran	استوار یکم; Ostovar yekom	استوار دوم; Ostovar dovom	گروهبان یکم; Goruhban yekom	گروهبان دوم; Goruhban dovom	گروهبان سوم; Goruhban sevom	سرجوخه; Sarjukheh	سرباز یکم; Sarbaz yekom	سرباز دوم; Sarbaz dovom	سرباز; Sarbaz

== Iraq ==
The Iraqi Police is made up of three branches, under the command of the Ministry of Interior, these being the Iraqi Police Service which tasked with general patrol of Iraq's cities, the Federal Police (earlier was called National Police) which is a gendarmerie service which deals with incidents that are beyond the control of the Iraqi Police Service, but are not so serious the Iraqi Army are involved, and the supporting force that is made up of the Department of Border Enforcement.

The Iraqi Police commissioned officers ranks are the same that of the Iraqi Armed Forces, ordered lowest to highest with symbol on epaulette however the difference is that the Police ranks have silver insignia whereas the Armed Forces ranks have golden insignia.

Furthermore, there is a category of ranks in between the commissioned ranks and other ranks that is simply translated as "warrant officer" rank category.

=== Insignia ===
Officers

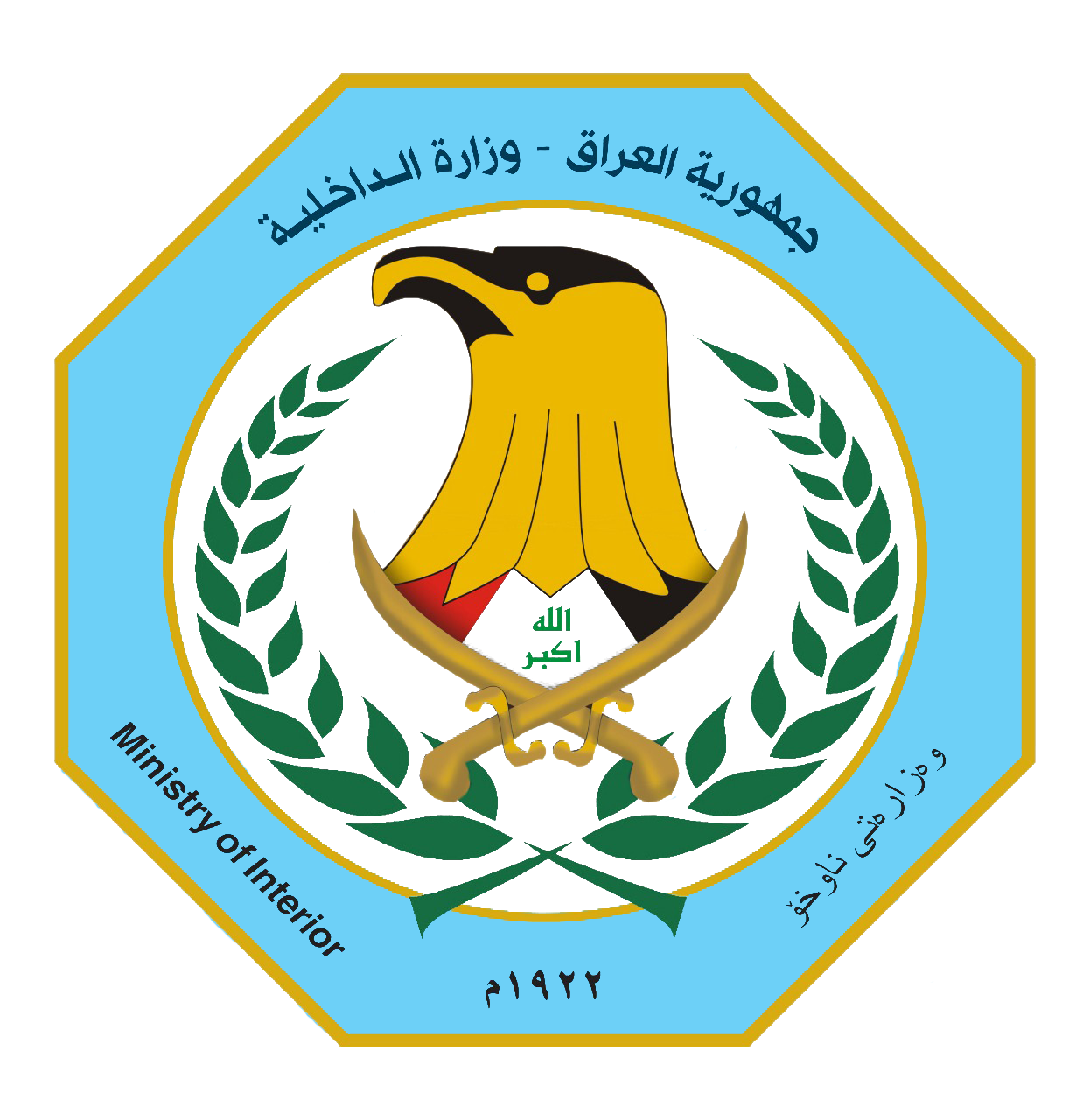
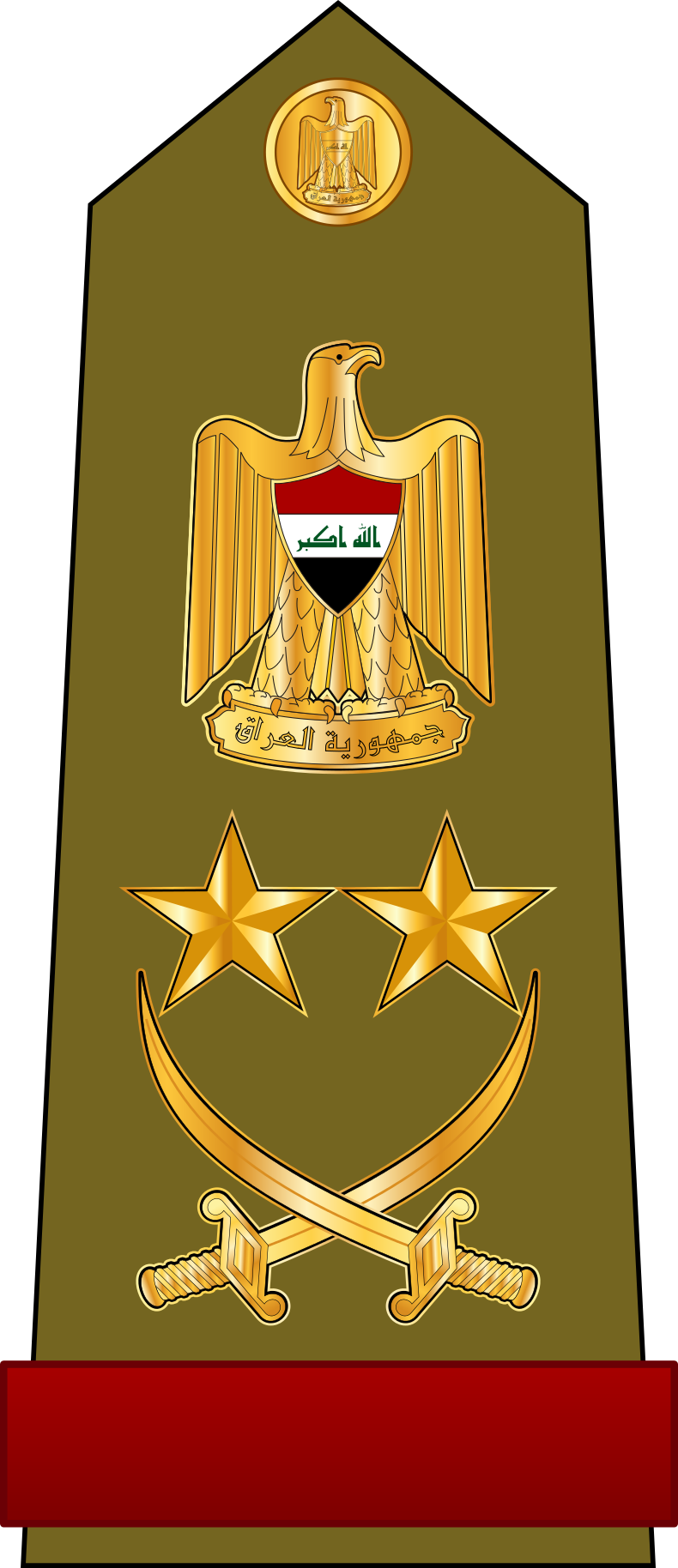
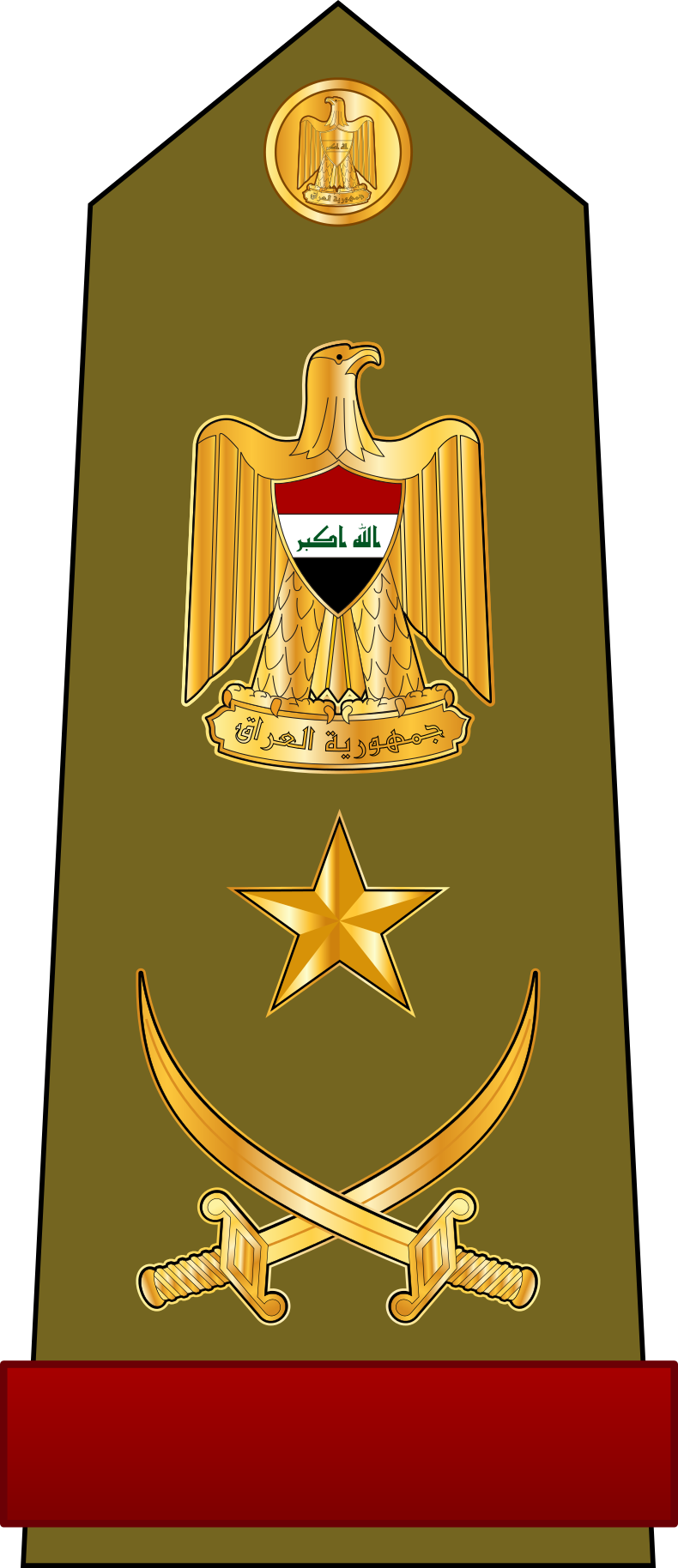
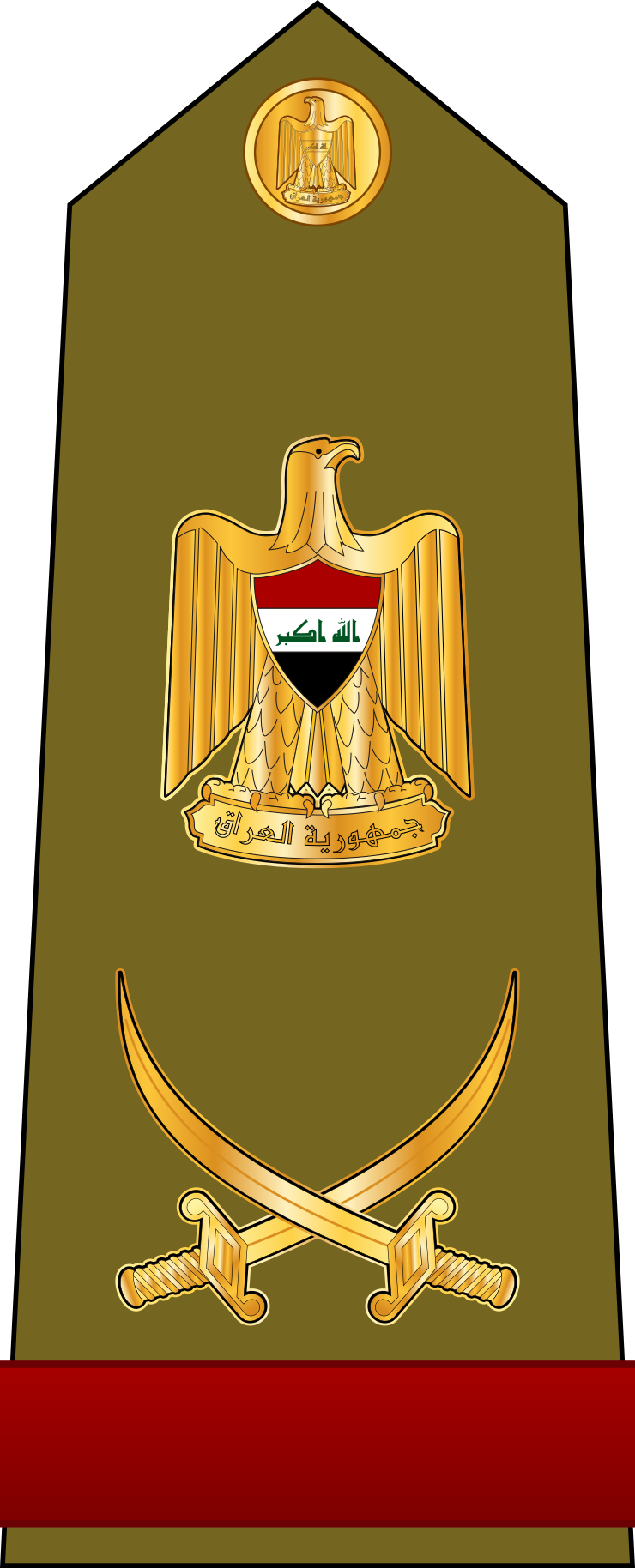
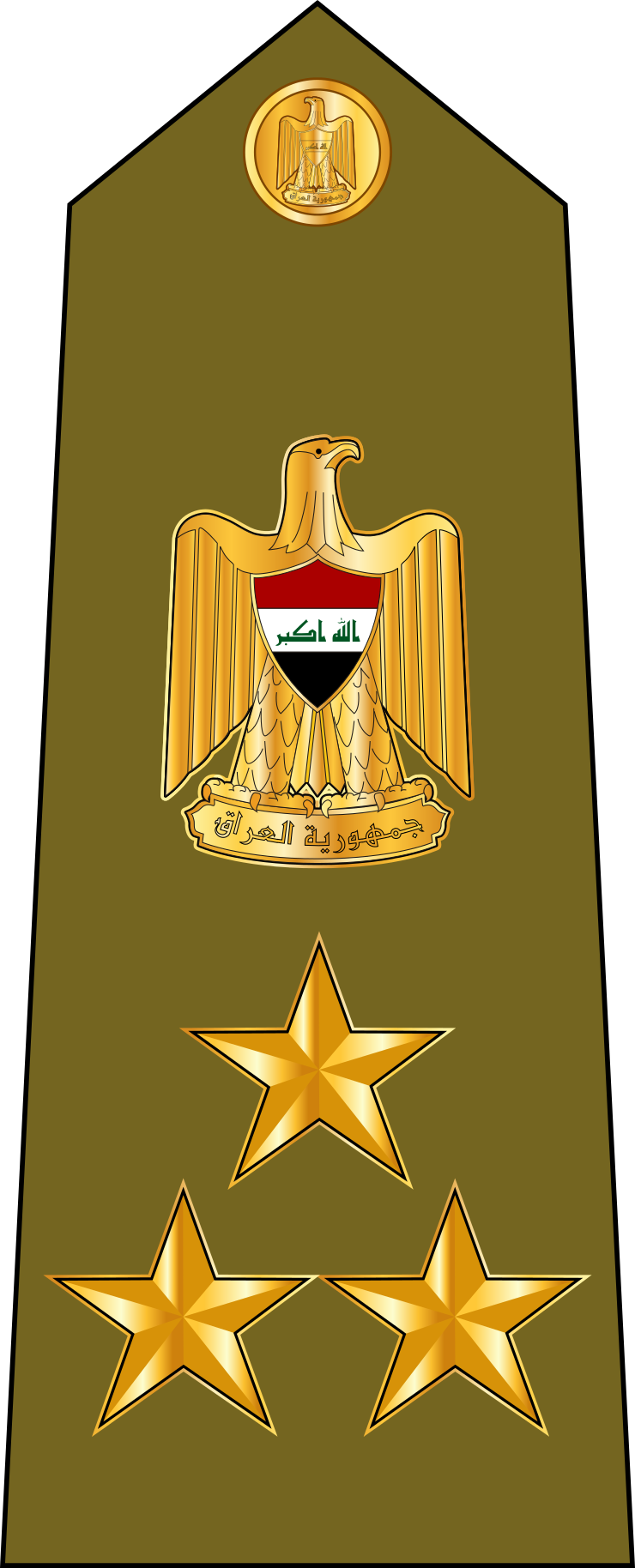
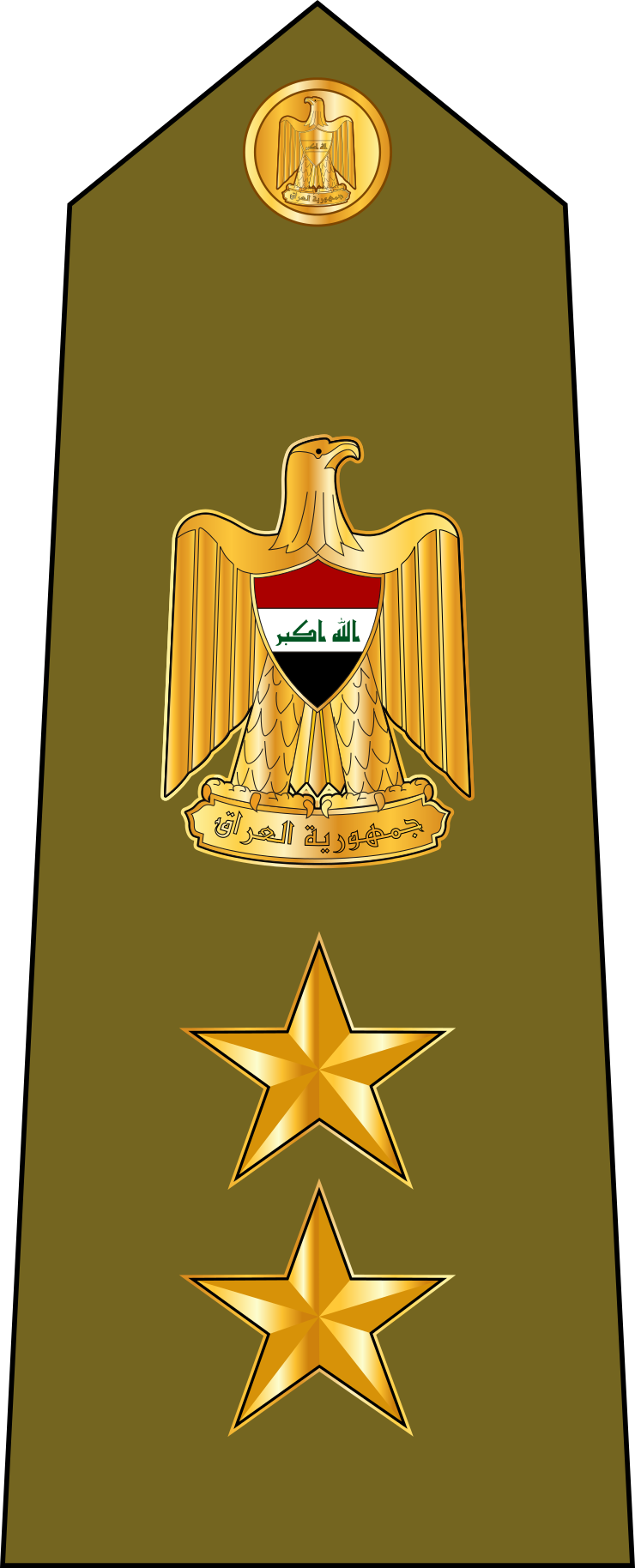
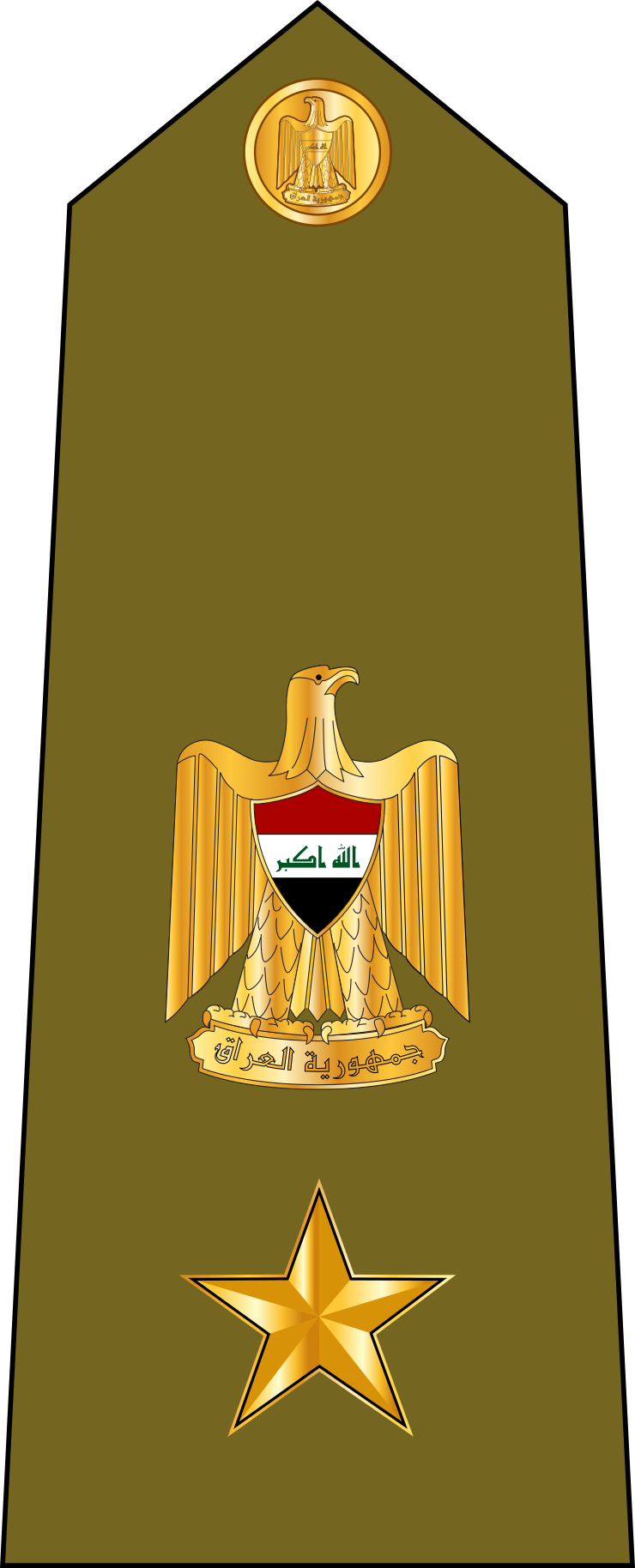
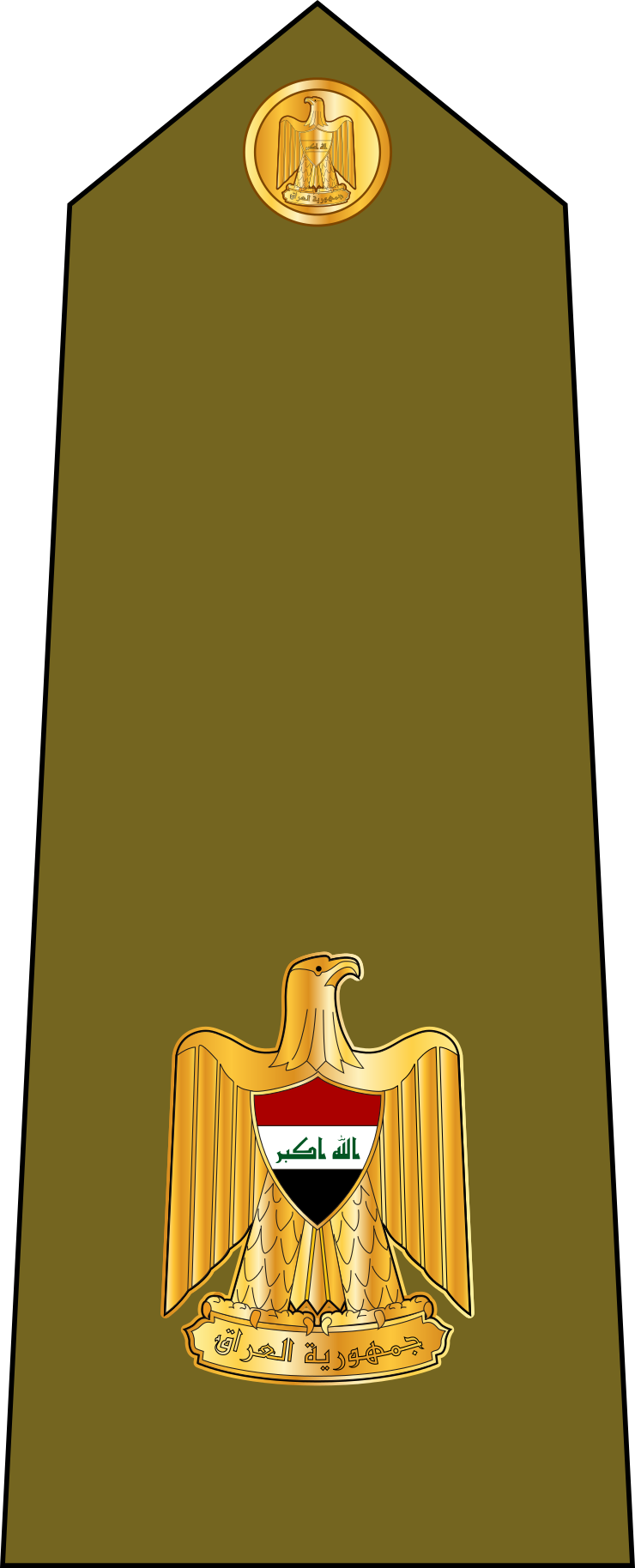
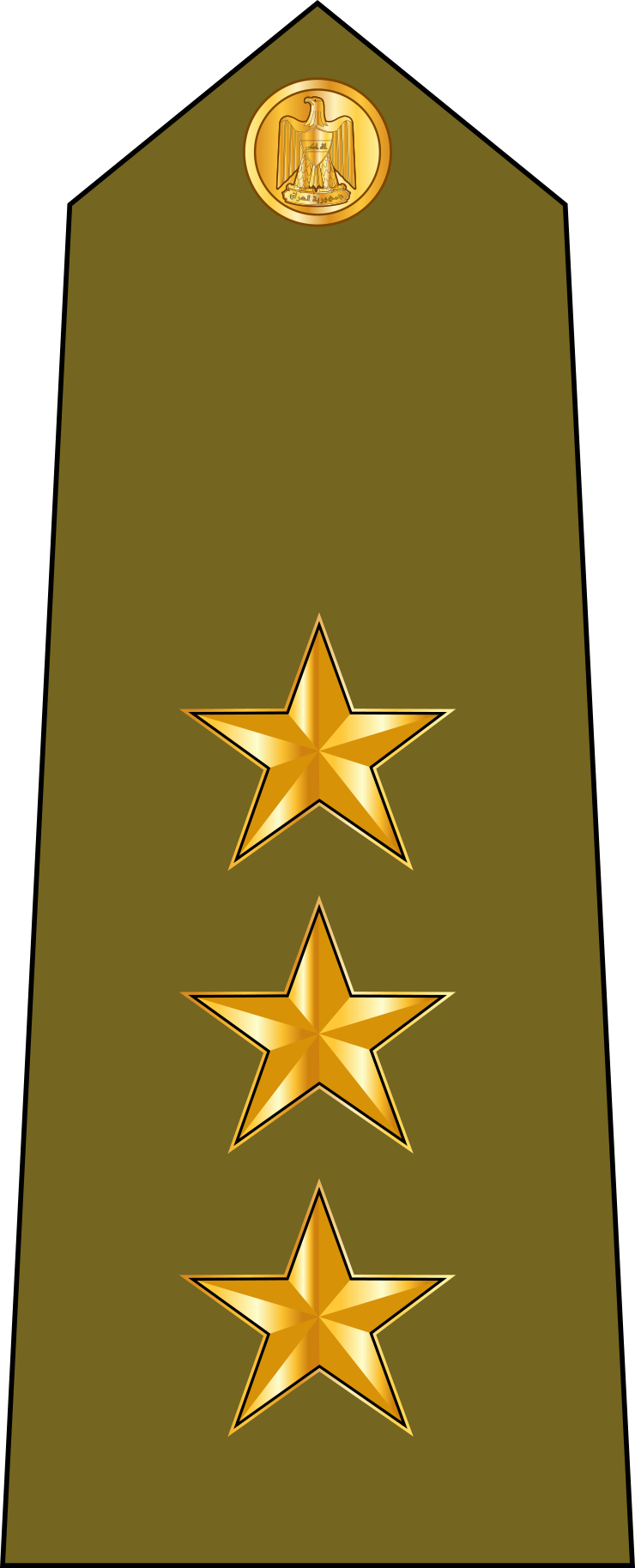
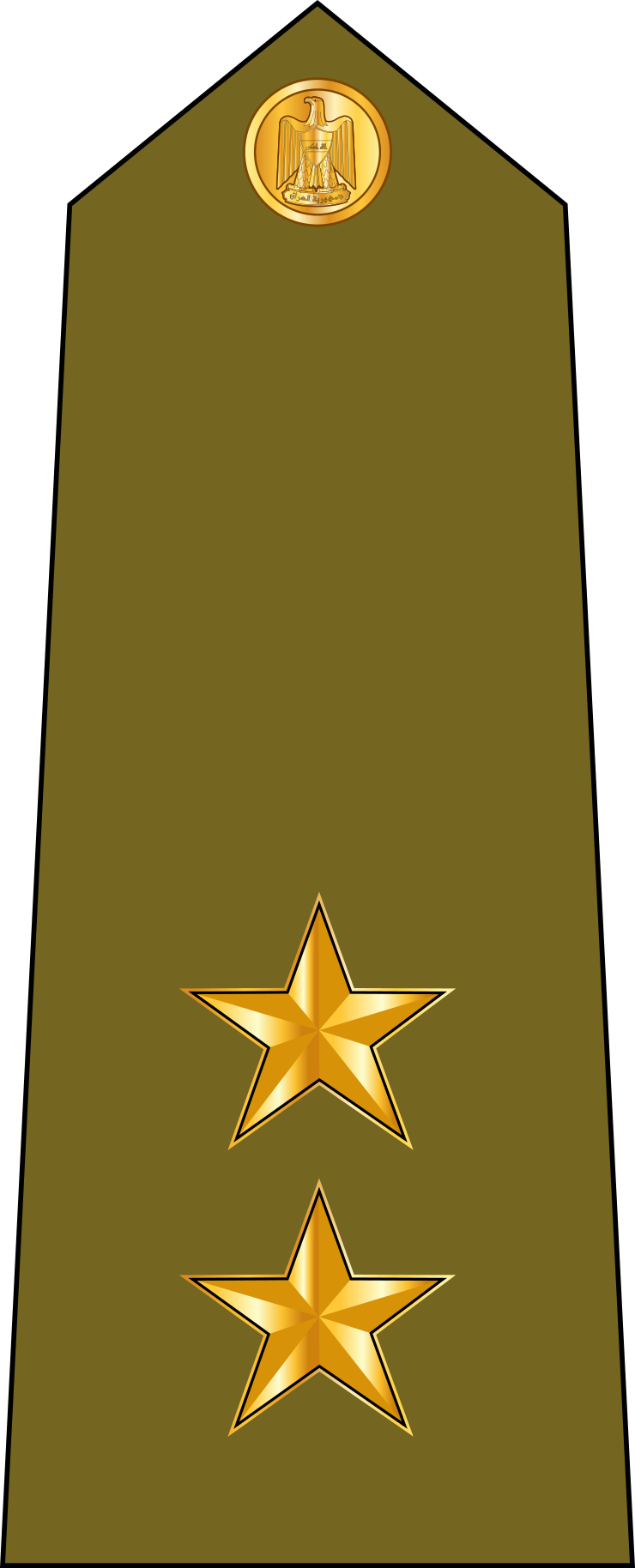
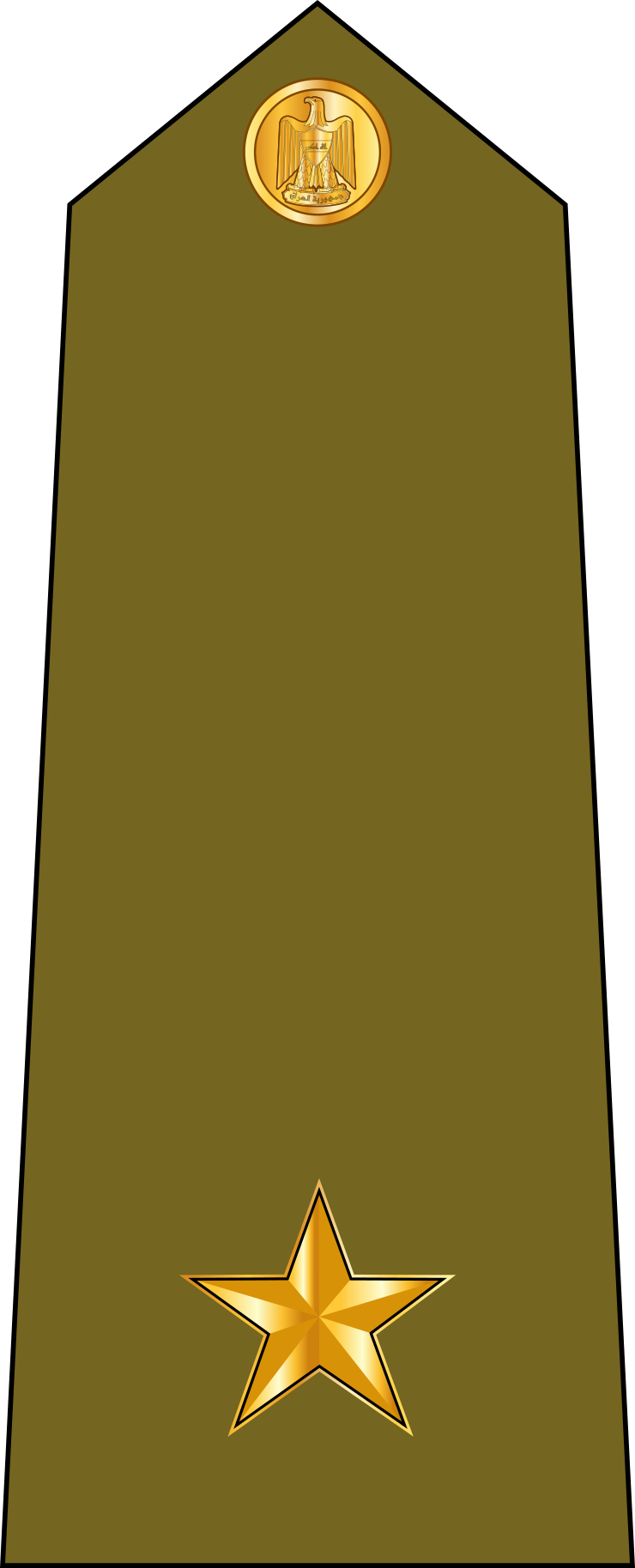
Rank group	General / flag officers					Senior officers			Junior officers
Iraqi Police
Iraqi Police	General	Lieutenant general	Major general	Brigadier	Colonel	Lieutenant colonel	Major	Captain	First lieutenant	Second lieutenant

Warrant officers

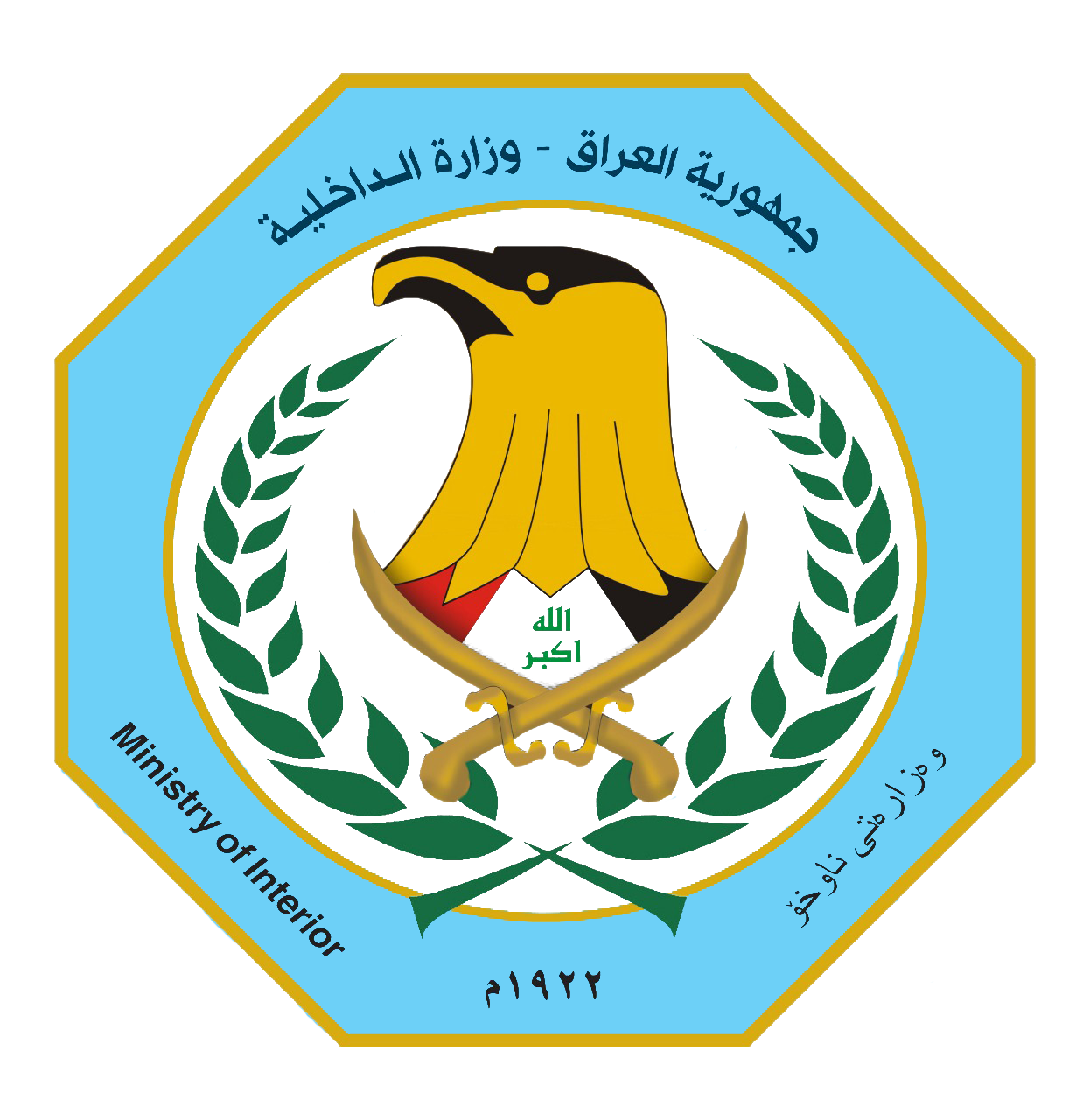
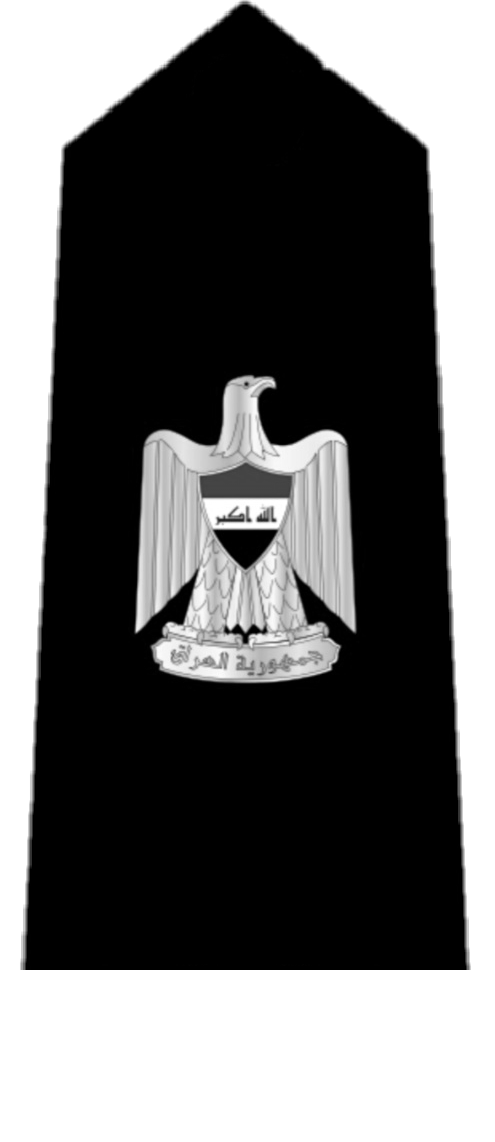
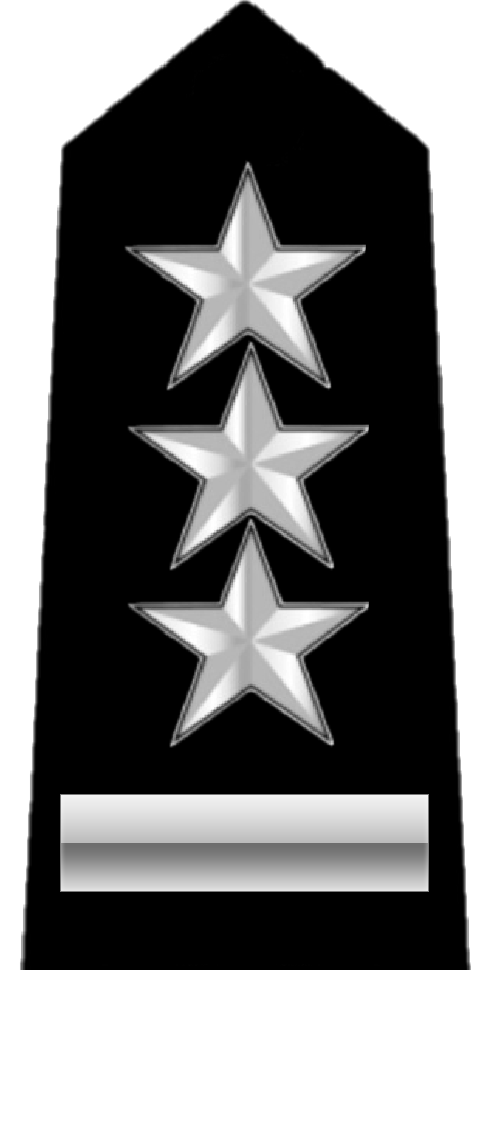
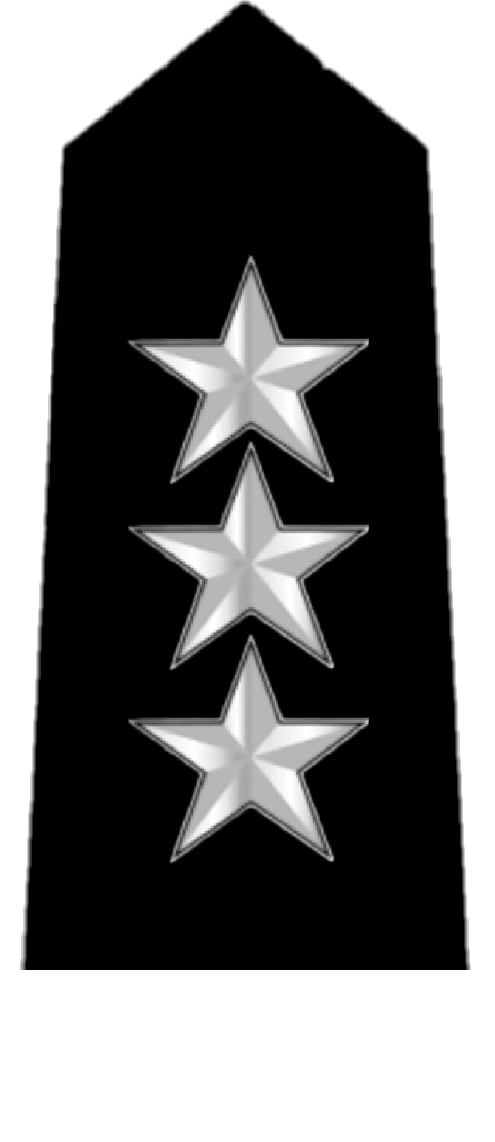
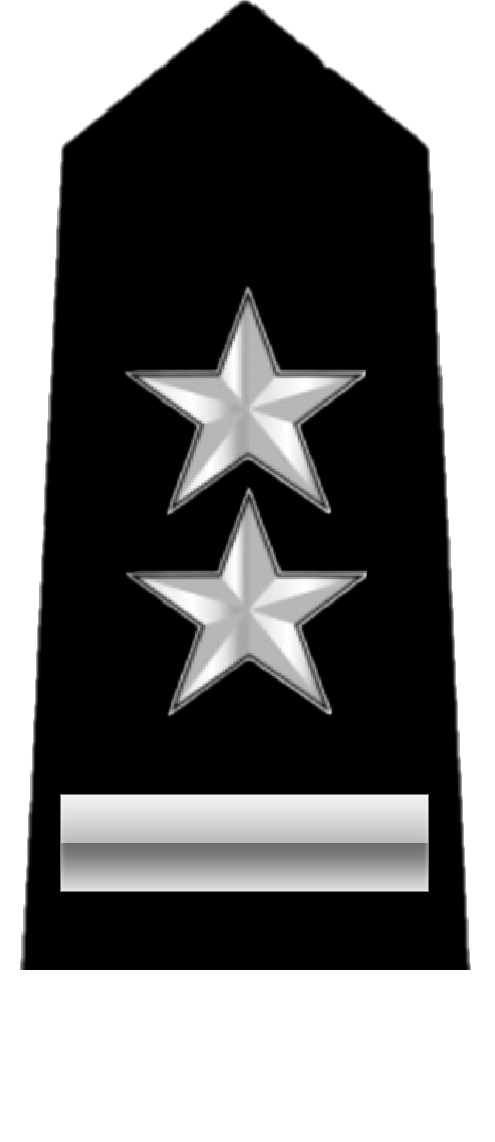
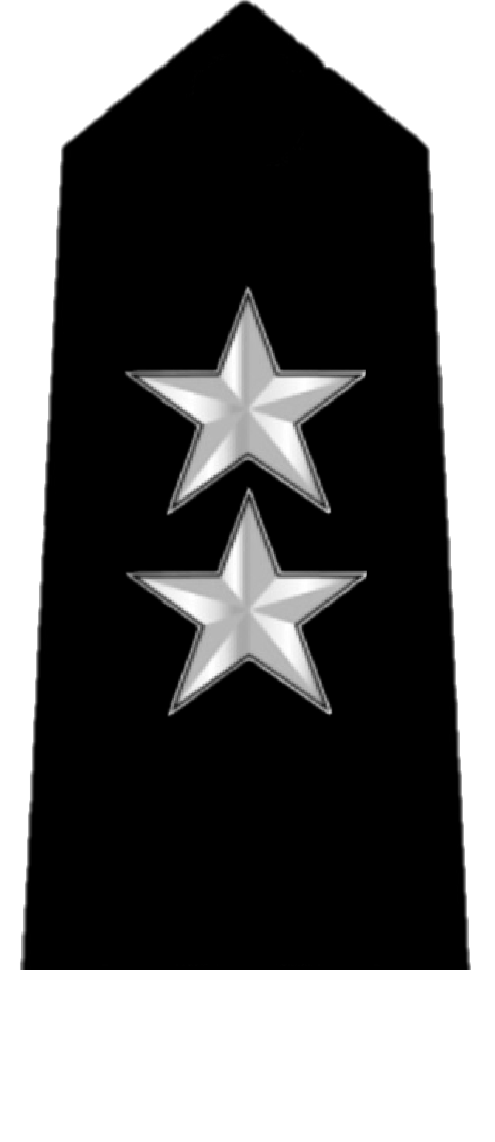
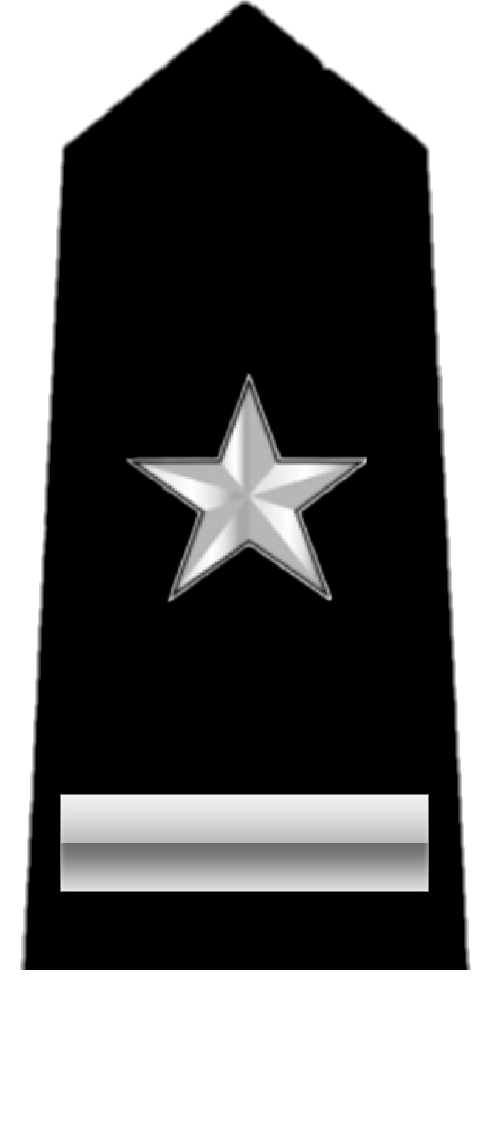
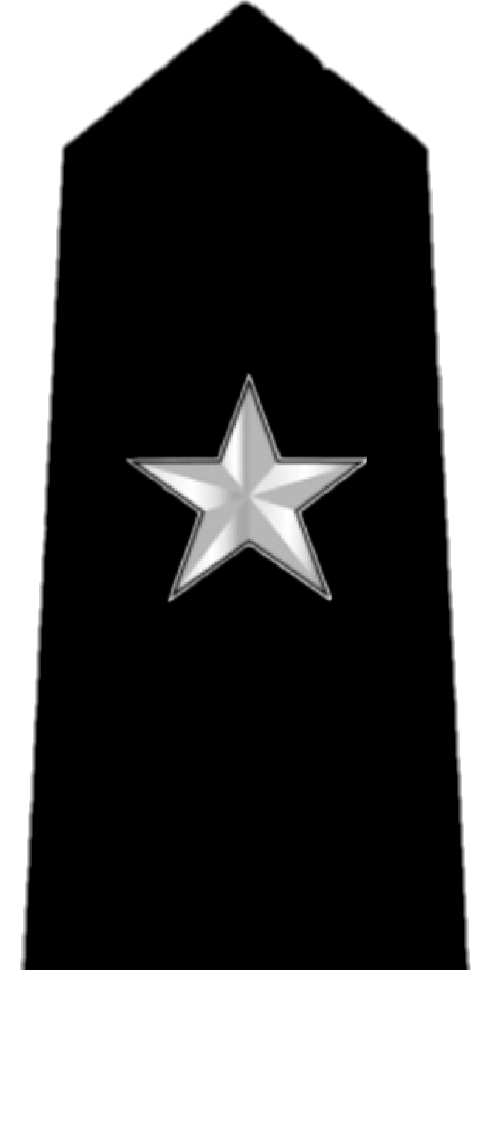
	Warrant officer
Iraqi Police
Iraqi Police	Warrant officer (1st class)	Warrant officer (2nd class)	Warrant officer (3rd class)	Warrant officer (4th class)	Warrant officer (5th class)	Warrant officer (6th class)	Warrant officer (7th class)

Other ranks

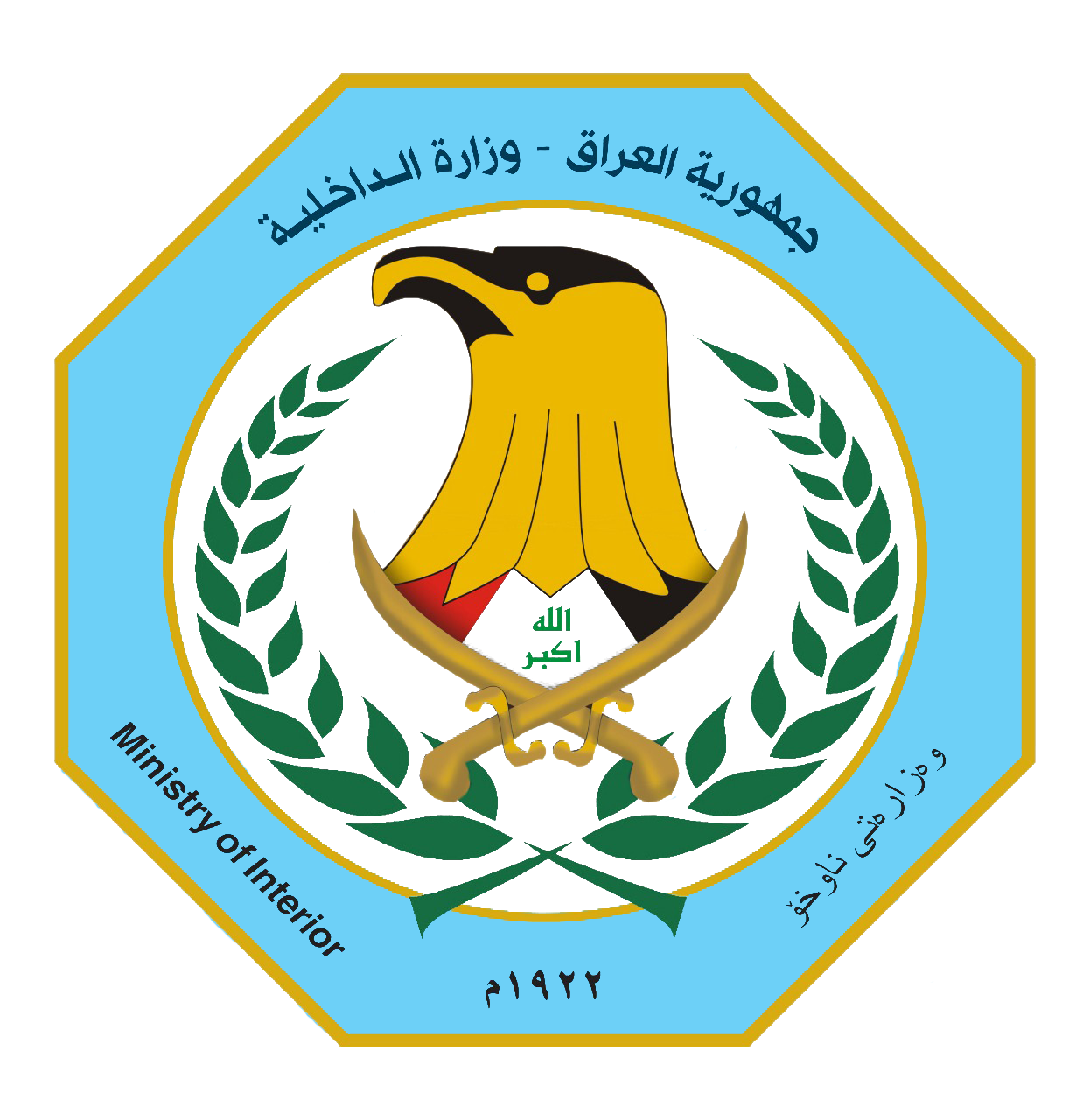
	Constabulary ranks
Iraqi Police
Iraqi Police	Staff sergeant	Sergeant	Corporal	Policeman; 1st class	Policeman

== Israel ==
Officers

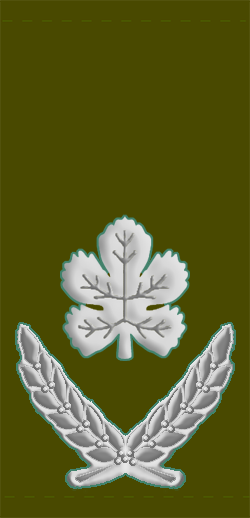
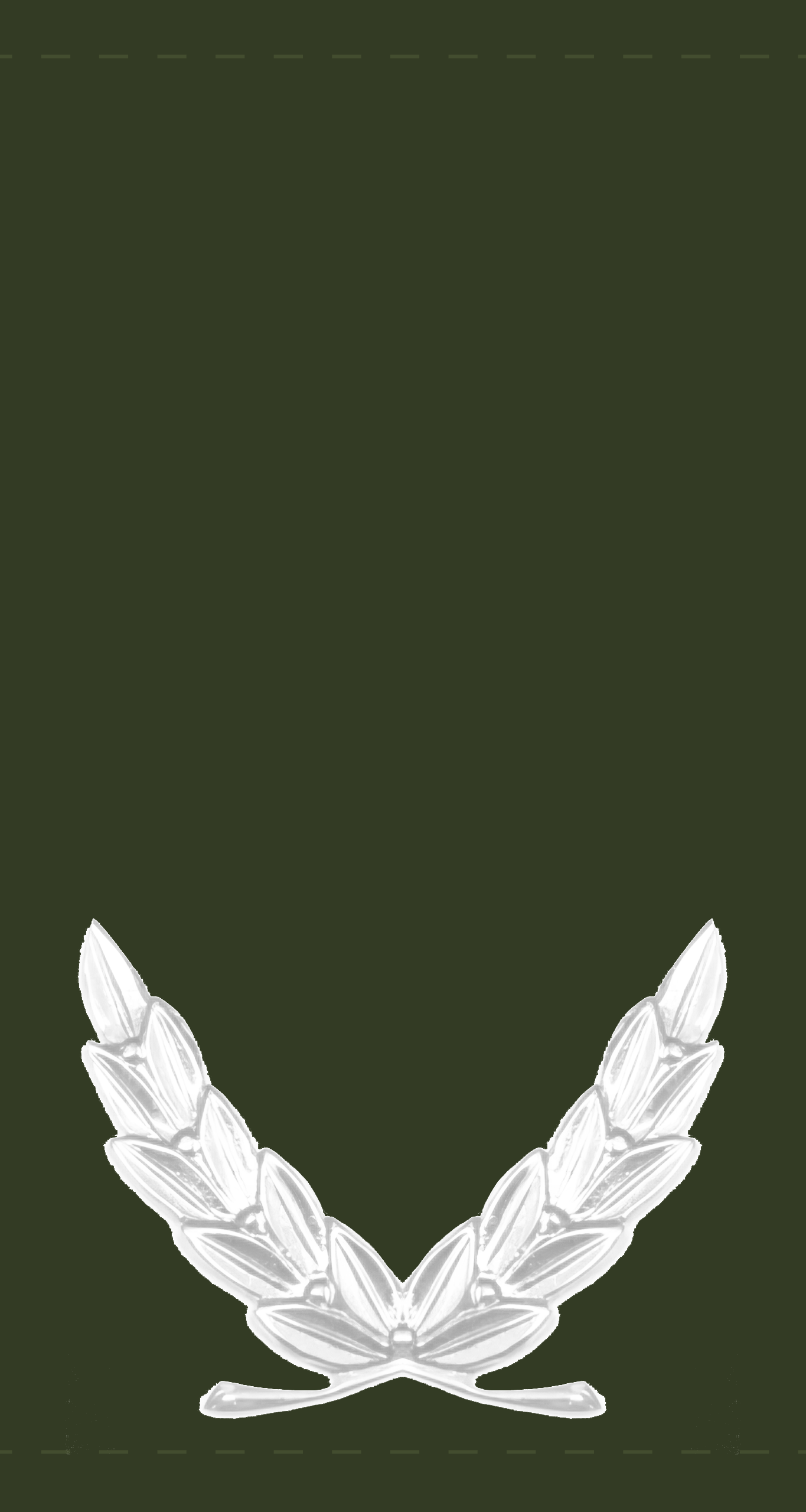
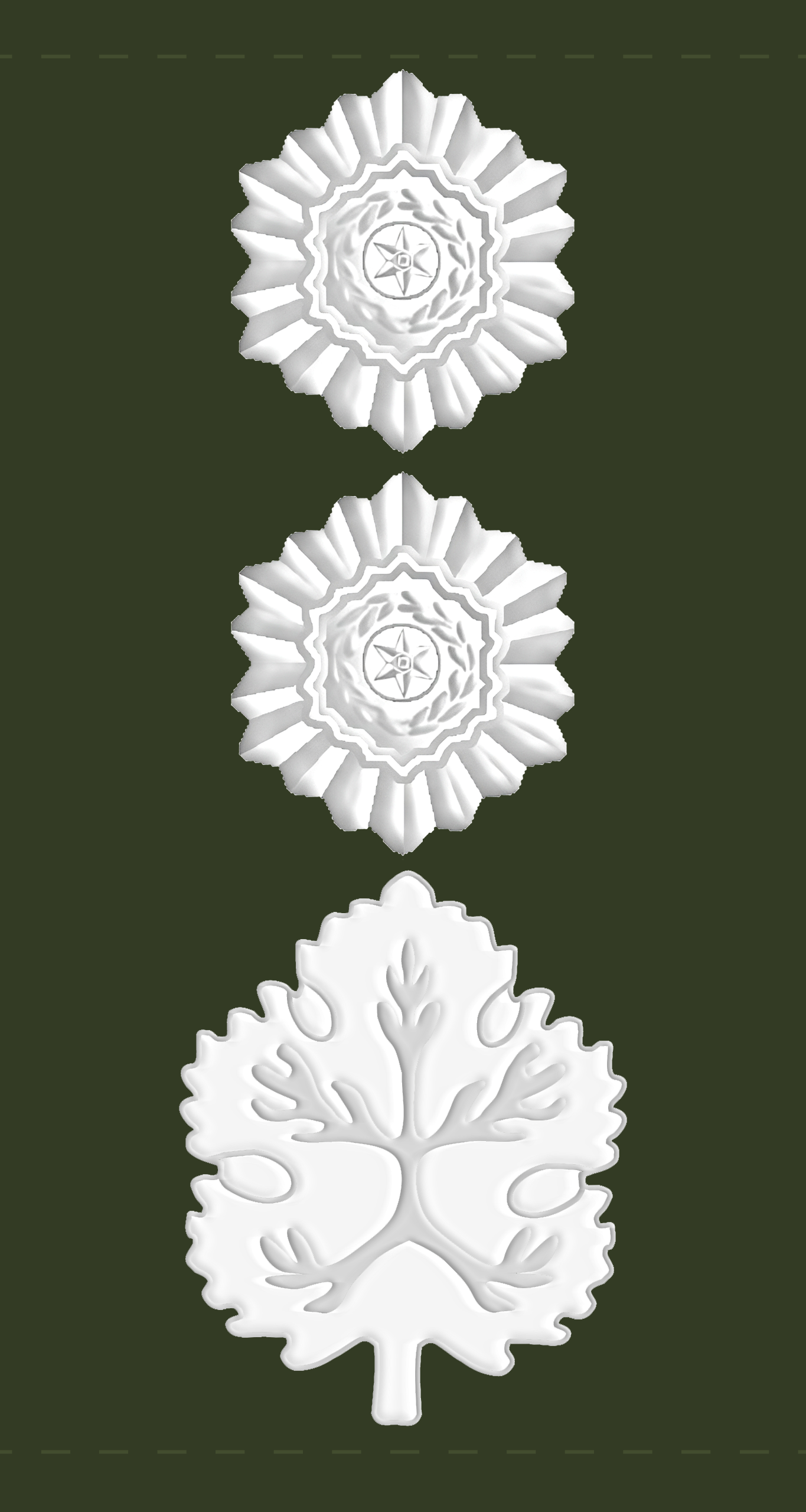
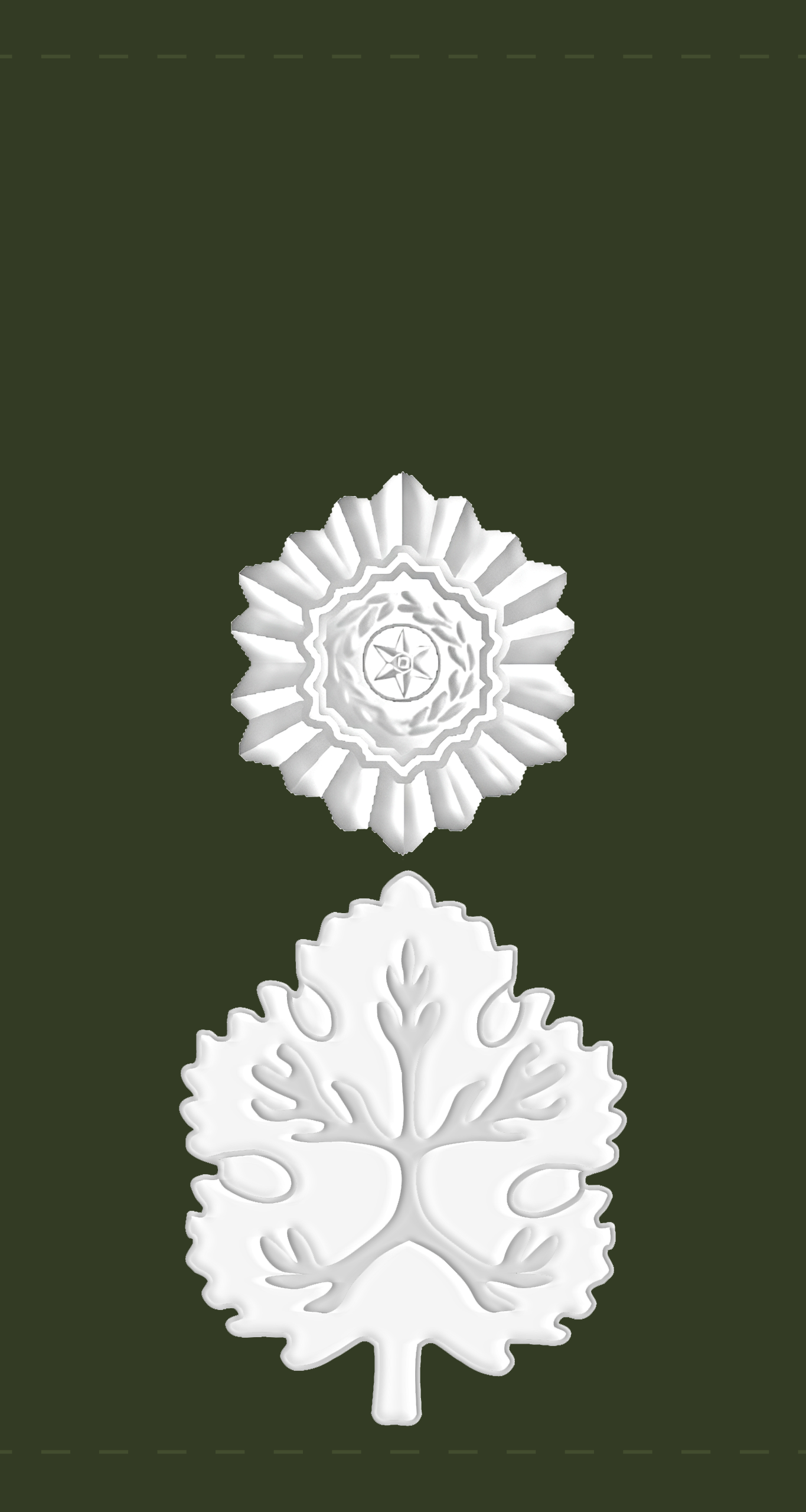
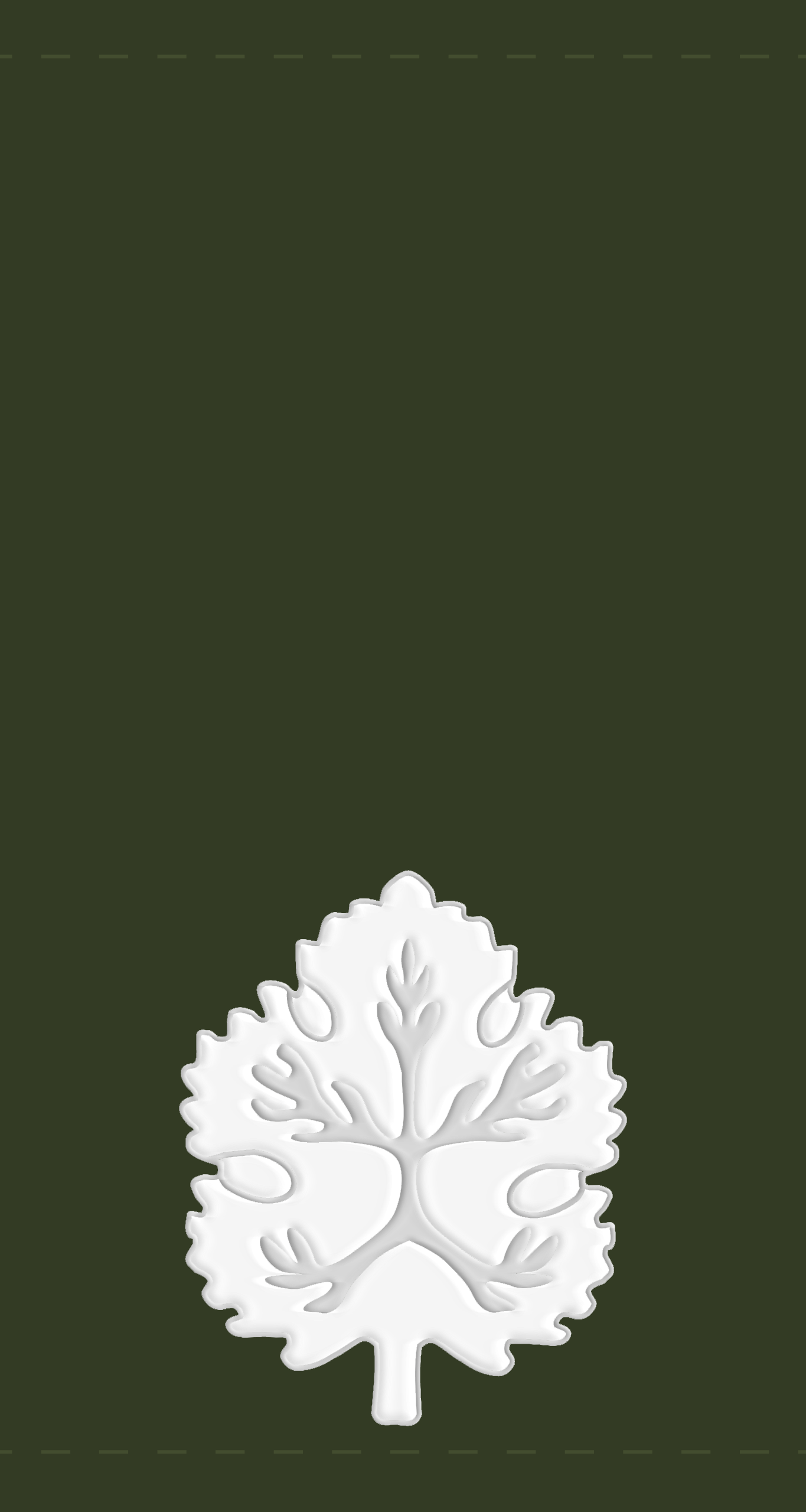
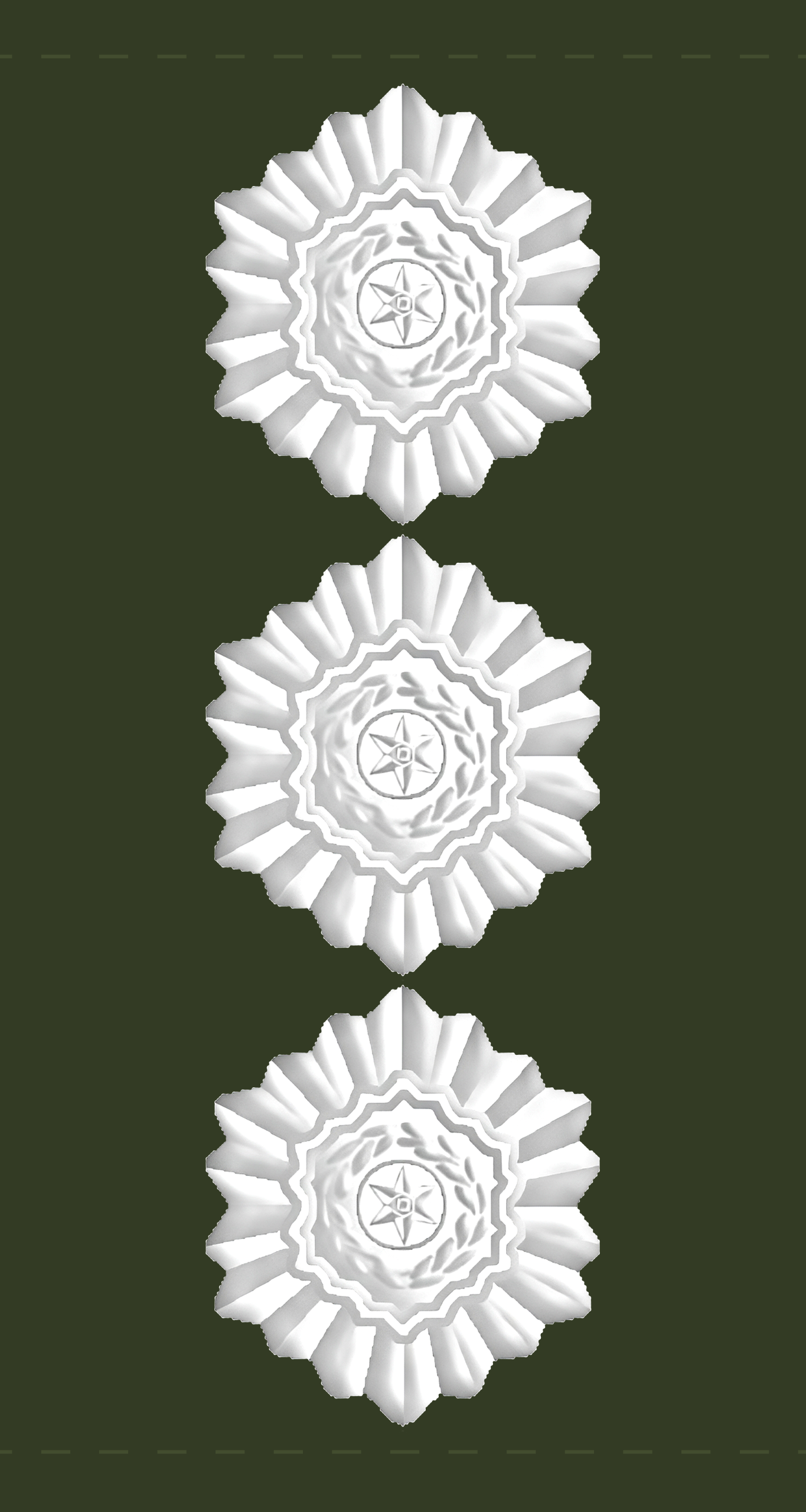
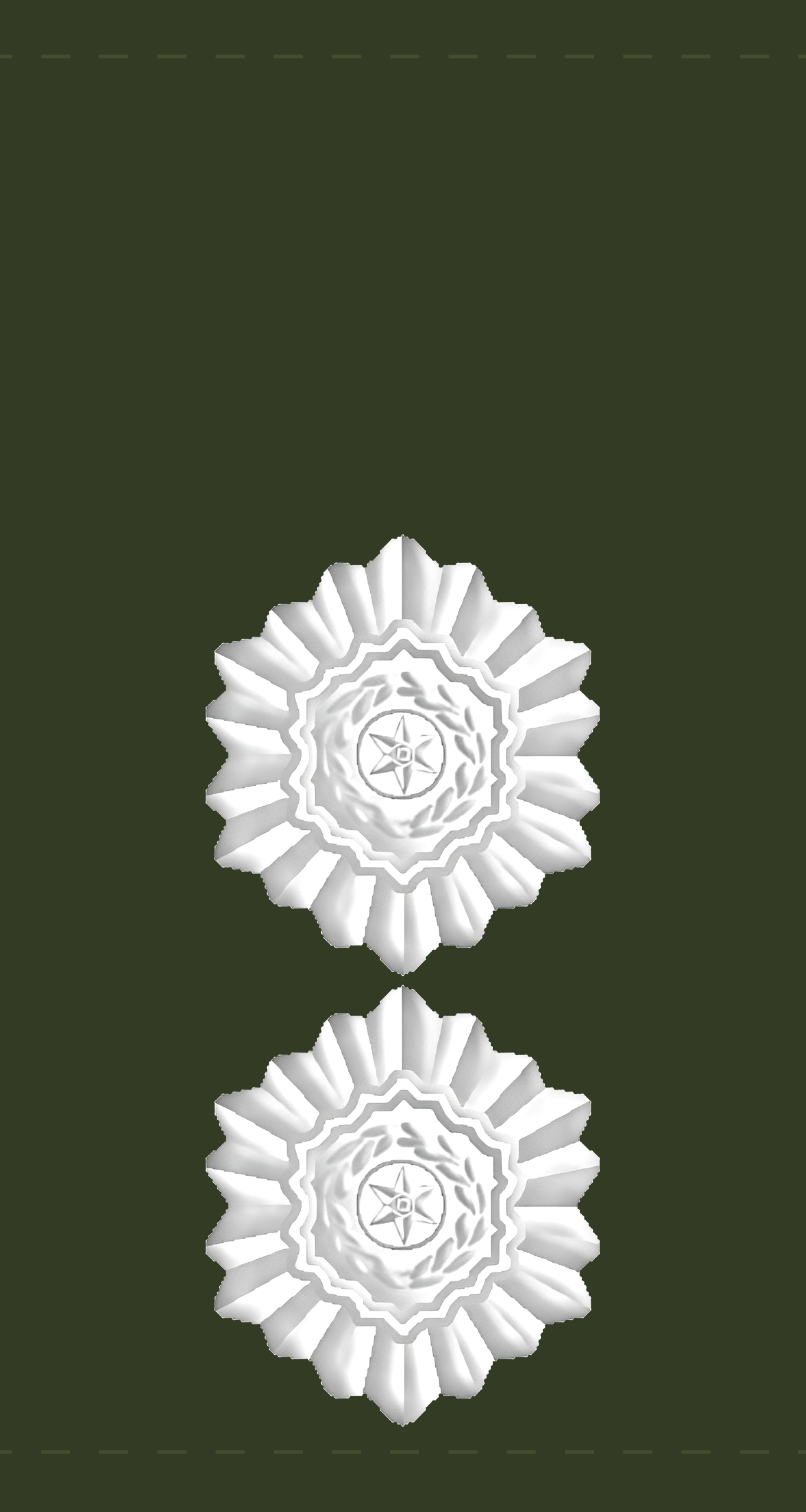
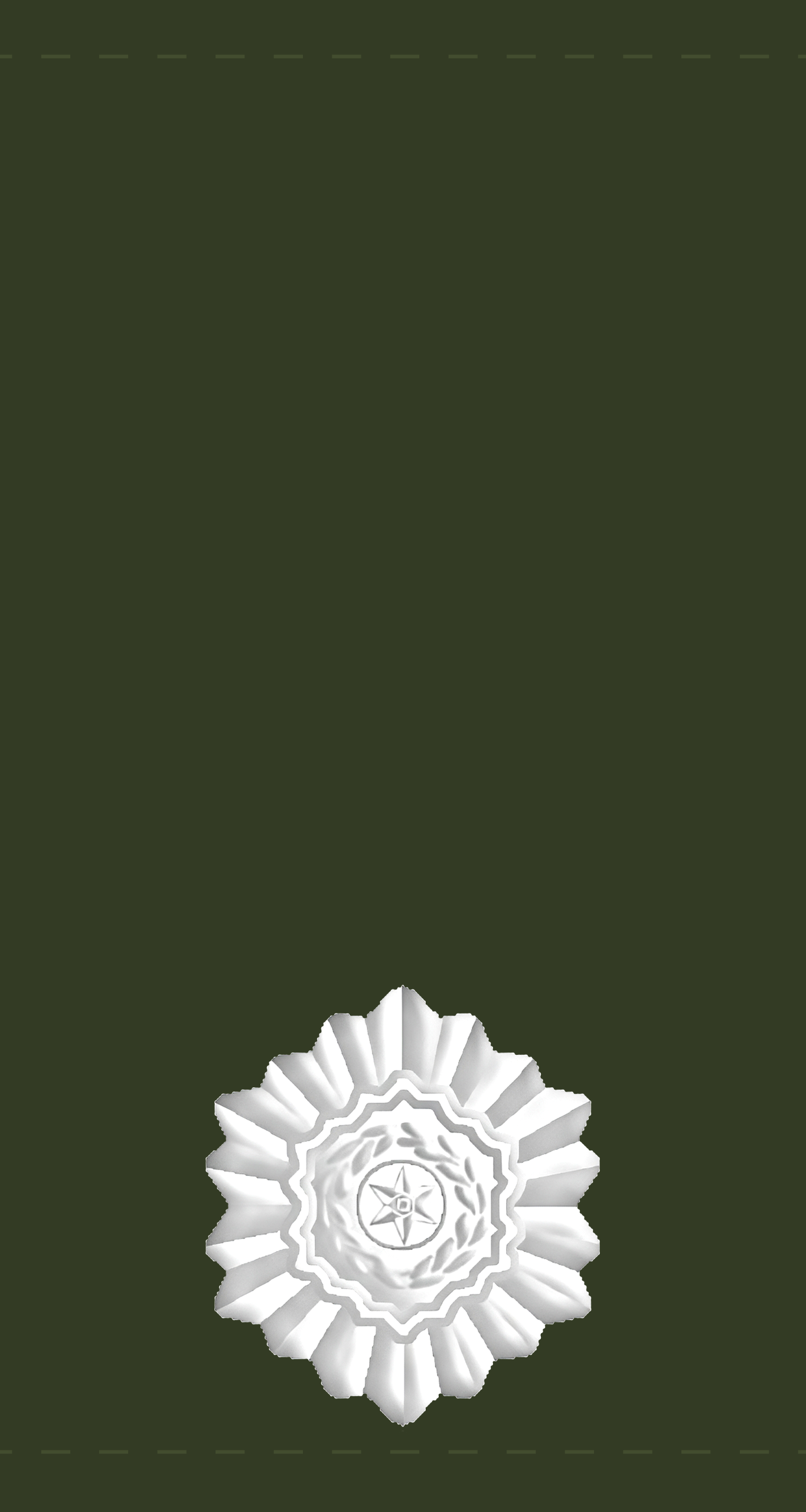
Rank group	General / flag officers			Senior officers			Junior officers
Israel Police
Israel Police	רב ניצב; Rav nitzav	ניצב; Nitzav	תת ניצב; Tat nitzav	ניצב משנה; Nitzav mishneh	סגן ניצב; Sgan nitzav	רב פקד; Rav pakad	פקד; Pakad	מפקח; Mefake'ah	מפקח משנה; Mefake'ah mishneh	צוער; Tzoar
Israel Border Police
Israel Border Police		ניצב; Nitzav	תת ניצב; Tat nitzav	ניצב משנה; Nitzav mishneh	סגן ניצב; Sgan nitzav	רב פקד; Rav pakad	פקד; Pakad	מפקח; Mefake'ah	מפקח משנה; Mefake'ah mishneh
English	Commissioner	Deputy commissioner	Assistant commissioner	Commander	Chief superintendent	Superintendent	Chief inspector	Inspector	Sub-inspector	Officer cadet

Others

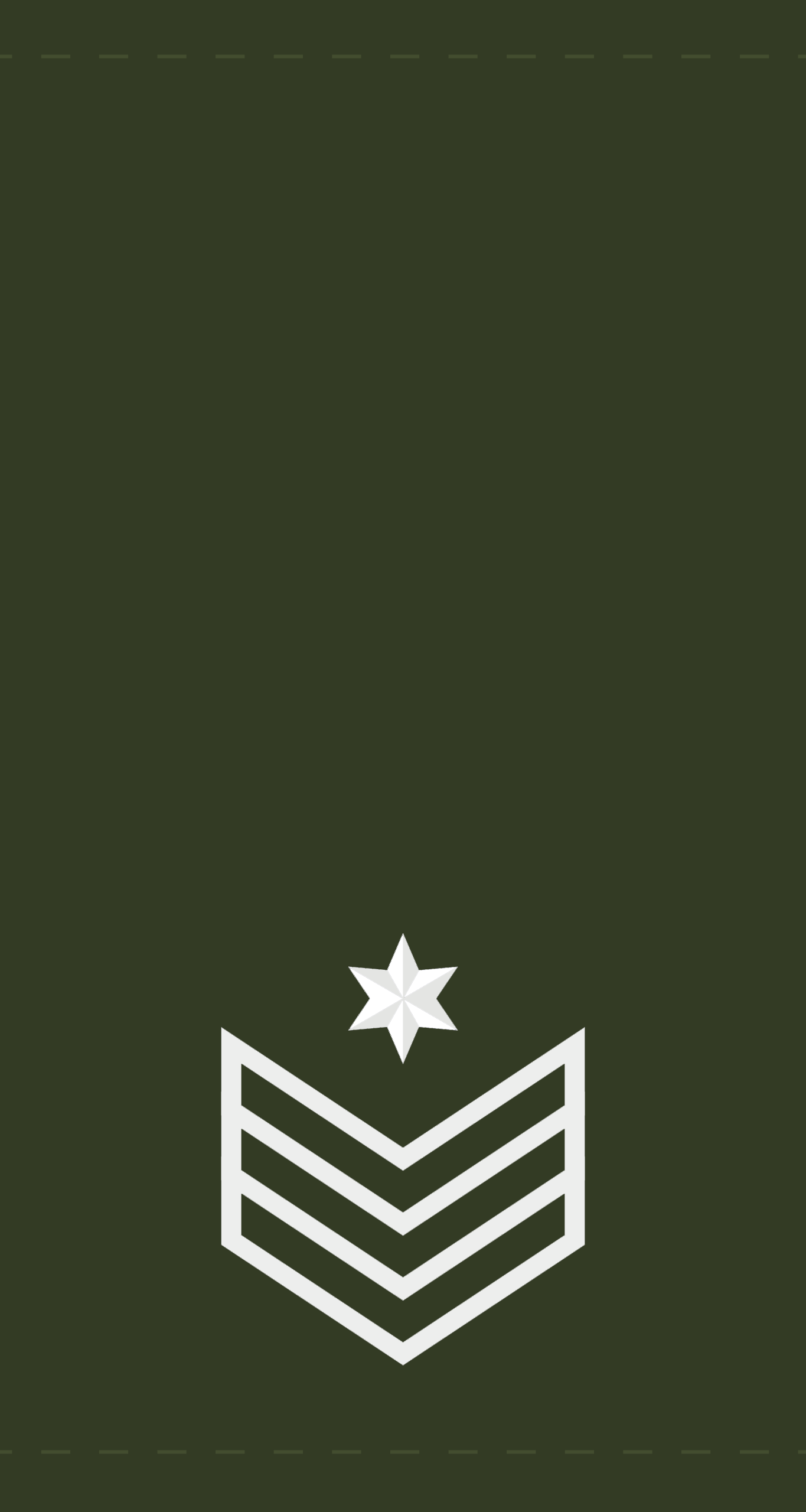
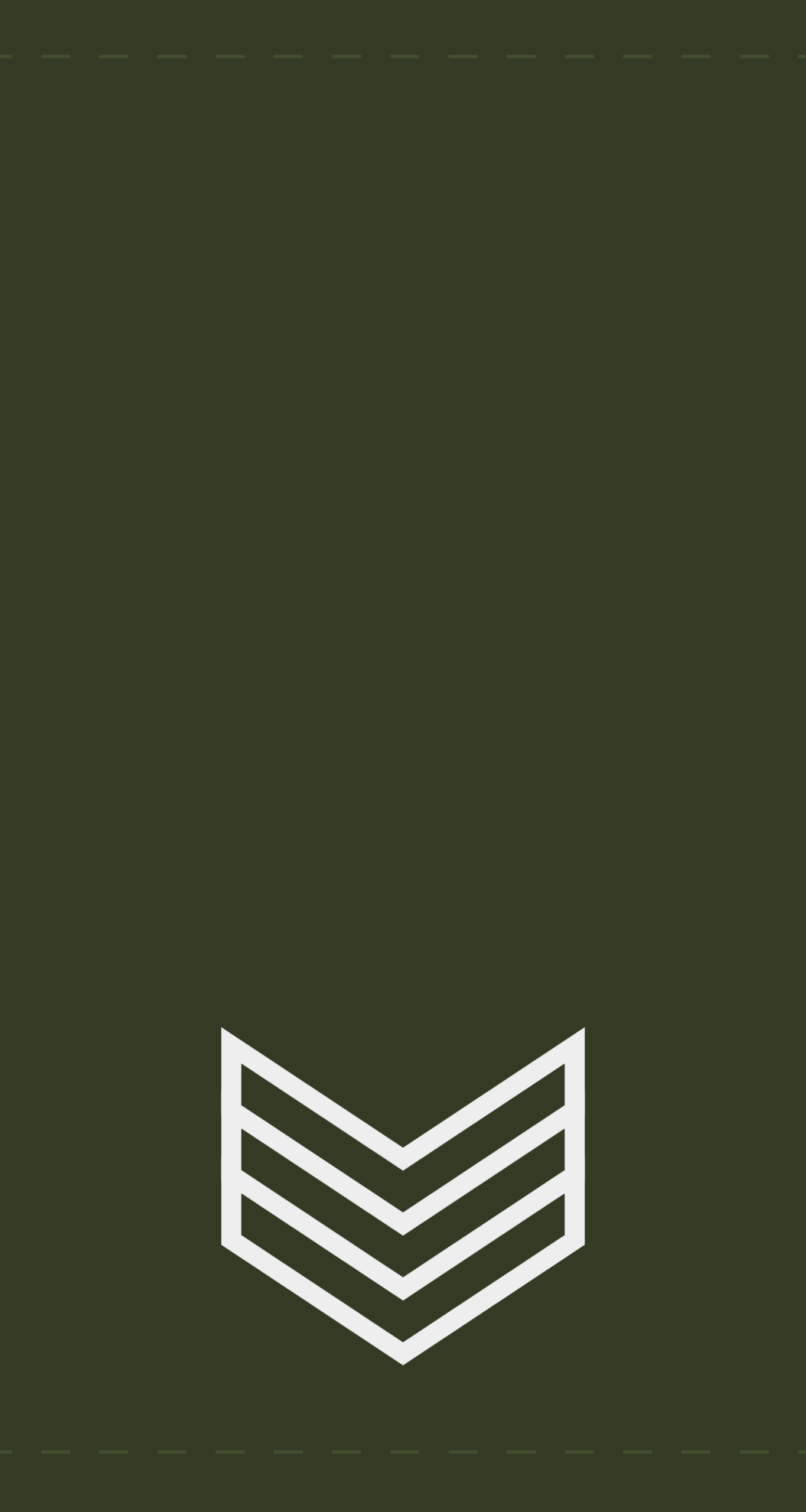
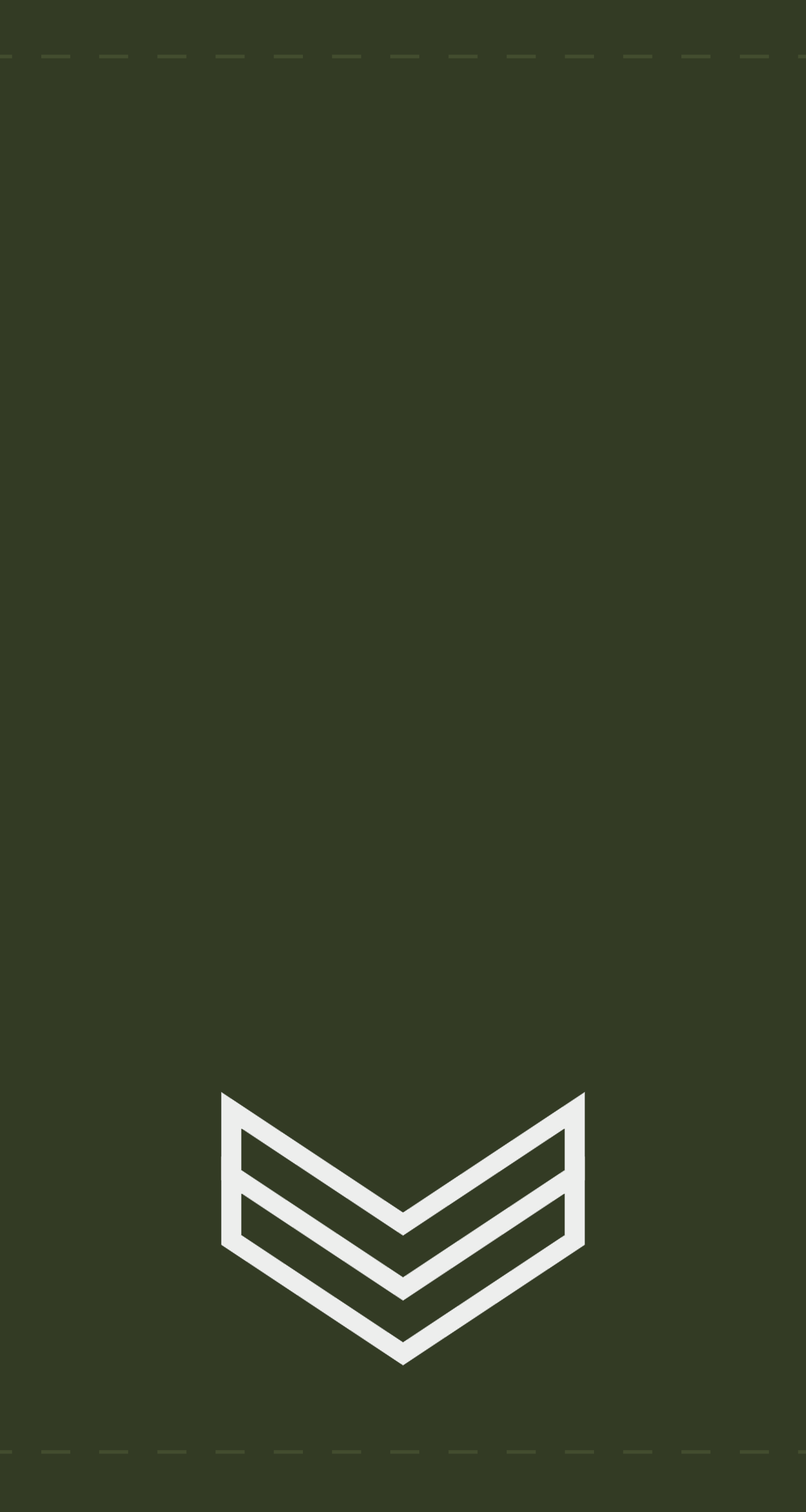
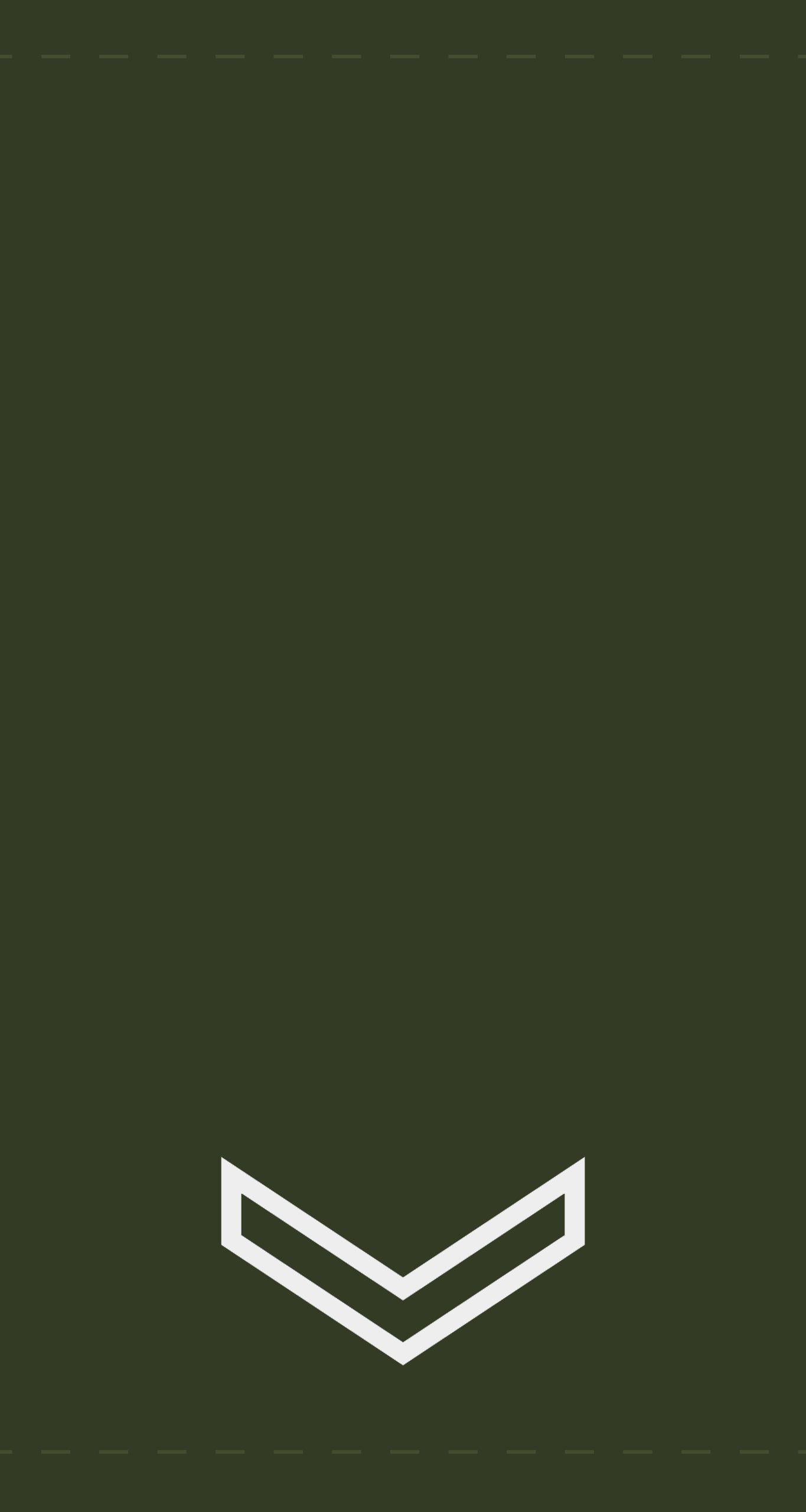
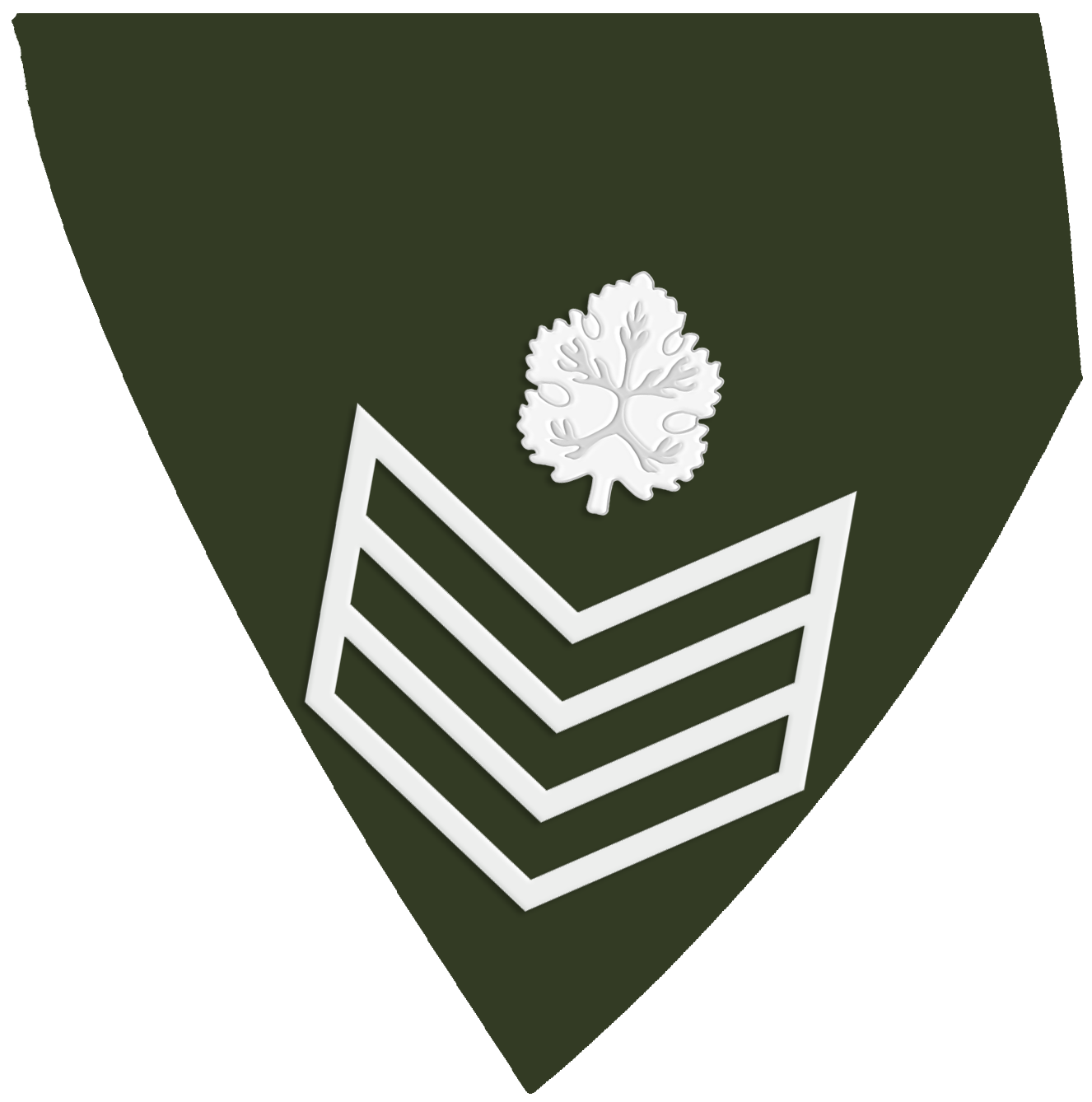
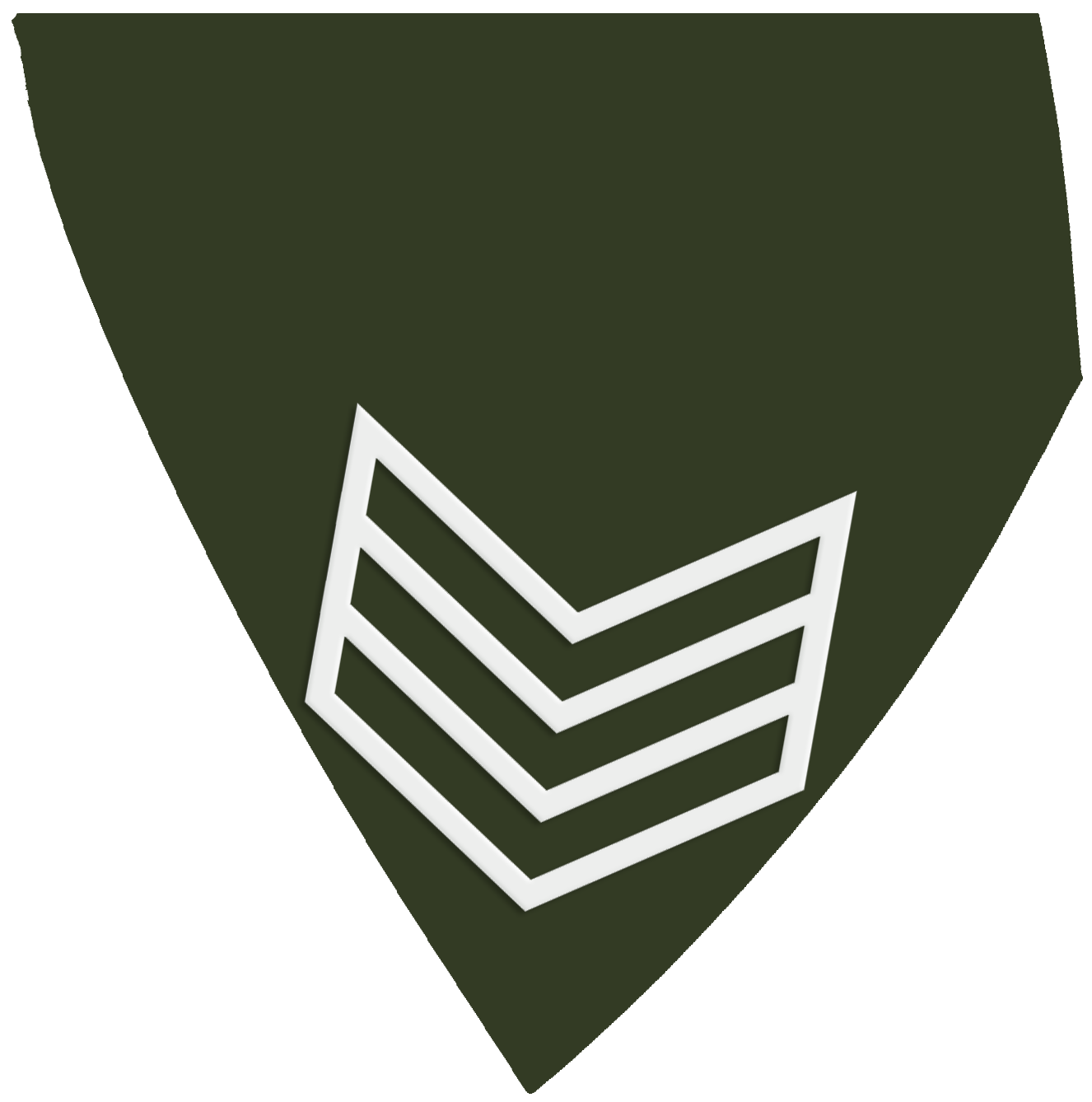
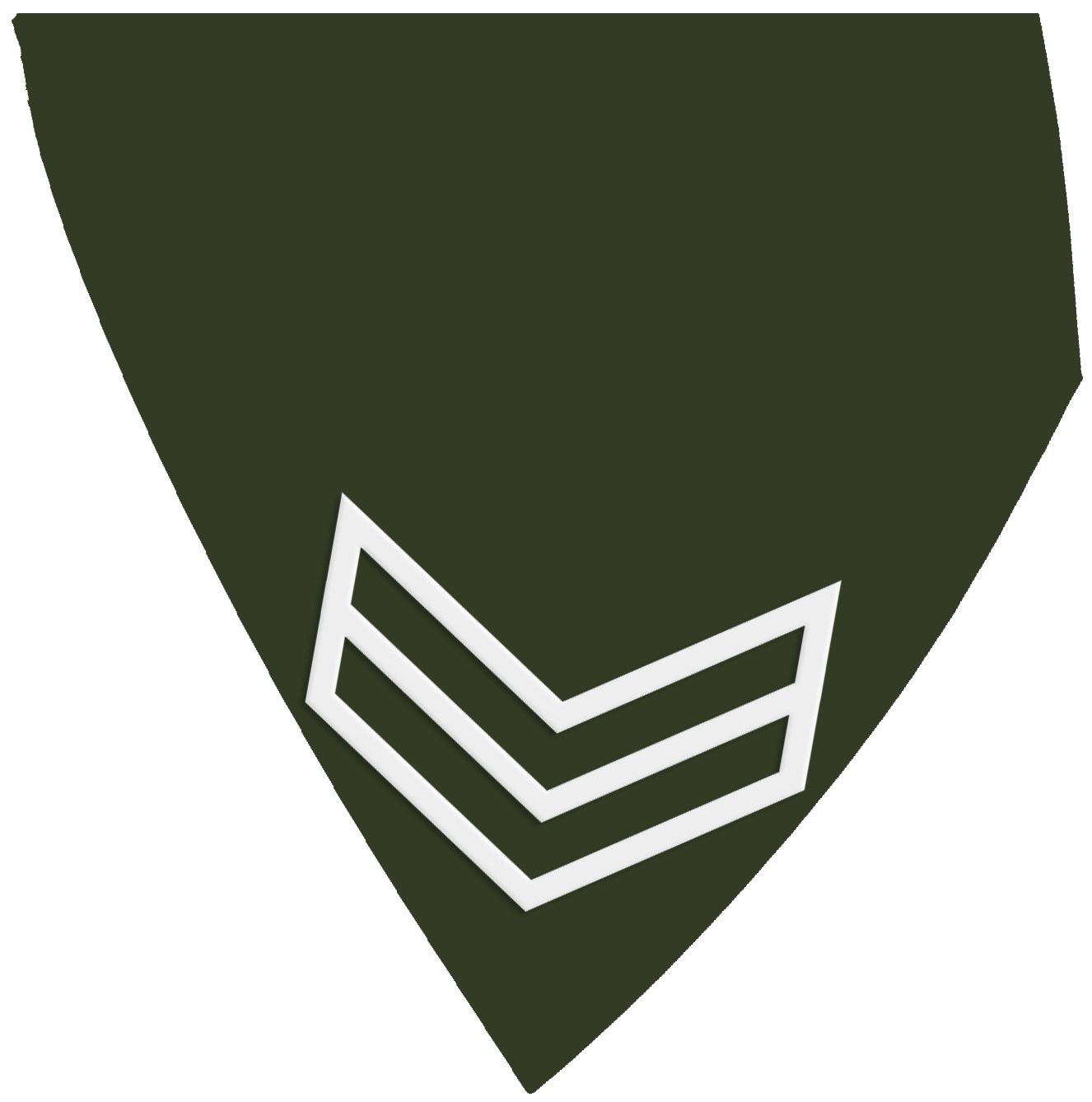
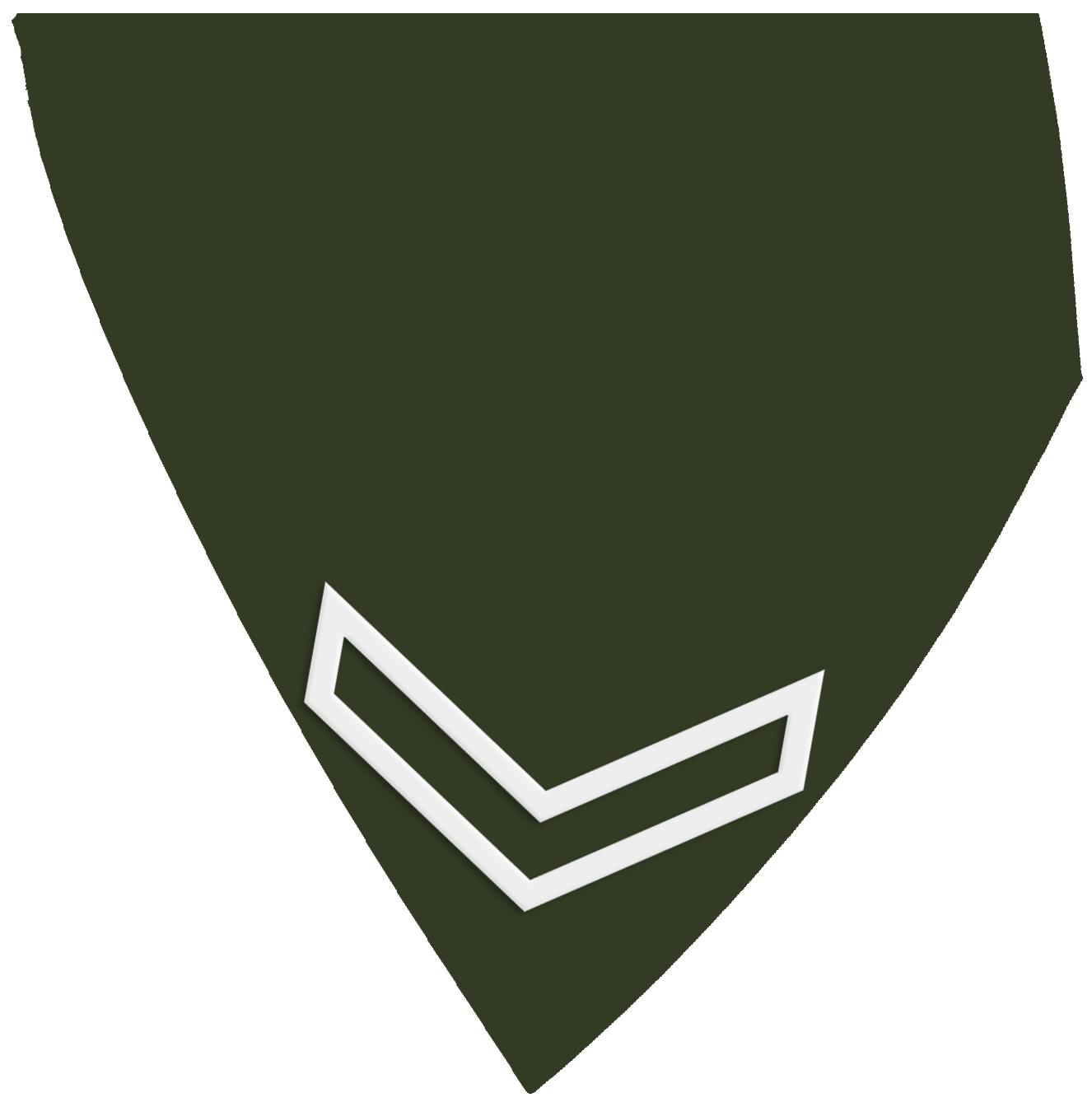
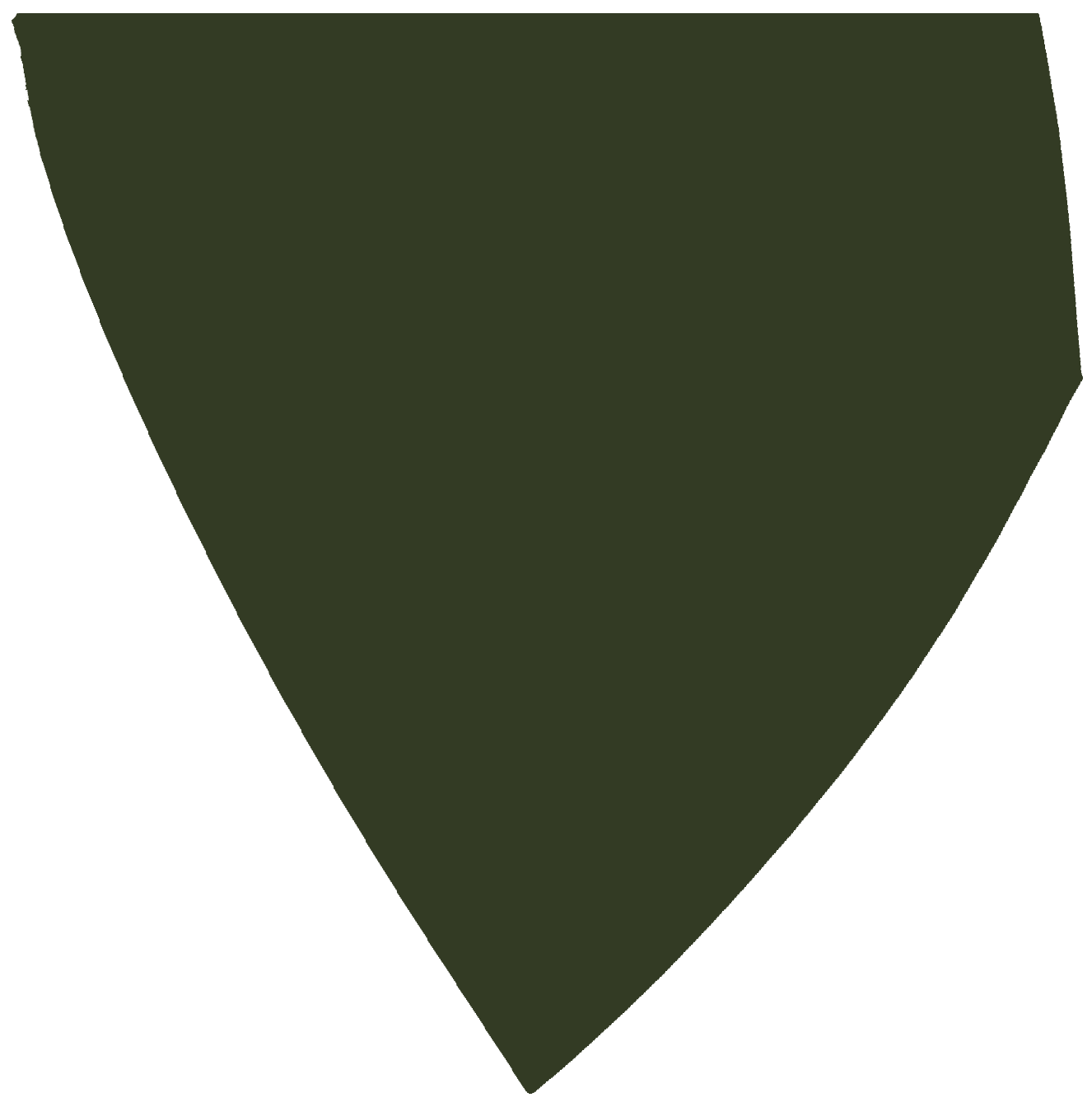
Rank group	Senior NCOs							Junior NCOs	Enlisted
Israel Police
Israel Police	רב נגד; Rav nagad	רב סמל בכיר; Rav samal bakhir	רב סמל מתקדם; Rav samal mitkadem	רב סמל ראשון; Rav samal rishon	רב סמל; Rav samal	סמל ראשון; Samal rishon	סמל שני; Samal sheni	רב שוטר; Rav shoter	שוטר; Shoter
Israel Border Police
Israel Border Police	רב נגד; Rav nagad	רב סמל בכיר; Rav samal bakhir	רב סמל מתקדם; Rav samal mitkadem	רב סמל ראשון; Rav samal rishon	רב סמל; Rav samal	סמל ראשון; Samal rishon	סמל שני; Samal sheni	רב שוטר; Rav shoter	שוטר; Shoter
English	Station sergeant major	Sergeant major	First sergeant	Master sergeant	Sergeant first class	Staff sergeant	Sergeant	Corporal	Constable

== Japan ==
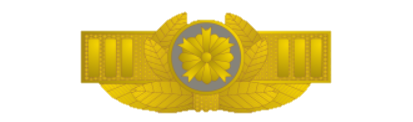
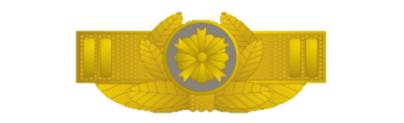
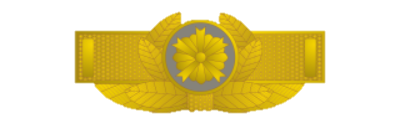
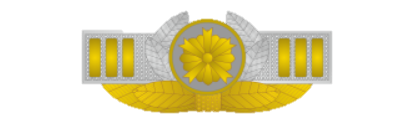
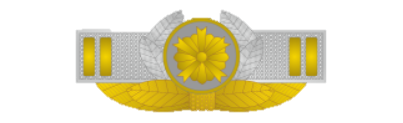
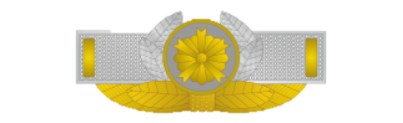
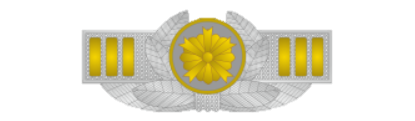
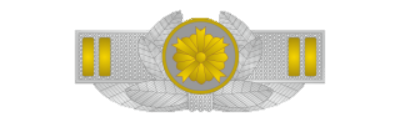
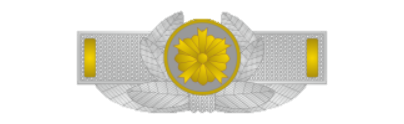
Insignia	Name	English	Notes
	警察庁長官 (Keisatsu-chō Chōkan)	Commissioner general	The chief of the National Police Agency. The rank outside. Single capacity.
	警視総監 (Keishi-sōkan)	Superintendent general	The chief of the Tokyo Metropolitan Police Department. Single capacity.
	警視監 (Keishi-kan)	Senior commissioner	Deputy commissioner general, deputy superintendent general, chief of the regional police bureau, chief of the prefectural police headquarters, others.
	警視長 (Keishi-chō)	Commissioner	The chief of the prefectural police headquarters
	警視正 (Keishi-sei)	Assistant commissioner	The chief of a police station (large). National police agency officers occupy the ranks above it.
	警視 (Keishi)	Superintendent	The chief of a police station (small or middle), vice commanding officer of a police station, commander of a riot unit.
	警部 (Keibu)	Police chief inspector	Squad commander of a police station, leader of a riot company
	警部補 (Keibu-ho)	Inspector	Squad sub-commander of a police station, leader of a riot platoon. national police officers 1st class's careers start from this rank.
	巡査部長 (Junsa-buchō)	Sergeant	Field supervisor, leader of police box. National police officers 2nd class's careers start from this rank.
	巡査長 (Junsa-chō)	Senior police officer	Honorary rank of police officer
	巡査 (Junsa)	Police officer	Prefectural police officers' careers start from this rank

== South Korea ==
Ranks:

Insignia	Name	English
	치안총감, 治安總監	Commissioner general*
	치안정감, 治安正監	Chief superintendent general**
	치안감, 治安監	Senior superintendent general
	경무관, 警務官	Superintendent general
	총경, 總警	Senior superintendent
	경정, 警正	Superintendent
	경감, 警監	Senior inspector
	경위, 警衛	Inspector
	경사, 警査	Assistant inspector
	경장, 警長	Senior police officer
	순경, 巡警	Police officer
*At most one may be appointed at a time
**At most five may be appointed at a time

- Police officer (순경, 巡警)
  - Newly commissioned officers are appointed as policeman assistant (순경시보, 巡警試補) for a one-year probationary period. The uniform and insignia of an assistant are identical to those of a policeman.
- Auxiliary policeman (의경, 義警)
  - Sergeant constable (수경, 首警)
  - Corporal constable (상경, 上警)
  - Private constable first class (일경, 一警)
  - Private constable (이경, 二警)

== Laos ==
Officers

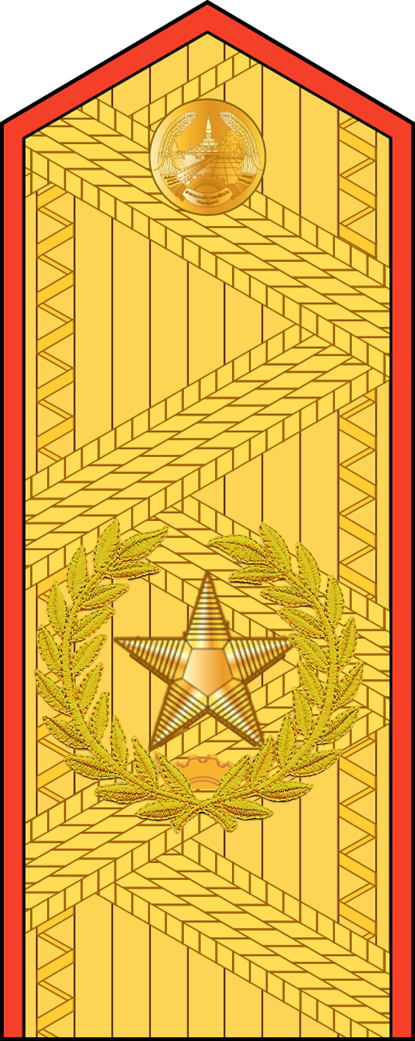
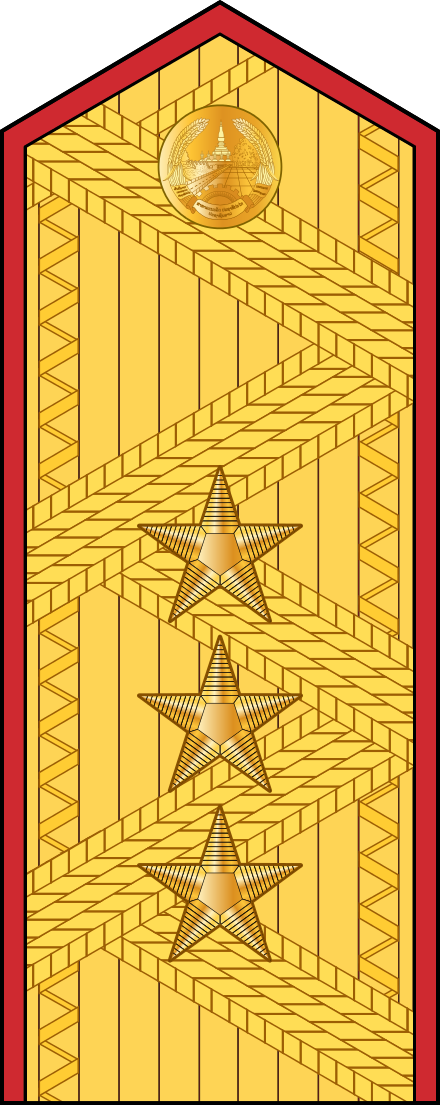
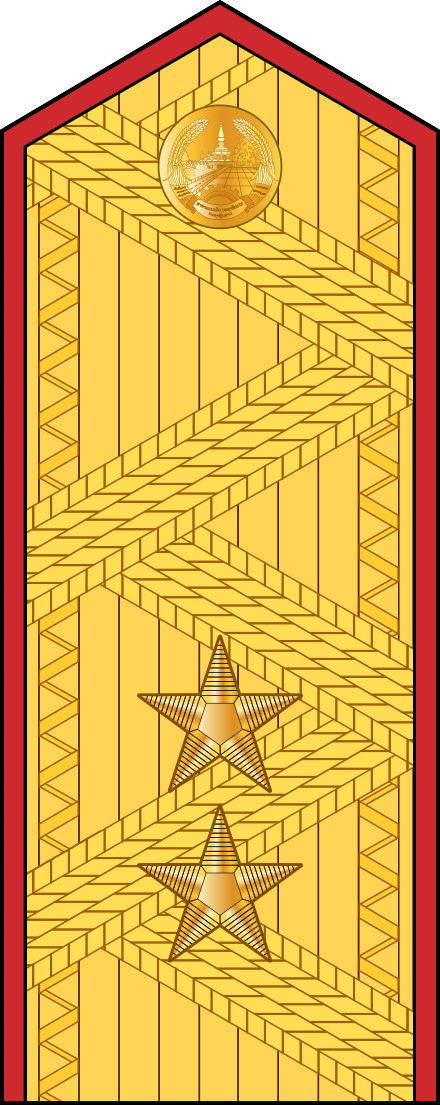
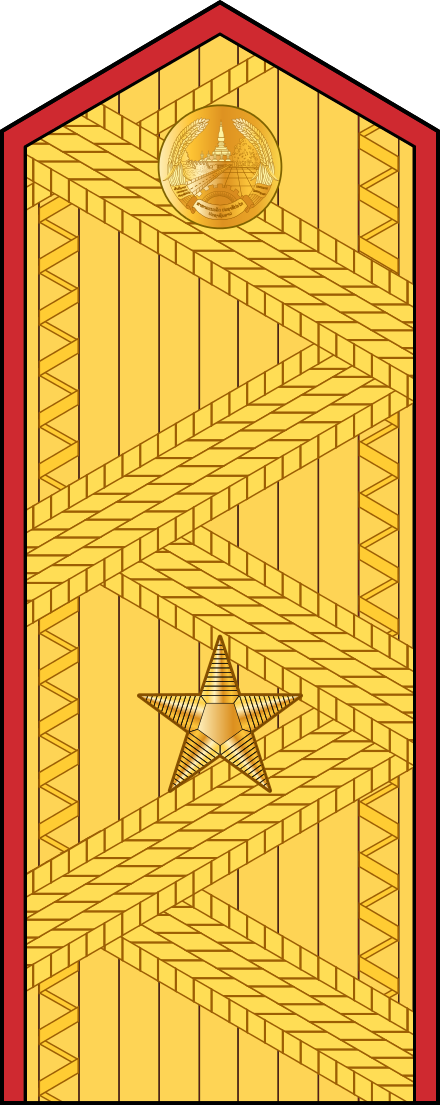
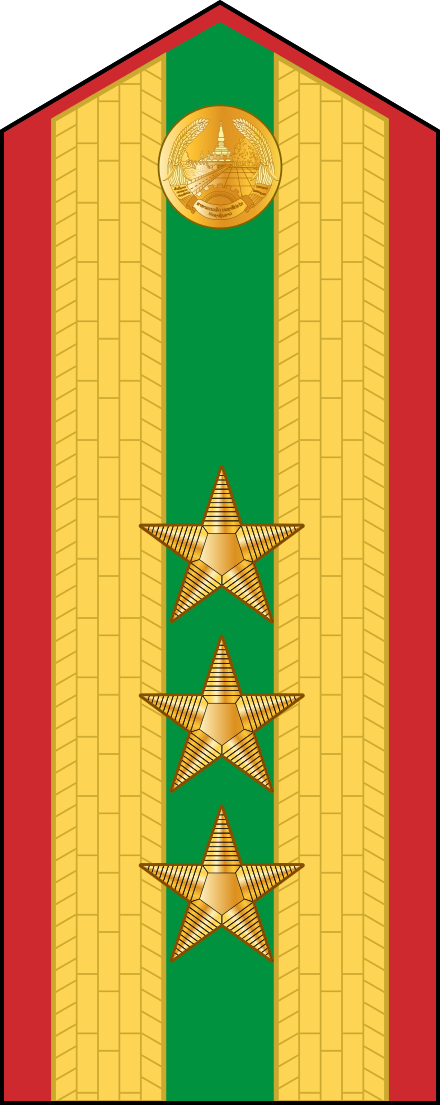
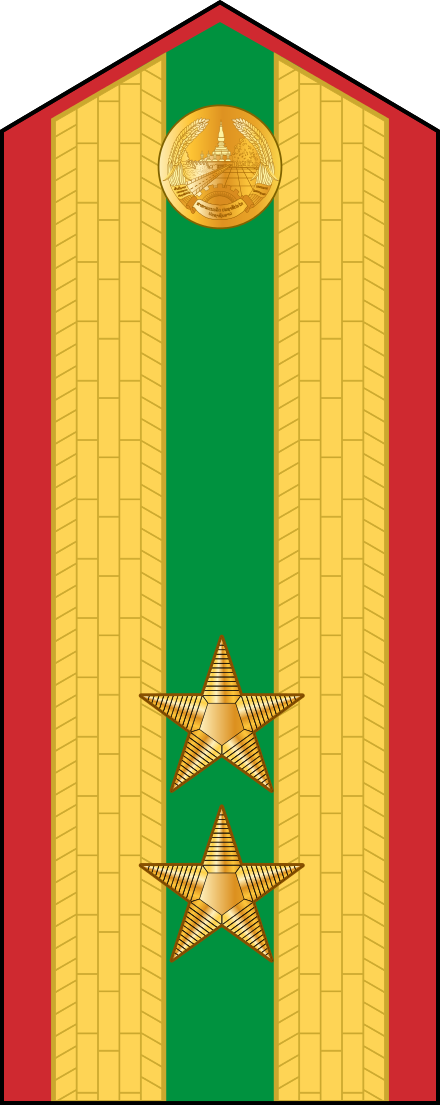
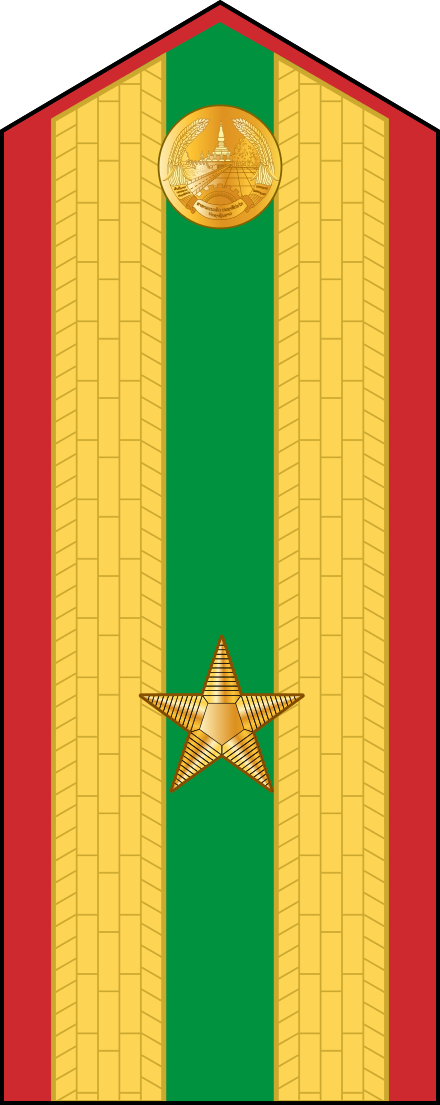
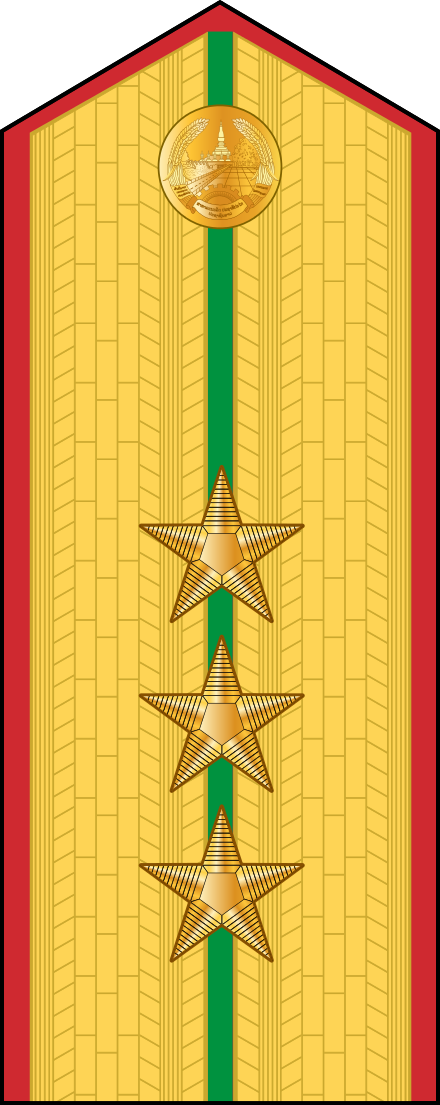
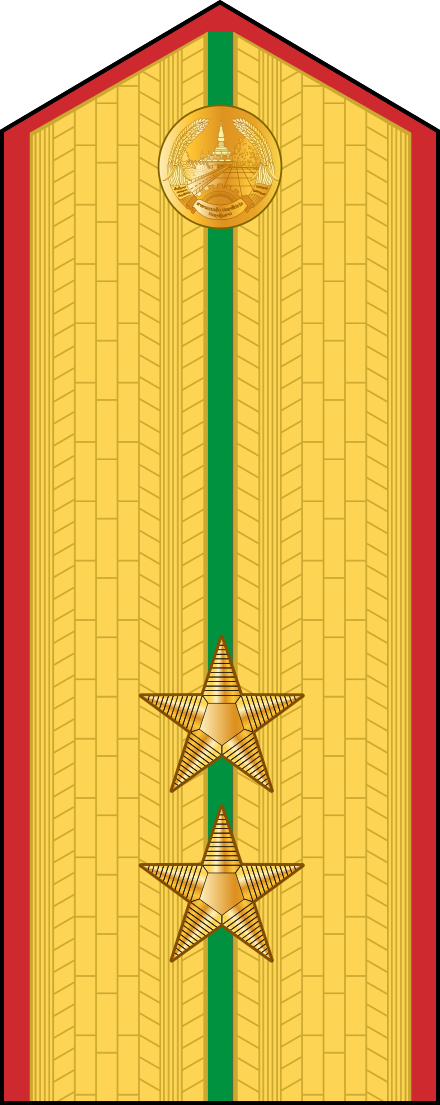
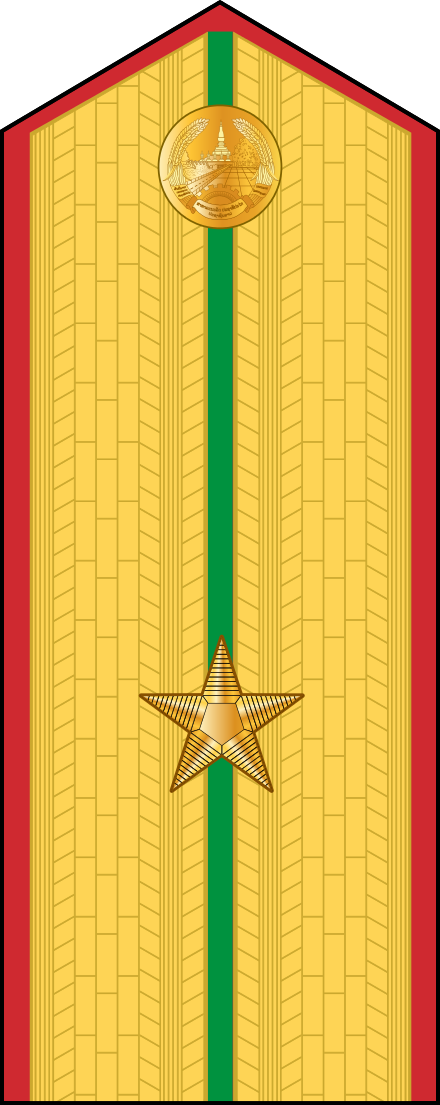
Rank group	General / flag officers				Senior officers			Junior officers
Laos Police
Laos Police	ພົນເອກ; Phonoek	ພົນໂທ; Phonoth	ພົນຕີ Phon ti	ພົນຈັດຕະວາ; Phonchadtauaa	ພັນເອກ; Phanoek	ພັນໂທ; Phanoth	ພັນຕີ Phan ti	ຮ້ອຍເອກ; Honyoek	ຮ້ອຍໂທ; Hony oth	ຮ້ອຍຕີ Hony ti

Enlisted

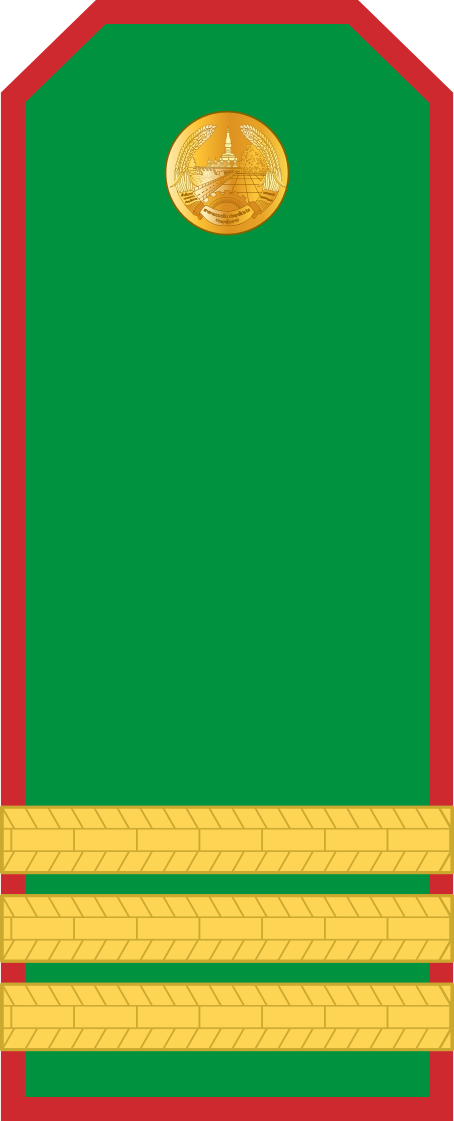
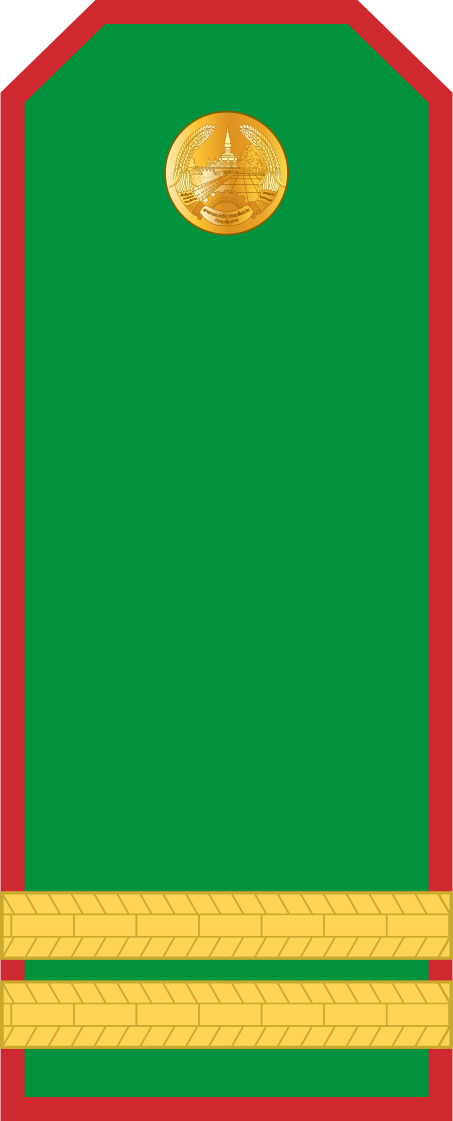
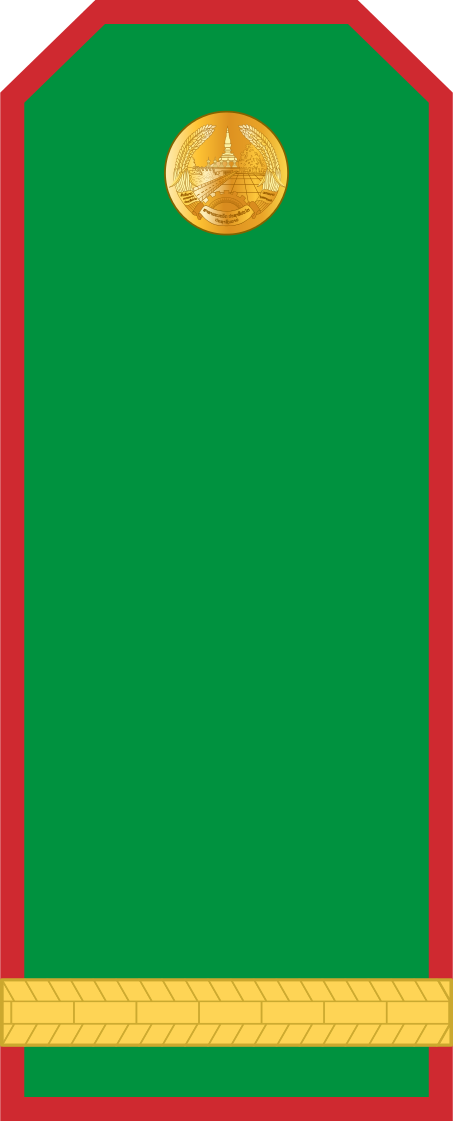
Rank group	Senior NCOs			Junior NCOs	Enlisted
Laos Police
Laos Police	ວາທີ Va thi	ສິບເອກ; Sib ek	ສິບໂທ; Sib oth	ສິບຕີ Sib ti	ຊັ້ນຫນຶ່ງ; Sannung	ຊັ້ນສອງ; Sansong

== Macau ==
The Public Security Police Force of Macau (CPSP) includes the following categories, ranks and respective main functions:

- Command and Management (Cargos de Comando e Direcção)

Superintendent general (superintendente-geral): commander of the CPSP, represent CPSP in public events
Superintendent (superintendente): deputy commander of the CPSP

- Officials (Oficiais)
  Intendent (intendente): commanding officer of level I units
  Sub-Intendent (subintendente): commanding officer of level II units
  Commissioner (comissário): commanding officer of level III units
  Sub-commissioner (subcomissário): commanding officer of level IV units
  Chief (chefe): commanding officer of level V units
- Agents (Agentes)
  Sub-chief (subchefe): coordinator of complex tasks
  Principal constable (guarda principal): coordinator of simple tasks
  Constable first class (guarda de primeira): executor of operational, technical or administrative tasks
  Constable (guarda): executor of operational, technical or administrative tasks

== Malaysia ==
Gazetted officers

Rank group	General / flag officers					Senior officers			Junior officers
	Commissioners						Superintendents			Inspectors
Royal Malaysia Police
Royal Malaysia Police	Inspector-general of police	Deputy inspector general of police	Commissioner of police	Deputy commissioner of police	Senior assistant commissioner of police	Assistant commissioner of police	Superintendent of police	Deputy superintendent of police	Assistant superintendent of police	Inspector	Probationary inspector

Non-gazetted officers

Rank group	Senior NCOs			Junior NCOs		Enlisted
	Non-commissioned officers				Constables
Royal Malaysia Police
Royal Malaysia Police	Sub-inspector	Sergeant major	Sergeant	Corporal	Lance corporal	Constable

== Maldives ==
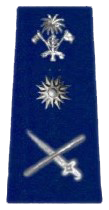
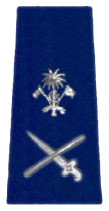
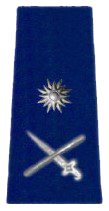
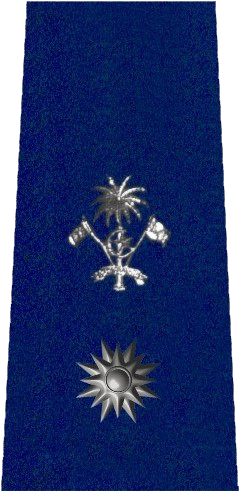
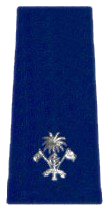
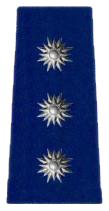
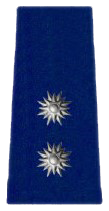
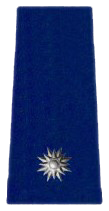
	Commissioner			Superintendent		Inspector
Maldives Police Service
Maldives Police Service	Commissioner of police	Deputy commissioner	Assistant commissioner	Chief superintendent	Superintendent of police	Chief inspector of police	Inspector of police	Sub inspector of Police

	Station inspector		Sergeant		Other
Maldives Police Service							No insignia
Maldives Police Service	Police chief station inspector	Police station inspector	Police staff sergeant	Sergeant	Police corporal	Police lance corporal	Police constable

== Myanmar ==
Commissioned officers

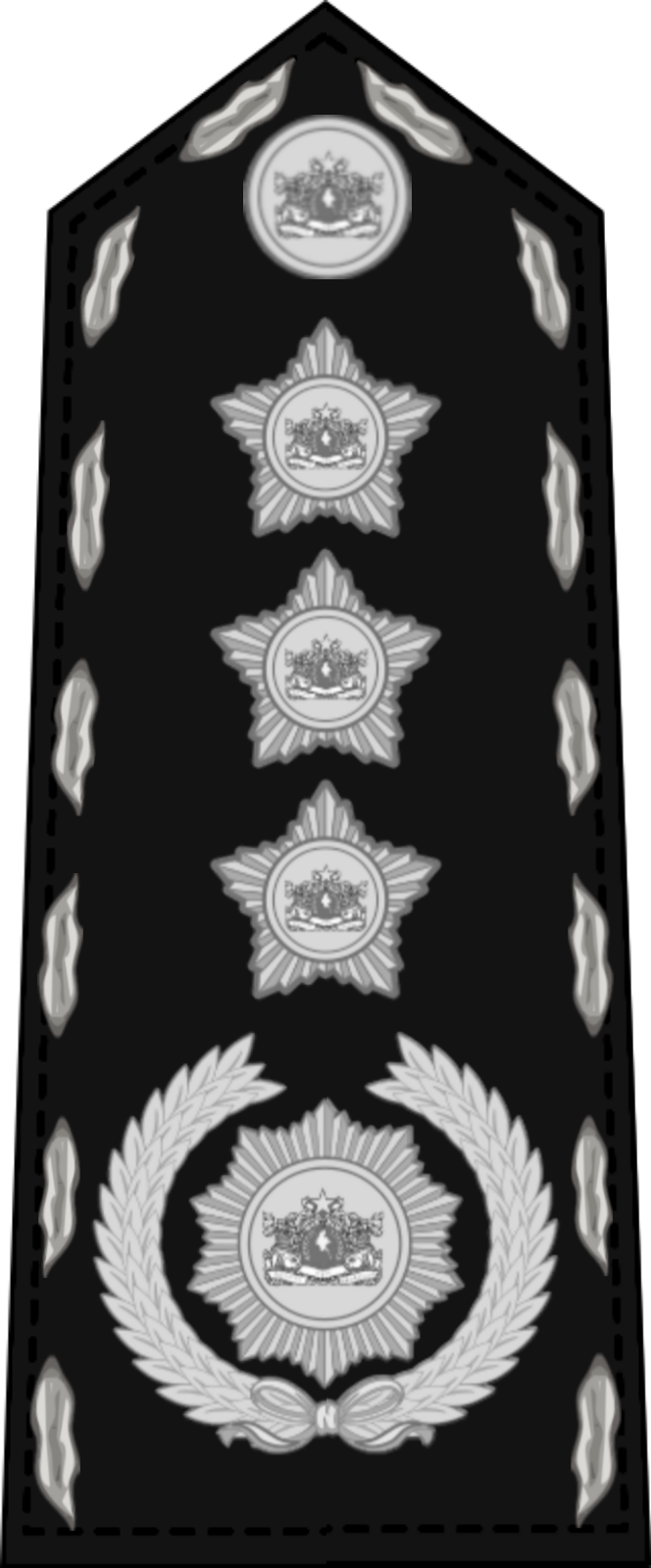
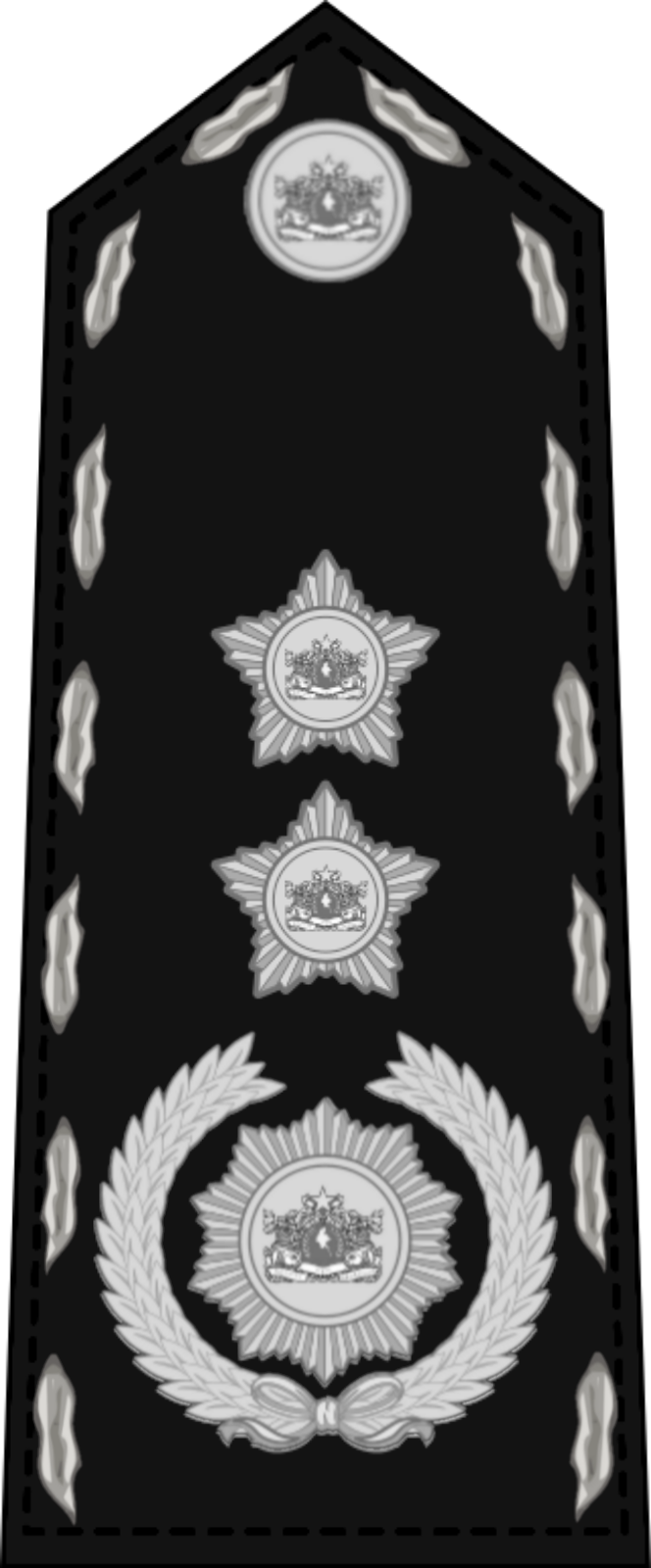
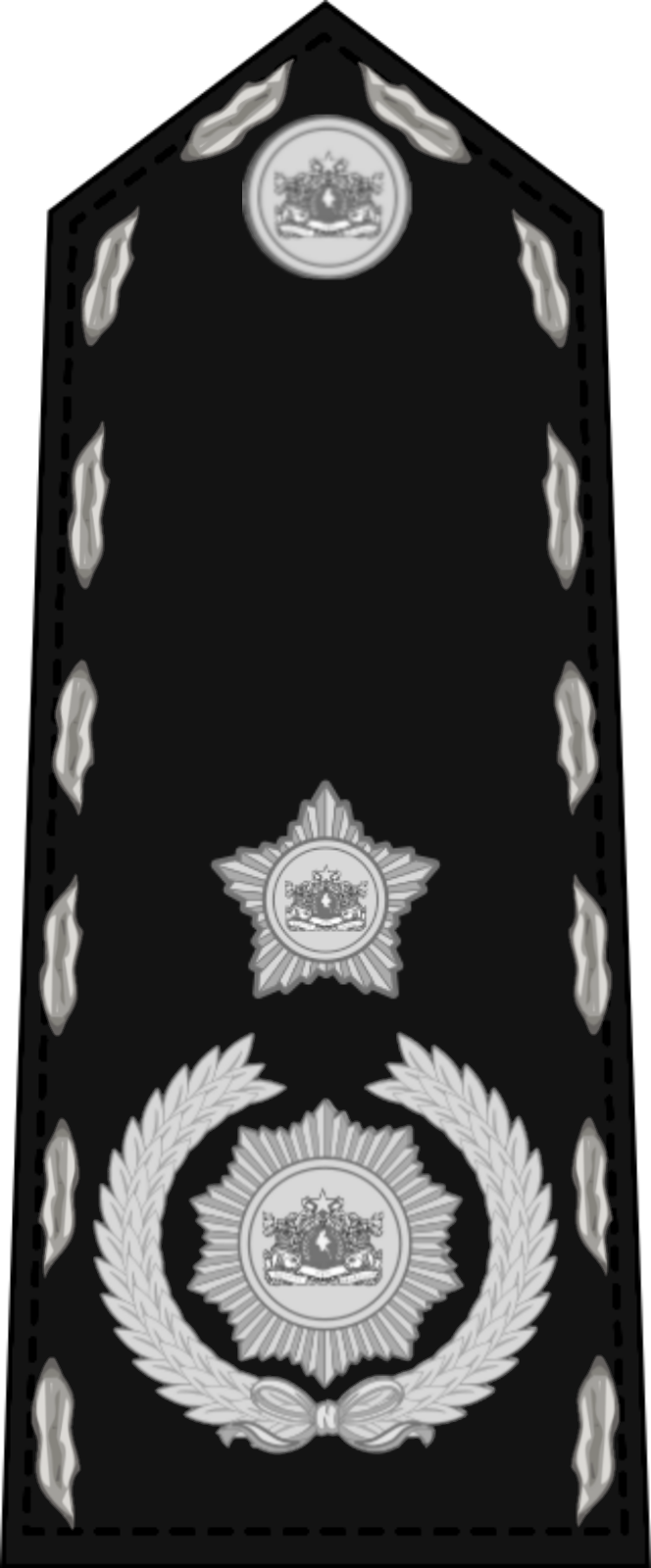
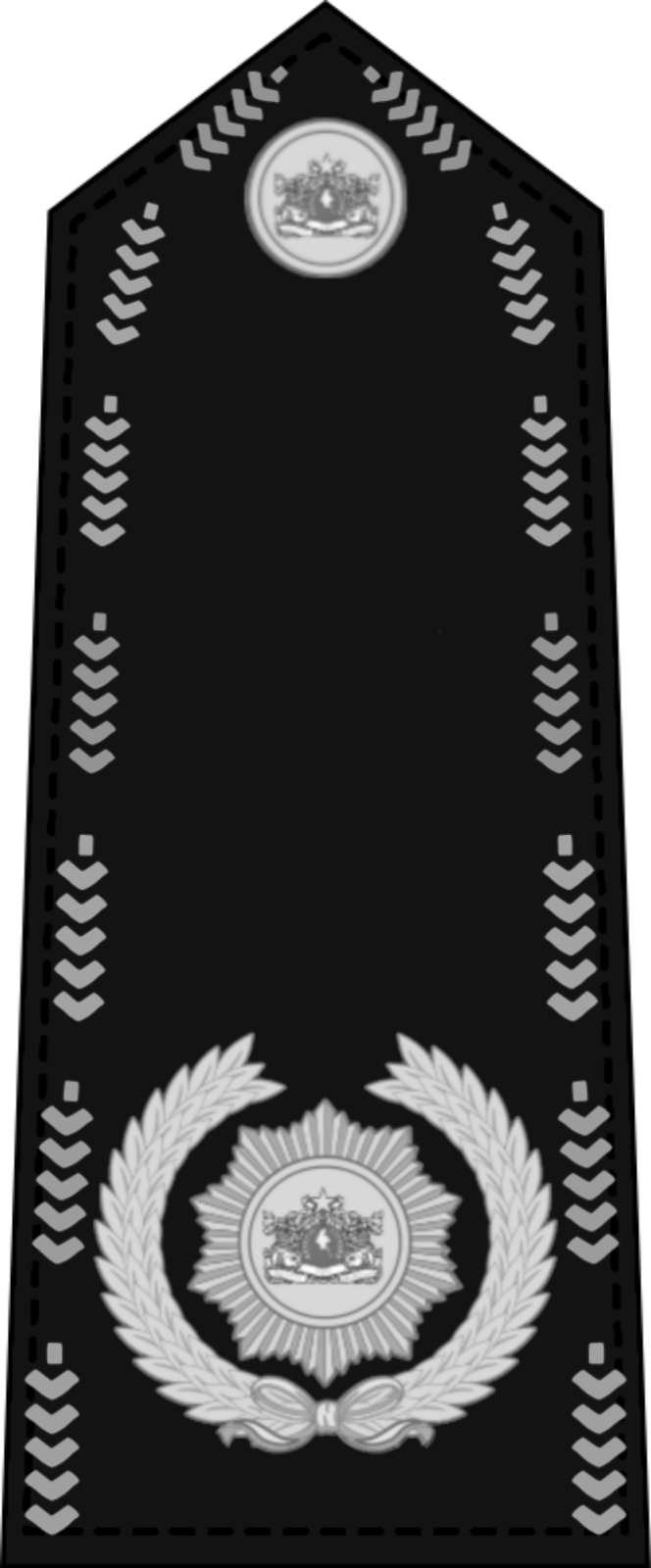
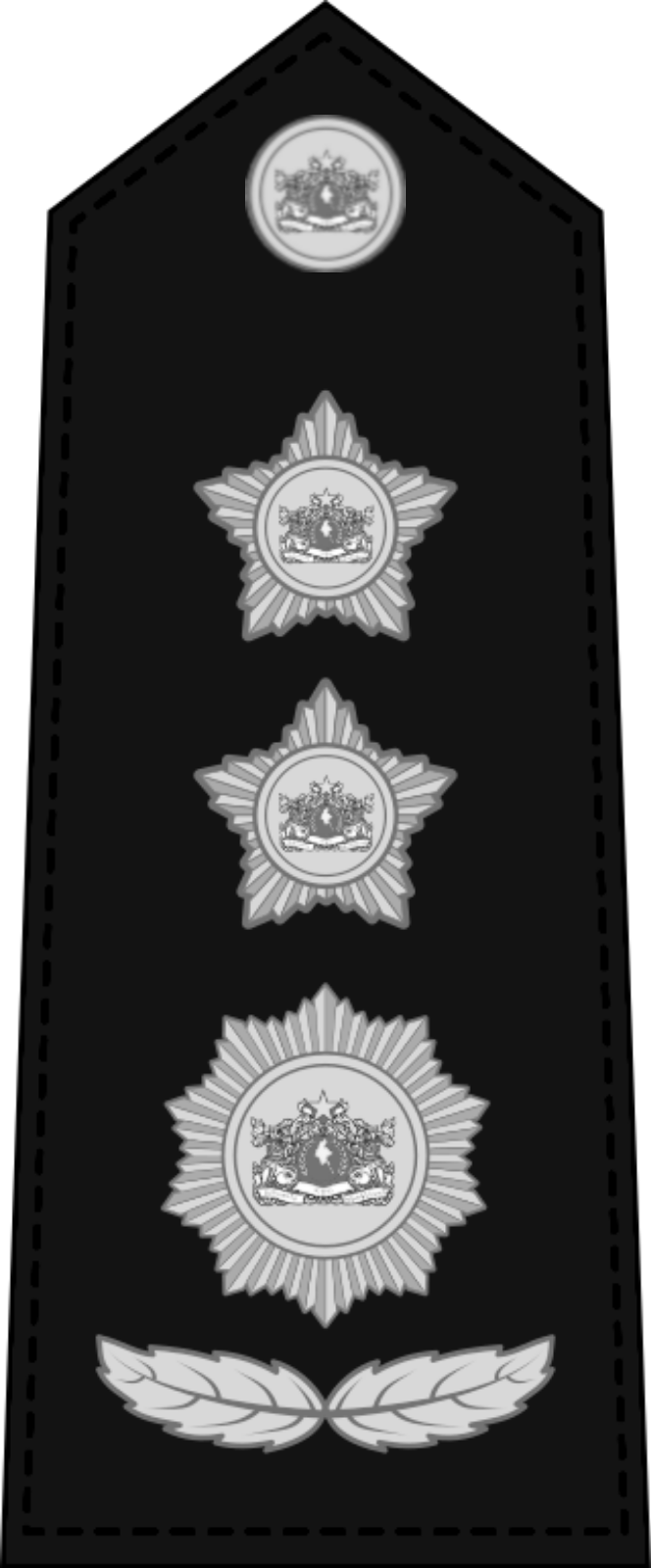
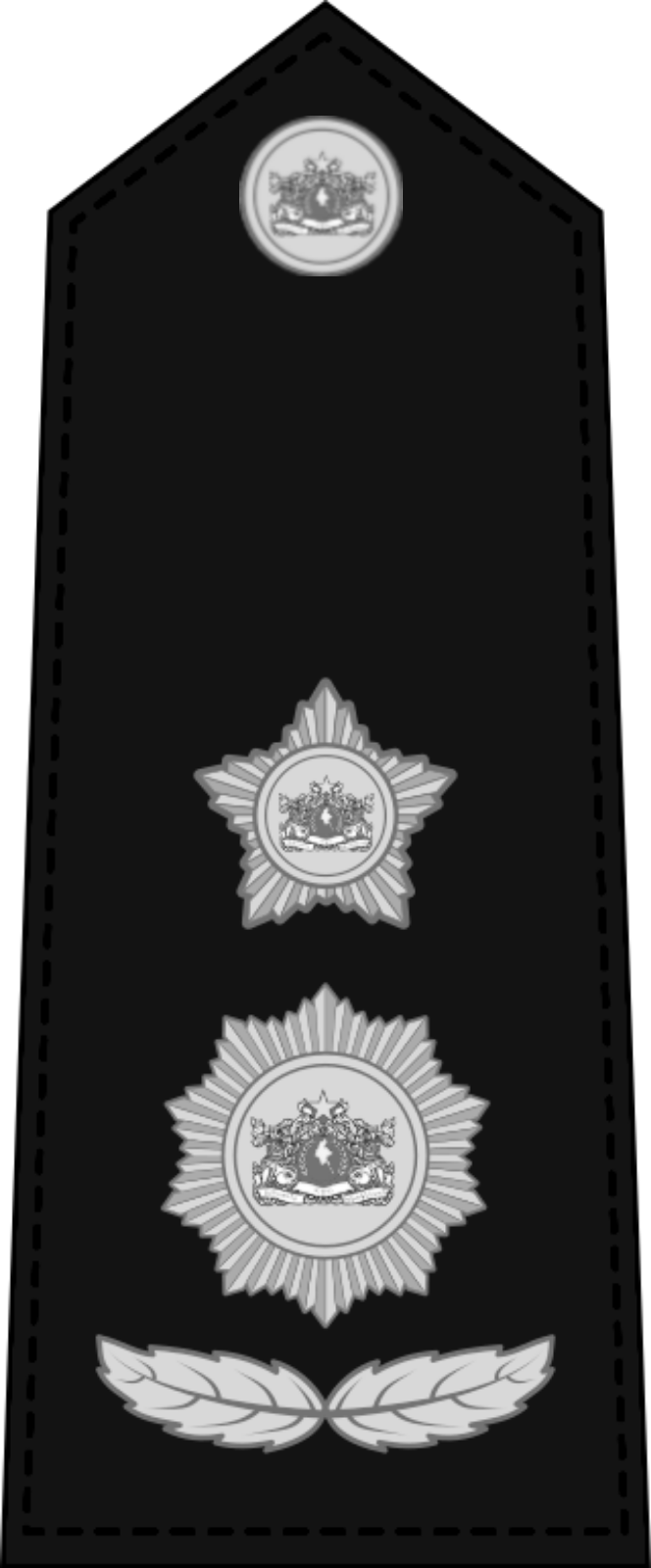
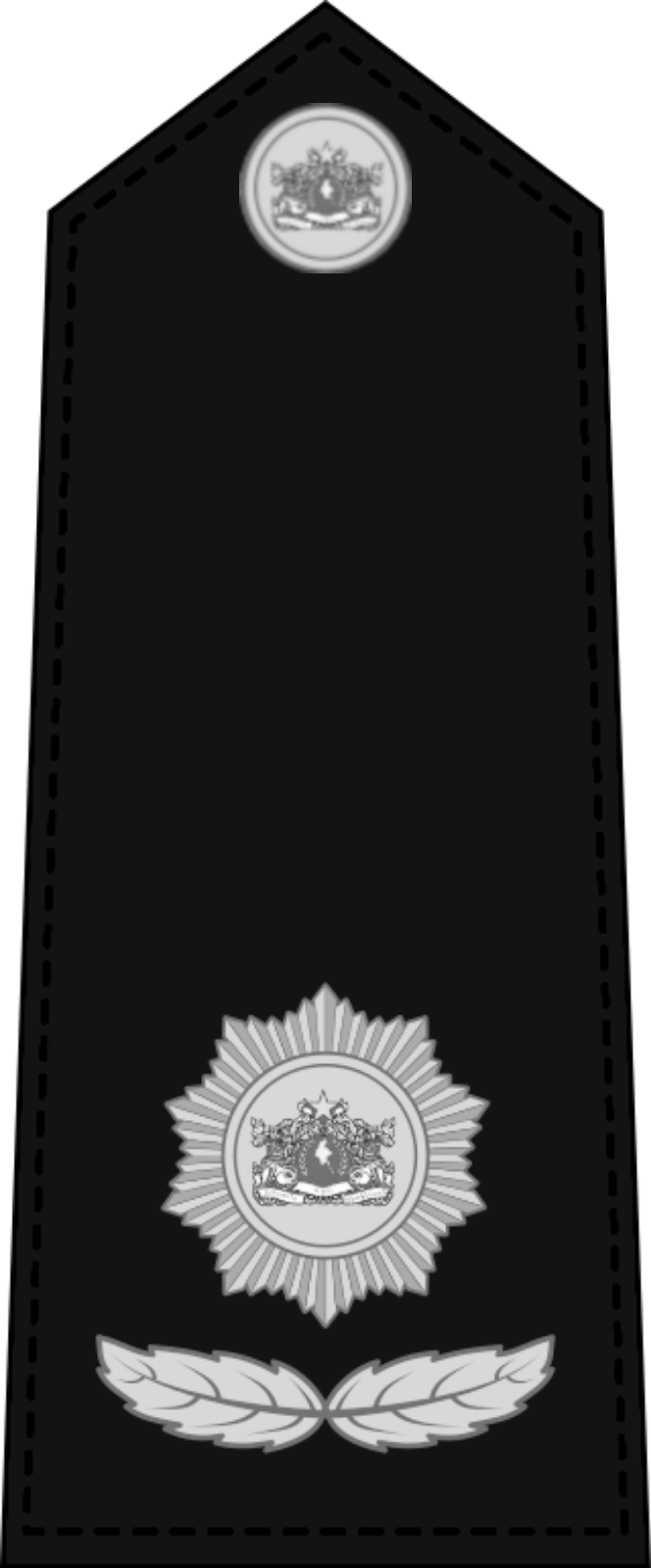
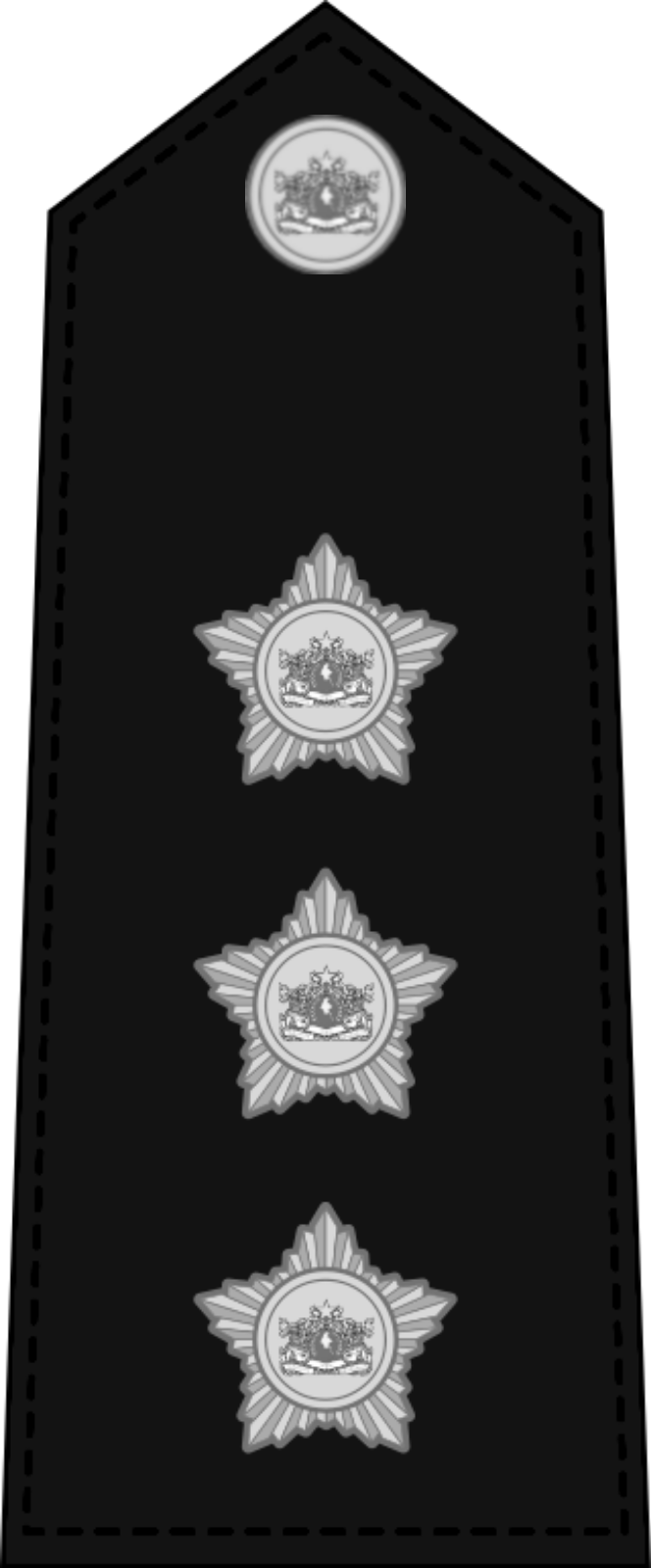
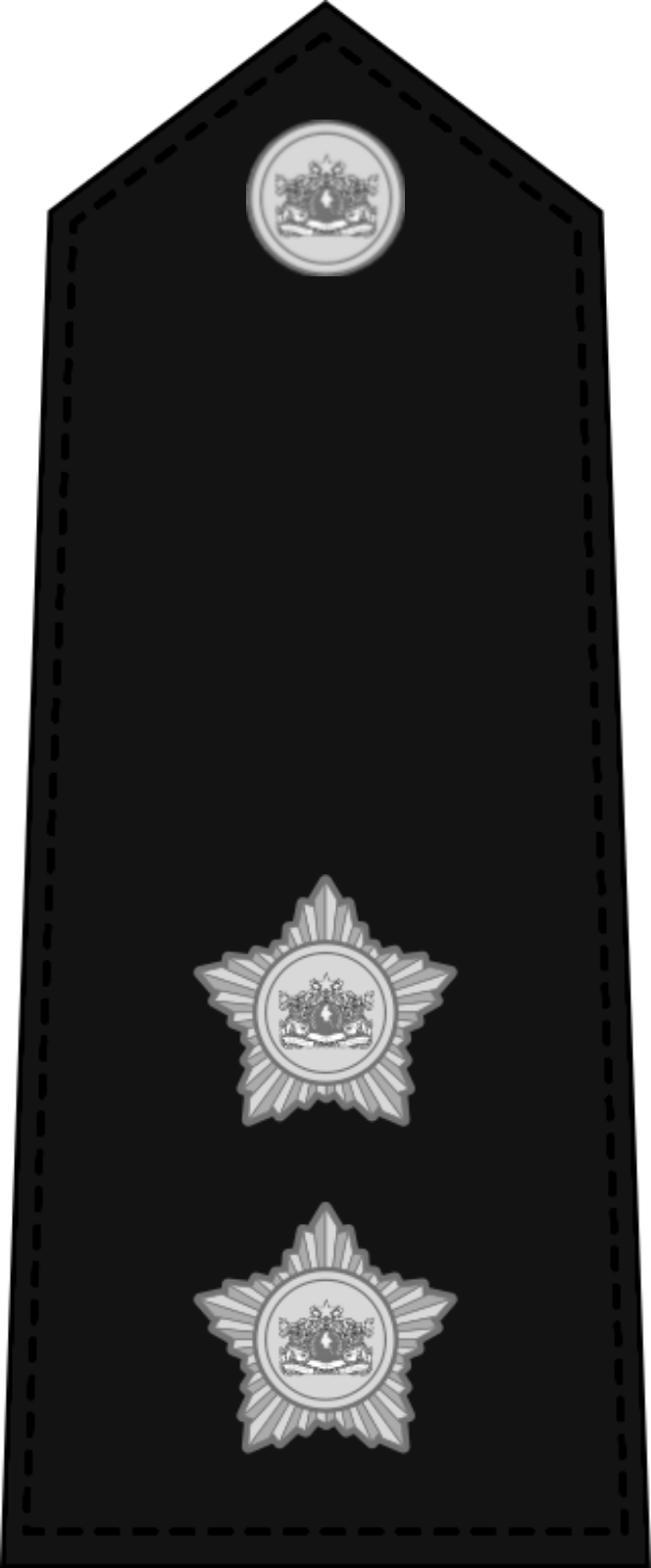
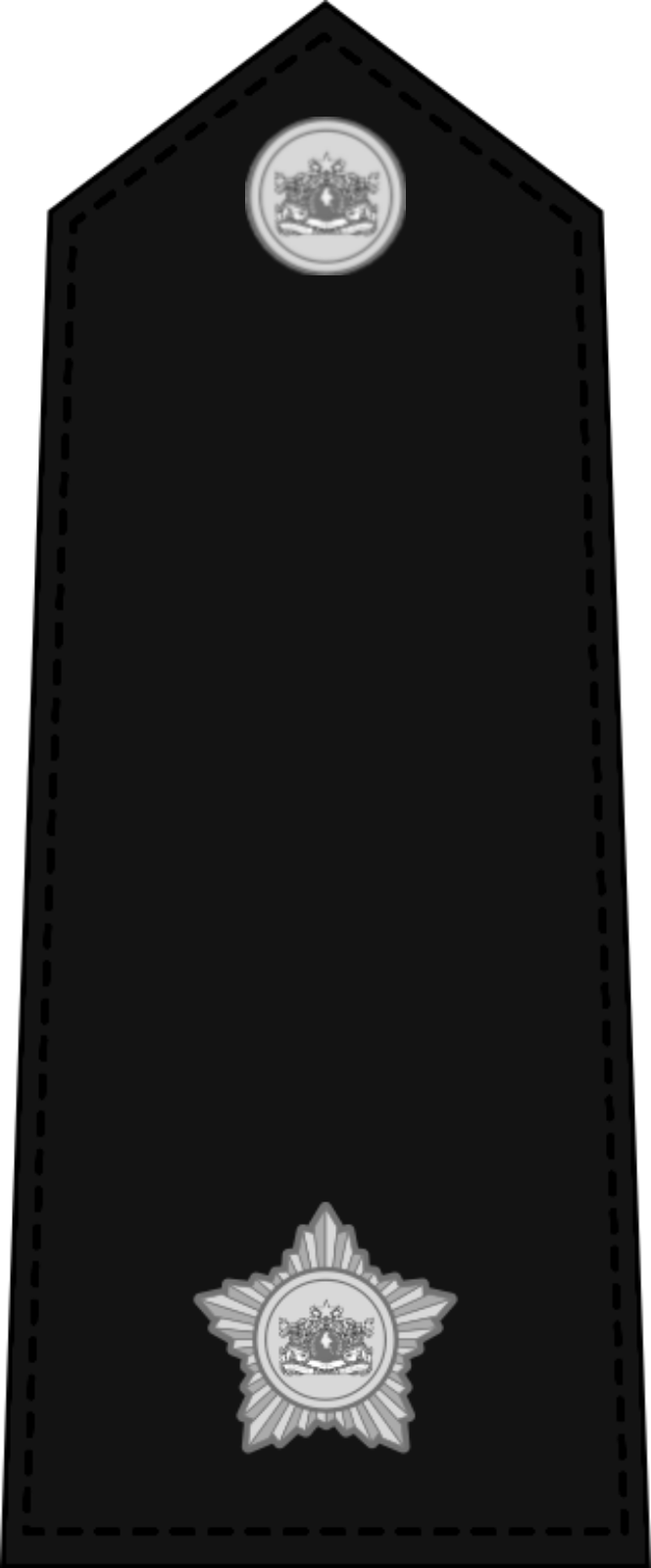
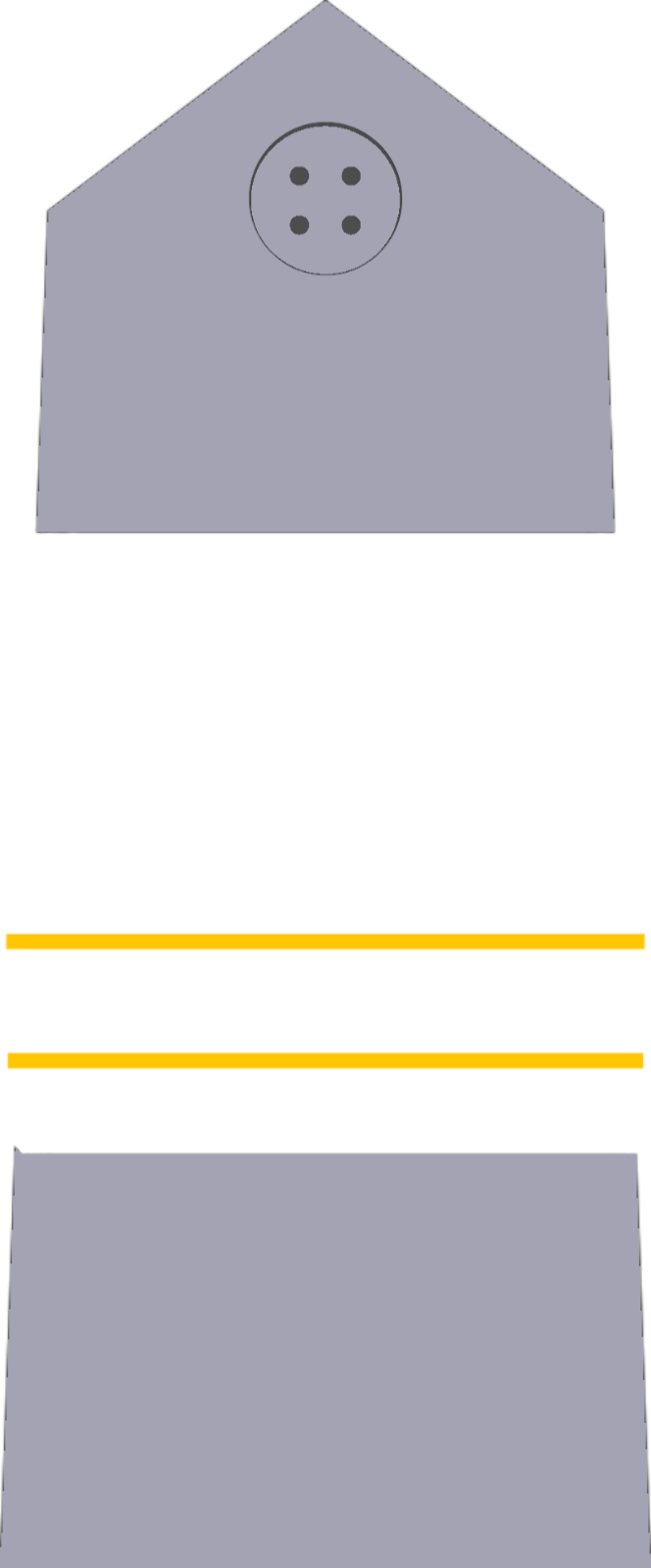
Rank group	General / flag officers				Senior officers			Junior officers
Myanmar Police Force
Myanmar Police Force	ရဲဗိုလ်ချုပ်ကြီး raaibauilaʻ khayupaʻ krīʺ	ဒုတိယရဲဗိုလ်ချုပ်ကြီး dautaiya raaibauilaʻ khayupaʻ krīʺ	ရဲဗိုလ်ချုပ် raaibauilaʻ khayupaʻ	ရဲမှူးချုပ် raaimahūʺ khayupaʻ	ရဲမှူးကြီး raaimahūʺ karī	ဒုတိယရဲမှူးကြီး dautaiya raaimahūʺ karī	ရဲမှူး raaimahūʺ	ဒုတိယရဲမှူး dautaiya raaimahūʺ	ရဲအုပ် raai ’aupaʻ	ဒုတိယရဲအုပ် dautaiya raai ’aupaʻ	ဒုတိယရဲအုပ်လောင်း dautaiya raai ’aupaʻ laoṅaʻʺ

Enlisted ranks

Rank group	Senior NCOs		Junior NCOs		Enlisted
Myanmar Police Force					No insignia	No insignia
Myanmar Police Force	ရဲအရာခံဗိုလ် Raai ’araā khaṃ bauilaʻ	ရဲတပ်ကြပ်ကြီး Raai tapaʻ karpaʻ krīʺ	ရဲတပ်ကြပ် Raai tapaʻ karpaʻ	ဒုတိယရဲတပ်ကြပ် Dautaiya tapaʻ karpaʻ	ရဲတပ်သား Raai tapaʻ saāʺ	ရဲတပ်သားသစ် Raai tapaʻ saāʺ sacaʻ

== Nepal ==
The Nepal Police has fourteen ranks. Three new ranks, Senior Sub Inspector (SSI), Senior Head Constable (SHC), and Assistant Head Constable (AHC), were recently added to the Nepal Police.

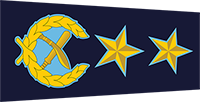
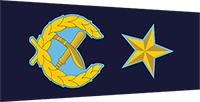
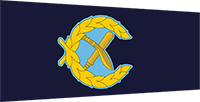
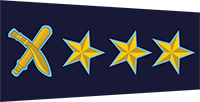
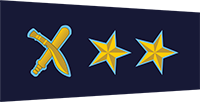
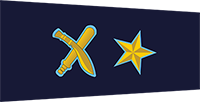
प्रहरी महानिरीक्षक Prahārī Mahānirīkr̥ṣak	प्रहरी अतिरिक्त महानिरीक्षक Prahārī Atirikt Mahānirīkr̥ṣak	प्रहरी नायव महानिरीक्षक Prahārī Nāyava Mahānirīkr̥ṣak	प्रहरी वरिष्ठ उपरीक्षक Prahārī Varishṭ Uparīkṣak	प्रहरी उपरीक्षक Prahārī Uparīkṣak	प्रहरी नायव उपरीक्षक Prahārī Nāyava Uparīkṣak	प्रहरी निरीक्षक Prahārī Nirīkṣak
Two-star pips, crossed Khukuri and police baton within a wreath of Lotus leaves	One-star pip, crossed Khukuri and police baton within a wreath of Lotus leaves	Crossed Khukuri and police baton within a wreath of Lotus leaves	Three stars pips with crossed Khukuri and police baton	Two stars pips with crossed Khukuri and police baton	One-star pip, crossed Khukuri and police baton	Crossed Khukuri and police baton
Inspector General (IGP)	Additional Inspector General (AIG)	Deputy Inspector General (DIG)	Senior Superintendent (SSP)	Superintendent (SP)	Deputy Superintendent (DSP)	Inspector (INSP)

प्रहरी वरिष्ठ नायव निरीक्षक Prahārī Varishṭ Nāyava Nirīkṣak	प्रहरी नायव निरीक्षक Prahārī Nāyava Nirīkṣak	प्रहरी सहायक निरीक्षक Prahārī Sahāyak Nirīkṣak	प्रहरी वरिष्ठ हवल्दार Prahārī Varishṭ Havaladār	प्रहरी हवल्दार Prahārī Havaladār	प्रहरी सहायक हवल्दार Prahārī Sahāyak Havaladār	प्रहरी जवान Prahārī Jwān
Three star pips	Two star pips	One star pip	Three chevrons on the shoulder with a yellow shoulder strap	Three chevrons on shoulder	Two chevrons on shoulder	A red and yellow shoulder strap
Senior Sub Inspector (SSI)	Sub Inspector (SI)	Assistant Sub Inspector (ASI)	Police Senior Head Constable (SHC)	Police Head Constable (HC)	Police Assistant Head Constable (AHC)	Police Constable (PC)

== Pakistan ==
=== Commissioned and gazetted officer ===
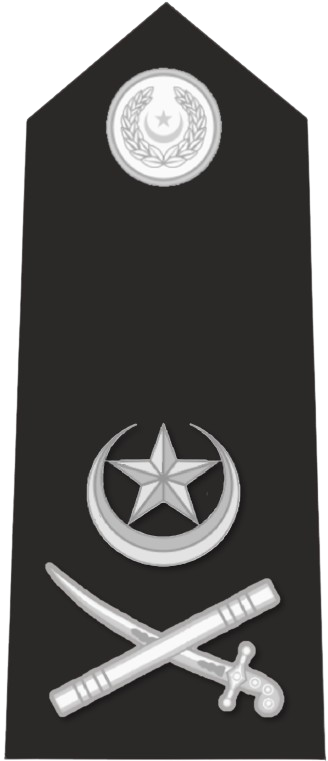
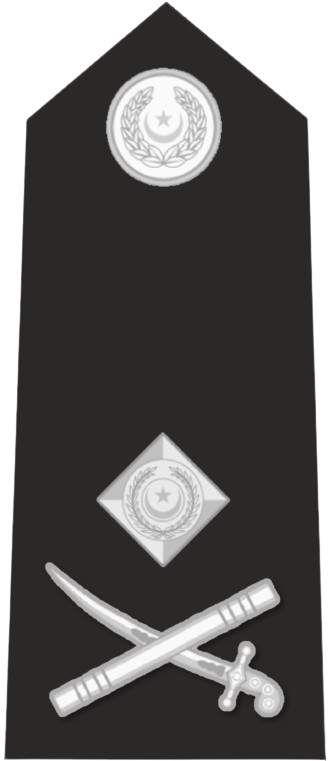
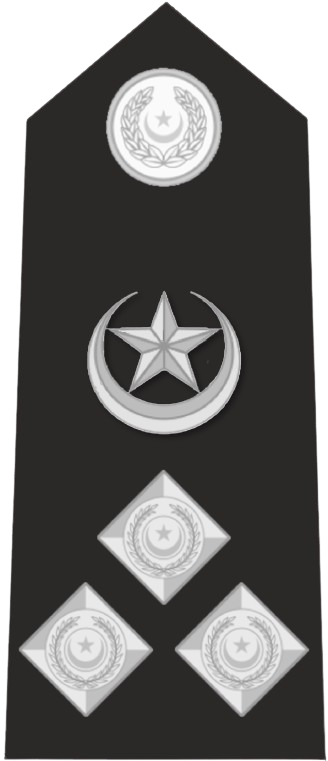
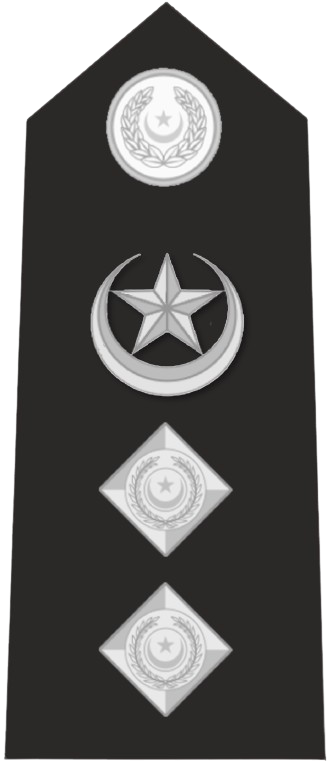
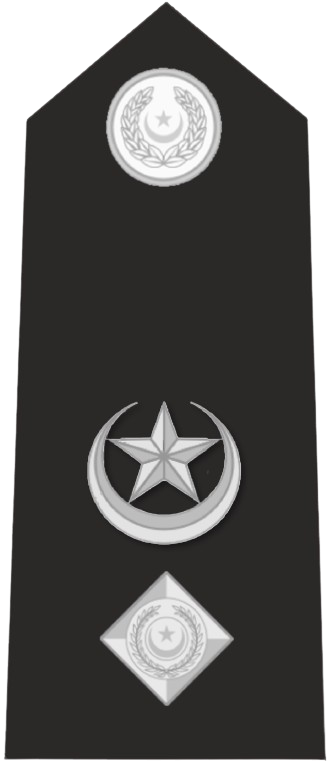
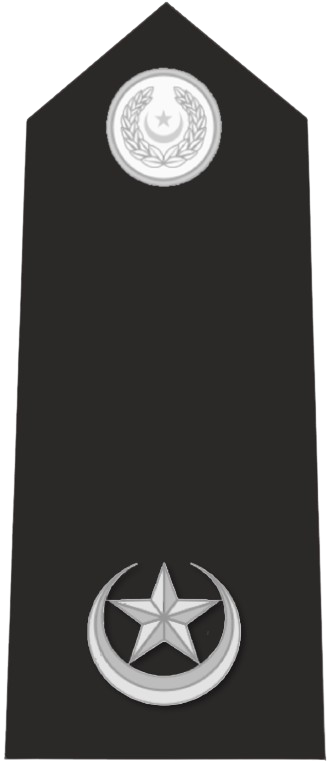
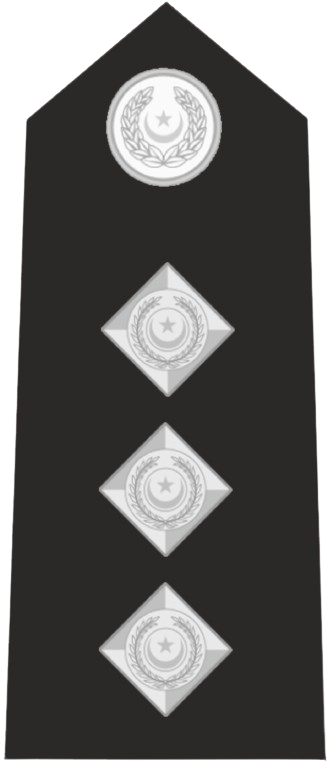
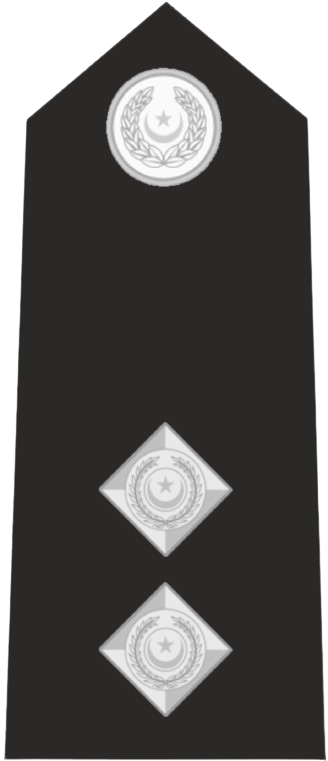
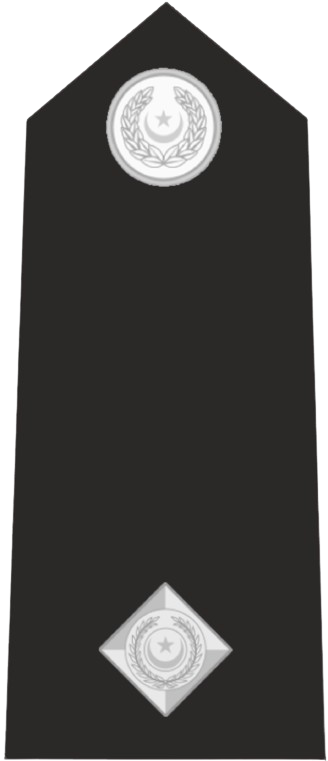
Rank group	General/flag officers			Senior officers			Junior officers
Pakistan Police
Pakistan Police	Inspector general of police	Additional inspector general of police	Deputy inspector general of police	Assistant inspector general of police / Senior superintendent of police	Superintendent of police	Superintendent of police	Deputy superintendent of police	Assistant superintendent of police	Assistant superintendent of police
Pakistan Police	(IGP)	(Addl-IG)	(DIG)	(AIG/SSP)	(SP With 8 Year Service)	(SP)	(DSP)	(Probationary Rank: 2 years of service)	(Probationary Rank: 1 year of service)

=== Junior commissioned and enlisted officer ===
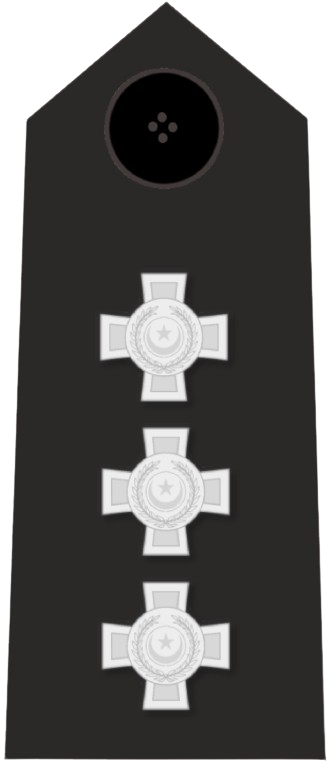
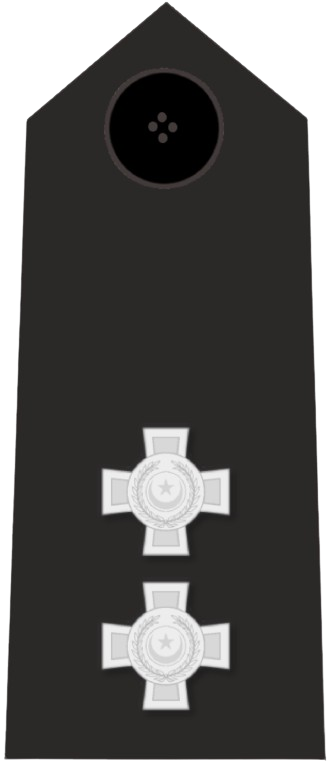
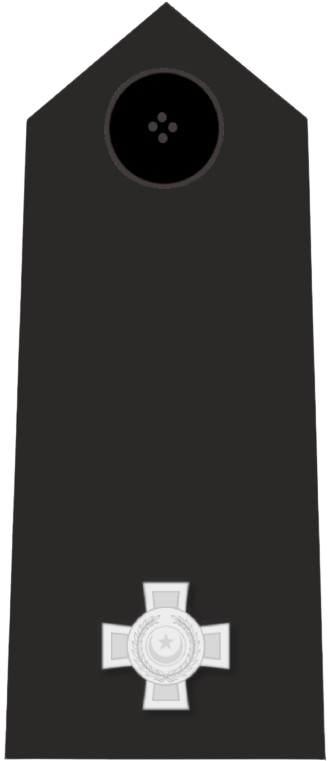
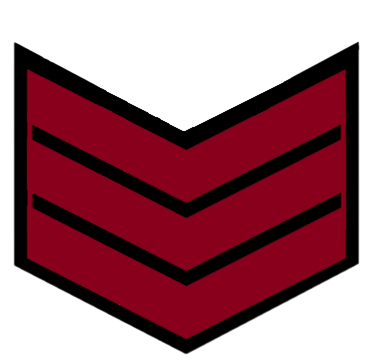
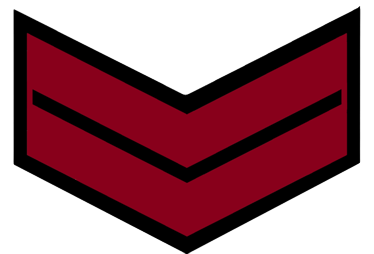
Rank group	Junior commissioned officers			Non commissioned officer		Enlisted
Pakistan Police						No insignia
Pakistan Police	Inspector	Sub inspector	Assistant sub inspector	Head constable	Police naik	Constable
Pakistan Police	انسپکٹر	سب انسپکٹر	اسسٹنٹ سب انسپکٹر	ہیڈ کانسٹیبل	پولیس نائک	سپاہی

- Note: Khaki Black Shirt and Khaki Pant is used by all Provincial Police Forces in Pakistan with Exemption of Punjab and Federal Police.

== Philippines ==
Officers

Rank group	General / flag officers				Senior officers			Junior officers
(Philippines) Philippine National Police
(Philippines) Philippine National Police	Police general	Police lieutenant general	Police major general	Police brigadier general	Police colonel	Police lieutenant colonel	Police major	Police captain	Police lieutenant

Others

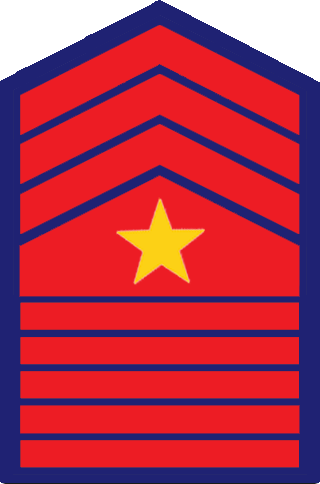
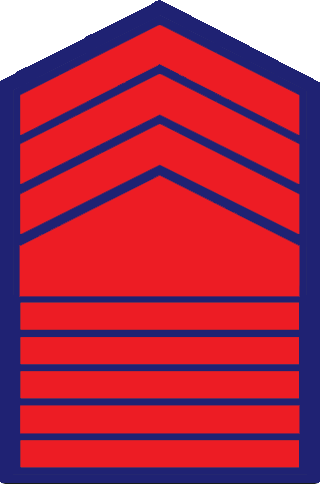
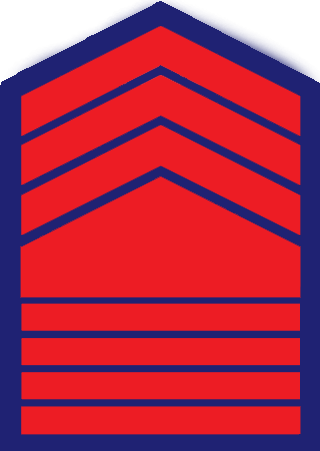
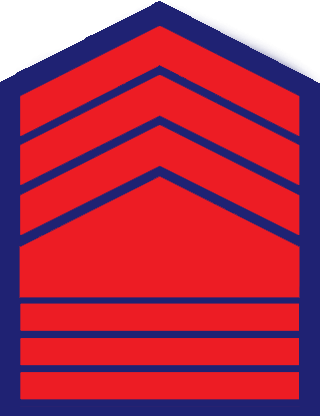
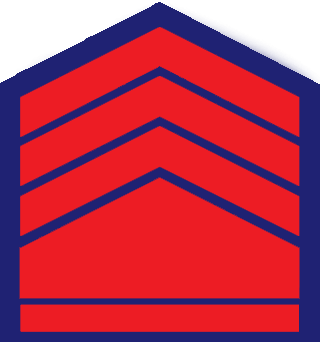
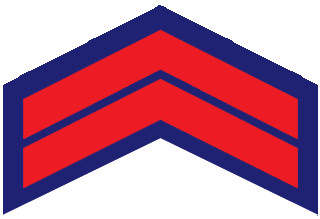
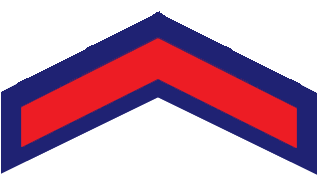
Rank group	Senior NCOs					Junior NCOs	Enlisted
(Philippines) Philippine National Police
(Philippines) Philippine National Police	Police executive master sergeant	Police chief master sergeant	Police senior master sergeant	Police master sergeant	Police staff sergeant	Police corporal	Patrolman/ Patrolwoman

== Saudi Arabia ==
Officers

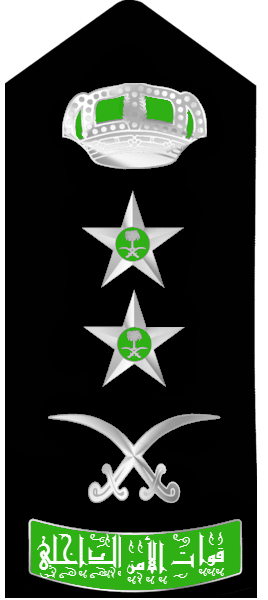
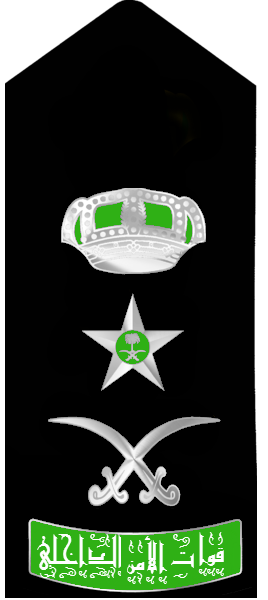
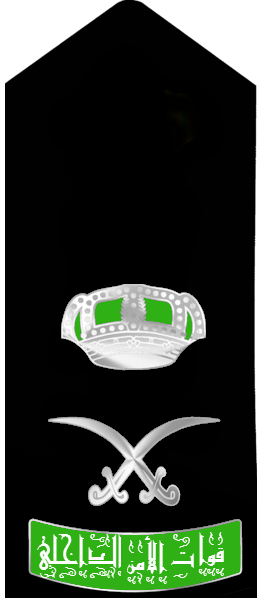
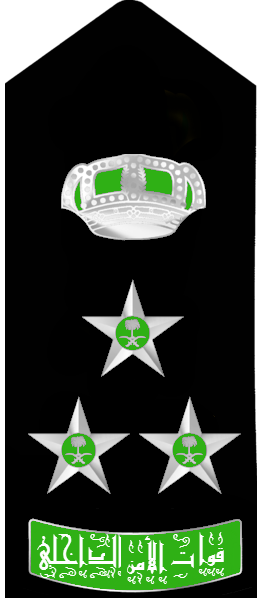
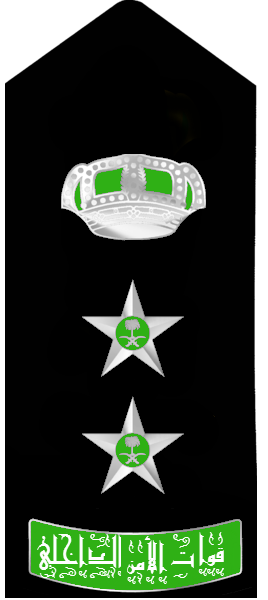
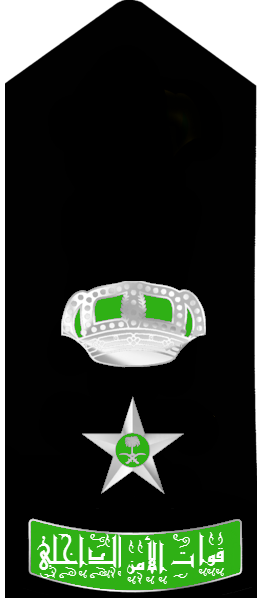
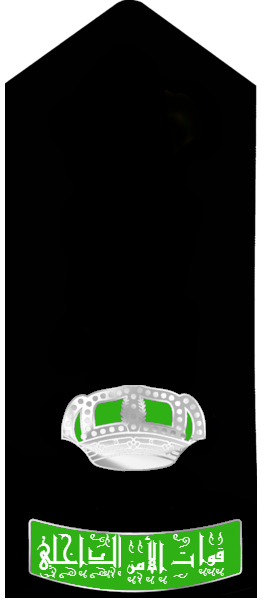
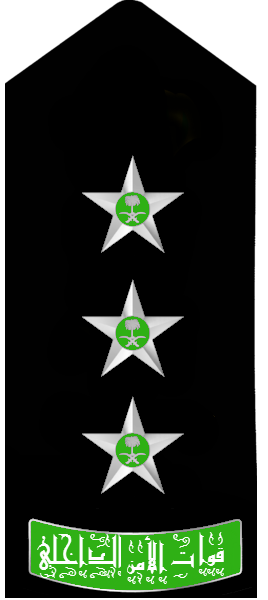
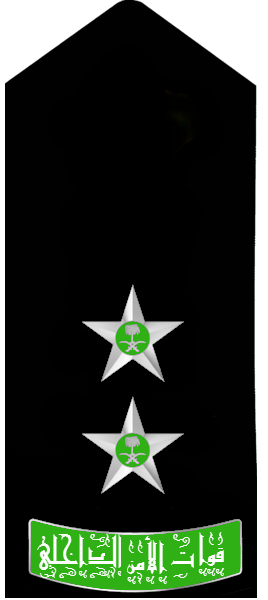
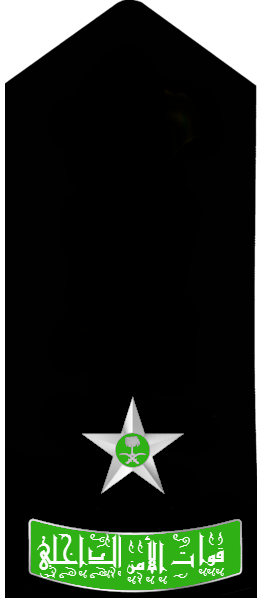
Rank group	General / flag officers				Senior officers			Junior officers
(Saudi Arabia) General Directorate of Public Security
(Saudi Arabia) General Directorate of Public Security	فريق أول; Fariq 'awal	فريق; Fariq	لواء; Liwa	عميد; Amid	عقيد; Aqid	مقدم; Muqaddam	رائد; Ra'id	نقيب; Naqib	ملازم أول; Mulazim awwal	ملازم; Mulazim

Enlisted

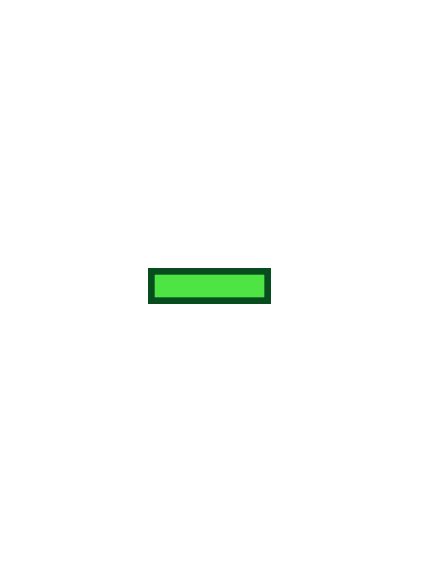
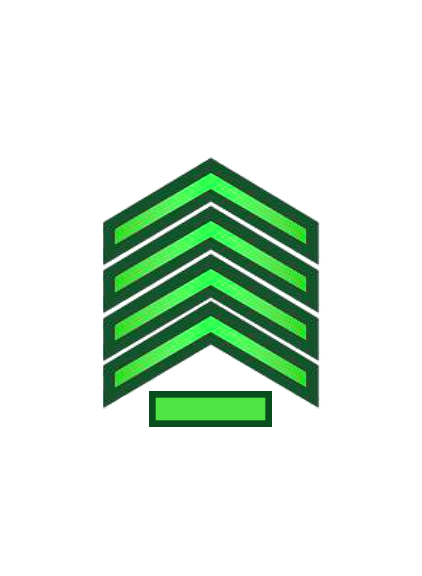
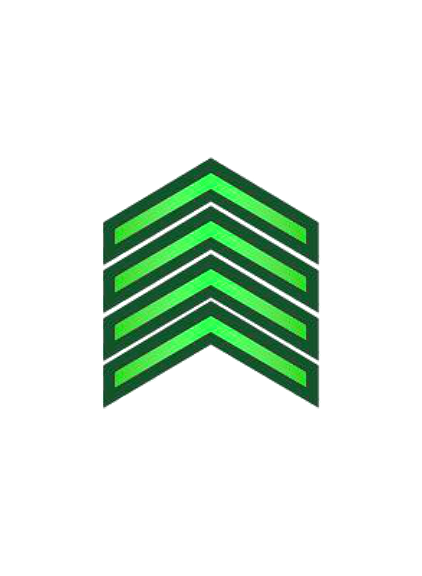
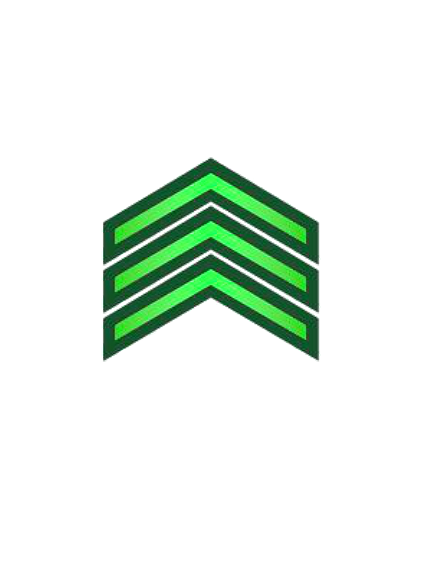
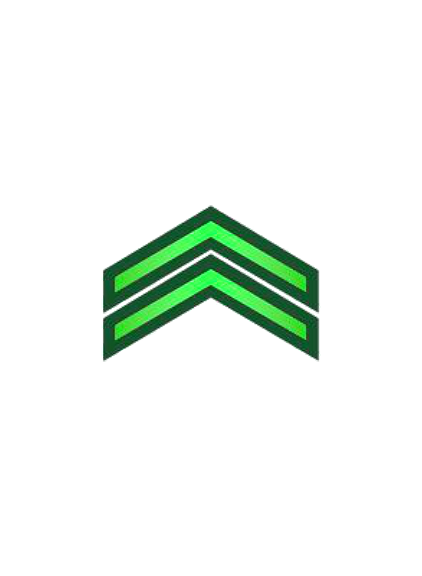
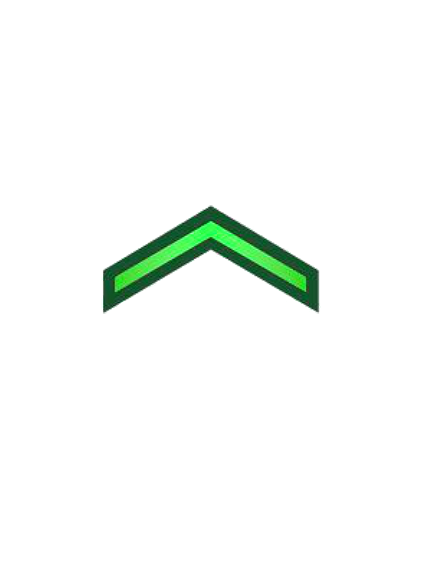
Rank group	Senior NCOs				Junior NCOs	Enlisted
(Saudi Arabia) General Directorate of Public Security							No insignia
(Saudi Arabia) General Directorate of Public Security	رئيس رقباء; Rayiys ruqaba'	رقيب أول; Raqib 'awal	رقيب; Raqib	وكيل رقيب; Wakil raqib	عريف; Earif	جندي أول; Jundiun awwal	جندي; Jundiun

== Singapore ==
Below shown are the rank structure of the Singapore Police Force. Latest changes made to the ranks of the SPF were made in 2016. Officers with ranks that were made obsolete would continue to carry their ranks until their next promotion.

Senior police officers (commissioned)

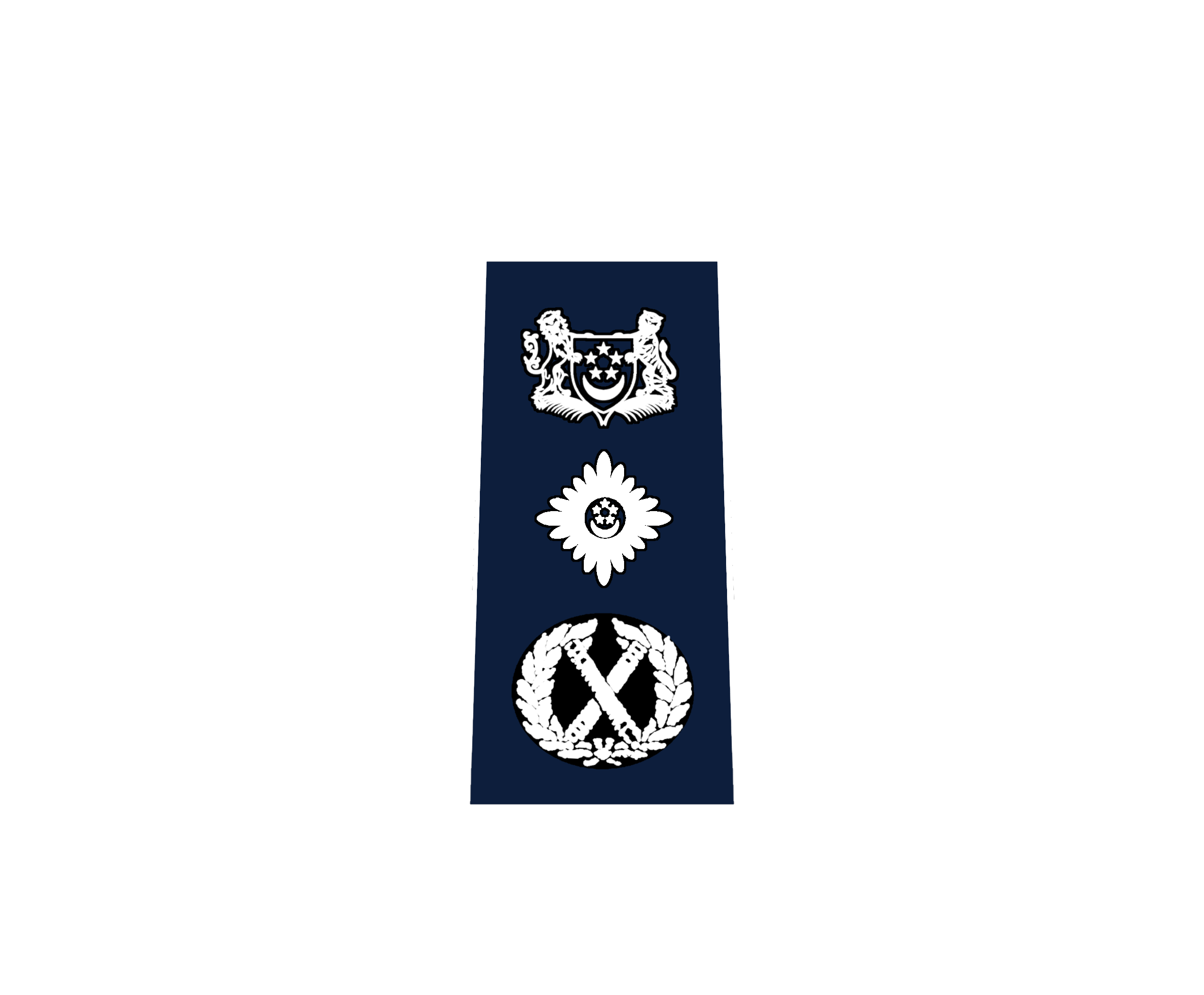
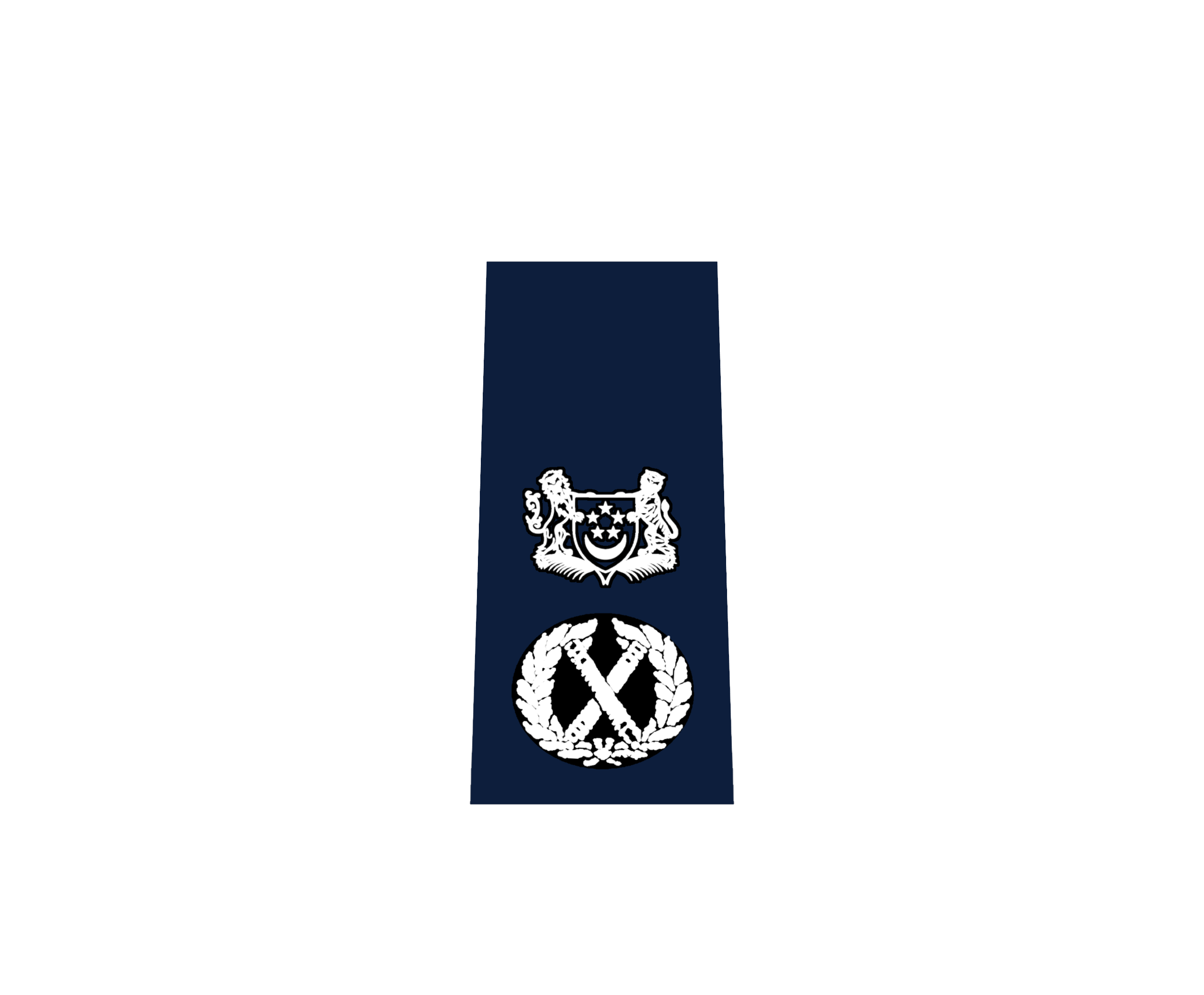
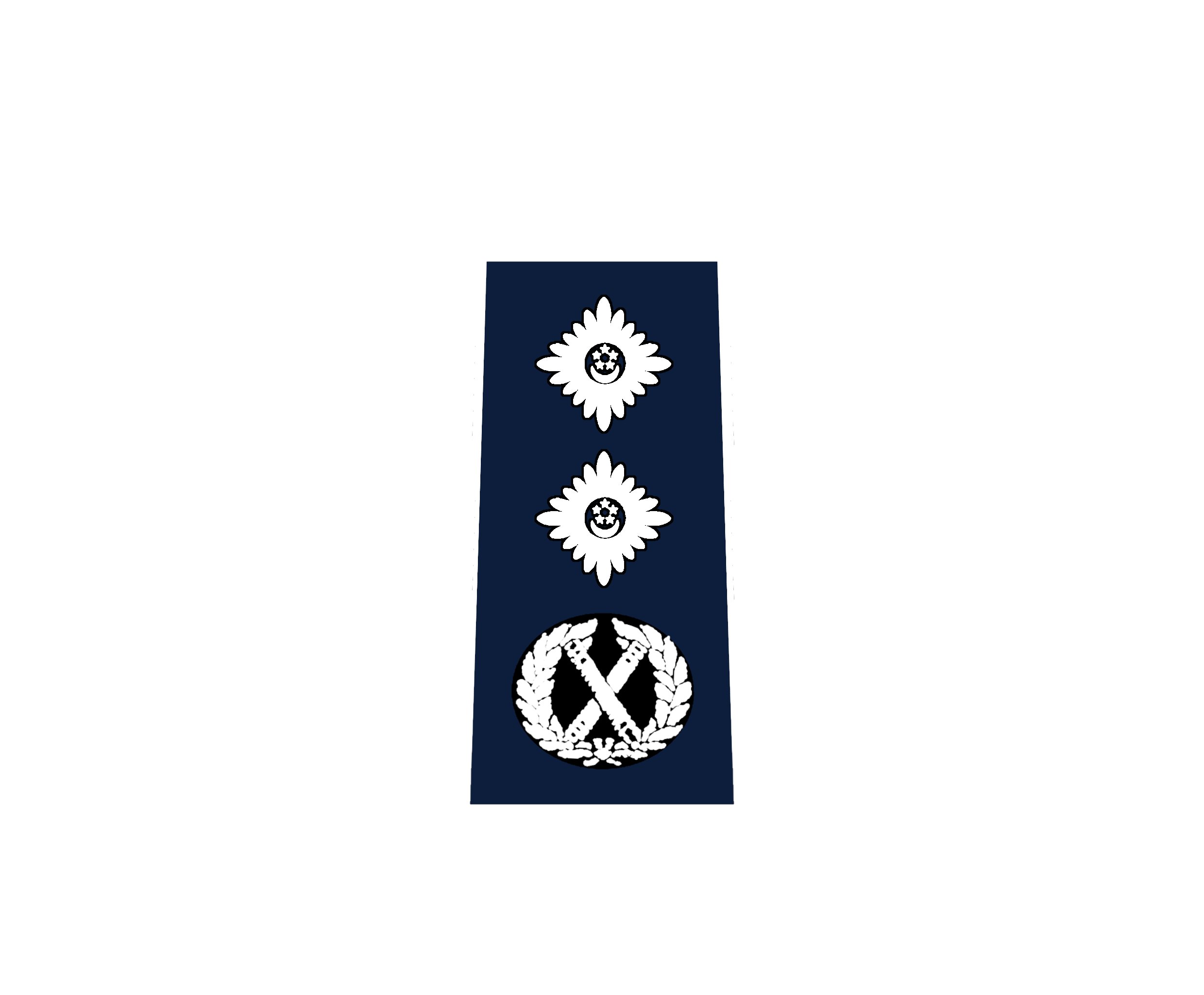
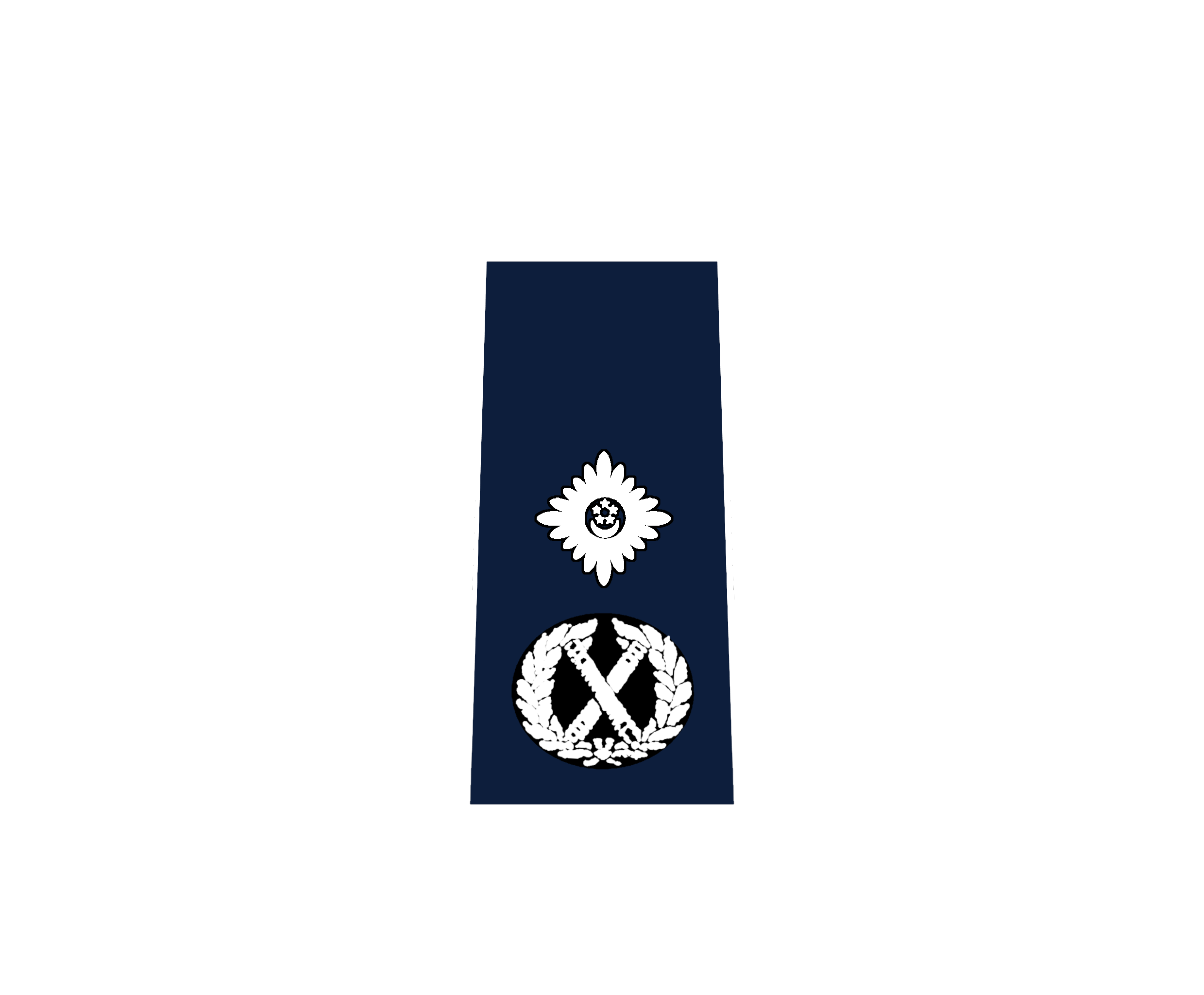
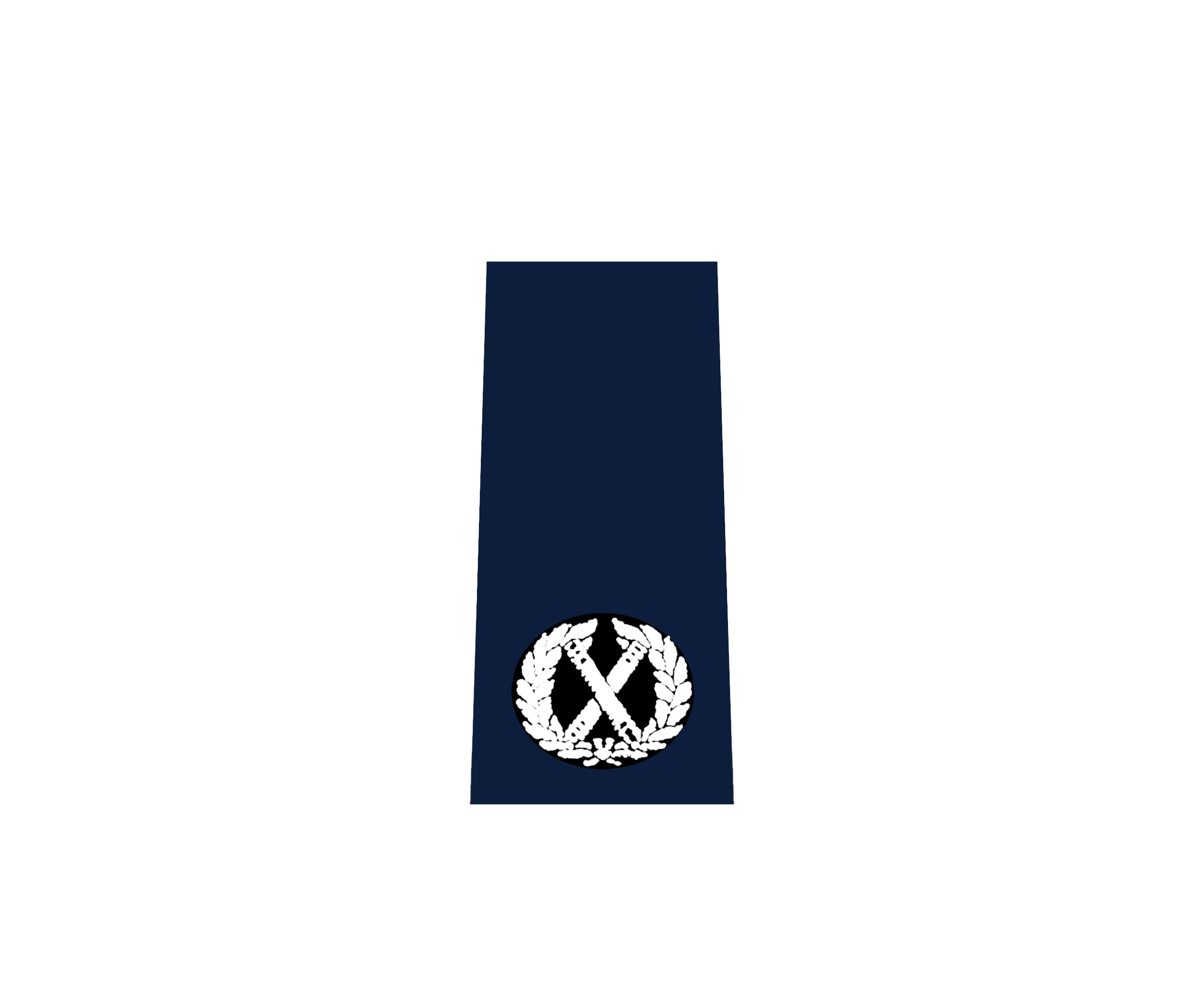
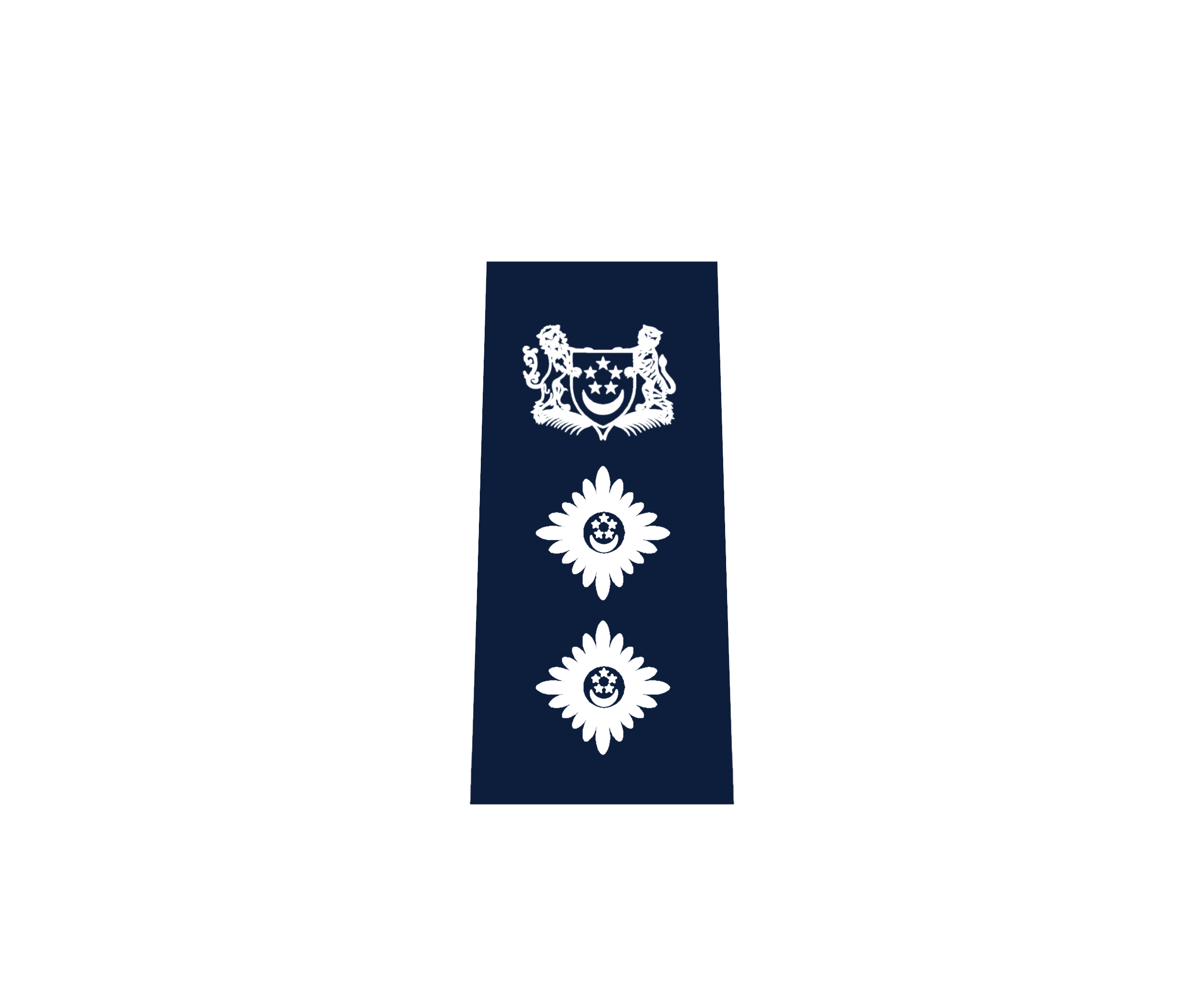
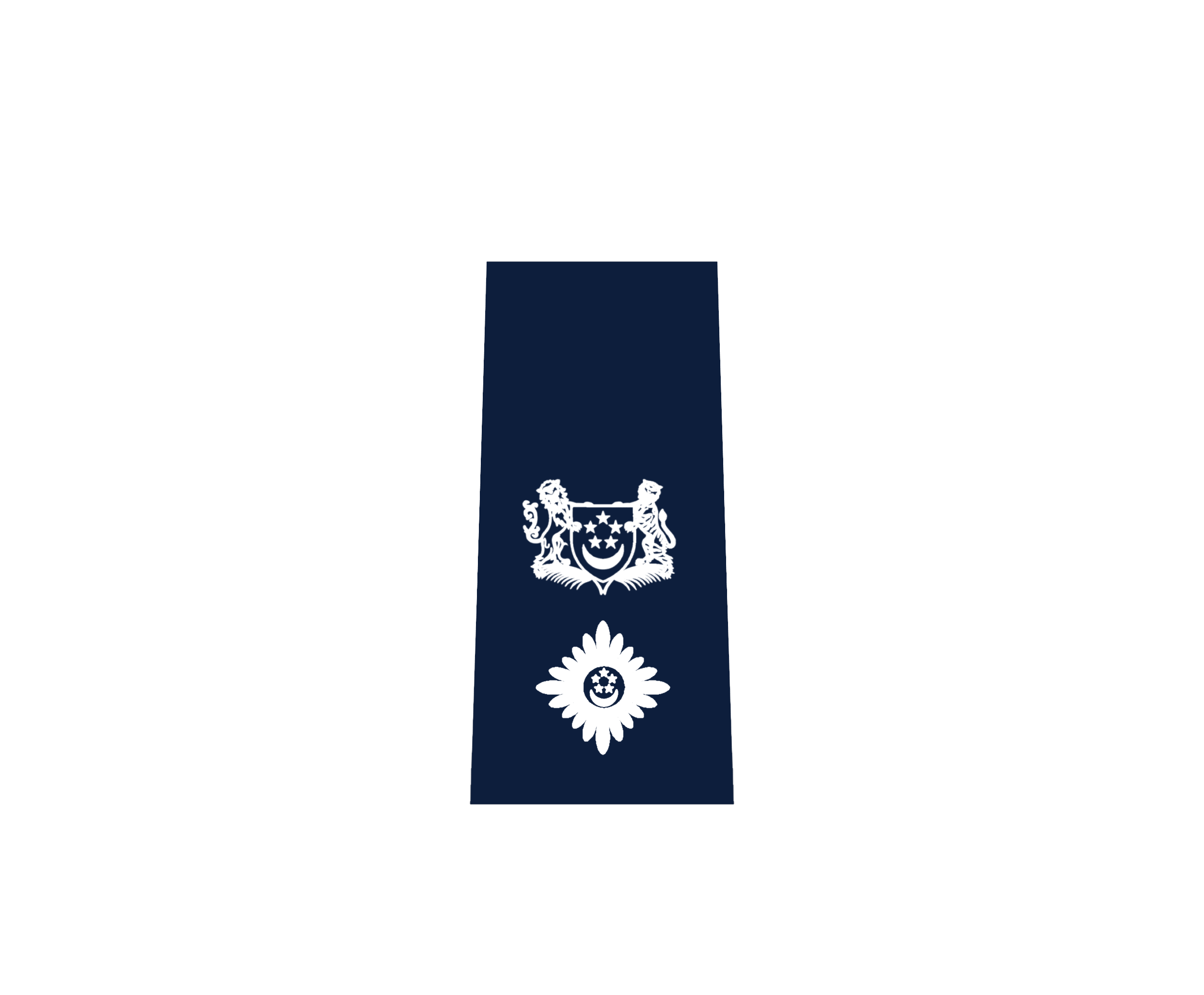
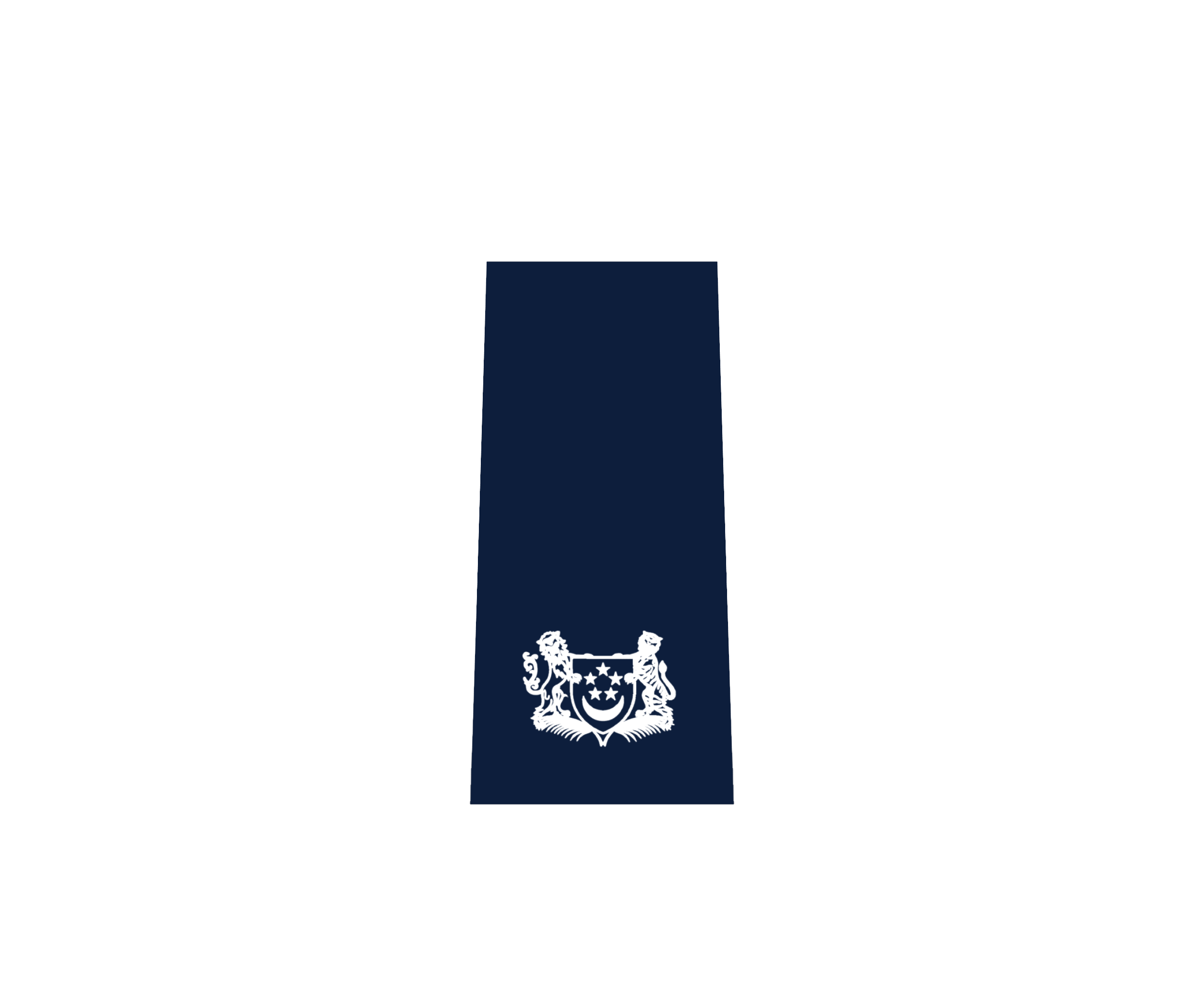
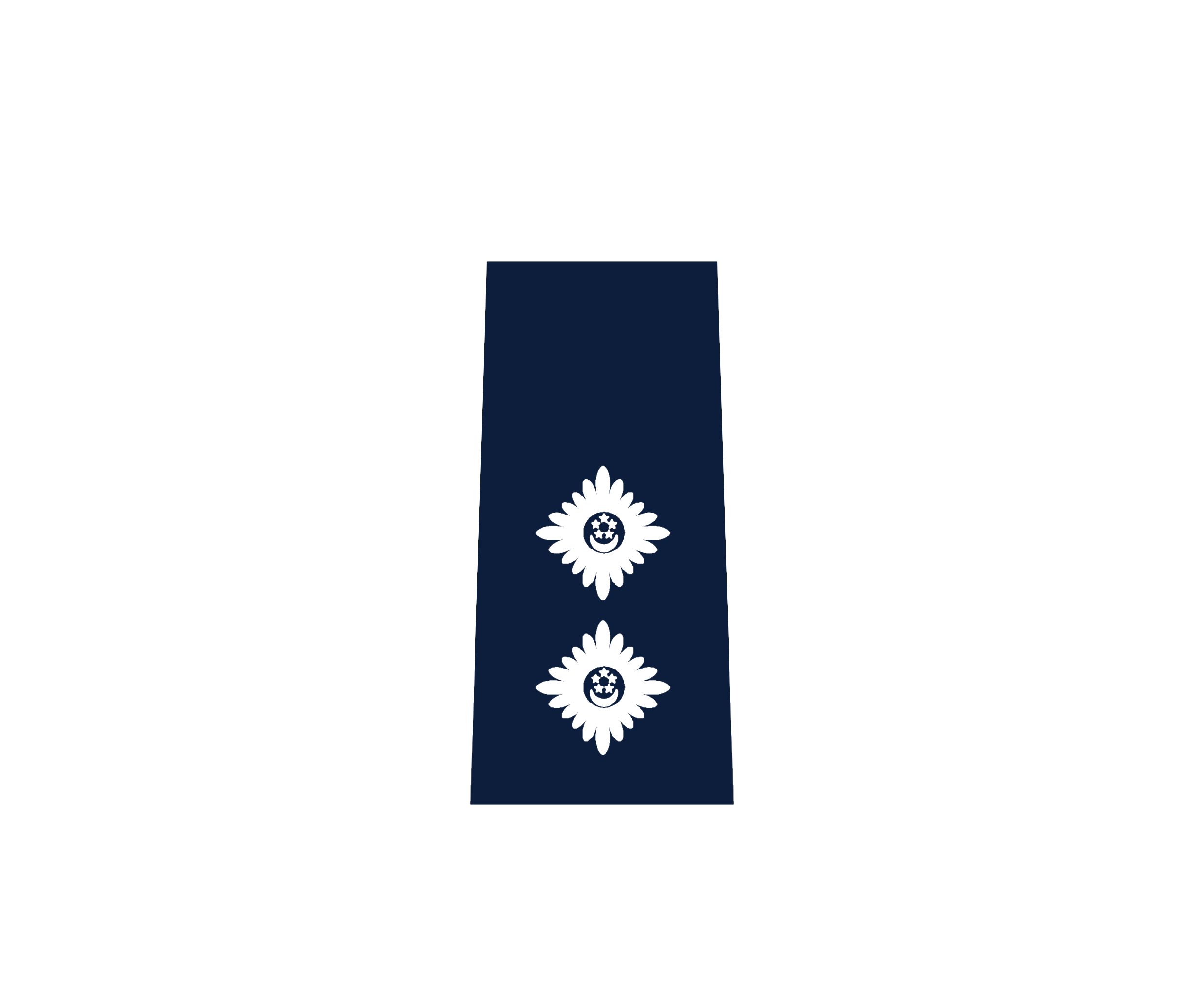
	Commissioners					Superintendents			Inspectors	Officer Cadets
Singapore Police Force
Singapore Police Force	Commissioner of police	Deputy commissioner of police	Senior assistant commissioner of police	Assistant commissioner of police	Deputy assistant commissioner of police	Superintendent of police	Deputy superintendent of police	Assistant superintendent of police	Inspector	Officer cadet, senior term	Officer cadet, junior term

Police officers

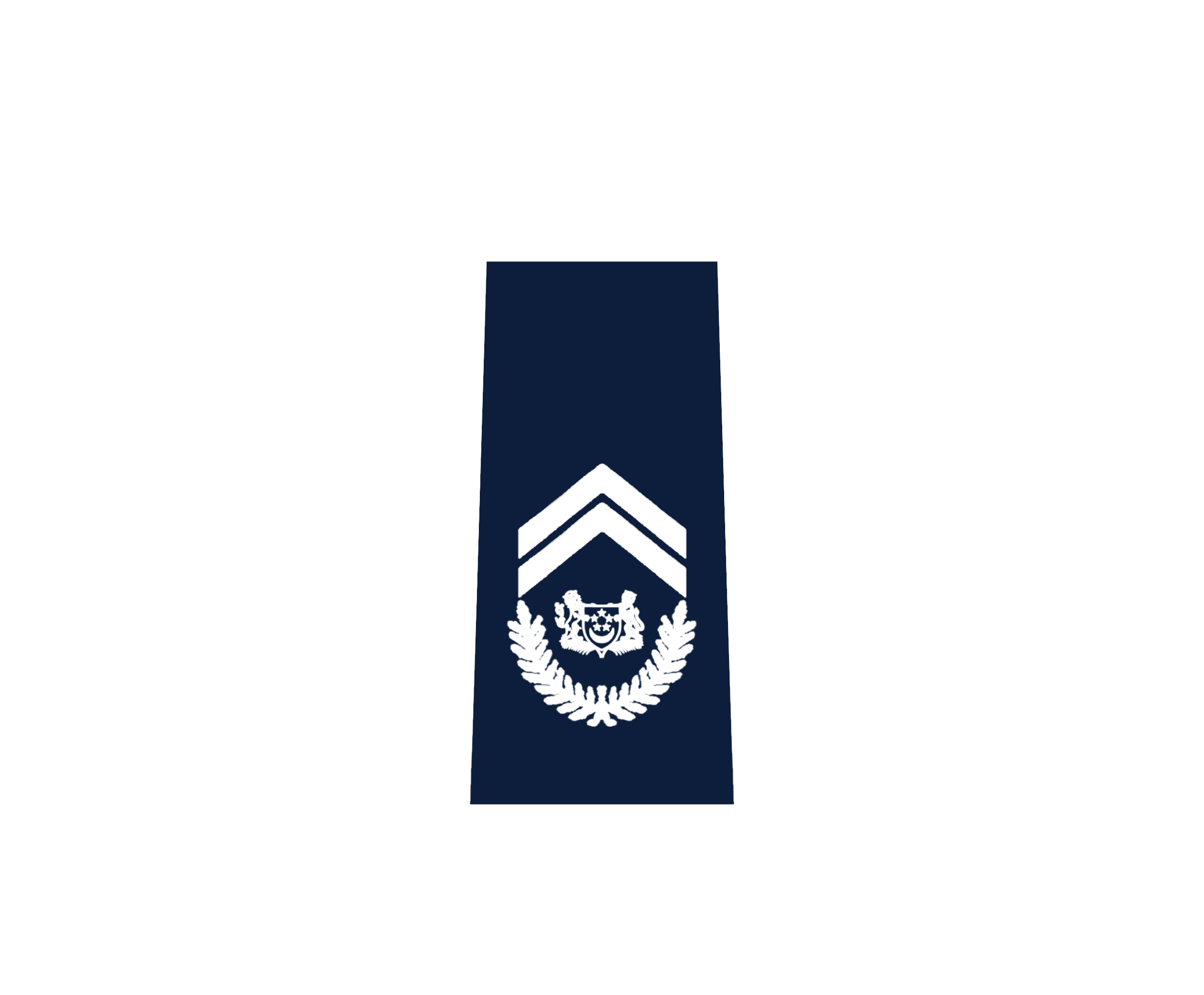
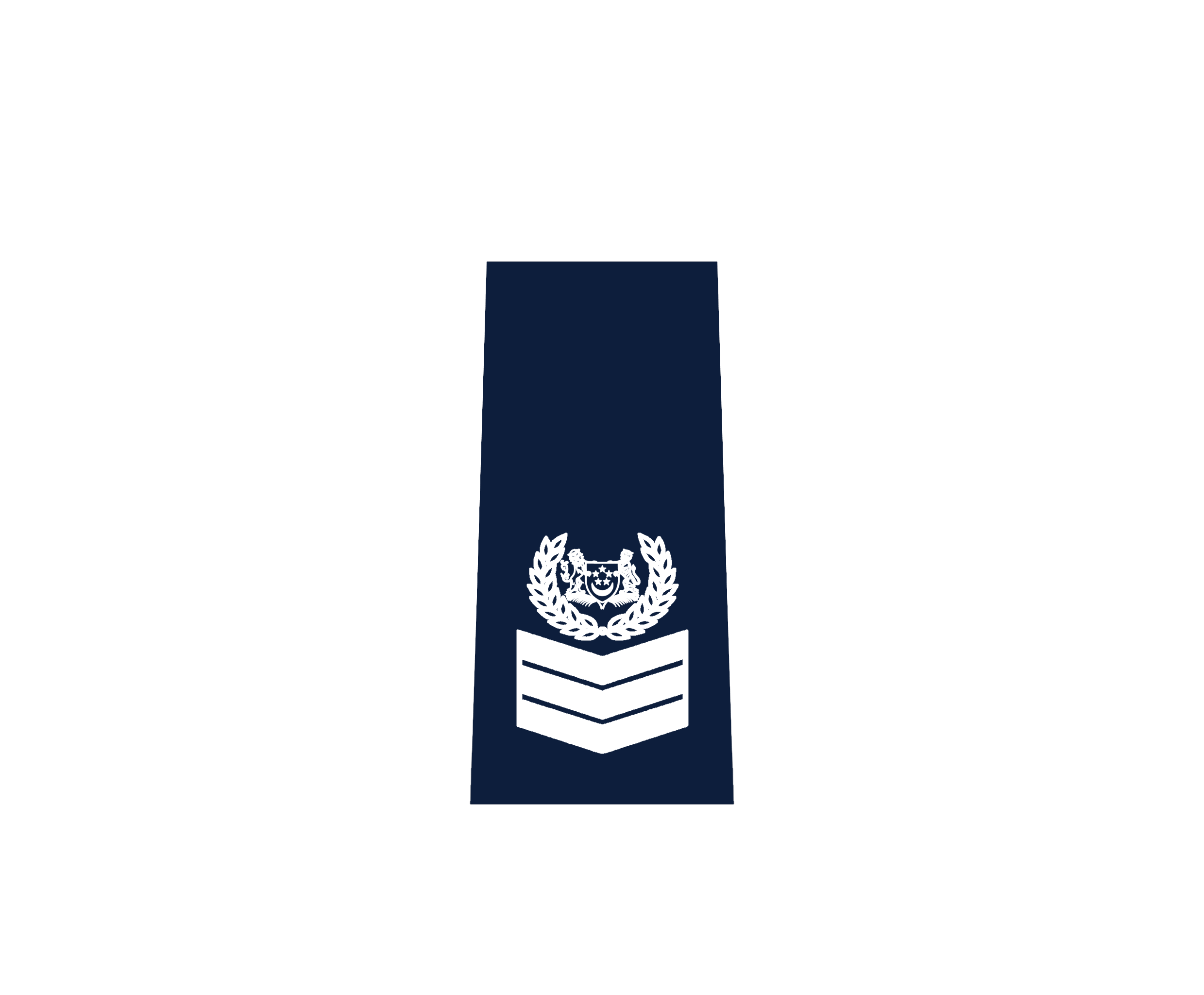
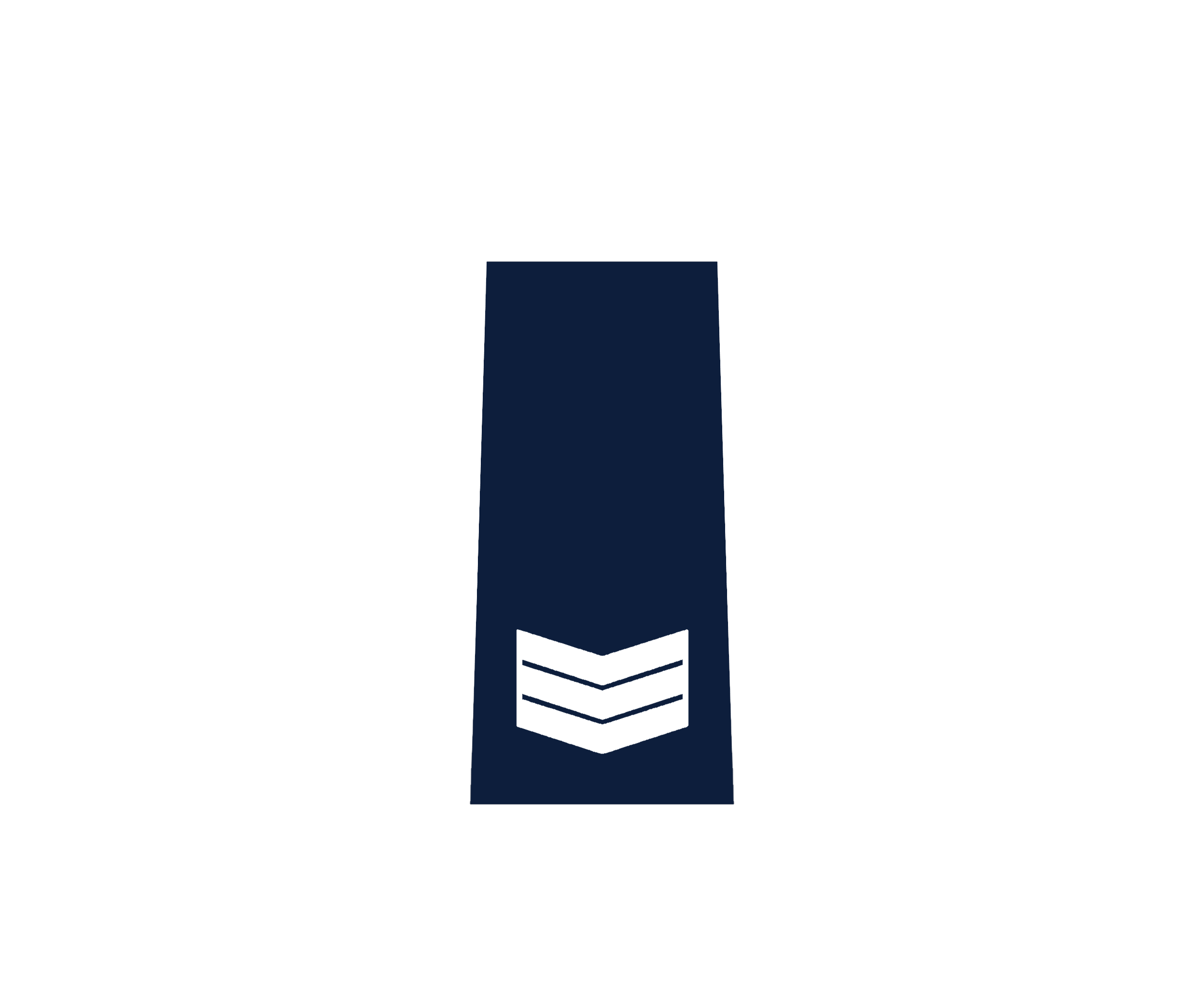
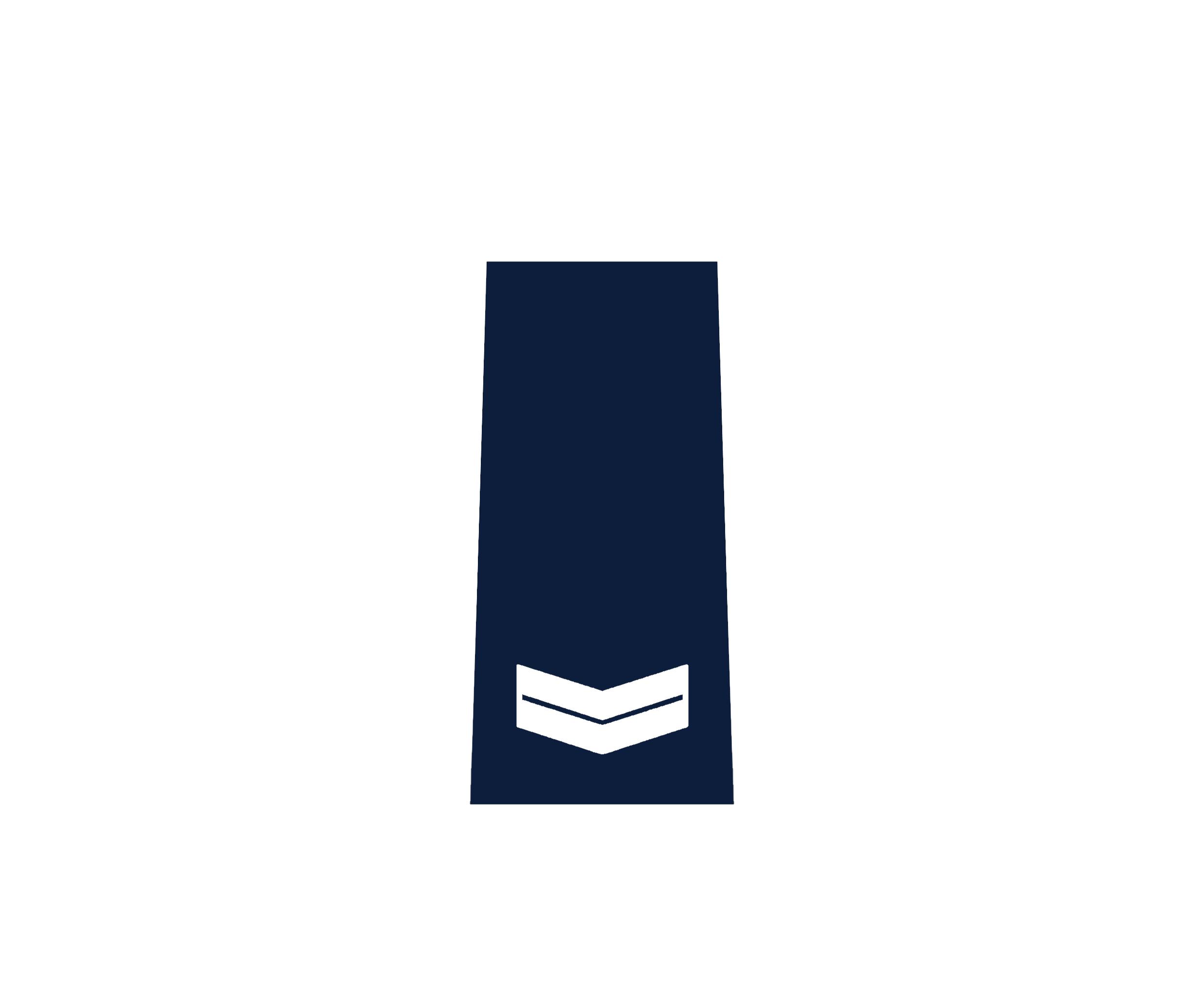
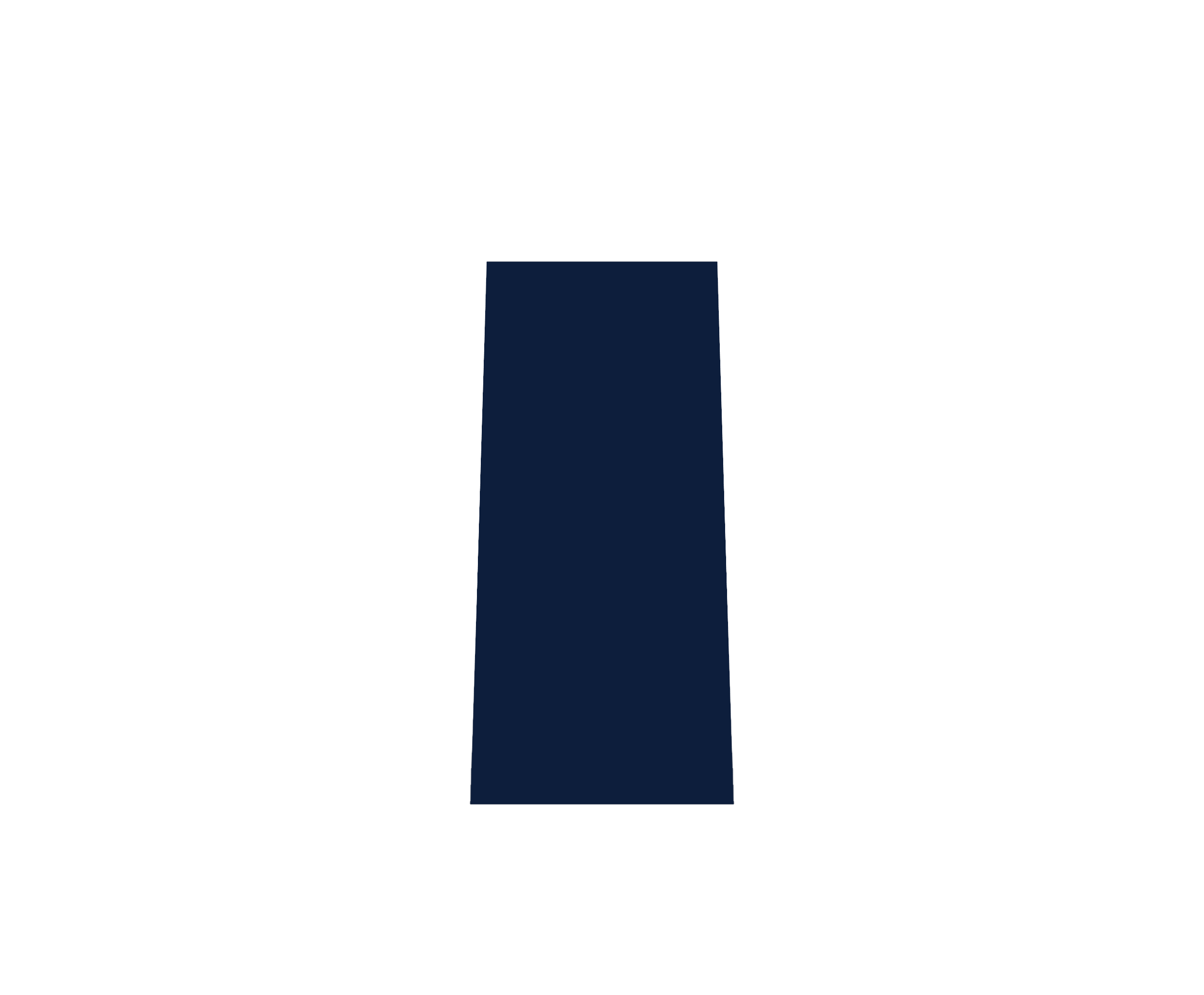
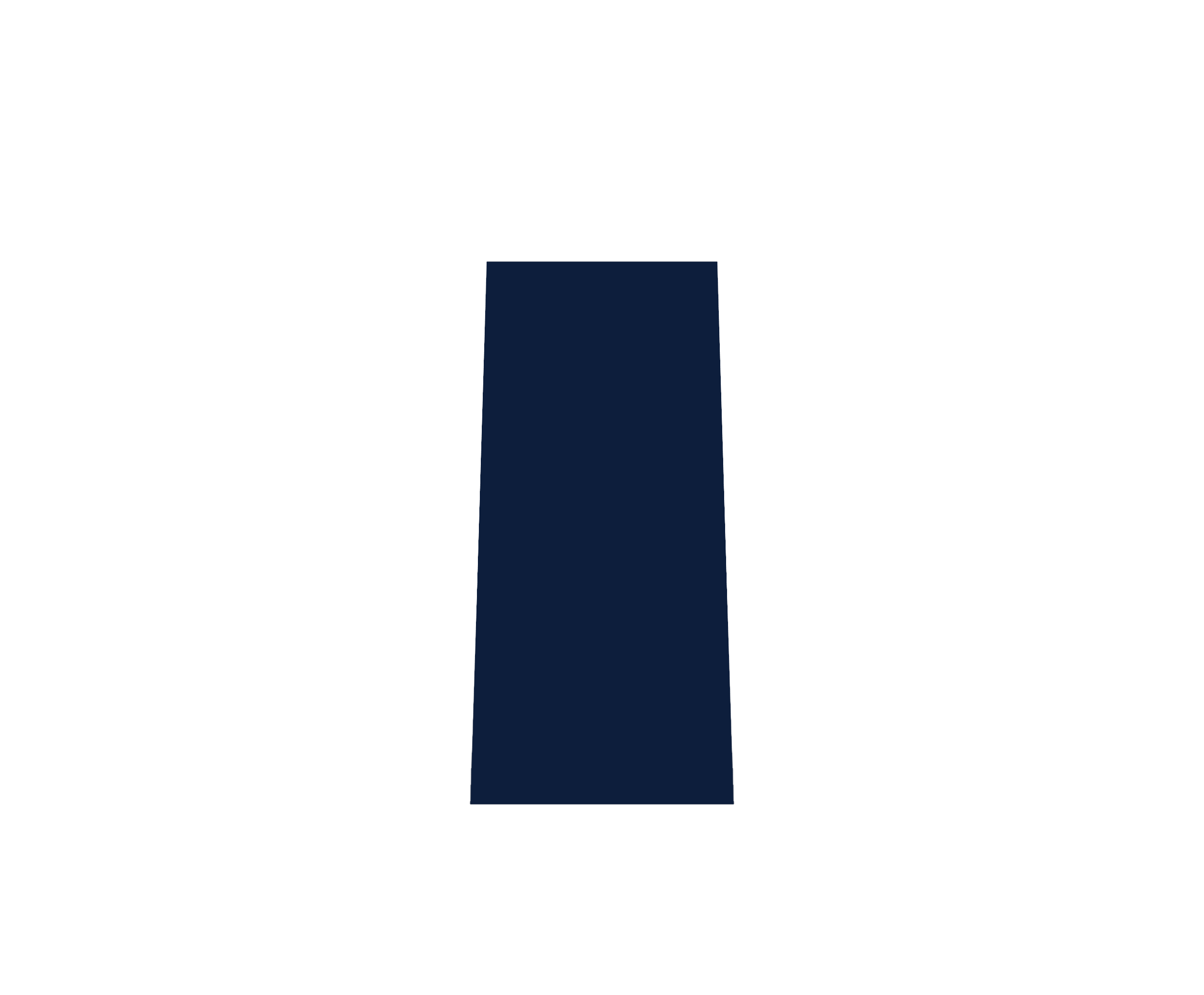
	Sergeants			Others
Singapore Police Force
Singapore Police Force	Station inspector	Senior staff sergeant	Sergeant	Corporal	Constable	Trainee

== Sri Lanka ==
Gazetted officers

	Senior gazetted officers						Junior gazetted officers
Sri Lanka Police
Sri Lanka Police	Inspector general of police (IGP)	Senior deputy inspector general of police (SDIG)	Deputy inspector general of police (DIG)	Senior superintendent of police (SSP)	Superintendent of police (SP)	Assistant superintendent of police (ASP)	Chief inspector of police (CIP)	Inspector of police (IP)	Sub inspector of police (SI)

Non-gazetted officers

	Sergeants			Constables
Sri Lanka Police
Sri Lanka Police	Police sergeant major (PSM)	Police sergeant class 1 (PS)	Police sergeant class 2 (PS)	Police constable class 1 (PC)	Police constable class 2 (PC)	Police constable class 3 (PC)	Police constable class 4 (PC)

== Republic of China (Taiwan) ==
National Police Agency

Insignia	Name	English
	警監特級	Police supervisor general
	警監一級	Police supervisor rank 1
	警監二級	Police supervisor rank 2
	警監三級	Police supervisor rank 3
	警監四級	Police supervisor rank 4
	警正一級	Police officer rank 1
	警正二級	Police officer rank 2
	警正三級	Police officer rank 3
	警正四級	Police officer rank 4
	警佐一級	Police rank 1
	警佐二級	Police rank 2
	警佐三級	Police rank 3
	警佐四級	Police rank 4

Republic of China Military Police

Rank group	General / flag officers		Senior officers			Junior officers
Republic of China Military Police
Republic of China Military Police	中將; Zhōngjiàng	少將; Shàojiàng	上校; Shàngxiào	中校; Zhōngxiào	少校; Shàoxiào	上尉; Shàngwèi	中尉; Zhōngwèi	少尉; Shàowèi

Rank group	Senior NCOs					Junior NCOs		Enlisted
Republic of China Military Police
Republic of China Military Police	一等士官長; Yīděng shìguānzhǎng	二等士官長; Èrděng shìguānzhǎng	三等士官長; Sānděng shìguānzhǎng	上士; Shàngshì	中士; Zhōngshì	下士; Xiàshì	上等兵; Shàngděngbīng	一等兵; Yīděngbīng	二等兵; Èrděngbīng

== Thailand ==
Commissioned officers

Rank group	General/flag officers				Senior officers			Junior officers
Royal Thai Police
Royal Thai Police	พลตำรวจเอก; Phon Tam Ruad Ek	พลตำรวจโท; Phon Tam Ruad Tho	พลตำรวจตรี Phon Tam Ruad Tri		พันตำรวจเอก; Phan Tam Ruad Ek	พันตำรวจโท; Phan Tam Ruad Tho	พันตำรวจตรี Phan Tam Ruad Tri	ร้อยตำรวจเอก; Roi Tam Ruad Ek	ร้อยตำรวจโท; Roi Tam Ruad Tho	ร้อยตำรวจตรี Roi Tam Ruad Tri	นักเรียนนายร้อยตำรวจ; Nak Rian Nai Roi Tam Ruad
English	Police general	Police lieutenant general	Police major general	Police Brigadier General (no longer used) (replaced by police senior colonel)	Police colonel	Police lieutenant colonel	Police major	Police captain	Police lieutenant	Police sub-lieutenant	Police cadet officer

Other

Rank group	Senior NCOs			Junior NCOs		Enlisted
Royal Thai Police						No insignia
Royal Thai Police	ดาบตำรวจ; Dap Tamruat	จ่าสิบตำรวจ; Cha Sip Tamruat	สิบตำรวจเอก; Sip Tamruat Ek	สิบตำรวจโท; Sip Tamruat Tho	สิบตำรวจตรี Sip Tamruat Tri	พลตำรวจ; Phon Tamruat
English	Police sergeant major	Police staff sergeant	Police sergeant	Police corporal	Police lance corporal	Police constable

== United Arab Emirates ==
=== Abu Dhabi ===
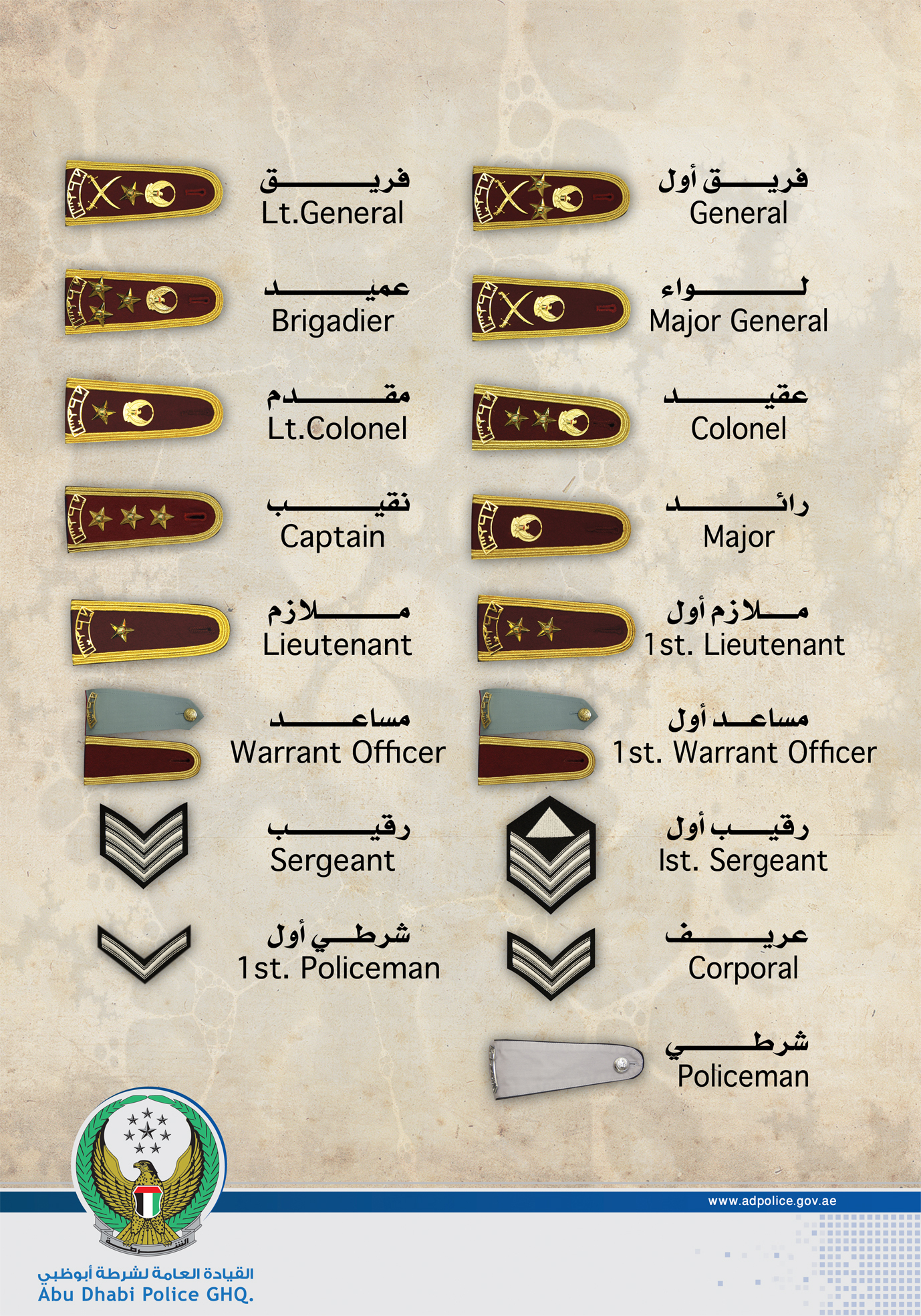
Abu Dhabi Police ranks - click to enlarge

== Vietnam ==
Students and officers

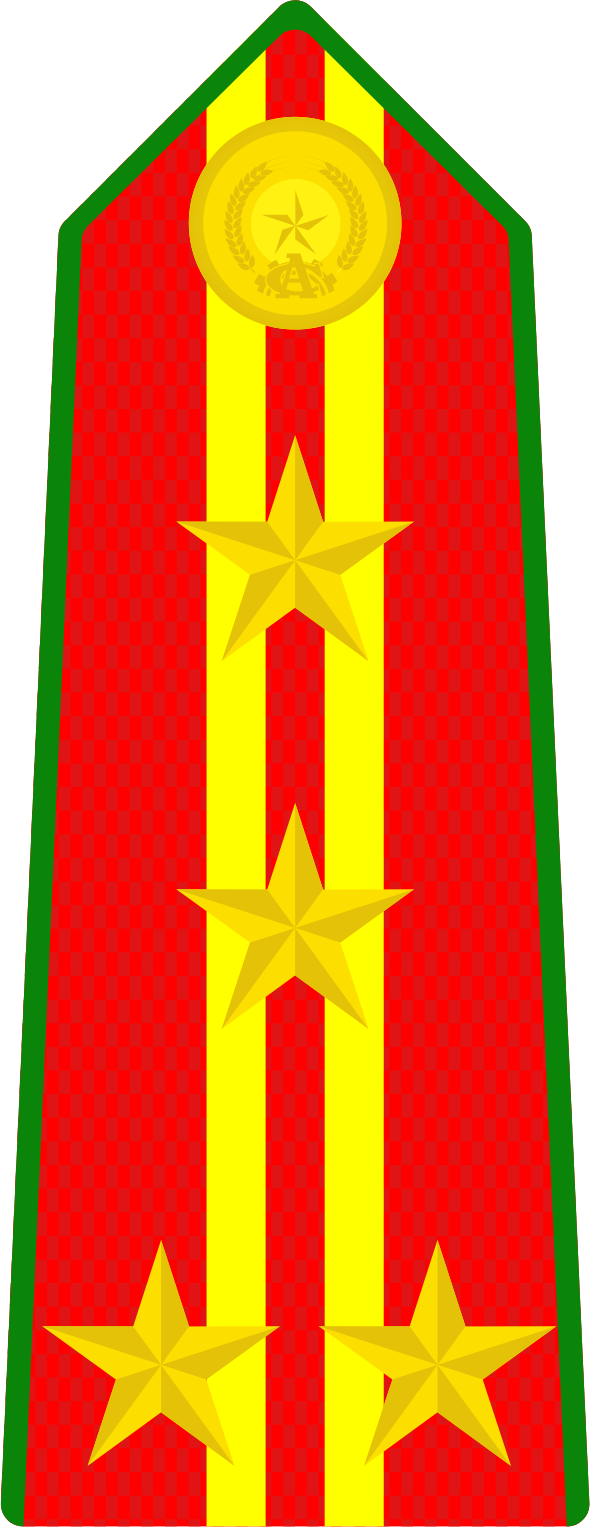
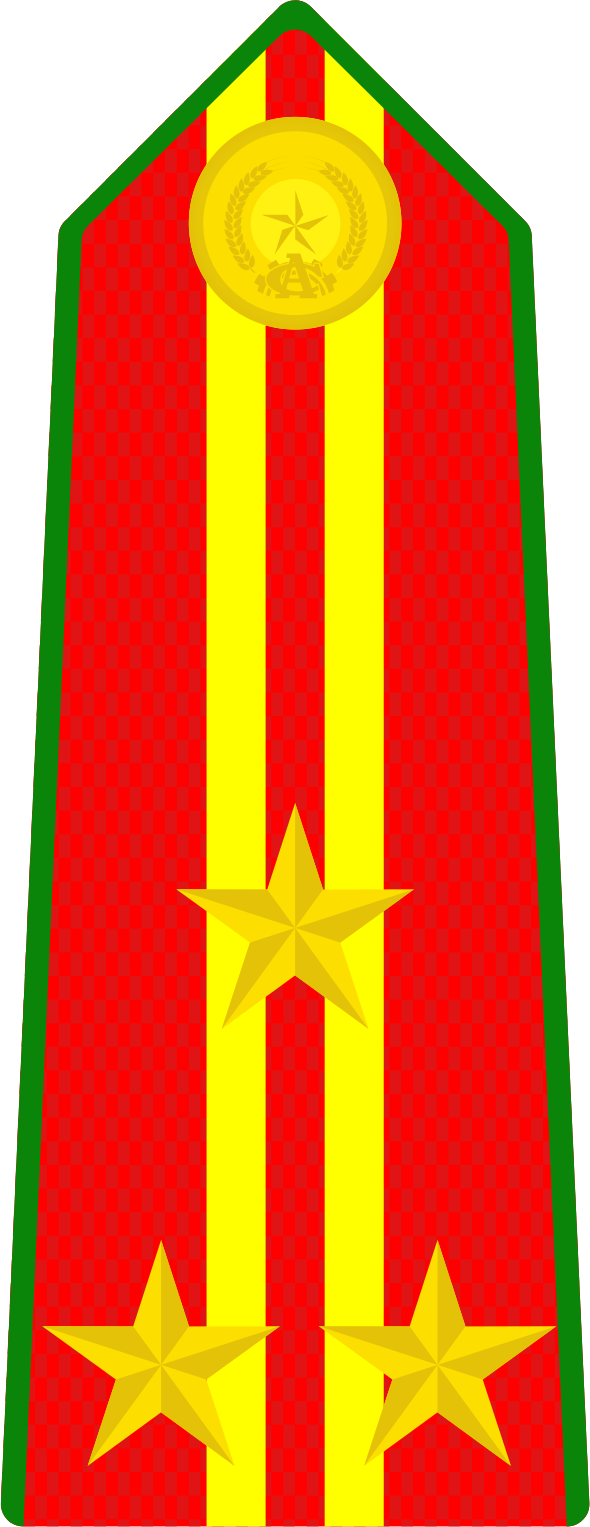
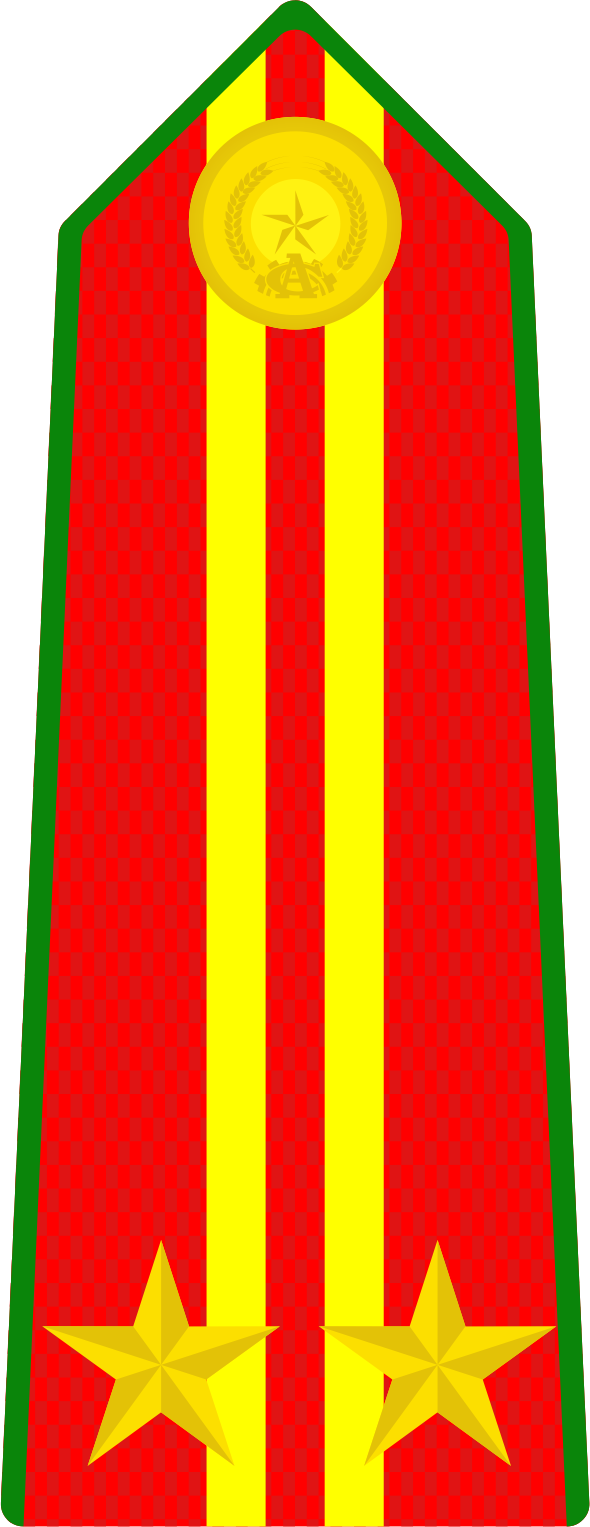
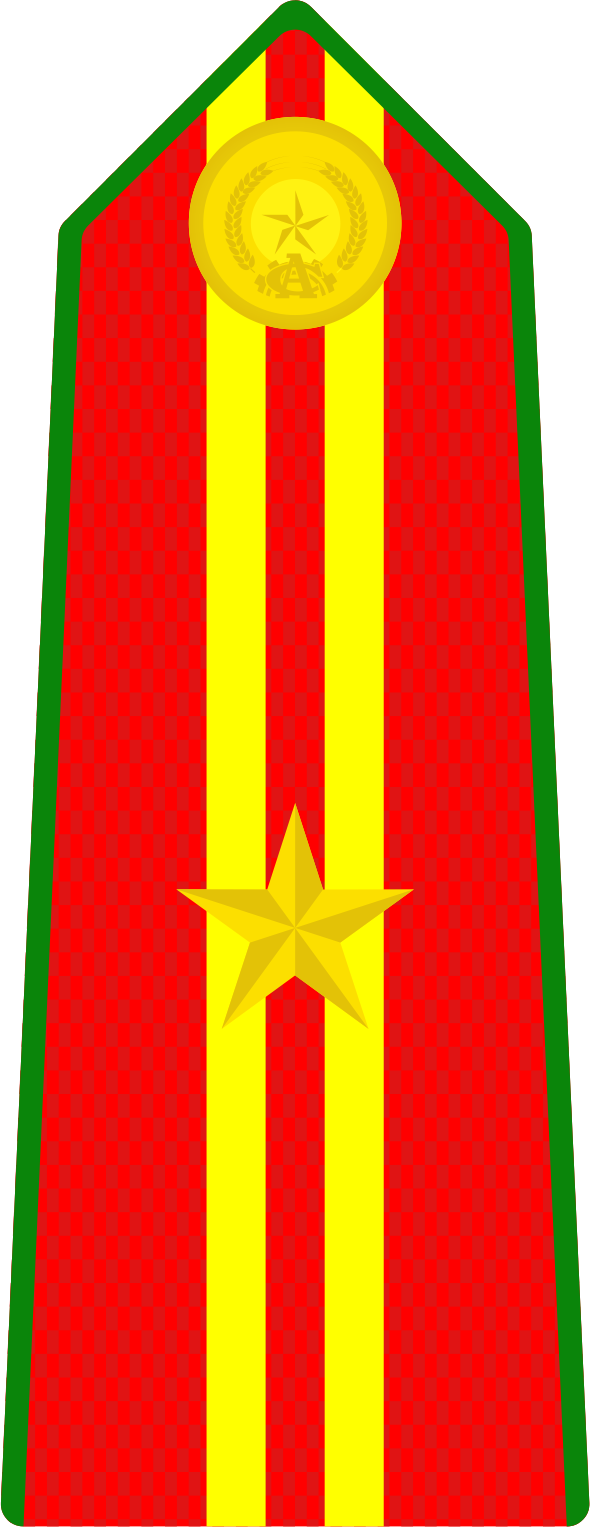
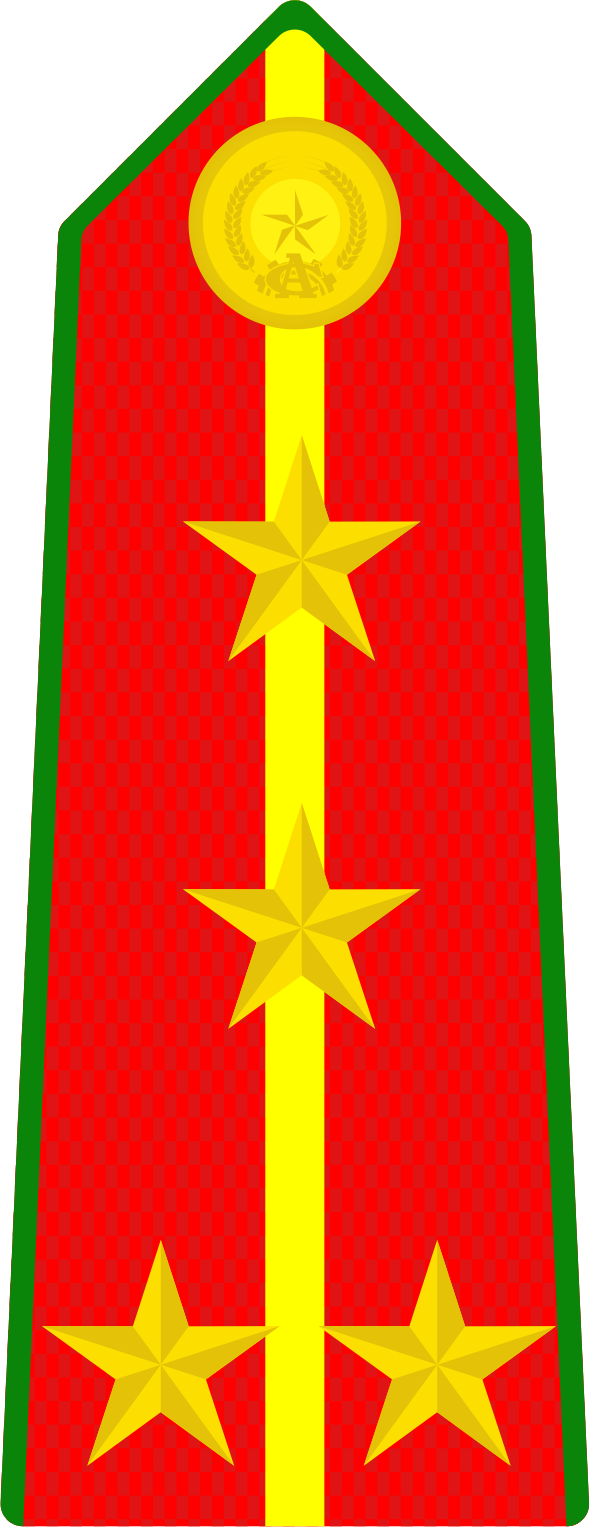
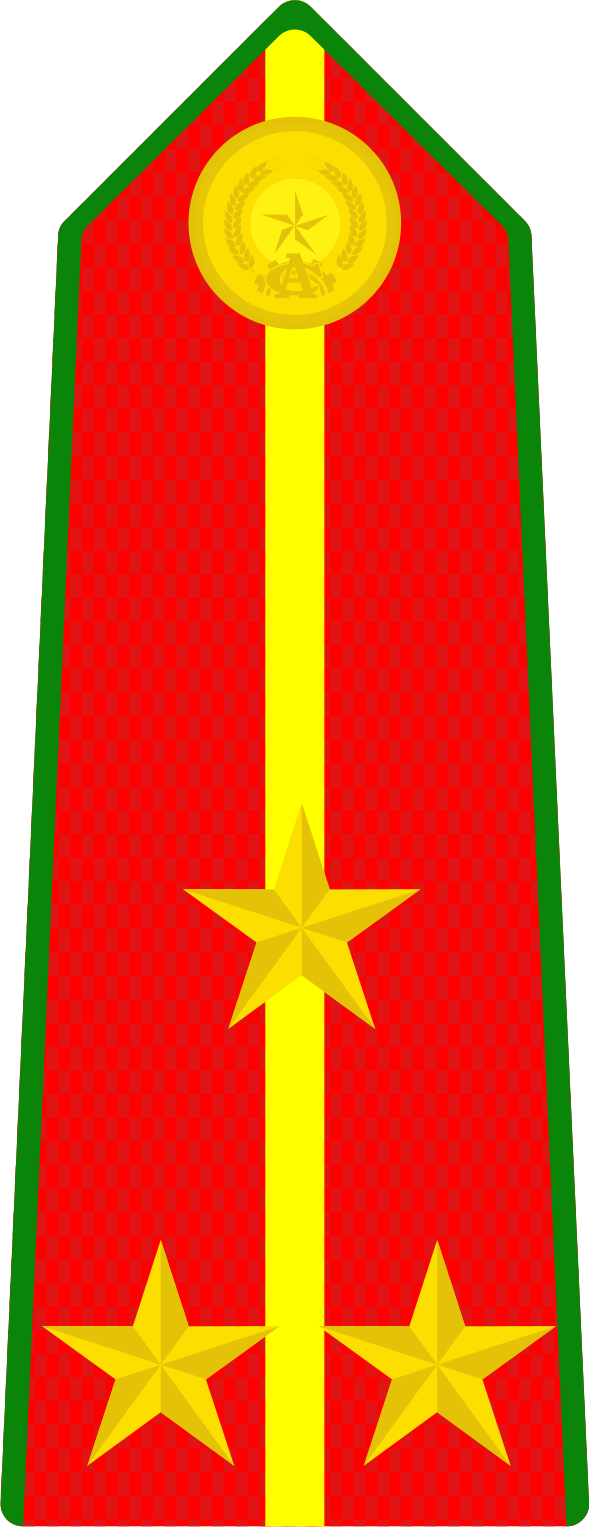
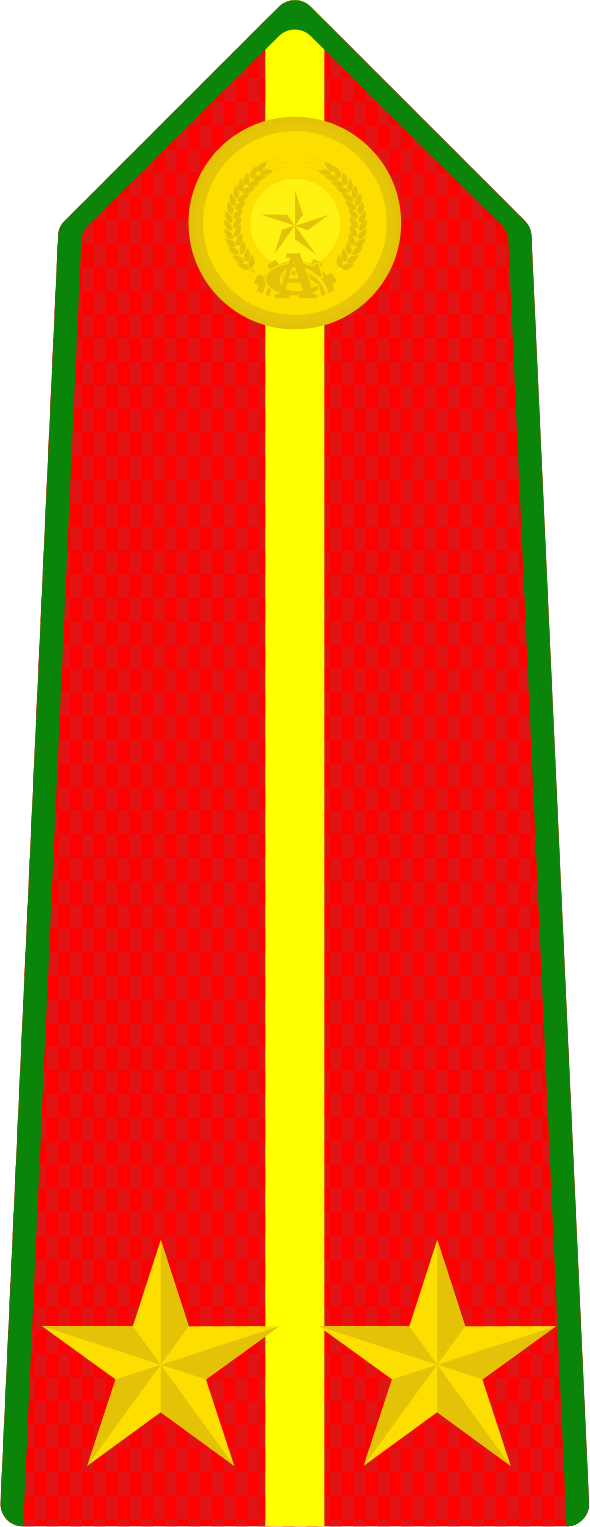
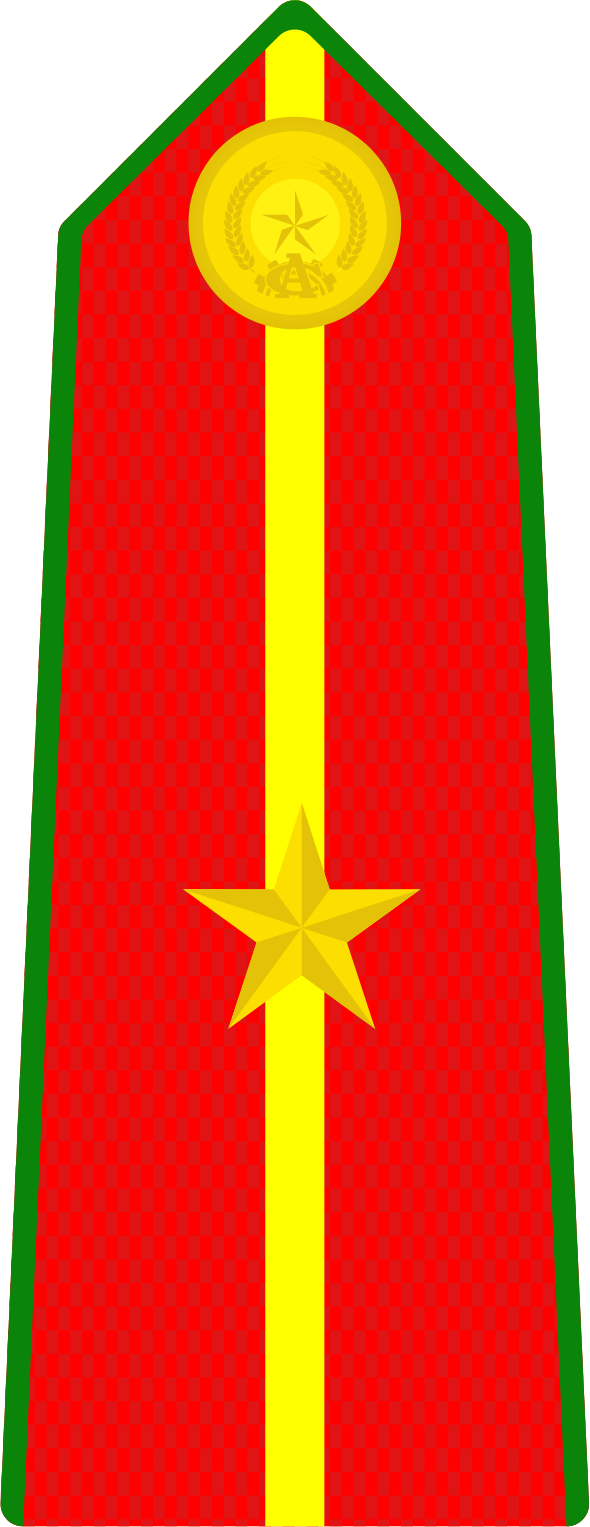
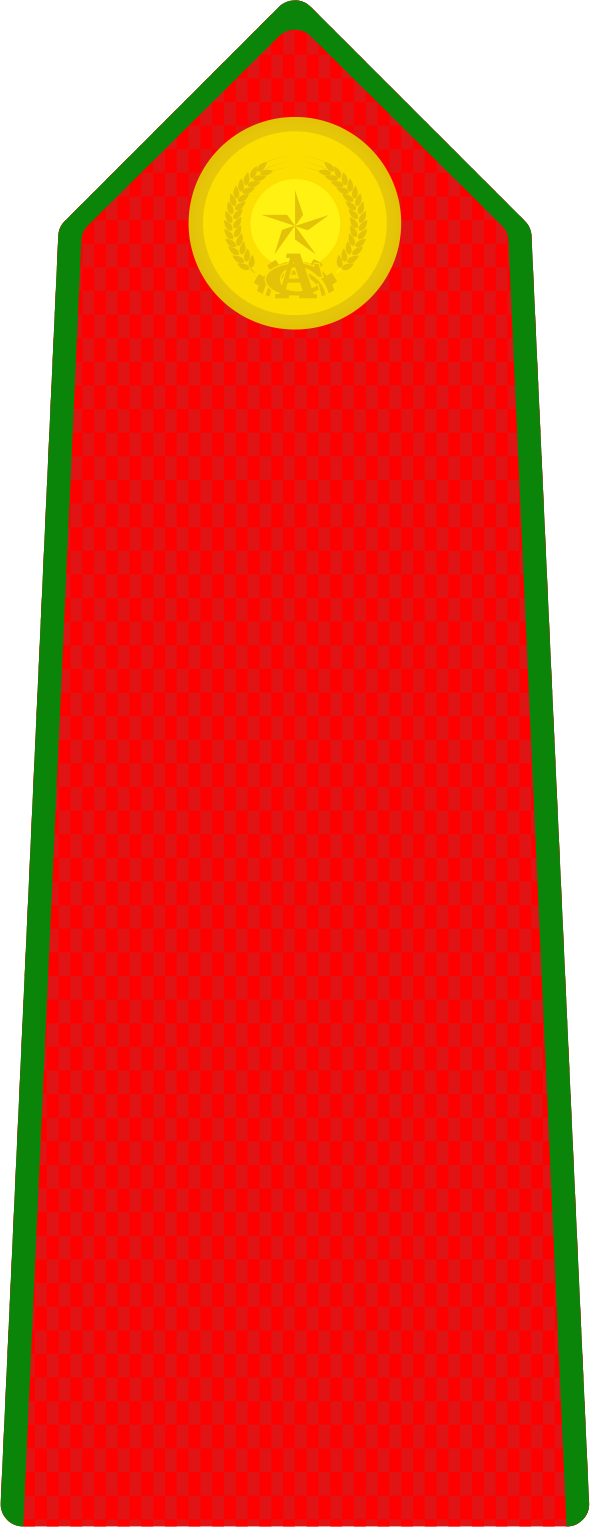
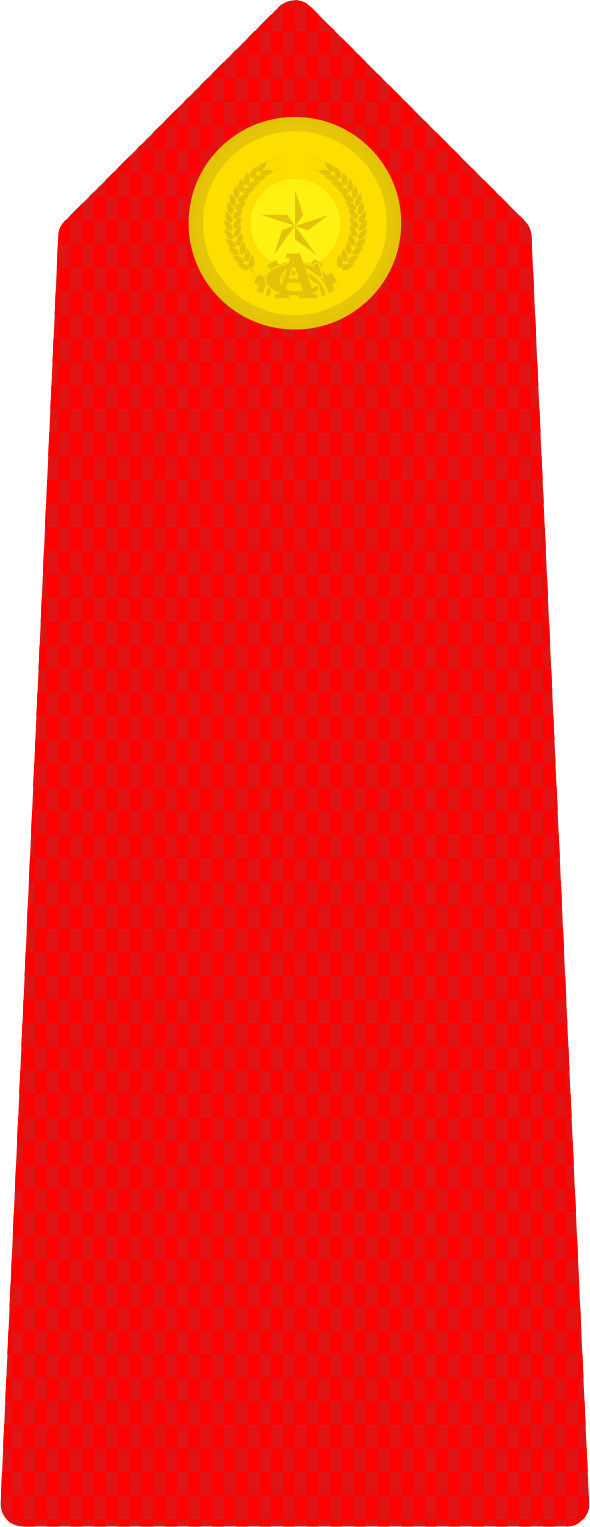
Rank group	General / flag officers				Senior officers				Junior officers
	Highest officer rank			Middle officer rank					Lower officer rank				Student
Vietnam People's; Public Security
Vietnam People's; Public Security	General (Đại tướng)	Colonel general (Thượng tướng)	Lieutenant general (Trung tướng)	Major general (Thiếu tướng)	Senior colonel (Đại tá)	Colonel (Thượng tá)	Lieutenant colonel (Trung tá)	Major (Thiếu tá)	Captain (Đại úy)	Senior lieutenant (Thượng úy)	Lieutenant (Trung úy)	Second lieutenant (Thiếu úy)	University - college cadet (Học viên Đại học - Cao đẳng)	Intermediate - primary student (Học viên Trung cấp - Sơ cấp)

NCOs and enlisted

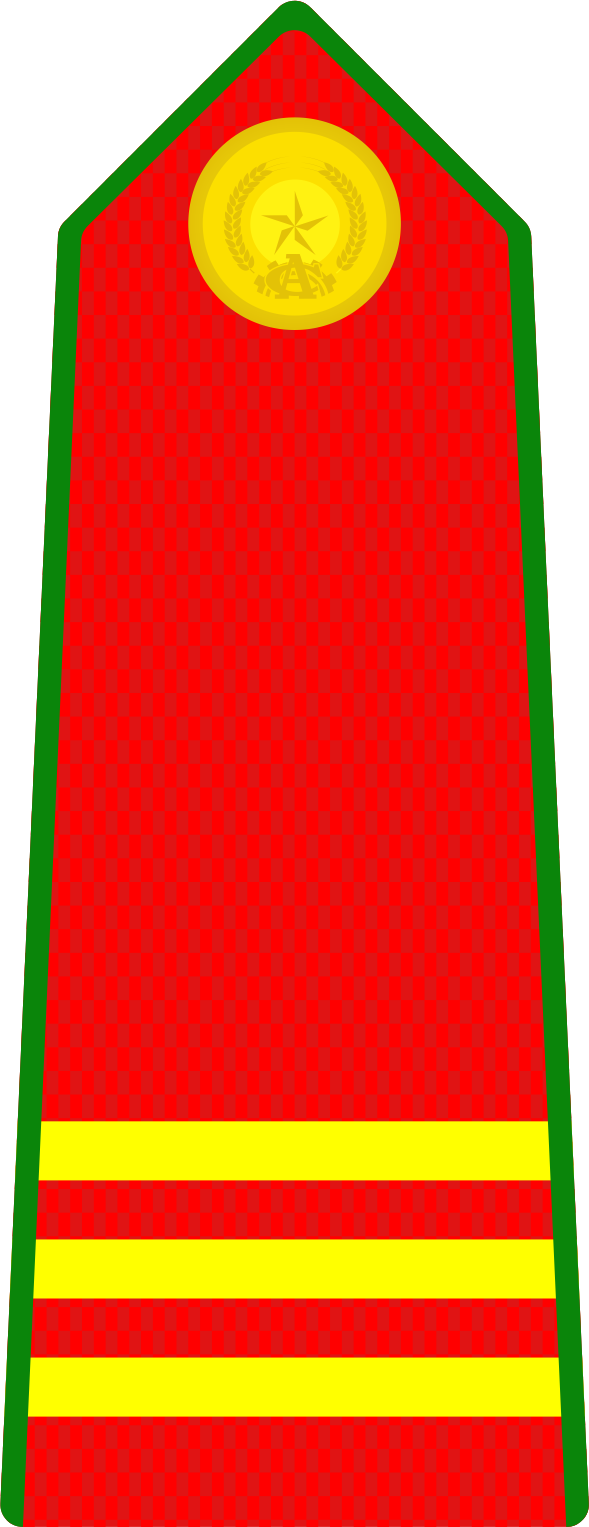
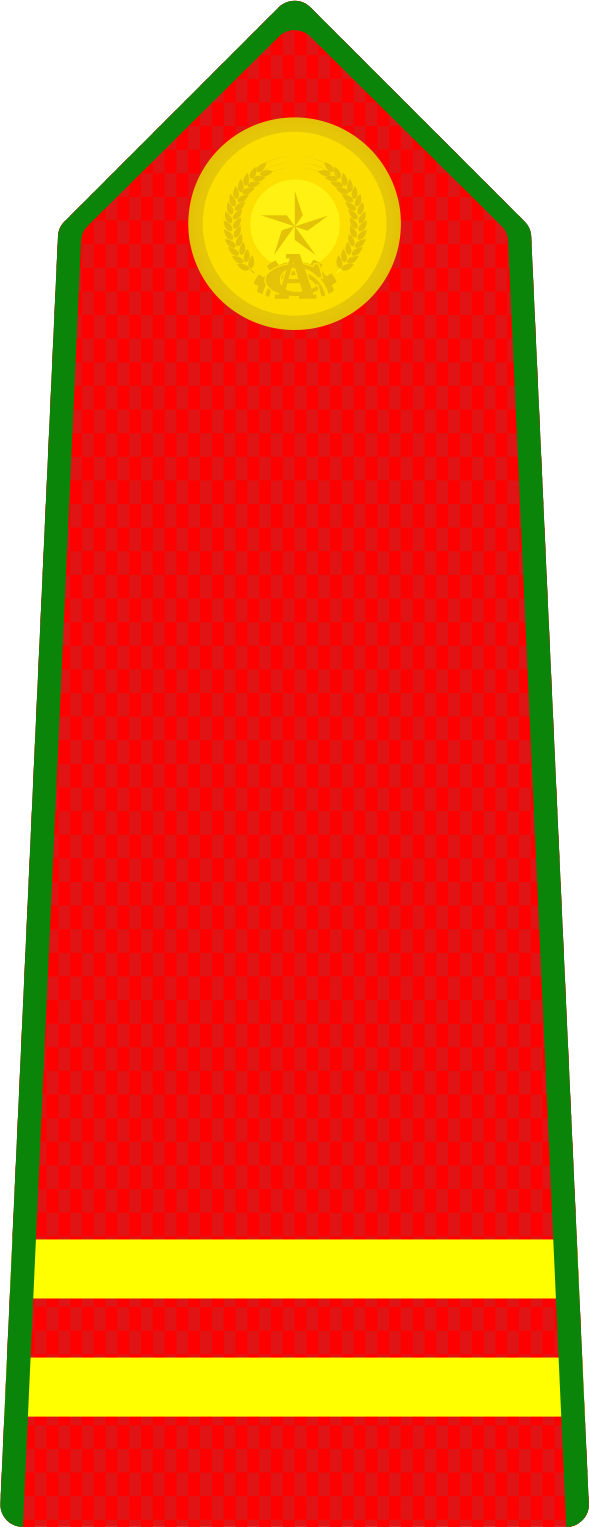
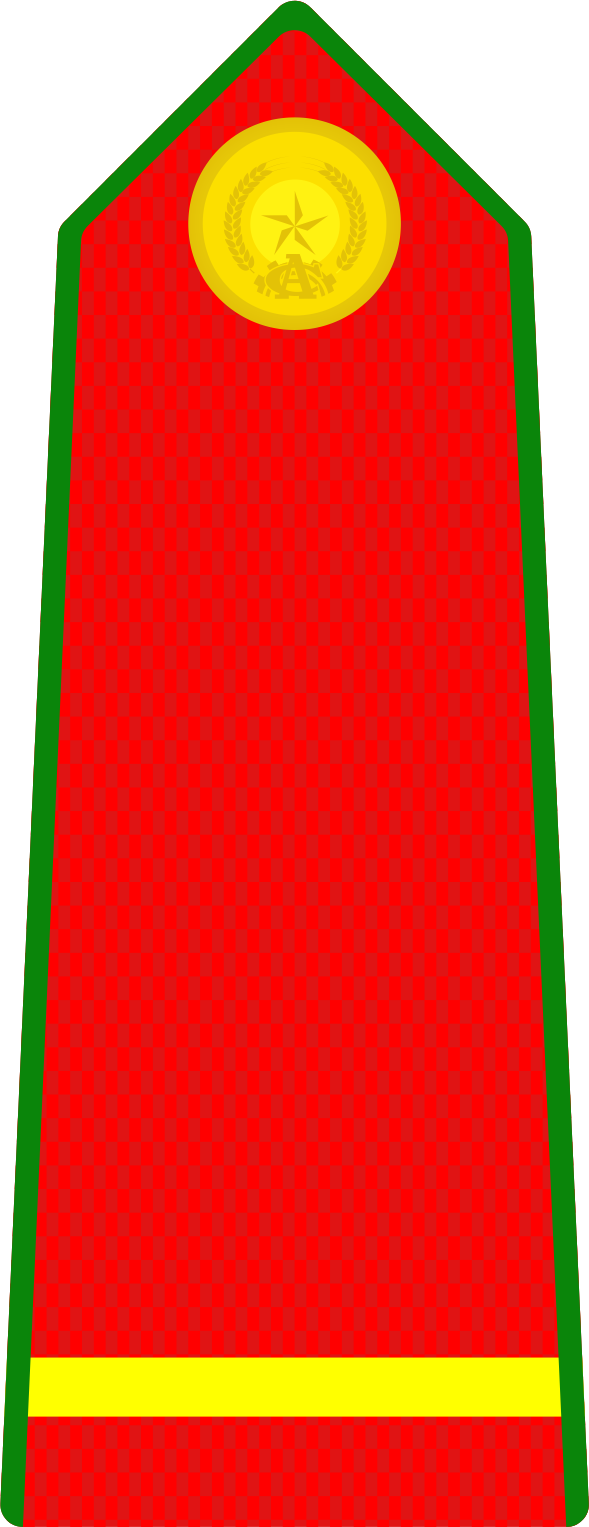
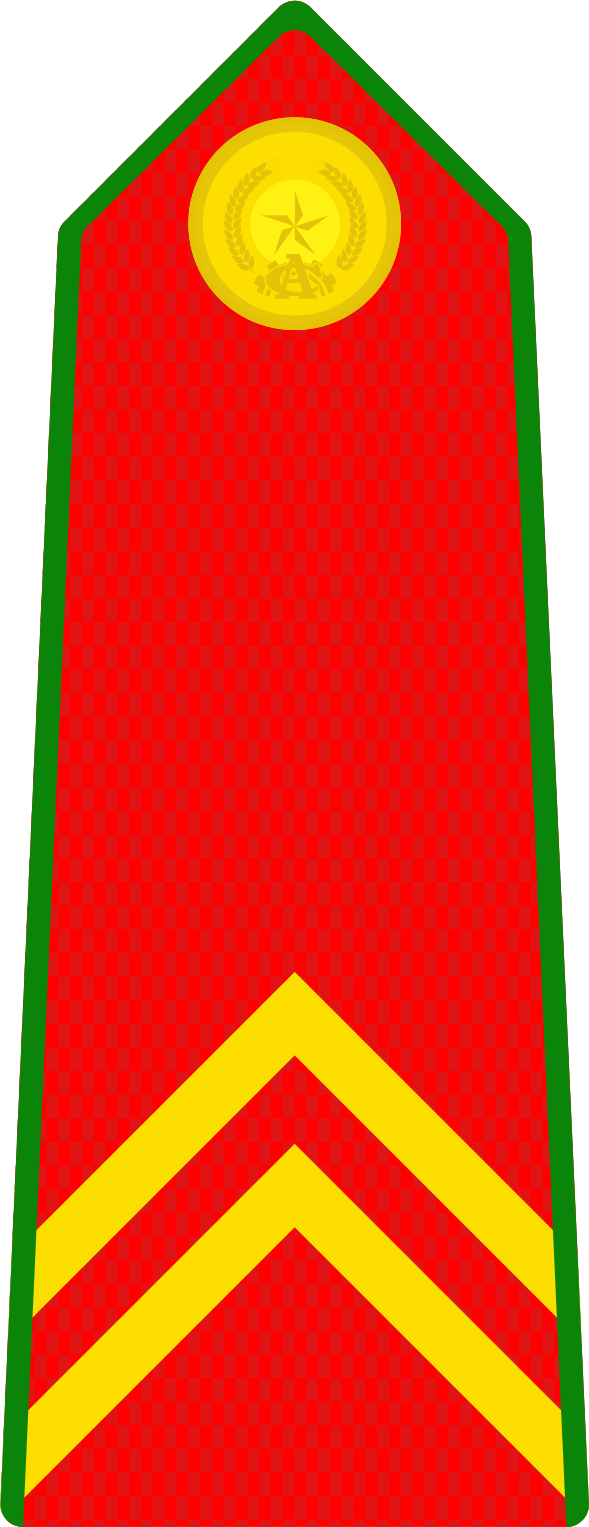
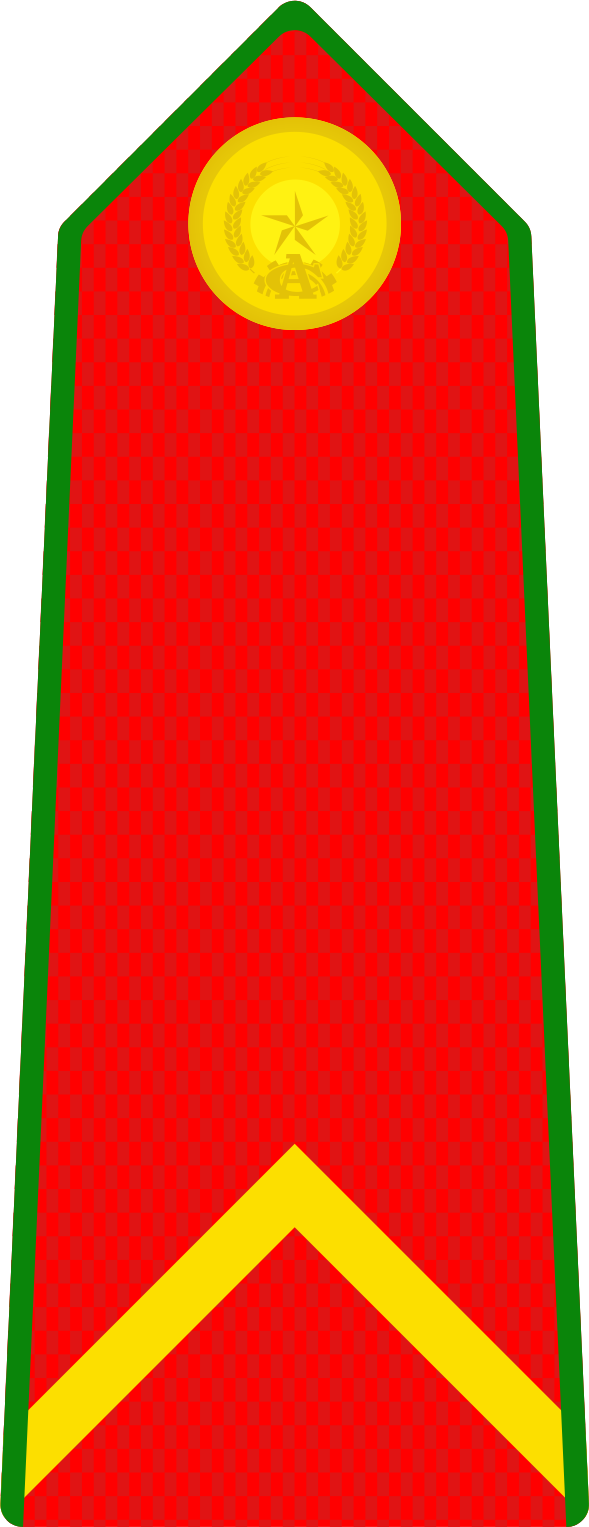
Rank group	Senior NCOs		Junior NCOs	Enlisted
	Non-commissioned officers			Policemen
Vietnam People's; Public Security
Vietnam People's; Public Security	Master sergeant (Thượng sĩ)	Sergeant (Trung sĩ)	Corporal (Hạ sĩ)	Constable 1st class (Chiến sĩ bậc 1)	Constable 2nd class (Chiến sĩ bậc 2)

== See also ==
- List of police ranks
- List of police ranks in Africa
- List of police ranks in Europe
- List of police ranks in Oceania
- List of police ranks in the Americas
- Military rank
- Fire department ranks by country
- Ranks and insignia of gendarmeries
