= List of police ranks in Europe =

Police ranks are a system of hierarchical relationships in police organizations. The rank system defines authority and responsibility in a police organization, and affects the culture within the police force. Police ranks, dependent on country, are similar to military ranks in function and design due to policing in many countries developing from military organizations and operations, such as in Western Europe, former Soviet countries, and English-speaking countries. Usually, uniforms denote the bearer's rank by particular insignia affixed to the uniforms.

Rank is not only used to designate leadership, but to establish pay-grade as well. As rank increases, pay-grade follows, but so does the amount of responsibility.

== Albania ==
	Director				Commissioner
Albanian Police
Albanian Police	Drejtues madhor Chief director	Drejtues i lartë Senior director	Drejtues i parë First director	Drejtues; Director	Kryekomisar; Chief commissioner	Komisar; Commissioner	Nënkomisar; Sub-commissioner	Inspektor; Inspector	Kursantë; Cadet

== Andorra ==
	Superior level		Executive level		Intermediate level			Basic level
Police Corps of Andorra
Police Corps of Andorra	Commissari major	Commisari	Oficial de 1a classe	Oficial de 2a classe	Sotsoficial major	Sotsoficial de 1a classe	Sotsoficial de 2a classe	Agent major	Agent

== Armenia ==
=== Officers ===
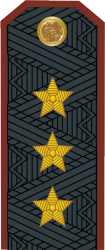
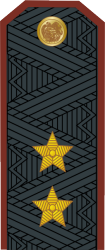
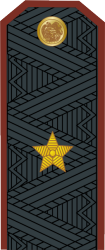
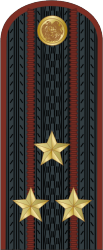
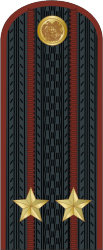
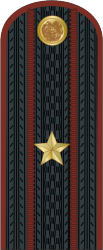
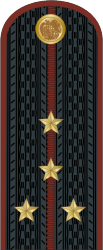
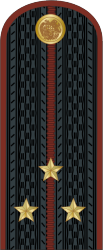
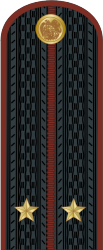
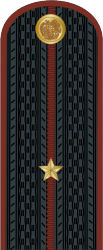
Rank group	General / flag officers			Senior officers			Junior officers
Police of Armenia
Police of Armenia	Police colonel general	Police lieutenant general	Police major general	Police colonel	Police lieutenant colonel	Police major	Police captain	Senior police lieutenant	Police lieutenant	Junior police lieutenant	Police; Kursant

=== Enlisted ===
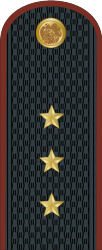
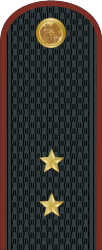
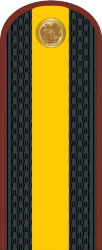
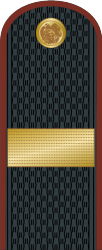
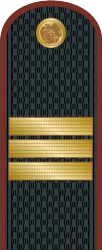
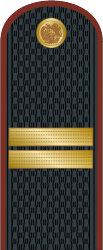
Rank group	Senior NCOs					Junior NCOs	Enlisted
Police of Armenia								No insignia
Police of Armenia	Senior police warrant officer	Police warrant officer	Police Starshina	Police senior sergeant	Police sergeant	Police junior sergeant	Police private	Cadet

== Austria ==
Commissioners

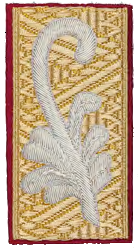
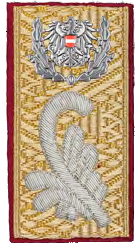
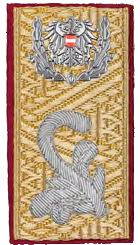
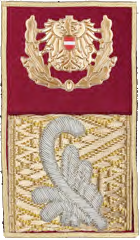
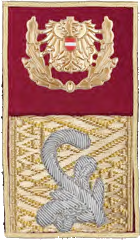
(Austria) Austrian Federal Police
(Austria) Austrian Federal Police	Generaldirektor für die öffentliche Sicherheit	Landespolizei- Direktor	Landespolizei- Direktor-Stellvertreter	Abteilungsleiter Landespolizei- direktion	Stadthauptmann
(Austria) Austrian Federal Police	Director general of public security	State police director	Deputy state police director	Department chief of the state police	City police captain

Leading officers

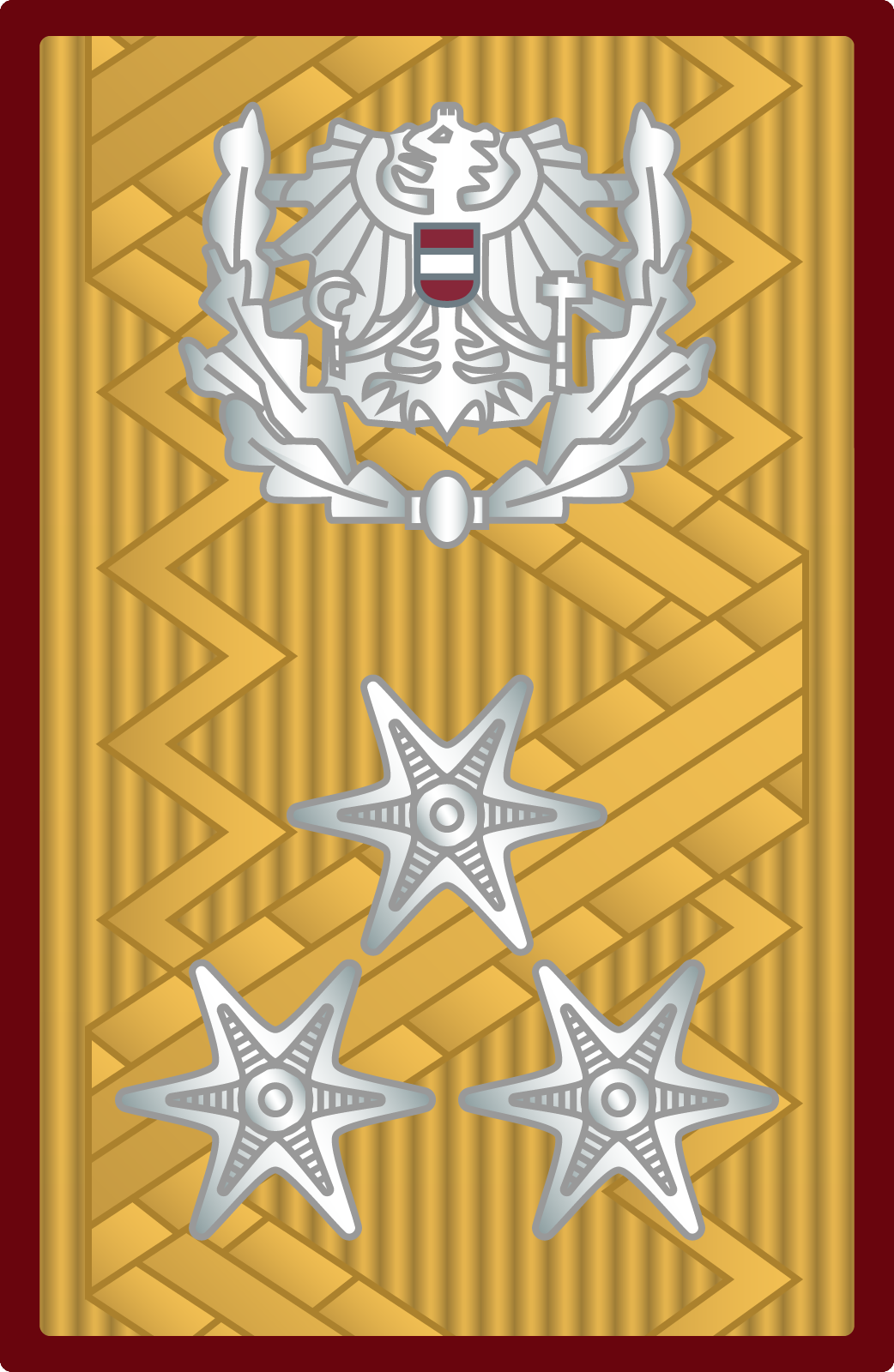
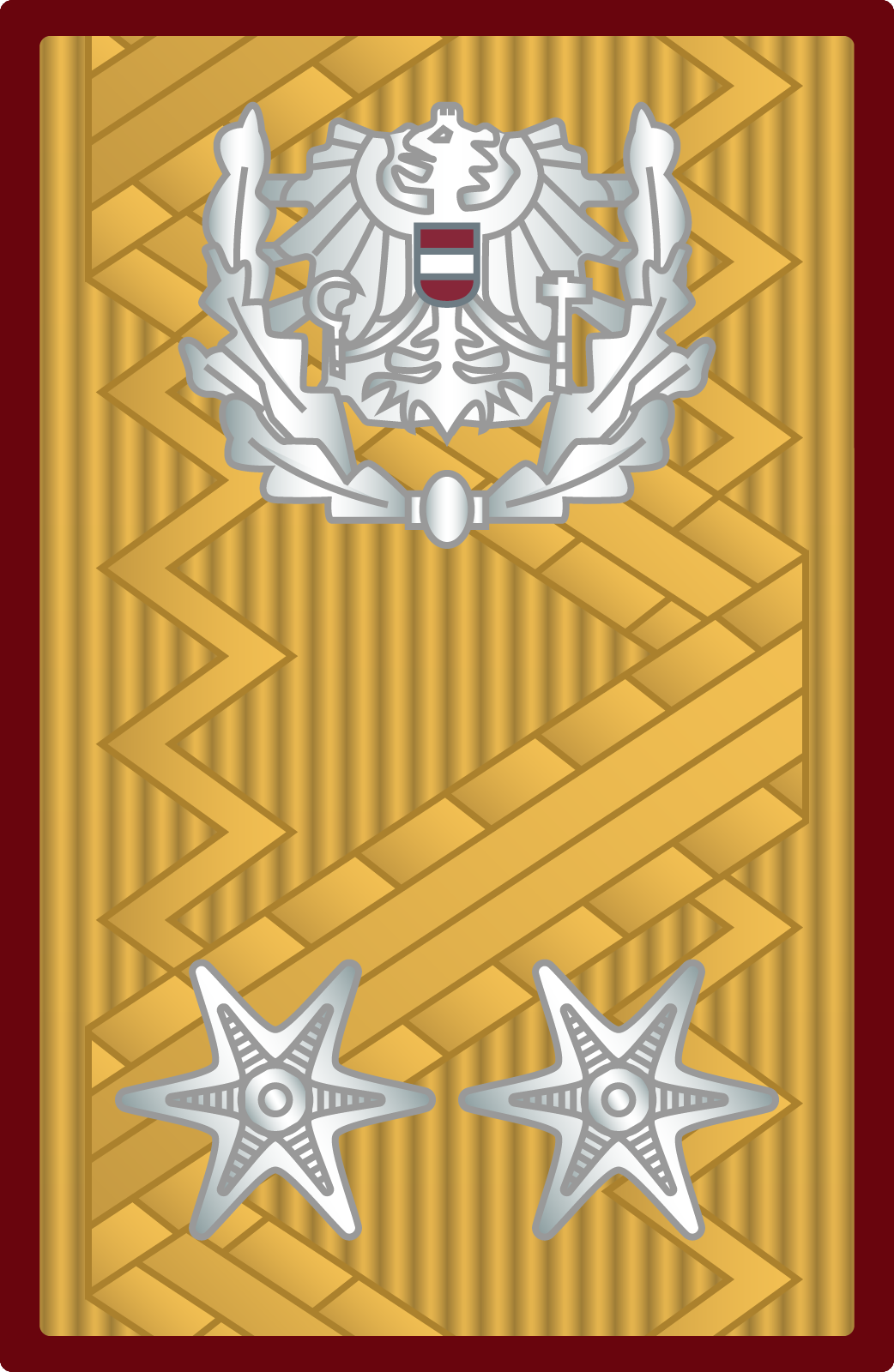
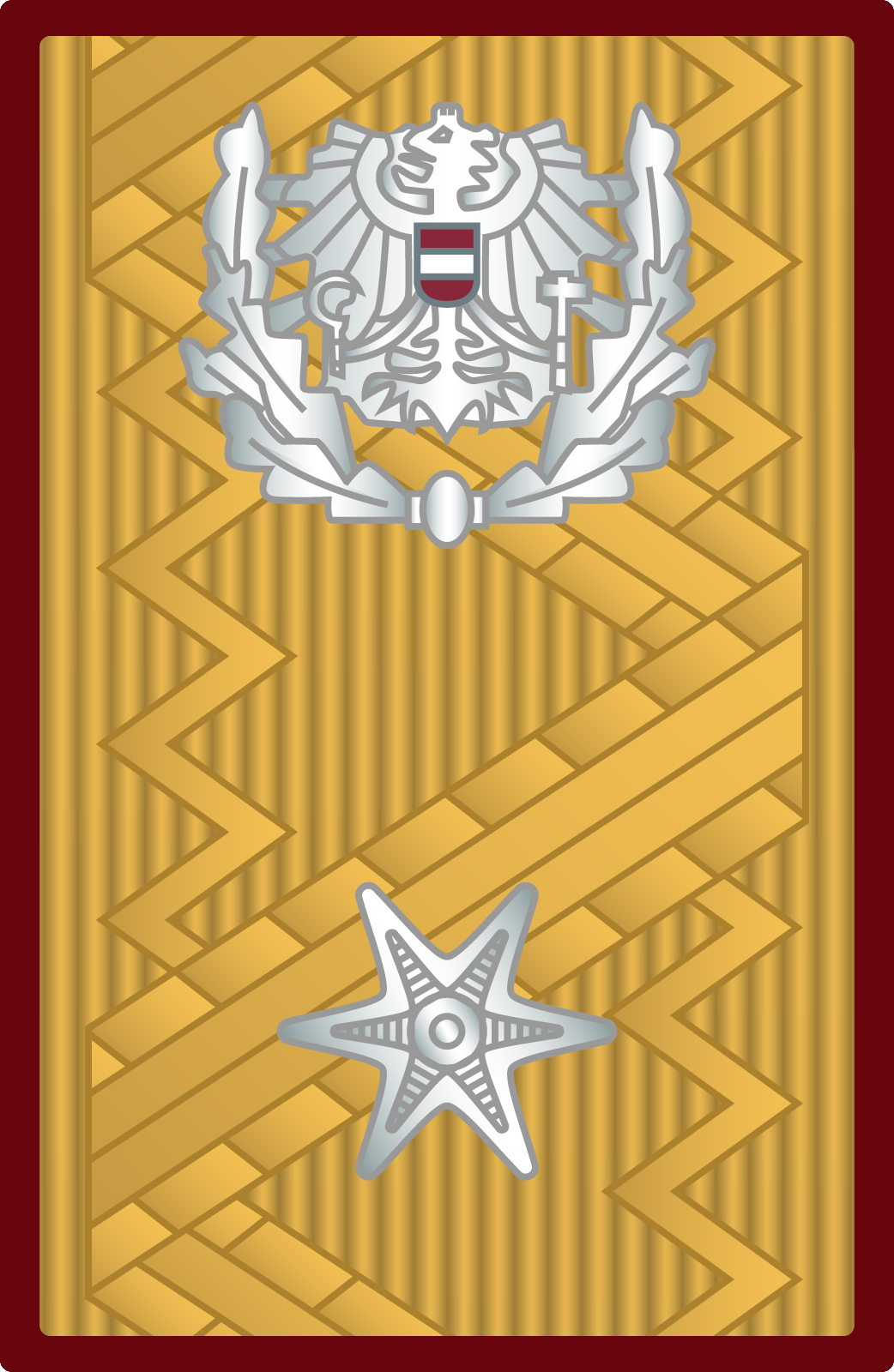
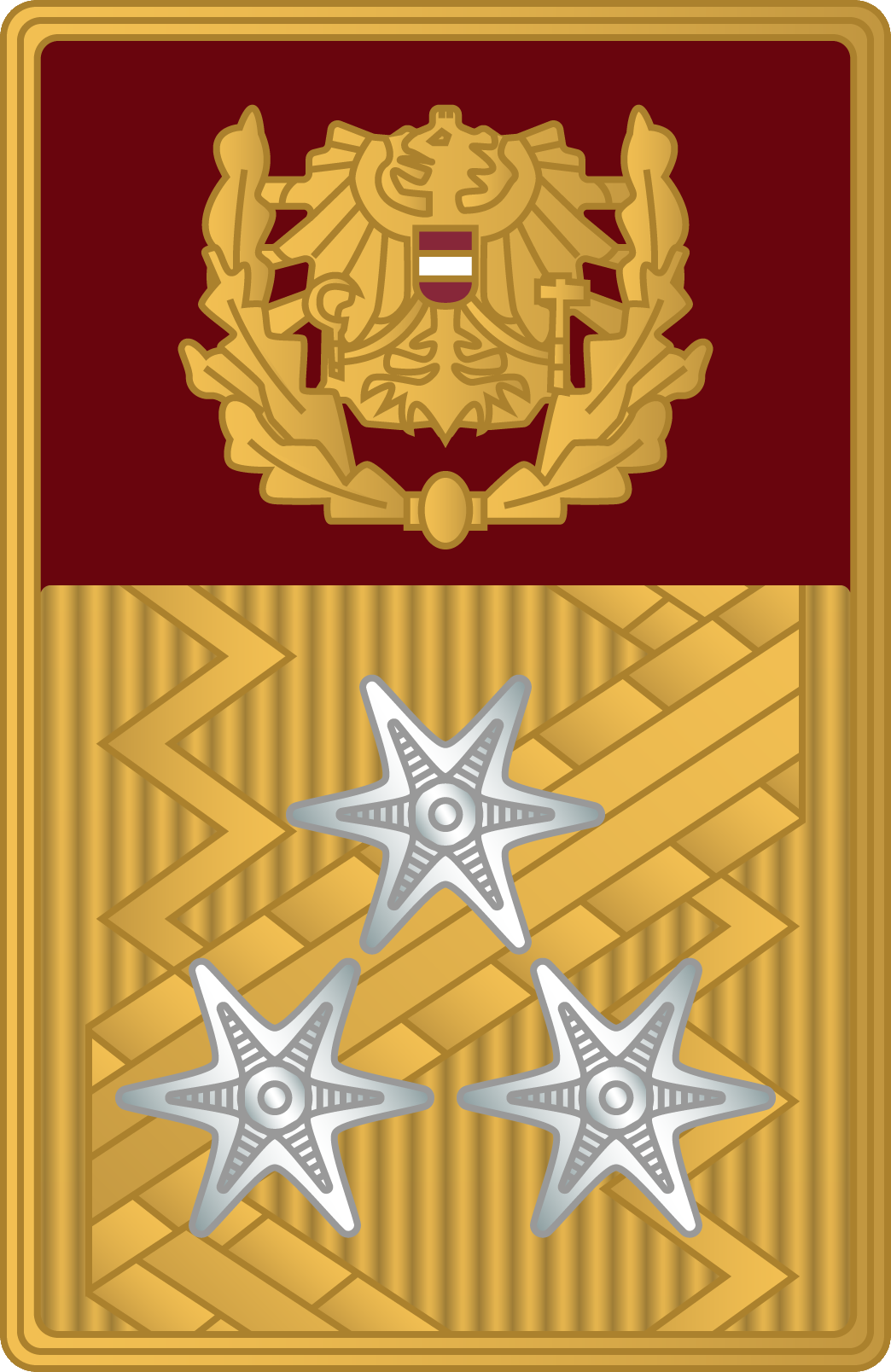
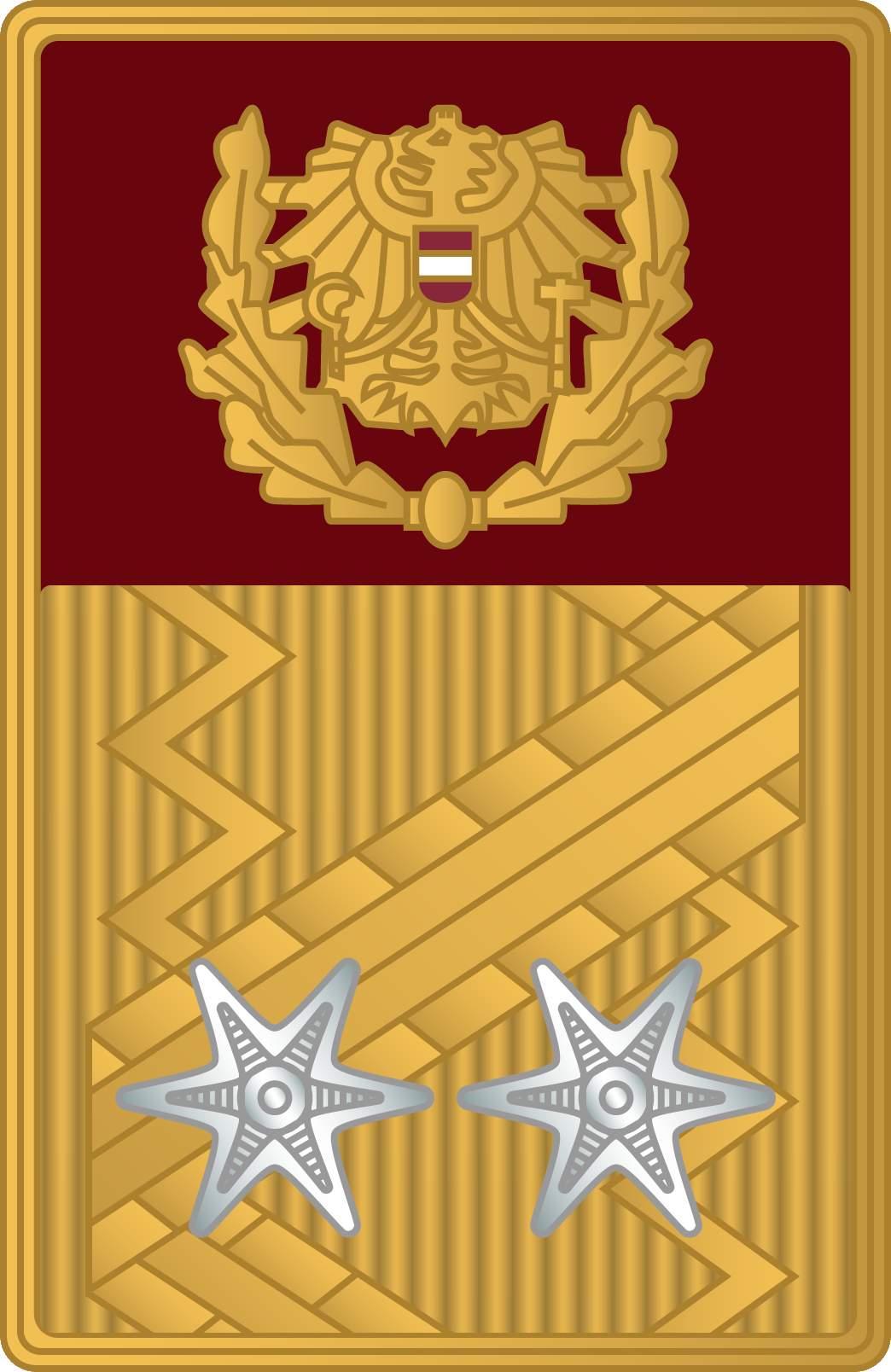
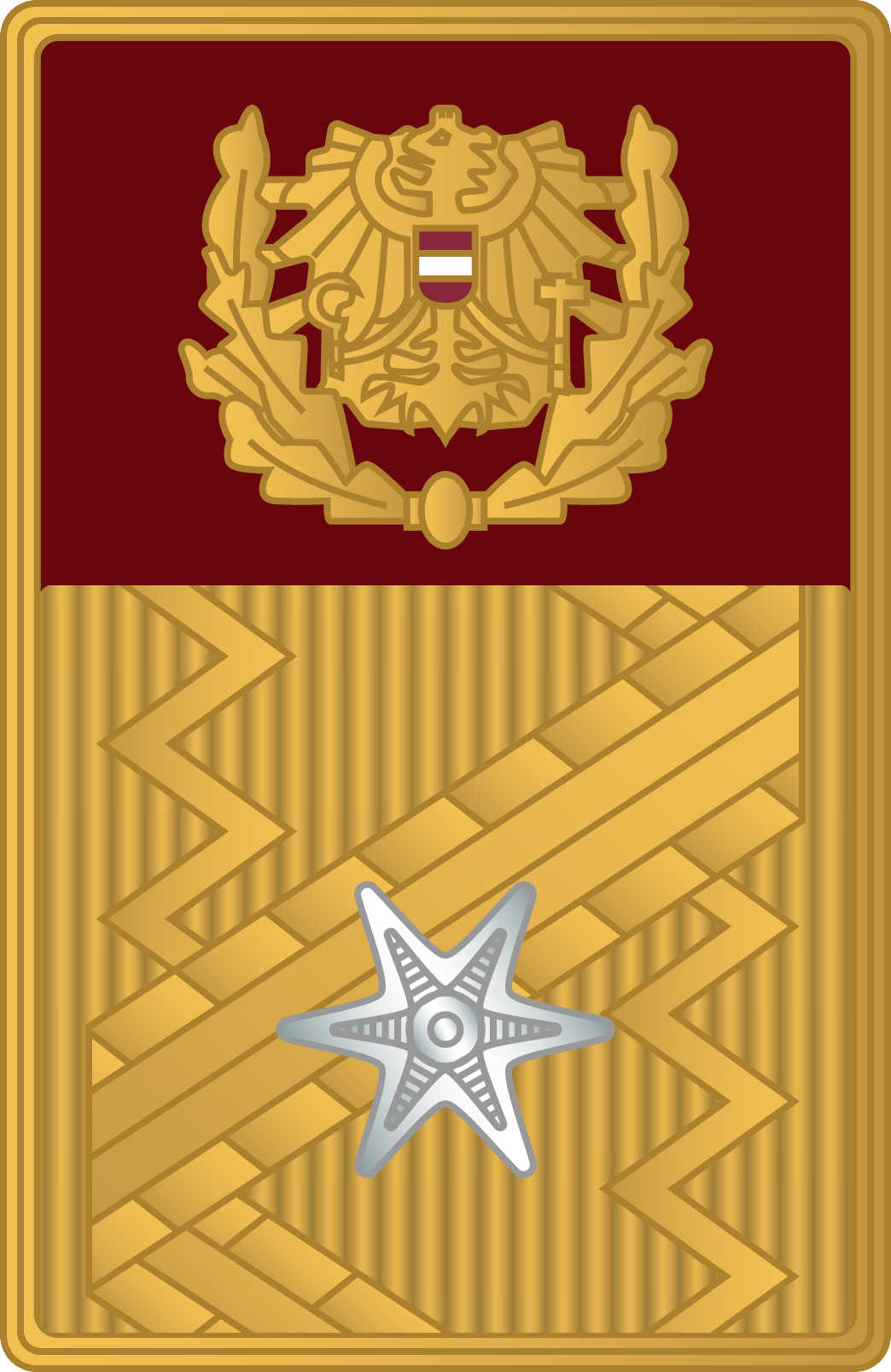
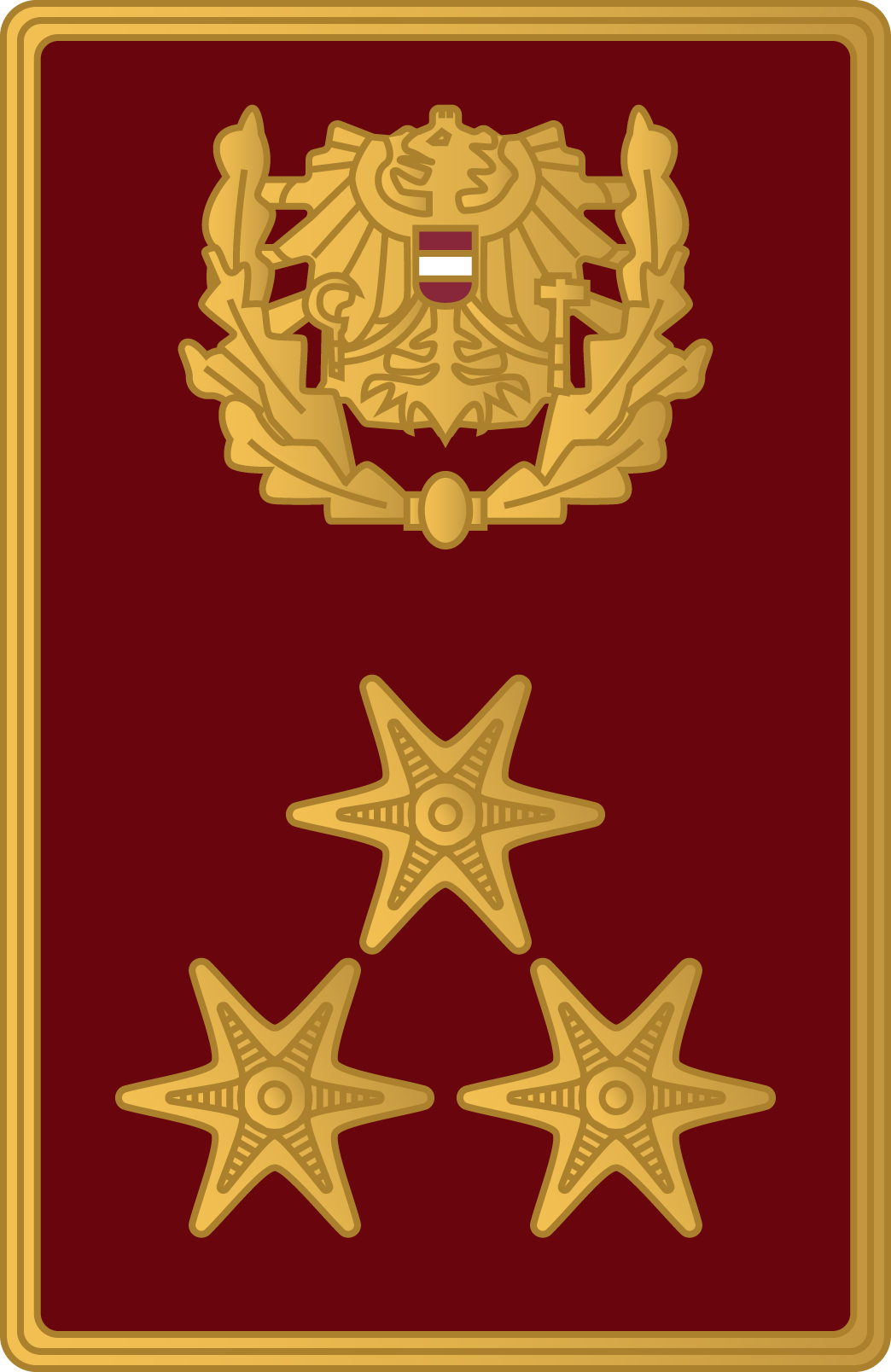
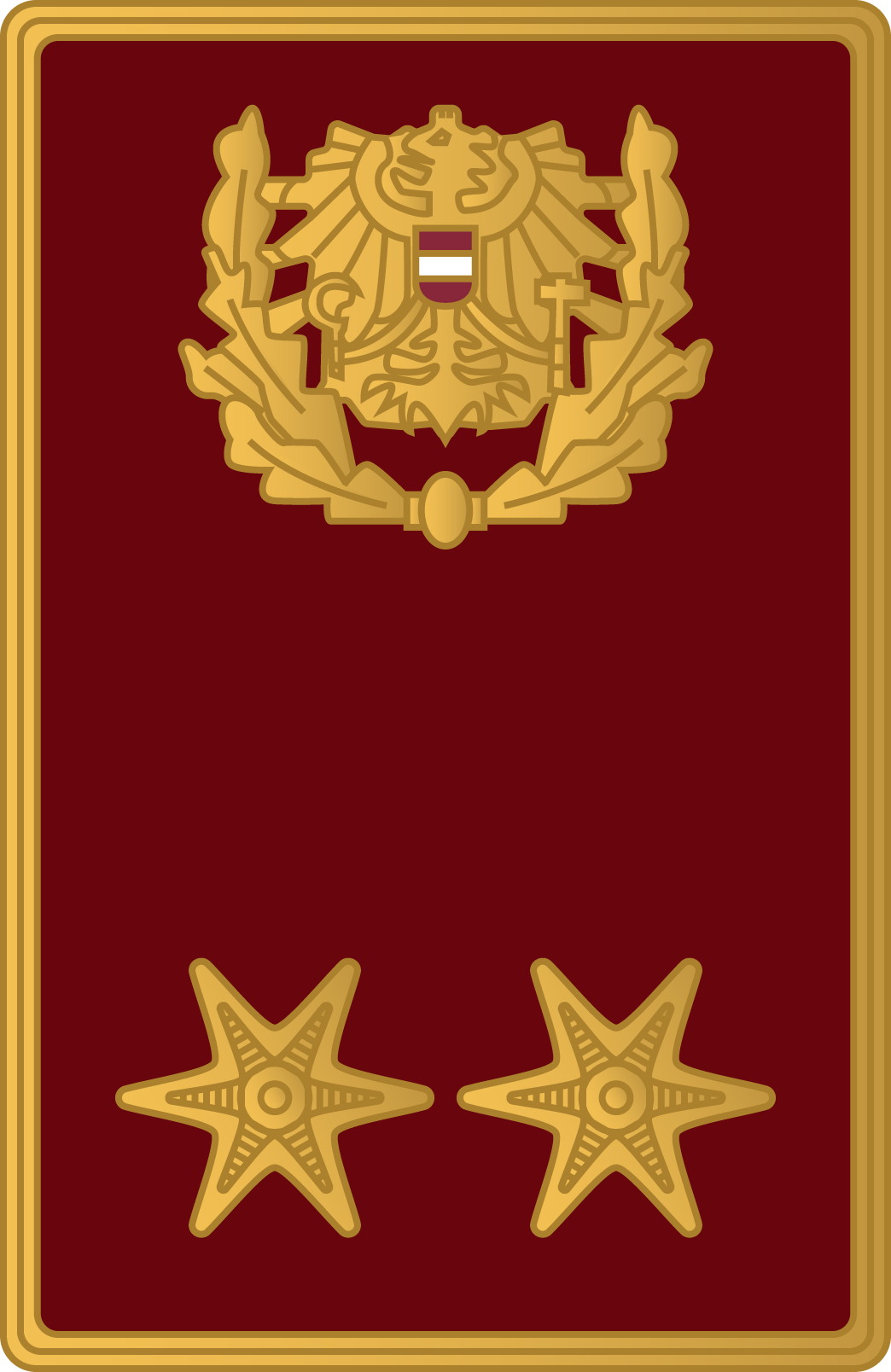
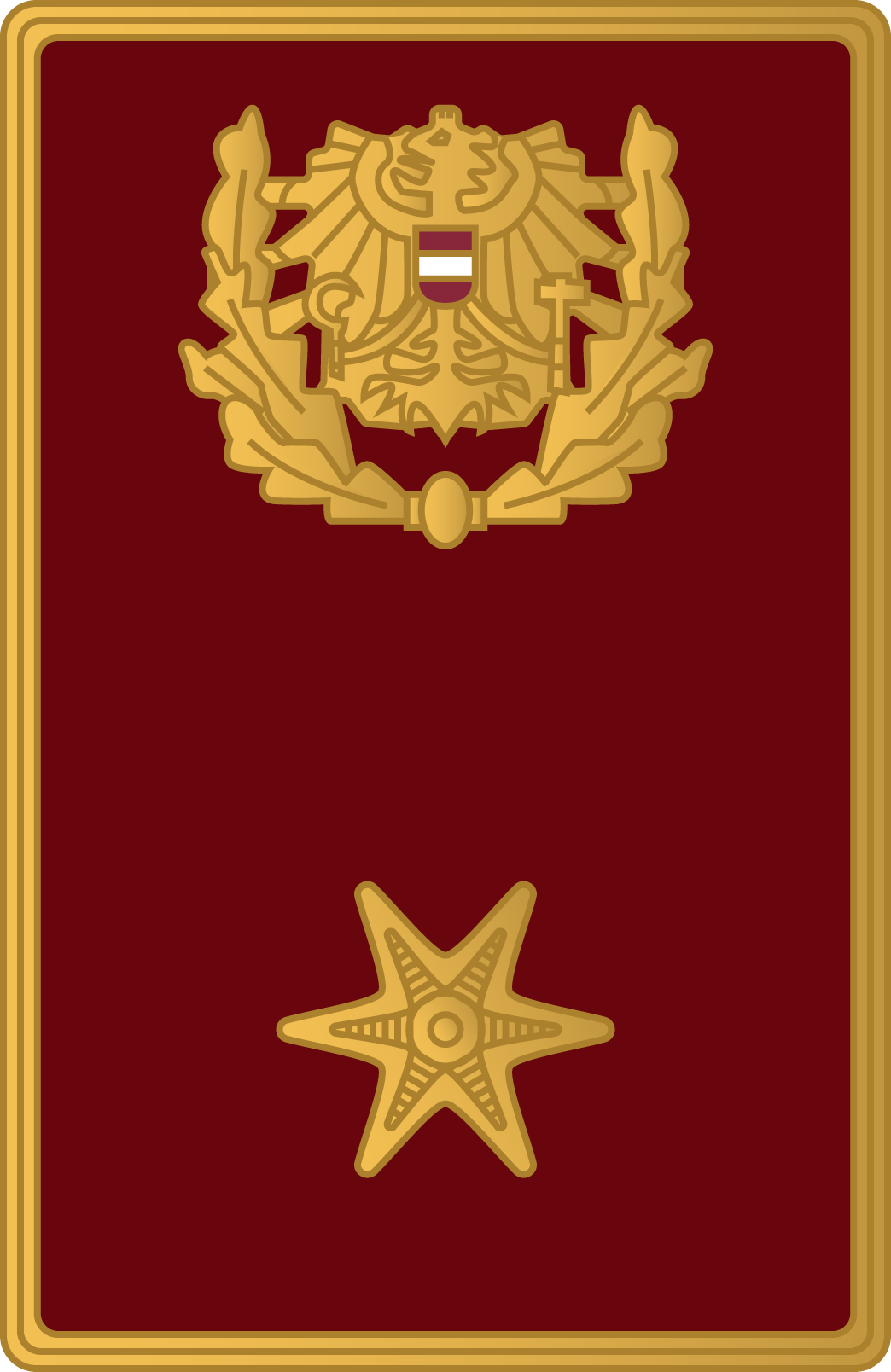
	General officers			Senior officers			Junior officers
(Austria) Austrian Federal Police
(Austria) Austrian Federal Police	General; Inspector general	Generalmajor; Deputy inspector general	Brigadier; Assistant inspector general	Oberst; Chief superintendent	Oberstleutnant; Superintendent	Major; Deputy superintendent	Hauptmann; Assistant superintendent	Oberleutnant; Divisional superintendent	Leutnant; Divisional assistant superintendent

Supervising officers and police officers

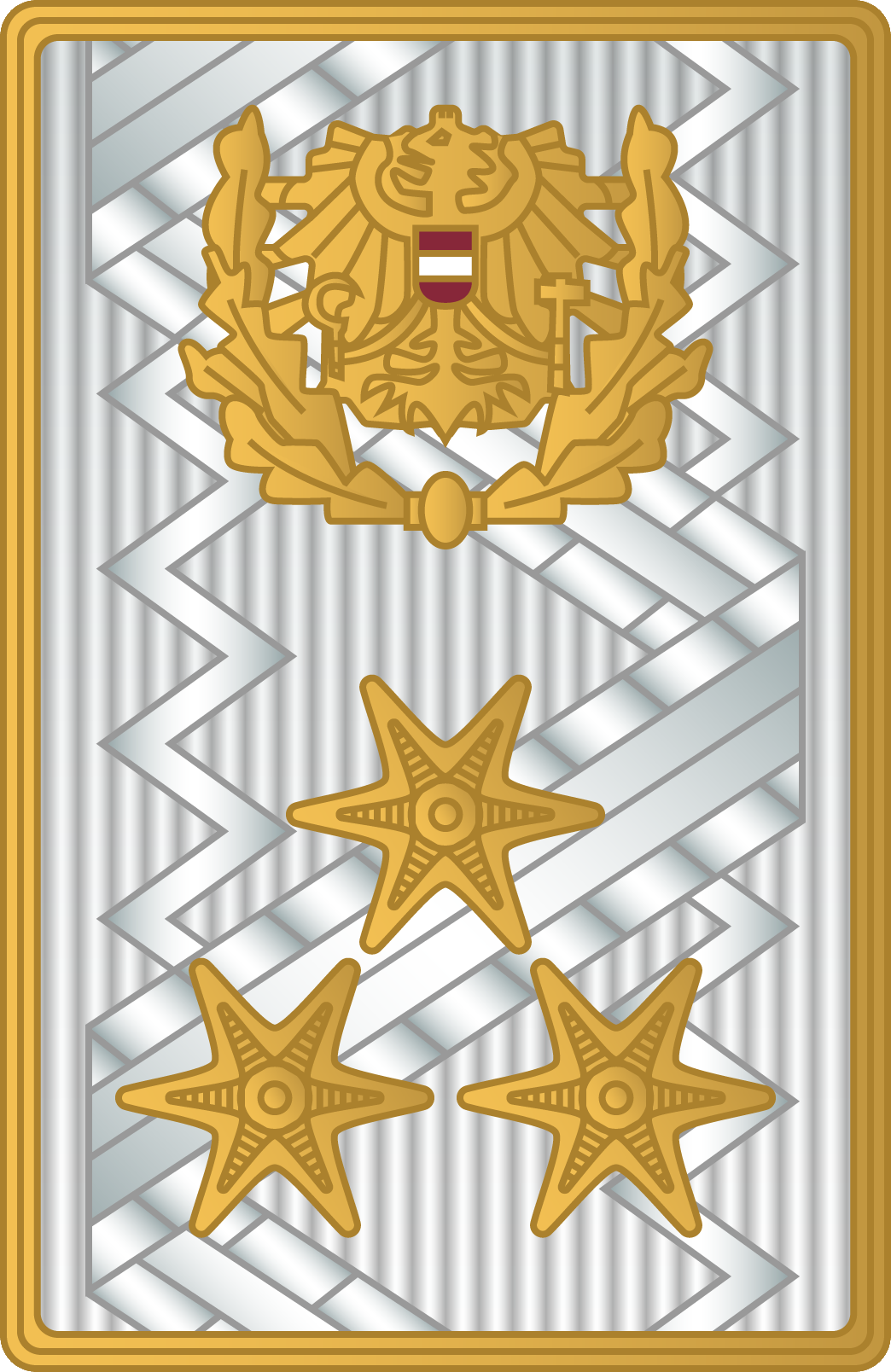
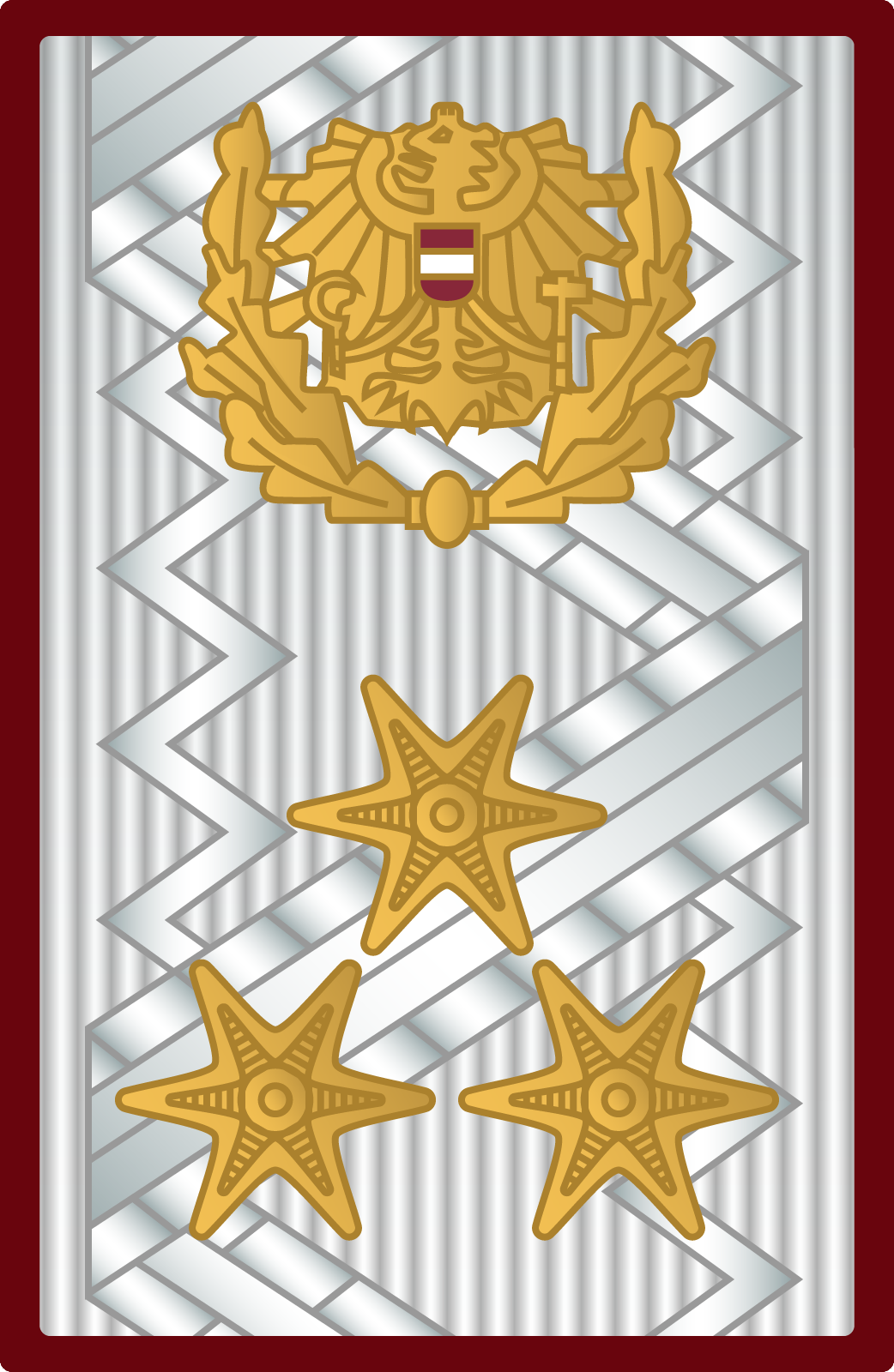
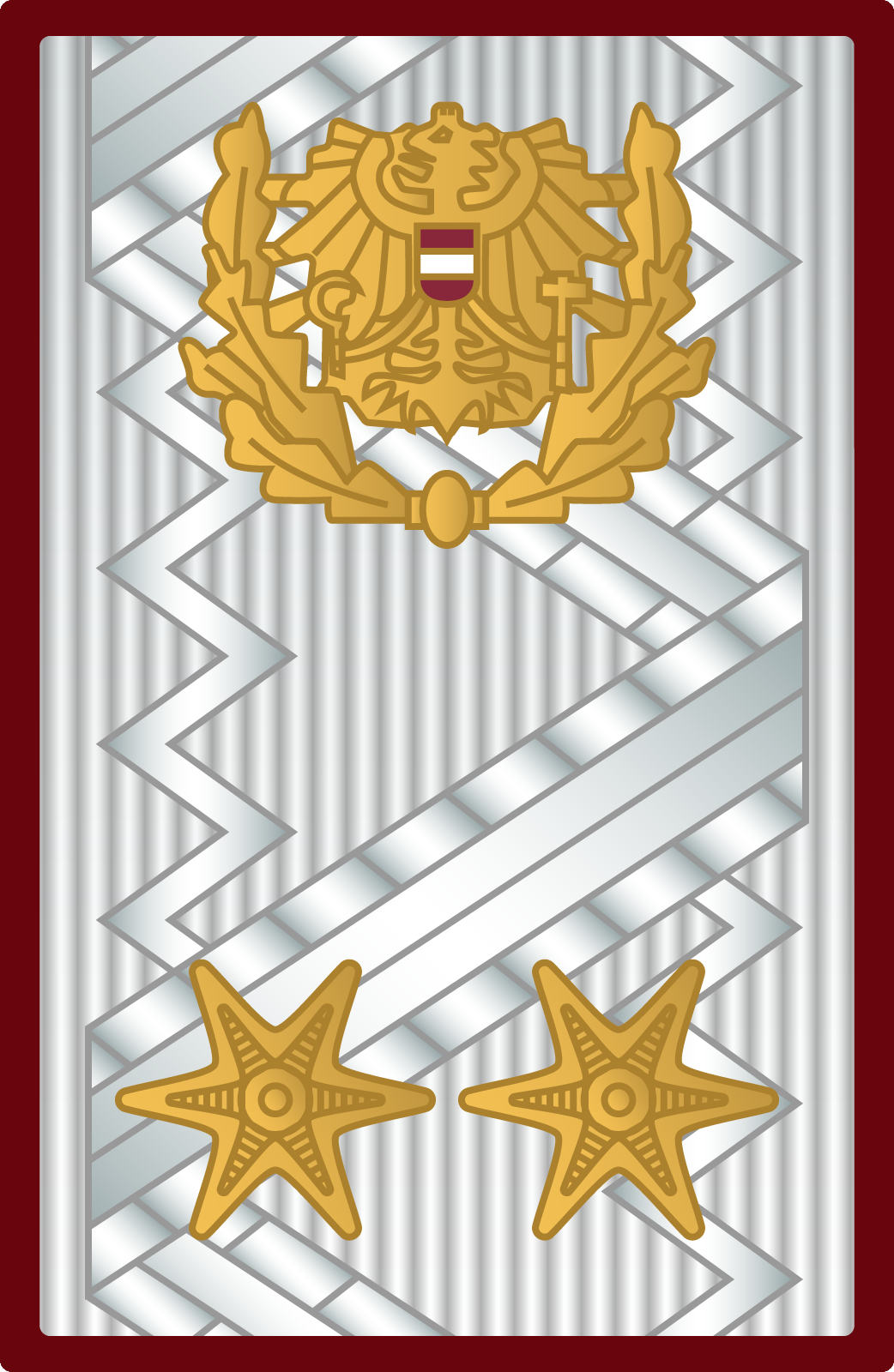
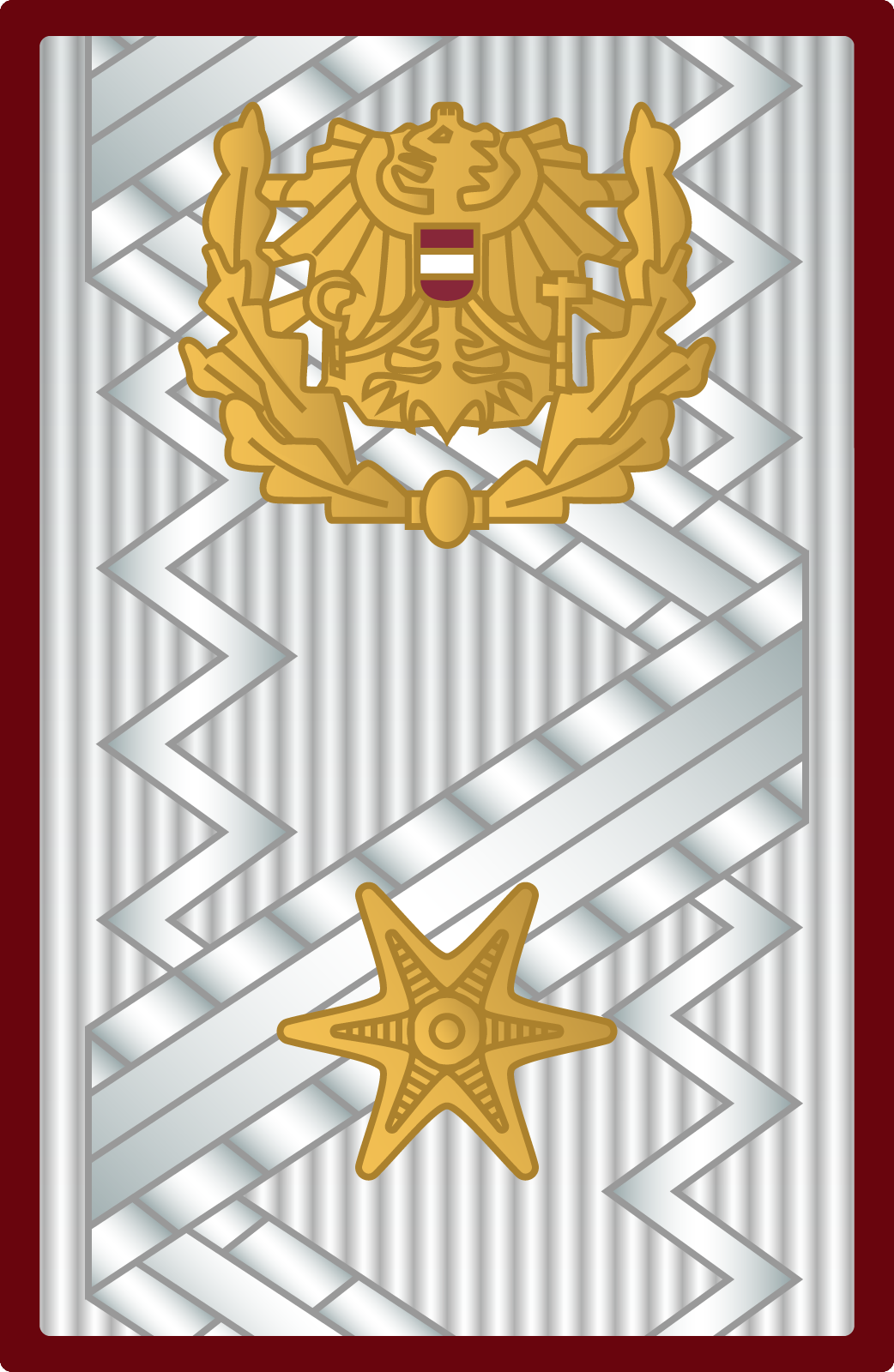
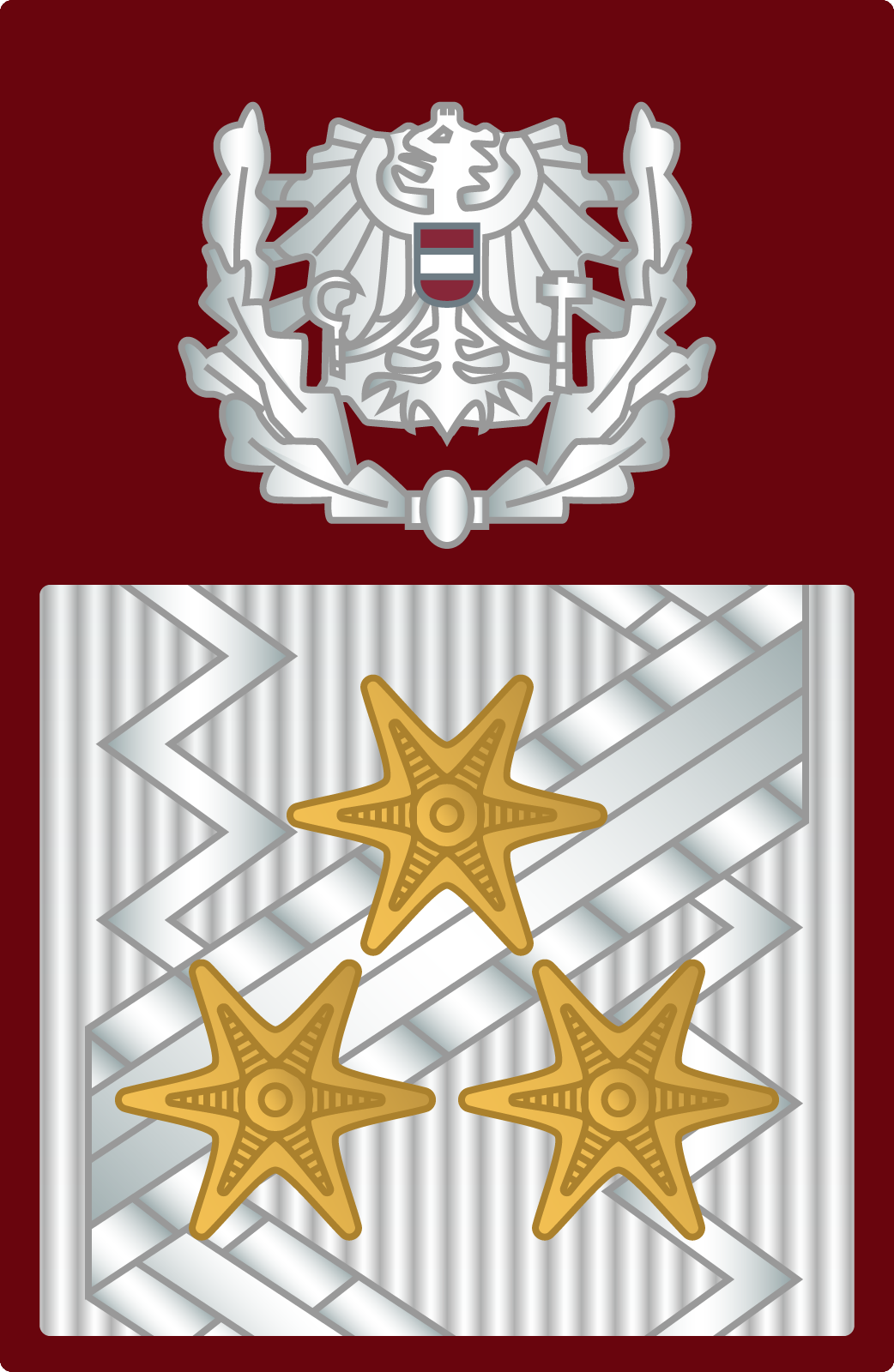
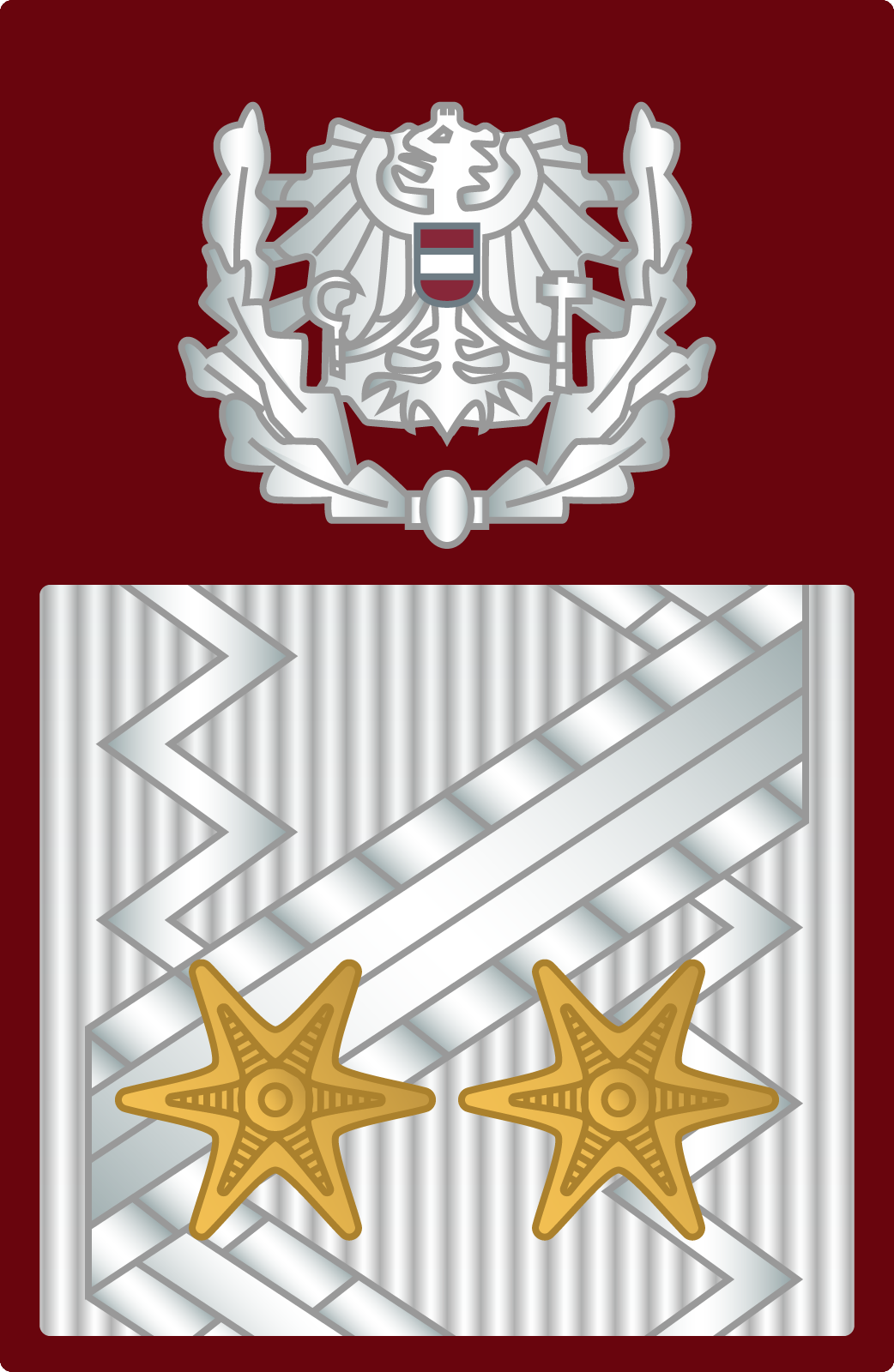
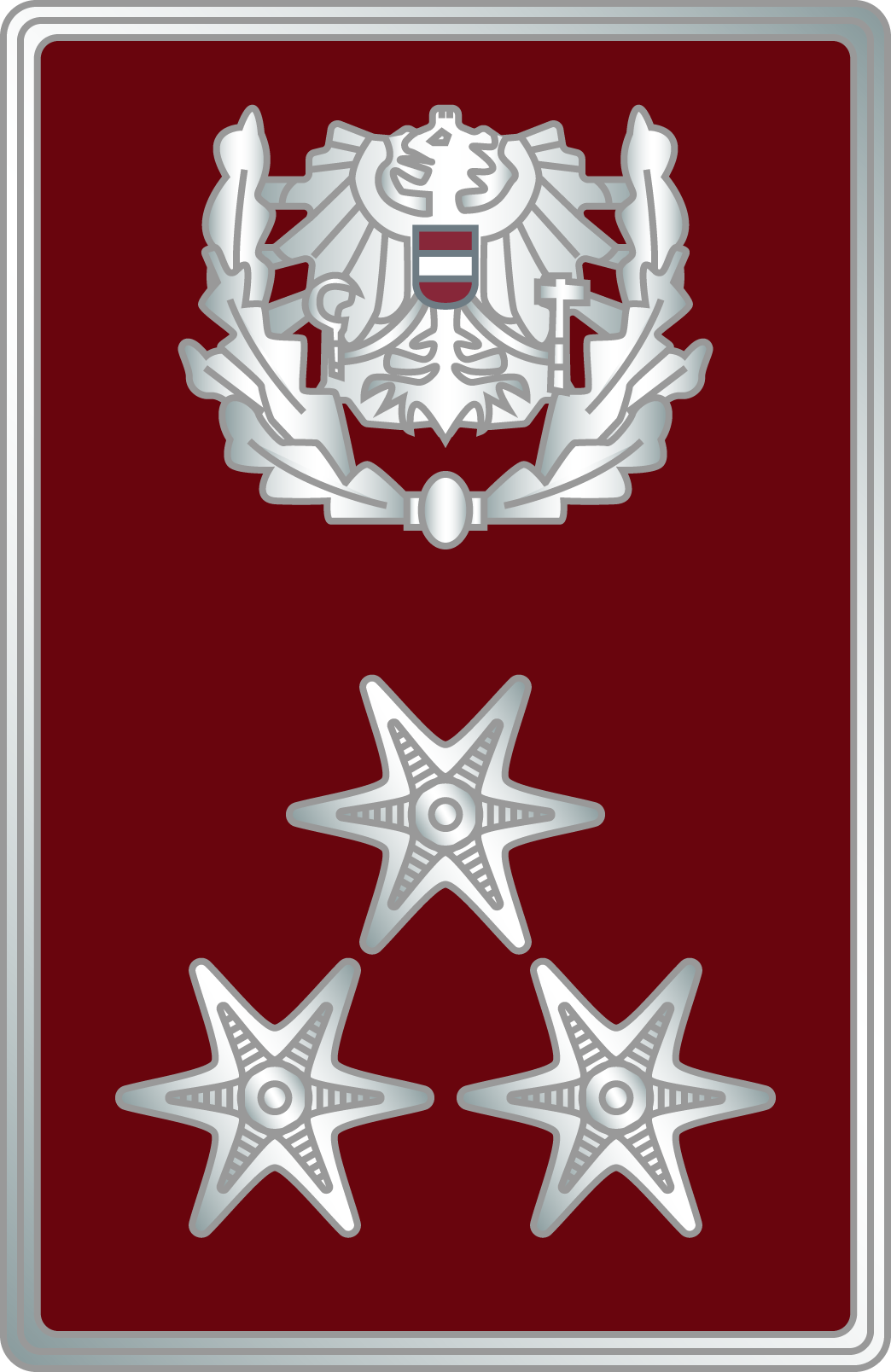
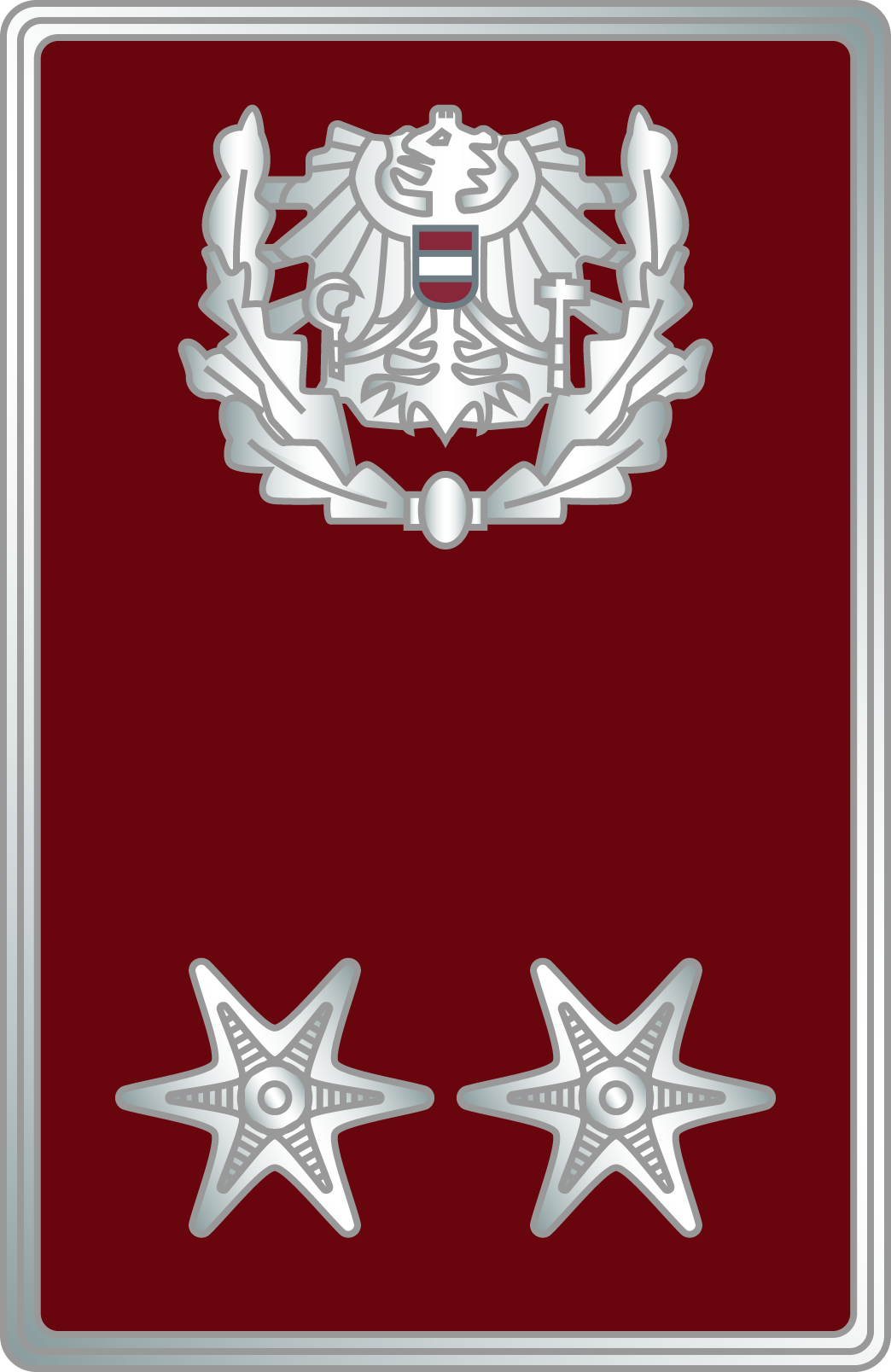
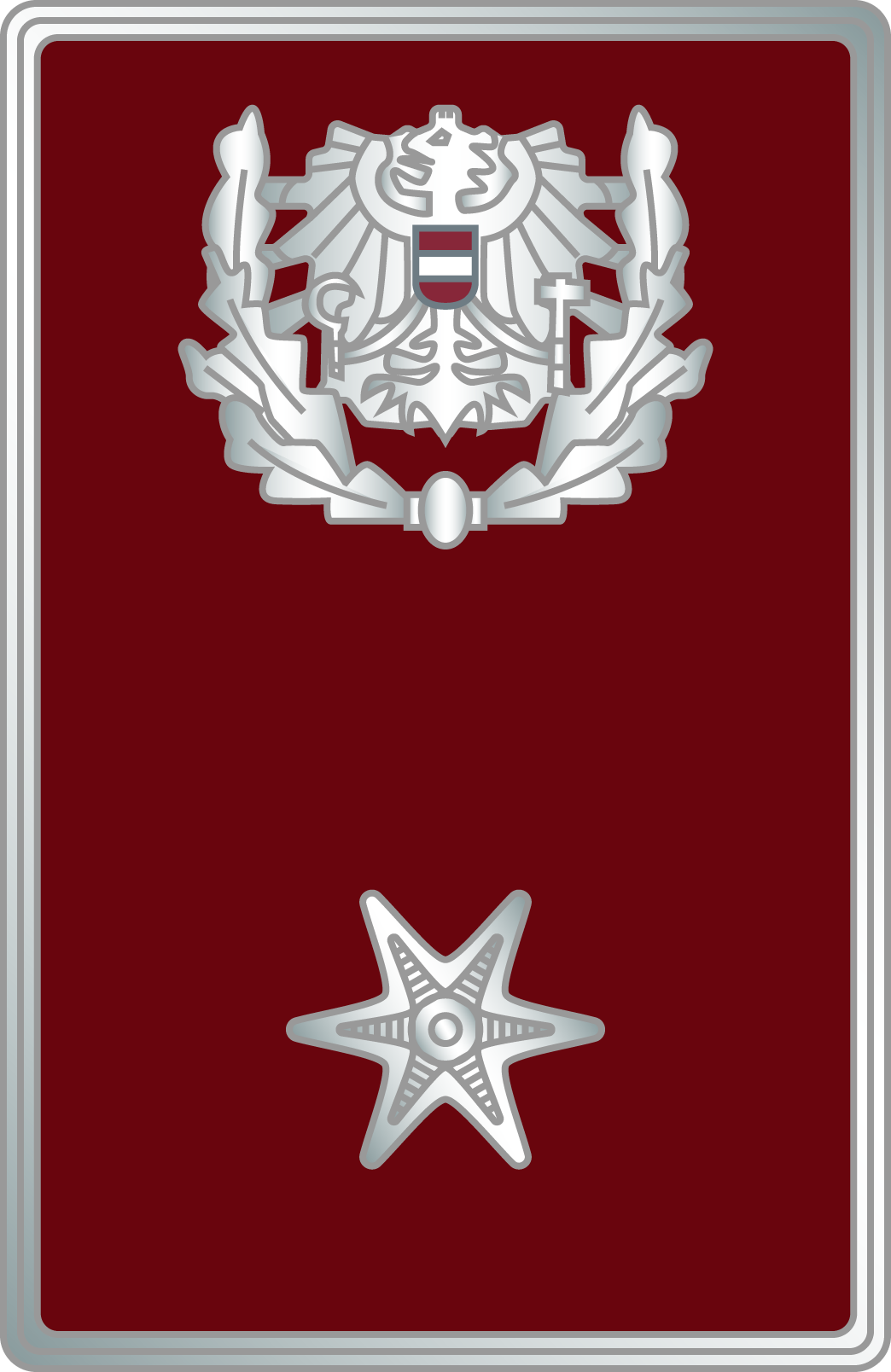
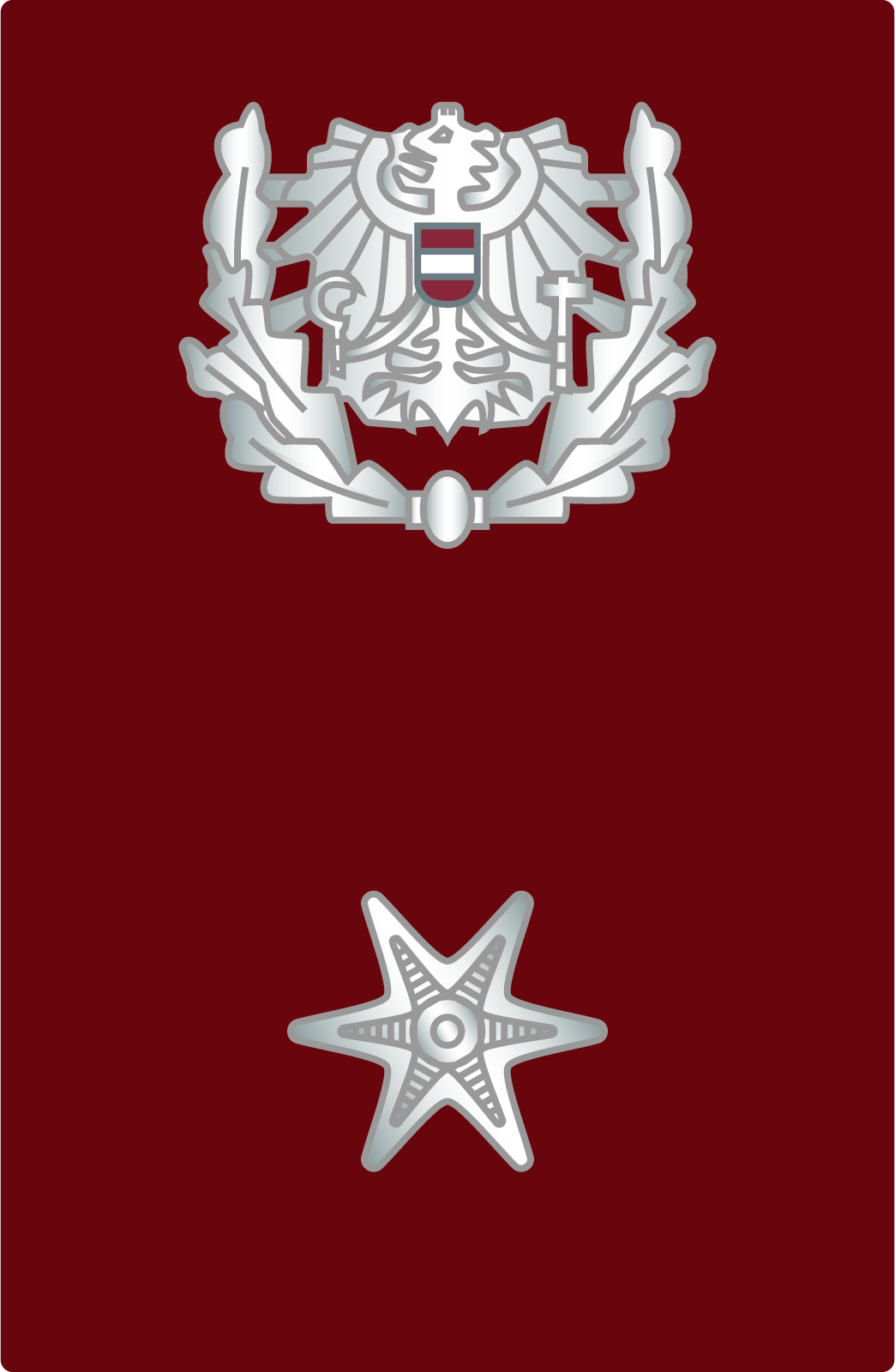
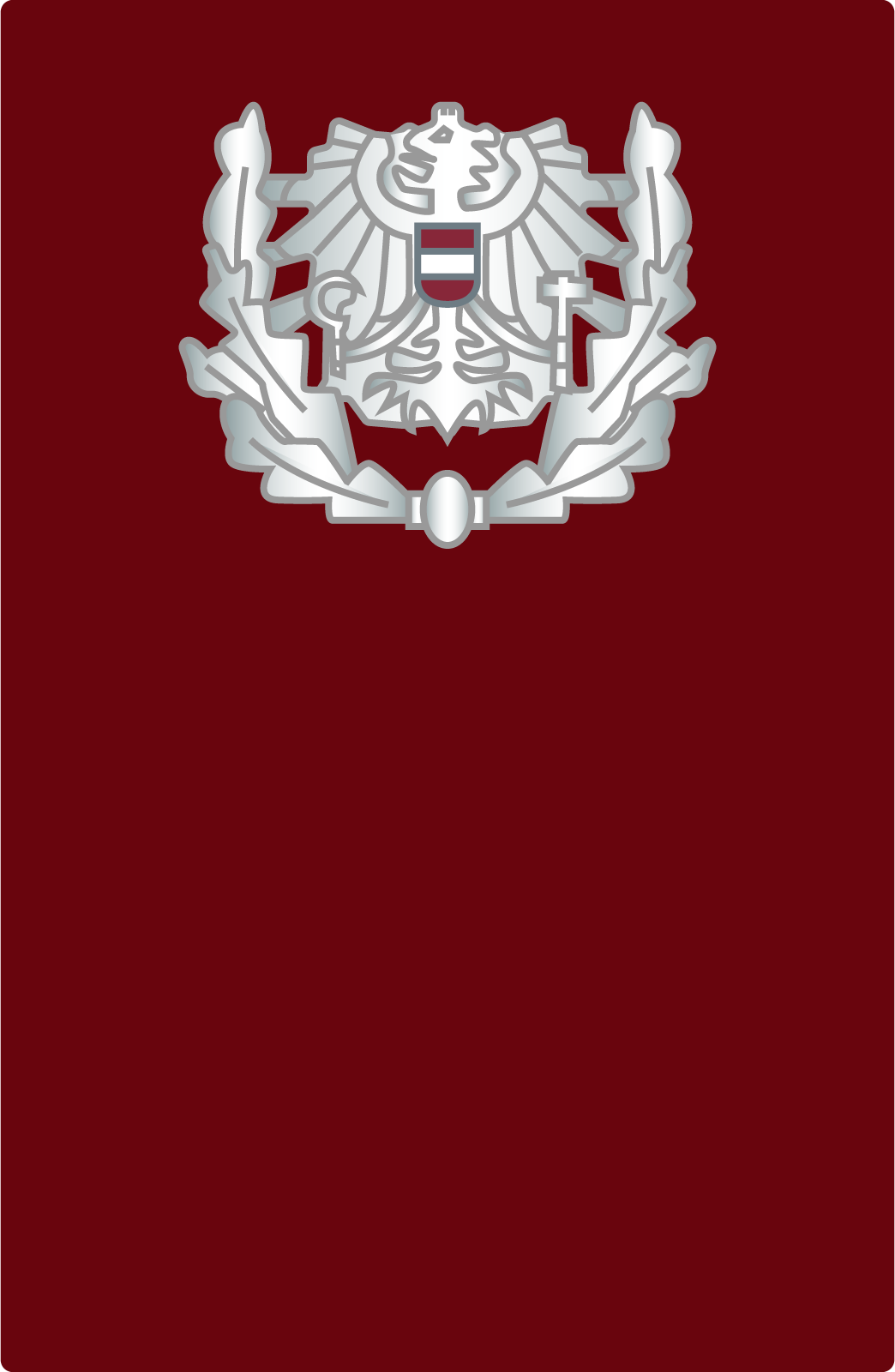
	Supervising officers						Police officers
(Austria) Austrian Federal Police
(Austria) Austrian Federal Police	Chefinspektor (Fgrp 7); Senior chief inspector	Chefinspektor (Fgrp 6); Chief inspector	Kontrollinspektor; Divisional inspector	Abteilungs- inspektor Sub-divisional inspector	Bezirksinspektor'; Station sergeant	Gruppeninspektor; Sergeant	Gruppeninspektor; Sergeant; Not in line of promotion	Revierinspektor; Senior constable	Inspektor; Constable	Inspektor GFP; Border guard constable	Aspirant; Probationary constable

== Belarus ==
=== Officers ===
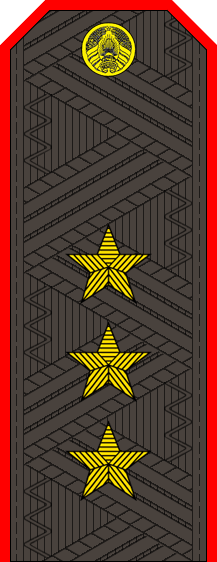
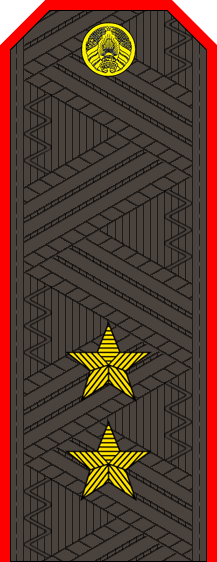
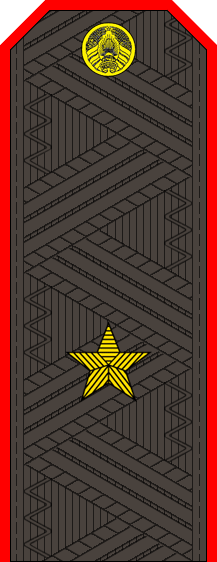
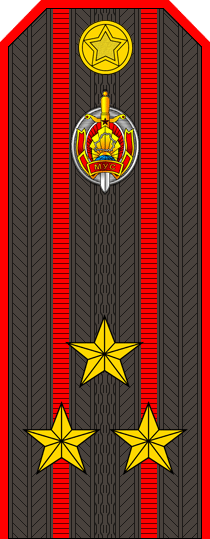
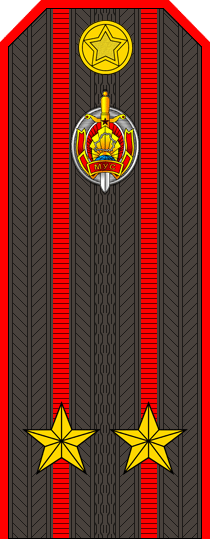
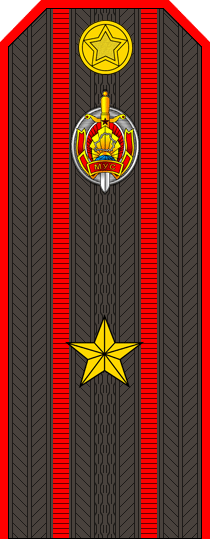
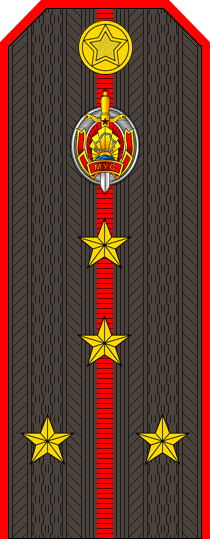
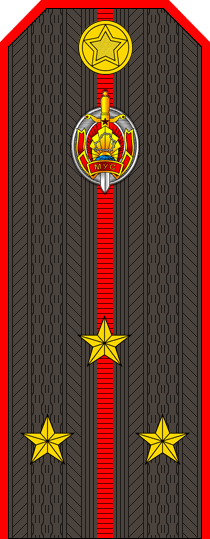
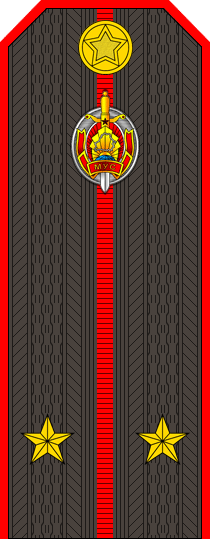
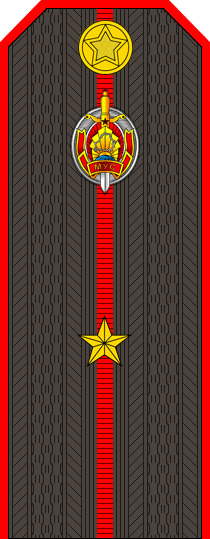
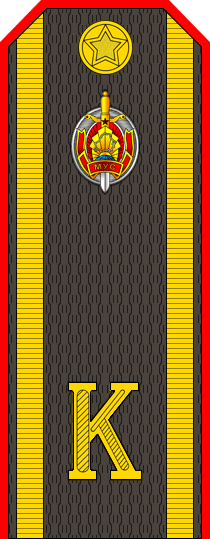
Rank group	General / flag officers			Senior officers			Junior officers
Militsiya of the Republic of Belarus
Militsiya of the Republic of Belarus	Colonel general	Lieutenant general	Major general	Colonel	Lieutenant colonel	Major	Captain	Senior lieutenant	Lieutenant	Junior lieutenant	Kursant

=== Other ===
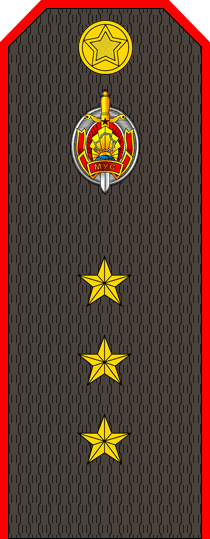
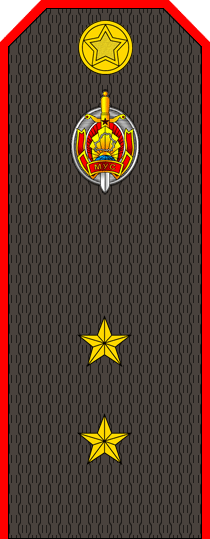
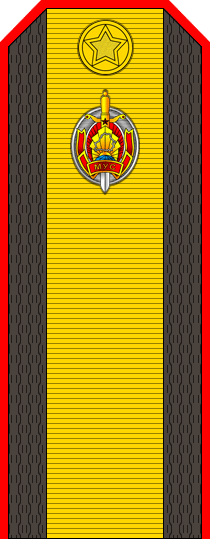
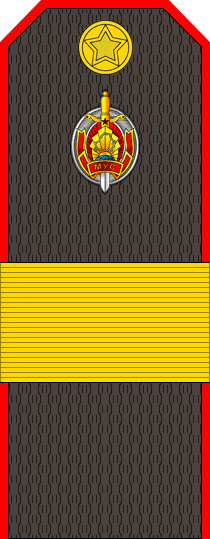
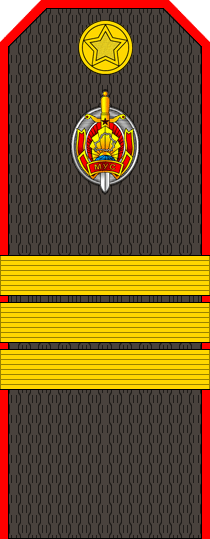
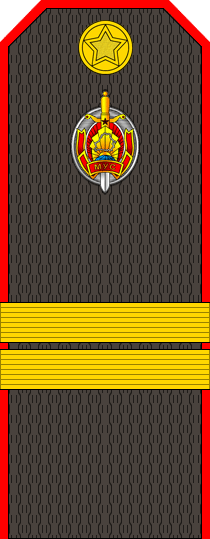
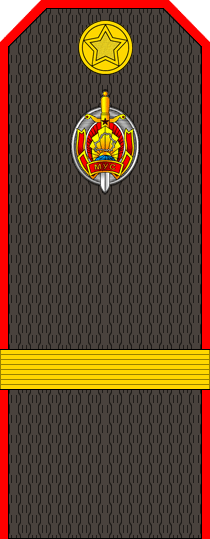
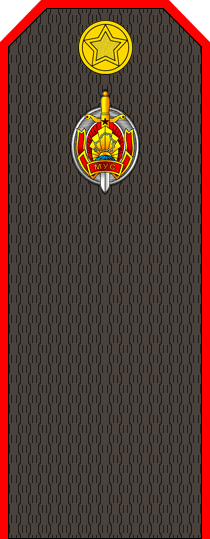
Rank group	Senior NCOs					Junior NCOs	Enlisted
Militsiya of the Republic of Belarus
Militsiya of the Republic of Belarus	Ста́рший пра́порщик Senior warrant officer	Пра́порщик; Warrant officer	Старшина́ Starshina	Ста́рший сержа́нт Senior sergeant	Сержа́нт; Sergeant	Младший cержа́нт Junior sergeant	Ефре́йтор; Yefreytor	Рядово́й; Private

== Belgium ==
Group	Officer level					Middle-level			Base-level		
Federal Police	EHCP polfed	CDP polfed	ECP polfed	CP polfed	ACP polfed	EHINP polfed	INPP polfed	AINPP polfed	EINP polfed	INP polfed	AINP polfed
Local police	ECDP polloc	CDP polloc	ECP polloc	CP polloc	ACP polloc	EINPP polloc	INPP polloc	AINPP polloc	EINP polloc	INP polloc	AINP polloc
Title	First chief commissioner Eerste Hoofdcommissaris; Premier commissaire divisionnaire Erste chefkomissar	Chief commissioner Hoofdcommissaris; Commissaire divisionnaire Chefkomissar	First commissioner Eerste commissaris Premier commissaire Erste komissar	Commissioner; Commissaris; Commissaire; Komissar	Candidate commissioner Aspirant-commissaris; Aspirant-commissaire; Aufstrebender komissar	First chief inspector Eerste hoofdinspecteur Premier inspecteur principal Erste chefinspektor	Chief inspector Hoofdinspecteur; Inspecteur principal Chefinspektor	Candidate chief inspector Aspirant-hoofdinspecteur; Aspirant-inspecteur principal Aufstrebender chefinspektor	First inspector Eerste inspecteur Premier inspecteur Erste inspektor	Inspector; Inspecteur; Inspecteur; Inspektor	Candidate inspector Aspirant-inspecteur; Aspirant-inspecteur; Aufstrebender inspektor
Group	Security-level								Auxiliary-level		
Federal Police	1BCSP polfed	BCSP polfed	1BASP polfed	BASP polfed	ABASP polfed	1BAGP polfed	BAGP polfed	ABAGP polfed	EAP polfed	AP polfed	AAP polfed
Local police	N/A								EAP polloc	AP polloc	AAP polloc
Title	First security coordinator Eerste beveiligingscoördinator Premier coordinateur de sécurisation de police Erster Sicherungskoordinator der Polizei	Security coordinator Beveiligingscoördinator; Coordinateur de sécurisation de police Sicherungskoordinator der Polizei	First security assistant Eerste beveiligingsassistent Premier assistant de sécurisation de police Erster Sicherungsassistent der Polizei	Security assistant Beveiligingsassistent; Assistant de sécurisation de police Sicherungsassistent der Polizei	Candidate security assistant Aspirant-beveiligingsassistent; Aspirant assistant de sécurisation de police Sicherungsassistent-Anwärter der Polizei	First security officer Eerste beveiligingsagent Premier agent de sécurisation de police Erster Sicherungsbediensteter der Polizei	Security officer Beveiligingsagent; Agent de sécurisation de police Sicherungsbediensteter der Polizei	Candidate security officer Aspirant-beveiligingsagent; Aspirant agent de sécurisation de police Sicherungsbediensteter-Anwärter der Polizei	First (auxiliary) officer Eerste agent Premier agent Erste agent	(Auxiliary) officer Agent; Agent; Agent	Candidate (auxiliary) officer Aspirant-agent; Aspirant-agent; Aufstrebender agent

== Bosnia and Herzegovina ==
=== Republika Srpska ===
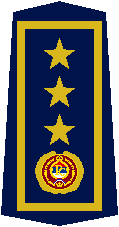
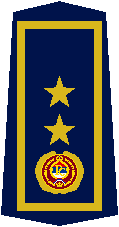
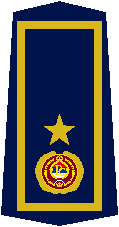
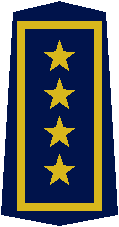
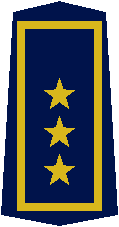
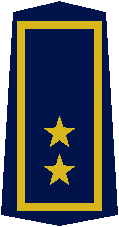
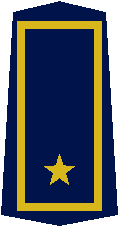
	Chief inspector			Inspector
Police of Republika Srpska
Police of Republika Srpska	Chief general inspector of police Главни генерални инспектор полиције	General inspector of police Генерални инспектор полиције	Chief inspector Главни инспектор	Independent inspector Самостални инспектор	Senior inspector Виши инспектор	Inspector; Инспектор	Junior inspector Млађи инспектор

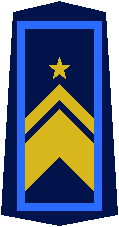
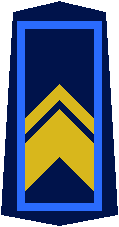
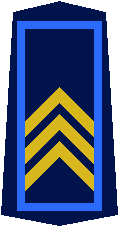
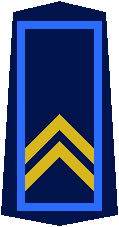
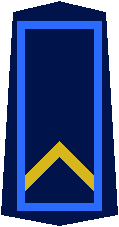
	Police officer
Police of Republika Srpska
Police of Republika Srpska	Chief police officer Главни полицајац	Independent police officer Самостални полицајац	Senior police officer Виши полицајац	Police officer Полицајац	Junior police officer Млађи полицајац

=== Bosnia and Herzegovina ===
Rank group	Chief of police (with the COA of the canton)			Inspector
Bosnian police
Bosnian police	Glavni Generalni Inspektor DGS-a	Generalni Inspektor DGS-a	Glavni Inspektor	Samostalni Inspektor	Visi Inspektor	Inspektor	Mladi Inspektor

Rank group	Police officer
Bosnian police
Bosnian police	Stariji Narednik	Narednik	Stariji Policajac	Policajac

== Bulgaria ==
Officers

Rank group	General / flag officers			Senior officers			Junior officers
(Bulgaria) National Police Service
(Bulgaria) National Police Service	Secretary general	Chief commissioner	Senior commissioner	Commissioner of police	Chief inspector	Senior inspector	Inspector; 1st grade	Inspector; 2nd grade	Inspector; 3rd grade
(Bulgaria) National Police Service	Главен секретар	Главен комисар	Старши комисар	Комисар	Главен инспектор	Старши инспектор	Инспектор I-ва степен	Инспектор II-ра степен	Инспектор III-та степен

Others

	Policemen
(Bulgaria) National Police Service
(Bulgaria) National Police Service	Chief policeman	Policeman; 1st grade	Policeman; 2nd grade	Policeman; 3rd grade
(Bulgaria) National Police Service	Главен полицай	Полицай I-ва степен	Полицай II степен	Полицай III степен

== Croatia ==
Regular police ranks

Insignia
Rank title	Police director general (Ravnatelj policije)	Deputy police director general (Zamjenik ravnatelja policije)	Police chaplain (Policijski kapelan)	Police superintendent general (Načelnik policijske uprave)	Assistant director general of police (Pomoćnik glavnog ravnatelja policije)	Police commander (Glavni ravnatelj policije)	Police senior commissioner (Glavni policijski savjetnik)	Police commissioner (Policijski savjetnik)	Chief police inspector (Glavni policijski inspektor)	Leading police inspector (Samostalni policijski inspektor)	Senior police inspector (Viši policijski inspektor)	Police inspector (Policijski inspektor)	Police sergeant major (Samostalni policijski narednik)	Police staff sergeant (Viši policijski narednik)	Police sergeant (Policijski narednik)	Leading police officer (Samostalni policajac)	Senior police officer (Viši policajac)	Police officer (Policajac)	Police college cadet (Vježbenik više i visoke stručne spreme)	Police basic recruit (Polaznik srednje stručne)	Police recruit with secondary school credentials (Vježbenik srednje stručne spreme)

== Cyprus ==
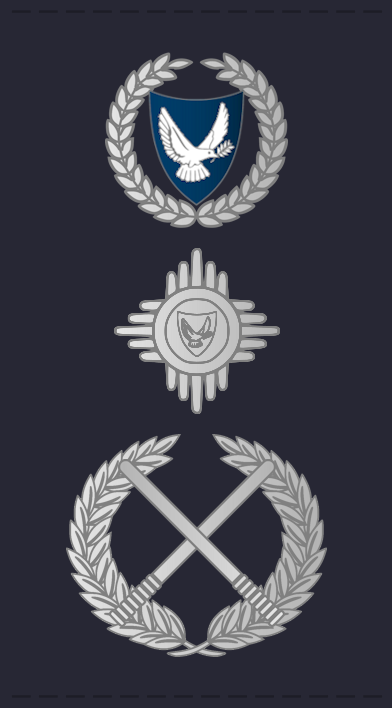
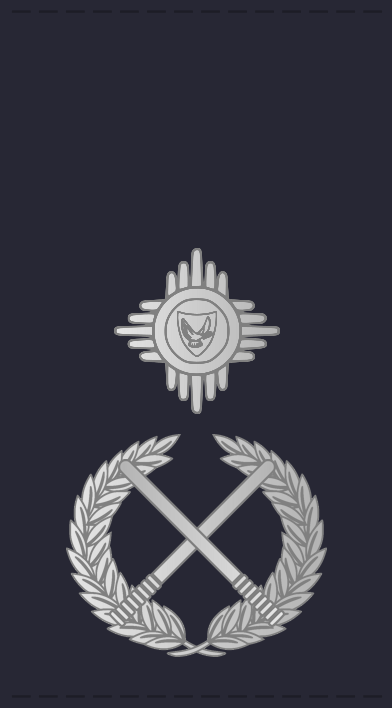
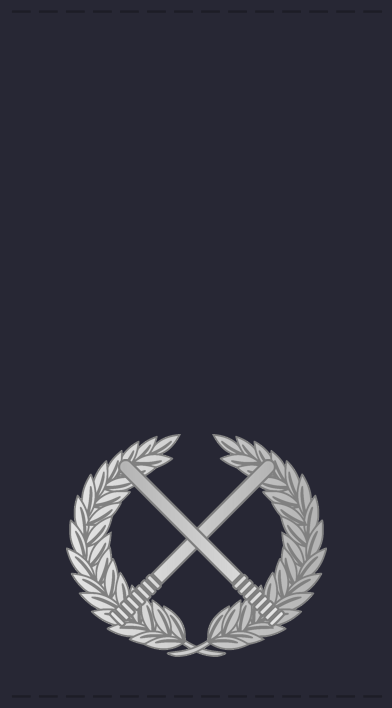
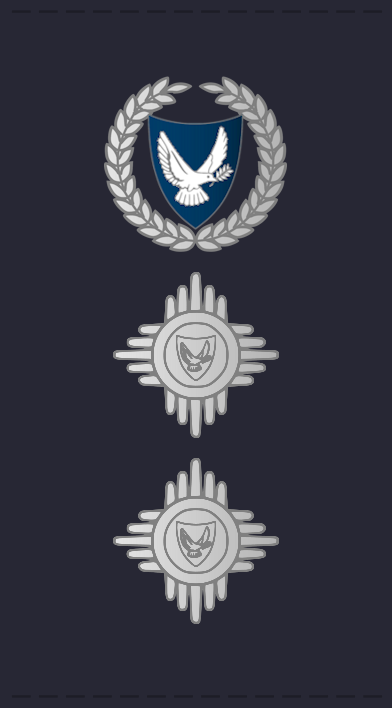
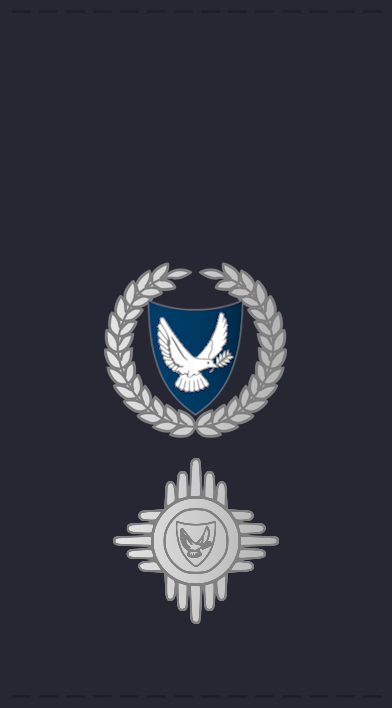
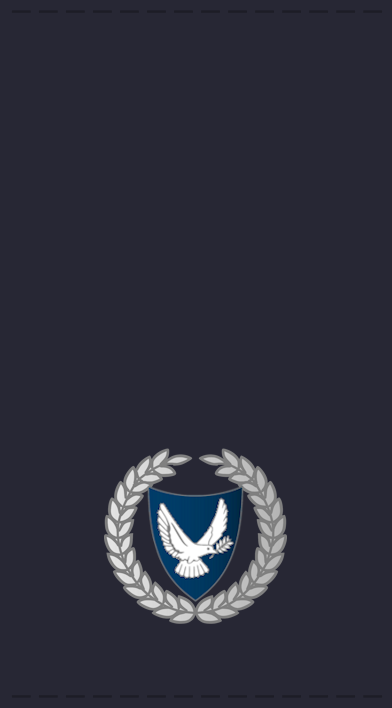
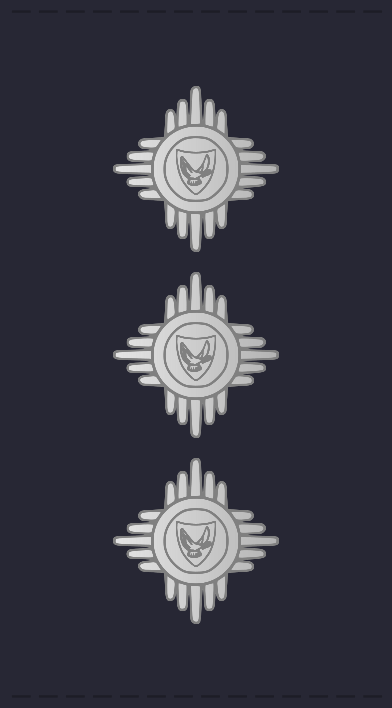
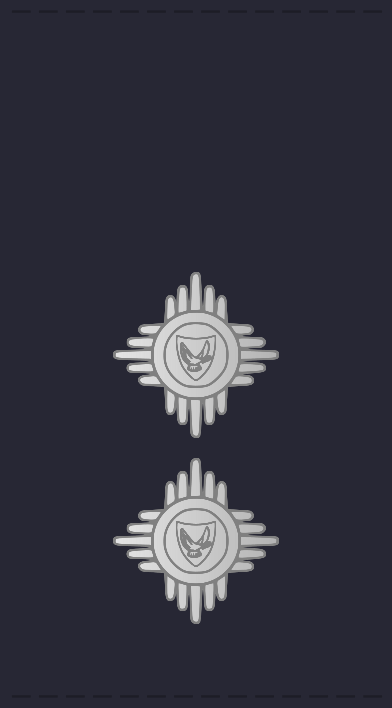
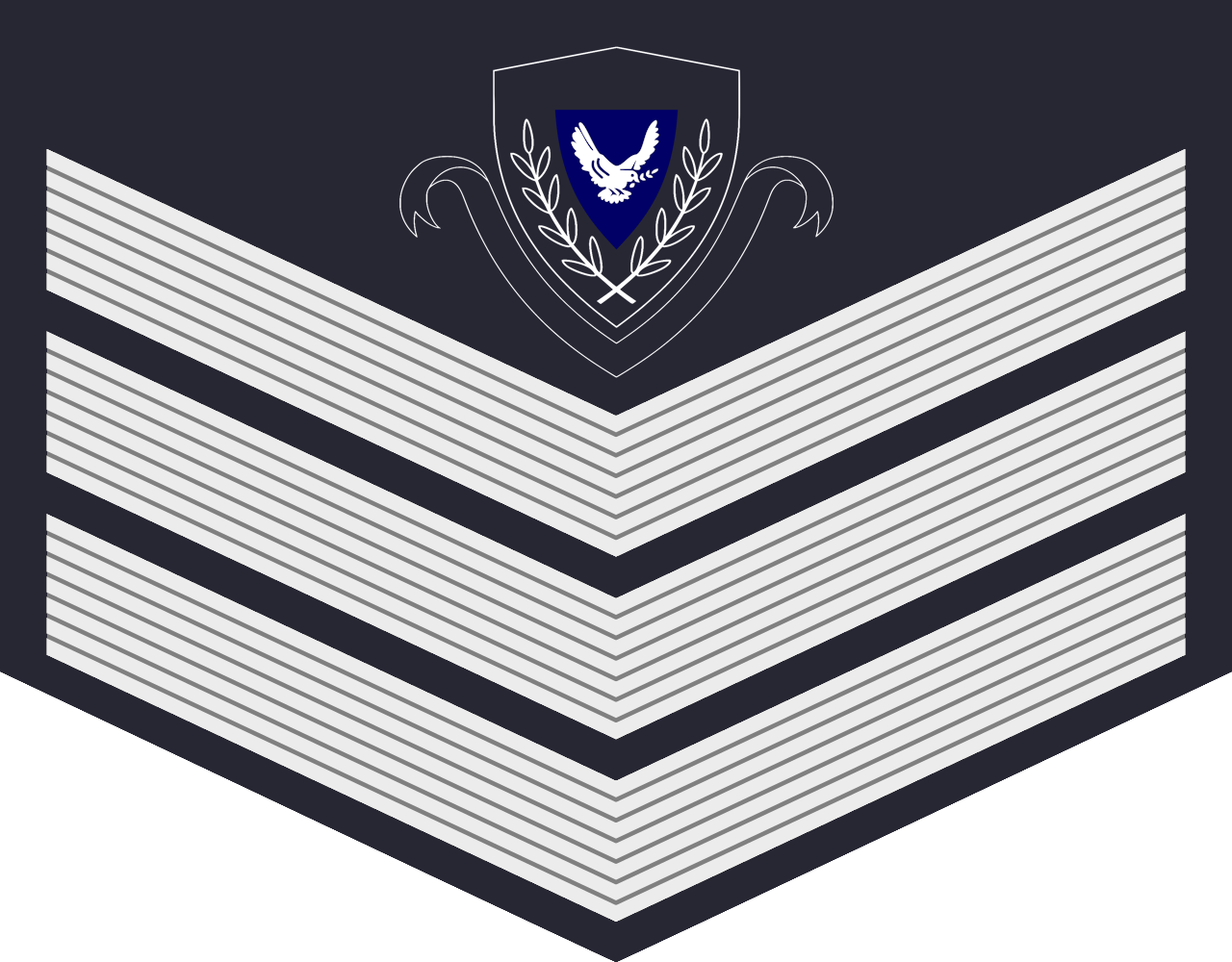
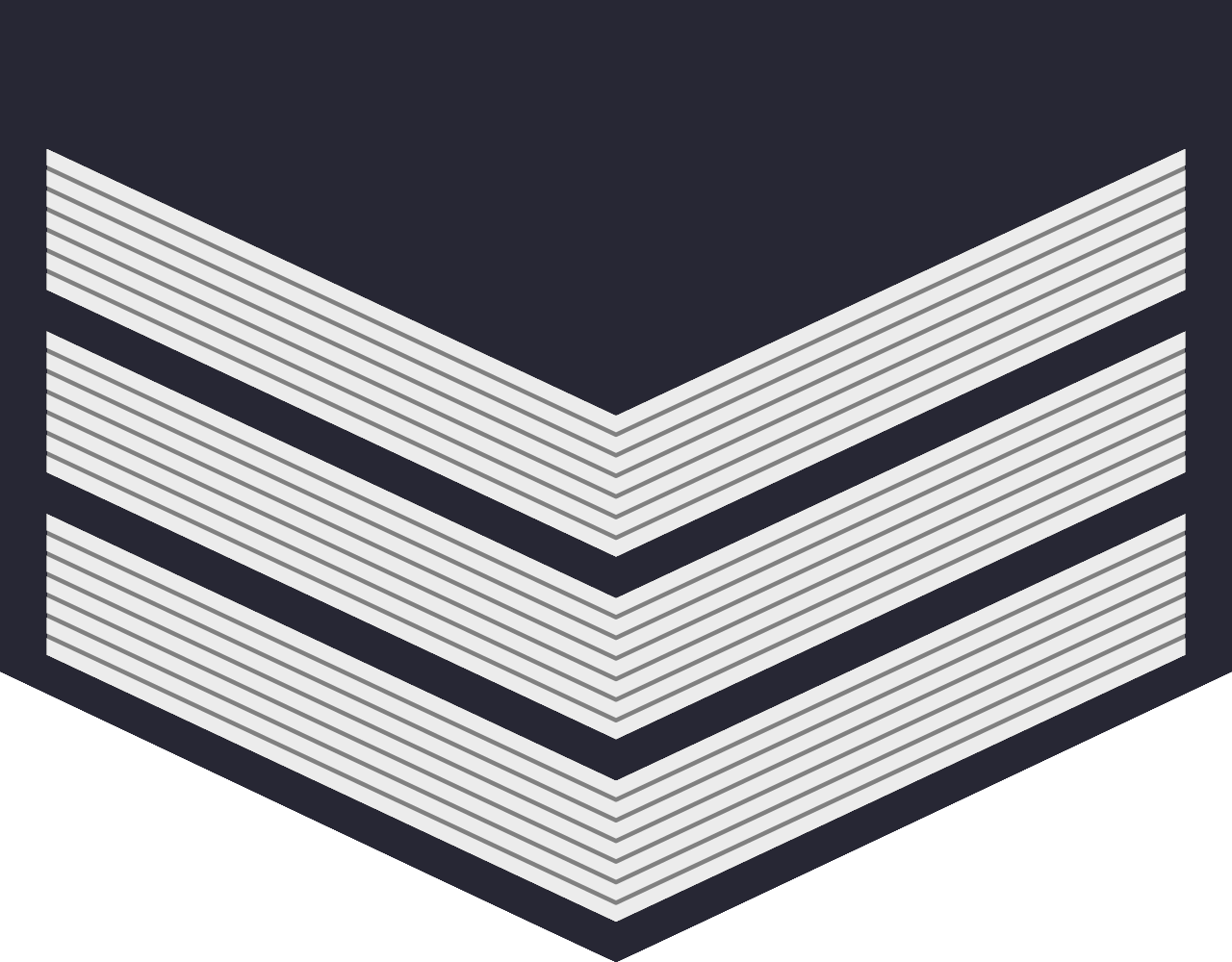
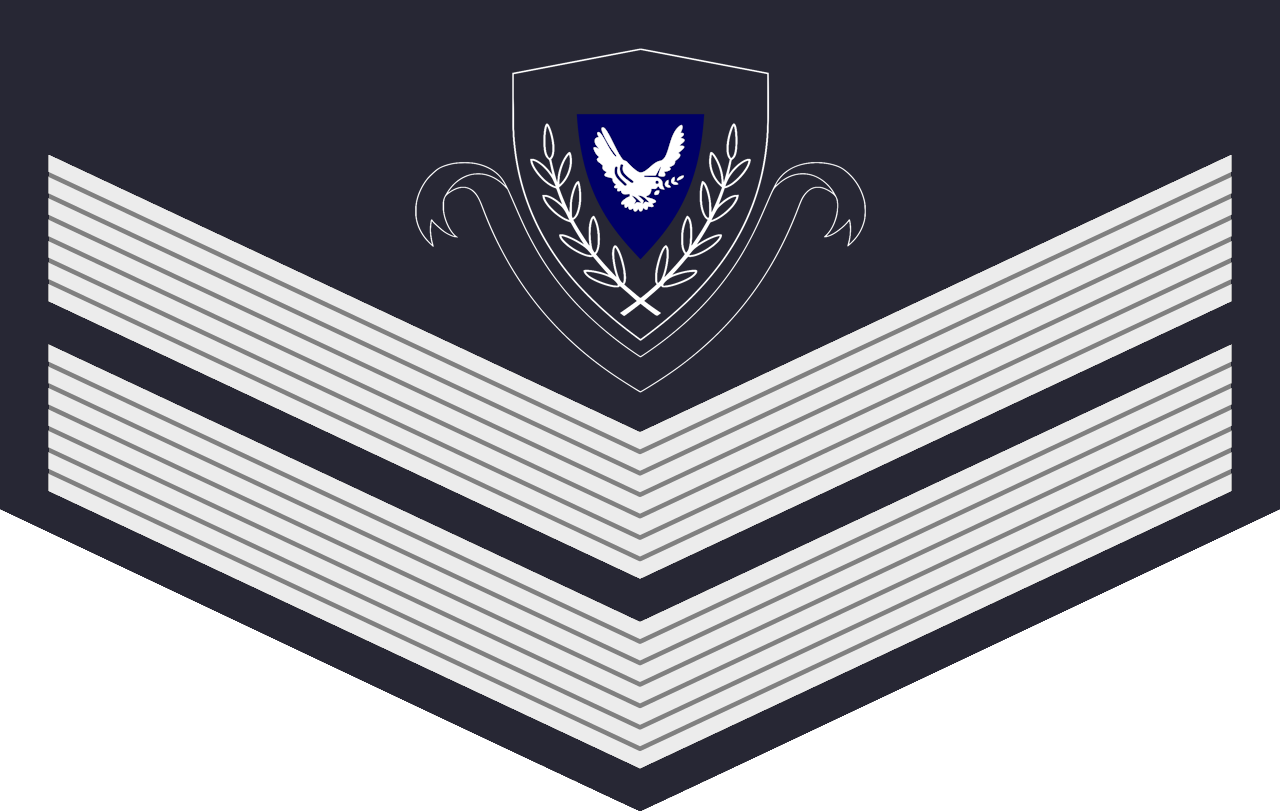
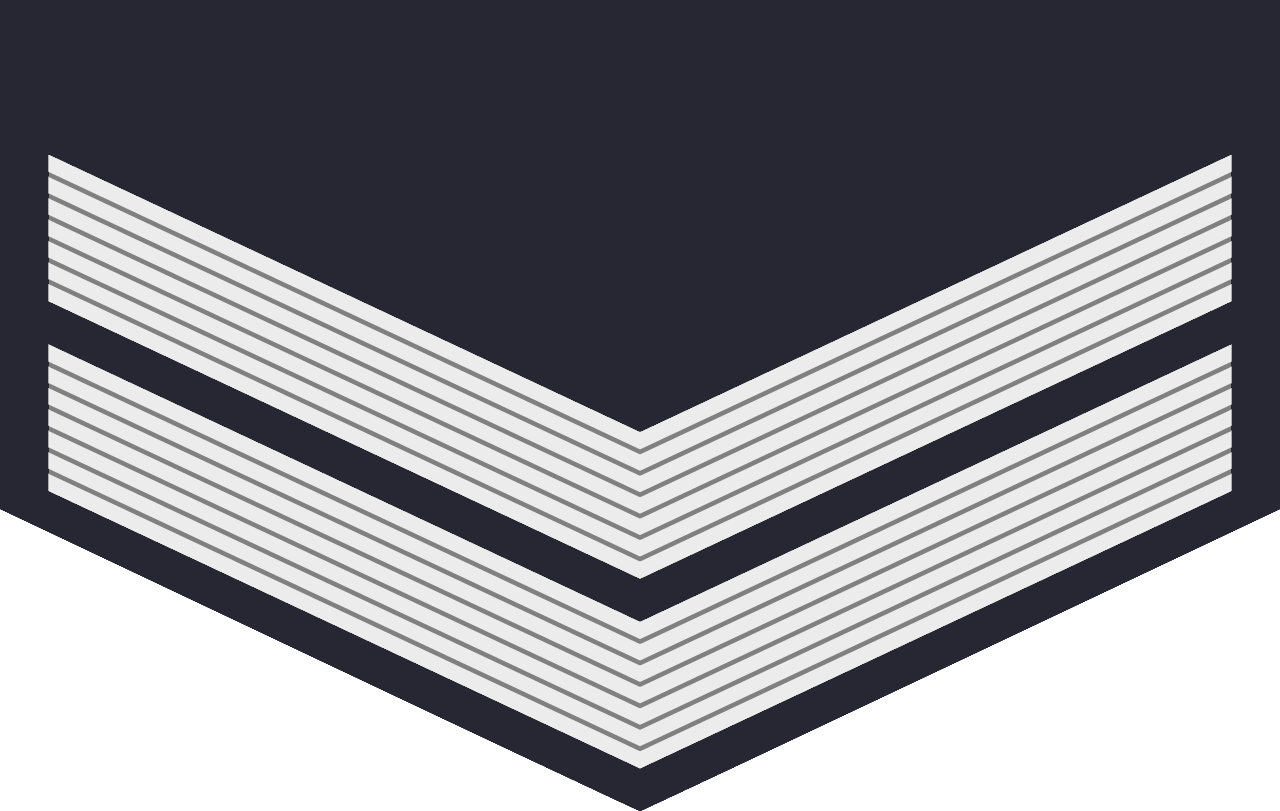
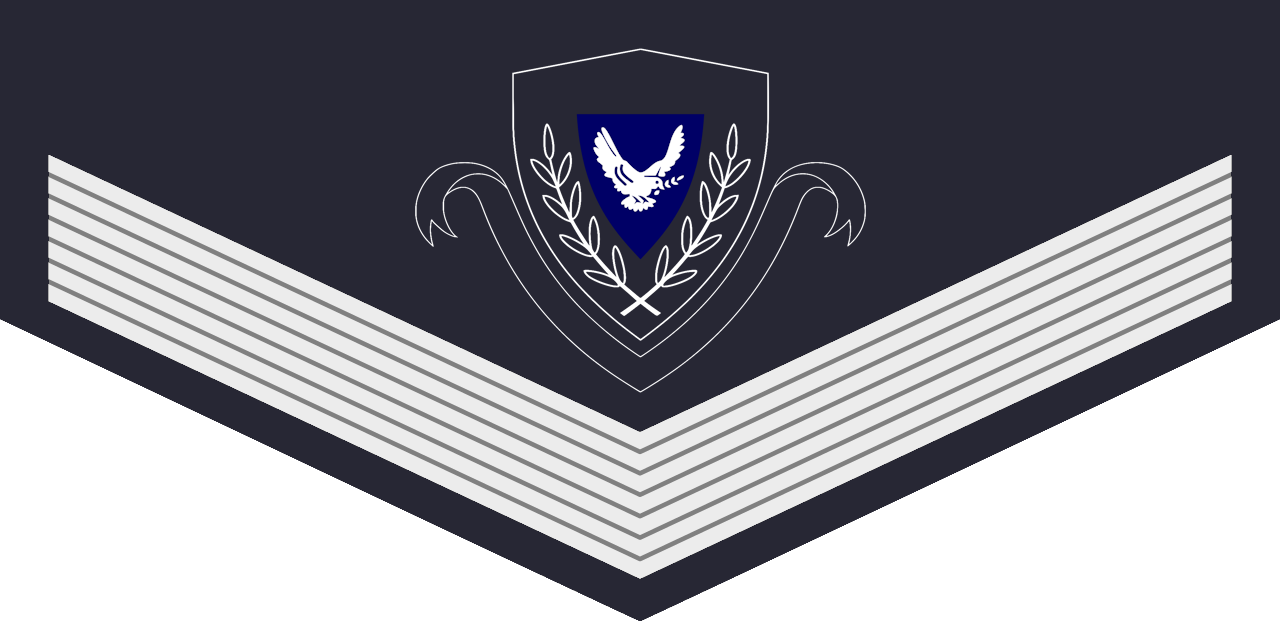
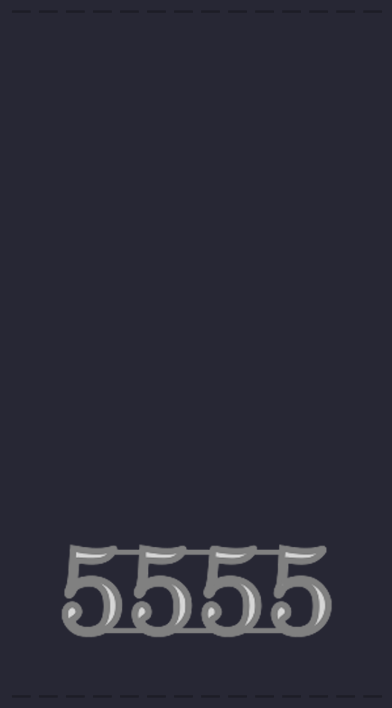
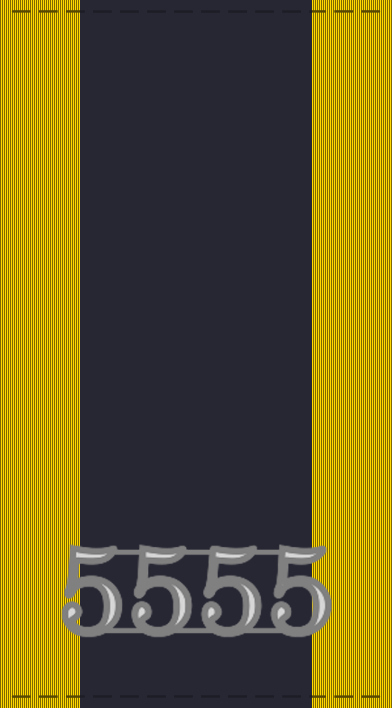
Insignia	Name	English
	Αρχηγός	Chief of police
	Υπαρχηγός	Deputy chief of police
	Βοηθός Αρχηγός	Assistant chief of police
	Ανώτερος Αστυνόμος	Chief superintendent
	Αστυνόμος Α'	Superintendent A'
	Αστυνόμος Β'	Superintendent B'
	Ανώτερος Υπαστυνόμος	Chief inspector
	Υπαστυνόμος	Inspector
	Αρχιλοχίας	Senior sergeant
	Λοχίας	Sergeant
	Αναπληρωτής Λοχίας Αρχιαστυφύλακας	Acting sergeant senior constable
	Αναπληρωτής Λοχίας	Acting sergeant
	Αρχιαστυφύλακας	Senior constable
	Αστυφύλακας	Constable
	Ειδικός Αστυφύλακας	Special constable

== Czech Republic ==
=== Officers ===
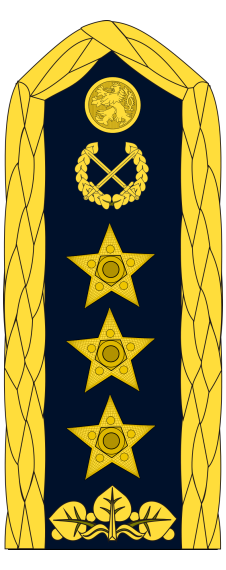
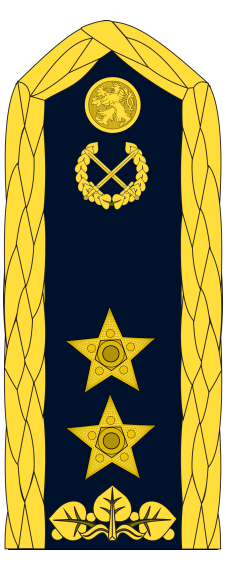
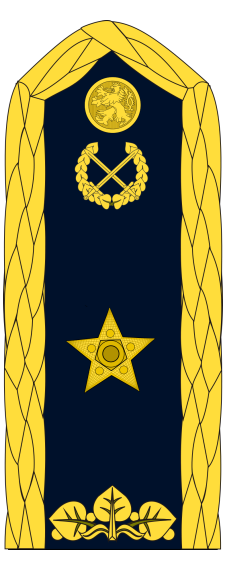
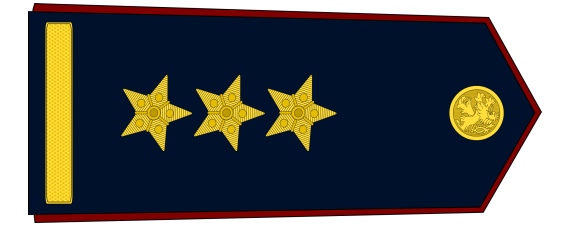
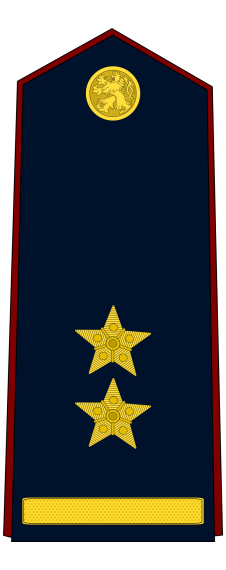
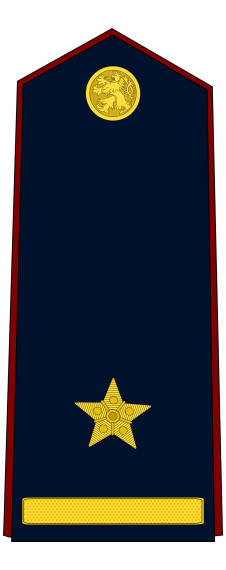
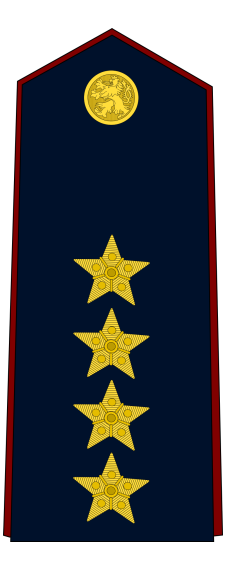
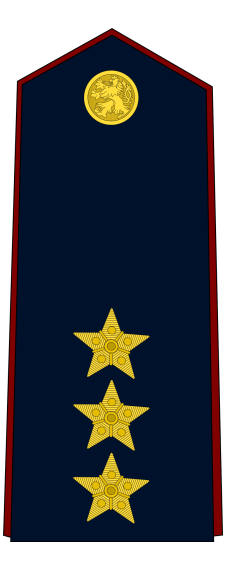
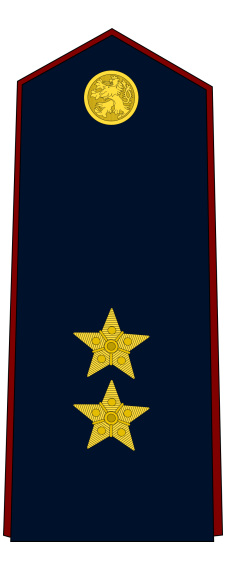
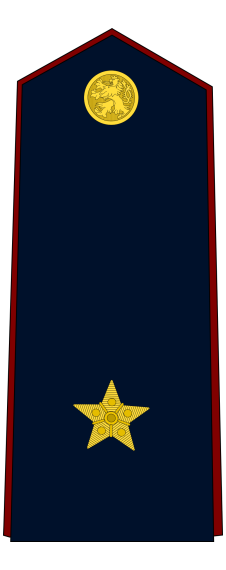
Rank group	General / flag officers			Senior officers			Junior officers
Czech Republic
Czech Republic	Generálporučík	Generálmajor	Brigádní generál	Plukovník	Podplukovník	Major	Kapitán	Nadporučík	Poručík	Podporučík

=== Others ===
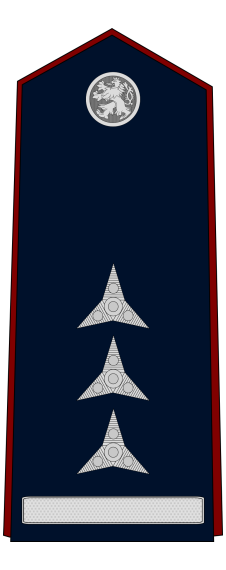
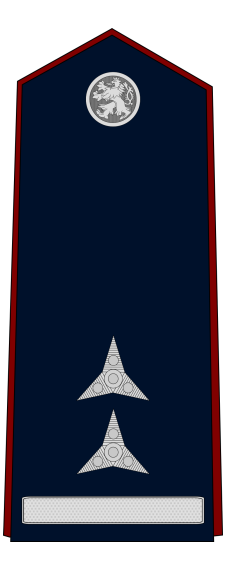
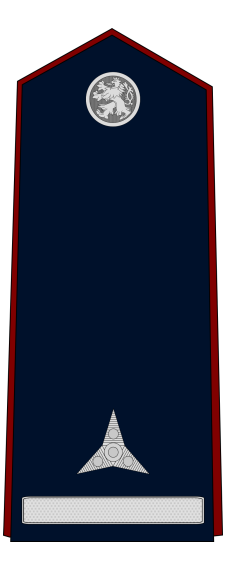
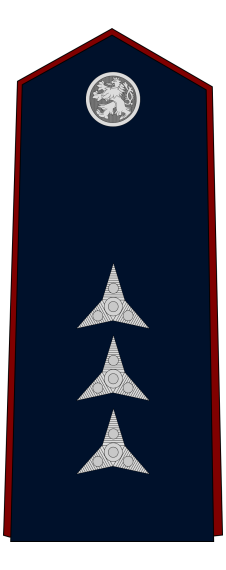
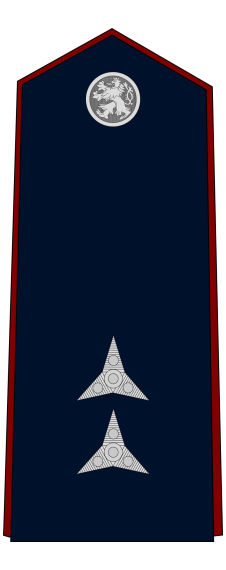
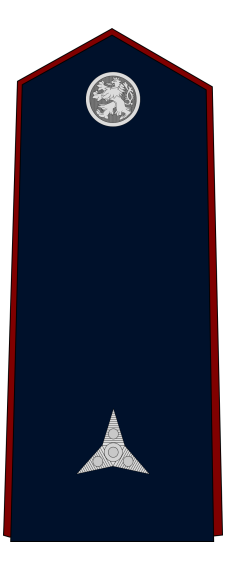
Rank group	Senior NCOs			Junior NCOs		Enlisted
Czech Republic
Czech Republic	Nadpraporčík	Praporčík	Podpraporčík	Nadstrážmistr	Strážmistr	Rotný

== Denmark ==
Danish National Police rank insignia
Police of Denmark

Rank
Rigspolitichefen
Politidirektør
Vicepolitidirektør
Vicerigspolitichef
Politimester
Chefpolitiinspektør
Chefanklager
Vicepolitimester
Chefanklager
Politiinspektør
Chefpolitiinspektør
Vicepolitiinspektør
Politikommissær
Politiassistent af 1. grad
Politiassistent af 2. grad
Politibetjent
Politikadet
EN Rank
National police commissioner
Chief of police
Chief inspector /
chief prosecutor
Deputy chief of police /
chief inspector /
inspector
Deputy inspector
Commissioner
Police constable first class
Police constable
Police officer
Police cadet

== Estonia ==
=== Officers ===
	General officers		Senior officers			Junior officers
Police and Border Guard Board
Police and Border Guard Board	Police general (Politseikindral)	Inspector general of police (Politseikindralinspektor)	Police colonel (Politseikolonel)	Police lieutenant colonel (Politseikolonelleitnant)	Police major (Politseimajor)	Police captain (Politseikapten)	Police lieutenant (Politseileitnant)	Senior superintendent (Vanemkomissar)	Superintendent (Komissar)

=== Others ===
	Constables
Police and Border Guard Board
Police and Border Guard Board	Chief constable, chief inspector (Ülemkonstaabel, üleminspektor)	Senior constable, senior inspector (Vanemkonstaabel, vaneminspektor)	Constable, inspector (Konstaabel, inspektor)	Junior constable, junior inspector (Nooremkonstaabel, nooreminspektor)
Internal Security Service ranks	Chief assistant (Ülemassistent)	Senior assistant (Vanemassistent)	Assistant (Assistent)	Junior assistant (Nooremassistent)

== Finland ==
Police ranks of Finland
Group	Officers							
Insignia								
Rank	Poliisiylijohtaja; Polisöverdirektör	Poliisijohtaja; Polisdirektör	Poliisipäällikkö; Polischef	Poliisiylitarkastaja; Polisöverinspektör	Apulais-poliisipäällikkö; Biträdande polischef	Poliisitarkastaja; Polisinspektör	Ylikomisario; Överkommissarie	Komisario; Kommissarie
English	National police commissioner	Deputy national police commissioners, Police chief of Helsinki, Director of the NBI, Director of the Supo	Police chief (Regional police departments)	Assistant police commissioners (chief), Deputy assistant police commissioners (expert)	Deputy police chiefs	Chief superintendents, police legal officers	Superintendents	Chief inspectors
Group	Non-commissioned officers	Policemen						
Insignia								
Rank	Ylikonstaapeli; Överkonstapel	Vanhempi konstaapeli Äldre konstapel	Nuorempi konstaapeli Yngre konstapel					
English	Police sergeants	Senior constables	Junior constables					

== France ==
=== Police Nationale ===
National Police of France	Director general	Prefectoral corps	Directors of active service
Rank insignia			
Grade	Directeur général (Director general of the National Police)	Préfet de police de Paris/ Préfet de police des Bouches-du-Rhône (Police Prefect of Paris/ Police Prefect of Bouches-du-Rhône)	Directeur des services actifs (Director of active services of the National Police)
Equivalent NATO code	OF-9	N/A	OF-8

National Police of France	Planning and management corps					
Rank insignia						
Grade	Inspecteur général des services actifs de la police nationale (Inspector general of the National Police)	Contrôleur général des services actifs de la police nationale (Comptroller general of the National Police)	Commissaire général de police (Commissioner general of police)	Commissaire divisionnaire de police (Divisional commissioner of police)	Commissaire de police (Commissioner of police)	Commissaire de police - Élève et stagiaire (Probationary commissioner of police/ Commissioner of police candidate
Equivalent NATO code	OF-7	OF-6		OF-5	OF-3/4	N/A

National Police of France	Command corps						
Rank insignia							
Grade	Commandant divisionnaire fonctionnel de la police nationale (Divisional commandant of police, in functional position)	Commandant divisionnaire (Divisional commandant of police)	Commandant de police (Commandant of police)	Capitaine de police (Captain of police)	Lieutenant de police (Lieutenant of police)	Lieutenant de police (stagiaire) (Probationary lieutenant of police)	Lieutenant de police - Élève (Police commander candidate)
Equivalent NATO code	OF-5	OF-4	OF-3	OF-2	OF-1		OF(D)

National Police of France	Supervisory and field corps						
Rank insignia							
Grade	Major de police, responsable d’unité locale de police (Major of police, head of a local police unit)	Major de police à l’échelon exceptionnel (Major of police, in exceptional pay grade)	Major de police (Major of police)	Brigadier-chef de police (Chief brigadier of police)	Gardien de la paix (Police officer)	Gardien de la paix - Stagiaire (Probationary police officer)	Gardien de la paix - Élève (Police officer candidate)
Equivalent NATO code	N/A		OR-9		OR-5		N/A

National Police of France	Auxiliaries
Rank insignia	
Grade	Policier Adjoint (Auxiliary Police)
Equivalent NATO code	N/A

=== Gendarmerie ===
Officers

NATO code	OF-10	OF-9	OF-8	OF-7	OF-6	OF-5	OF-4	OF-3	OF-2	OF-1
(France) French Gendarmerie
(France) French Gendarmerie		Général d'armée	Général de corps d'armée	Général de division	Général de brigade	Colonel	Lieutenant-Colonel	Chef d'Escadron	Capitaine	Lieutenant	Sous-Lieutenant

Non-commissioned offices and volunteer assistant gendarmes

NATO code	OR-9		OR-8	OR-7	OR-6	OR-5			OR-4	OR-3	OR-2	OR-1
(France) French Gendarmerie
(France) French Gendarmerie	Major	Adjudant-chef	Adjudant		Maréchal-des-logis-chef	Gendarme	Gendarme sous contrat	Gendarme Adjoint Maréchal-des-logis	Gendarme Adjoint Brigadier Chef	Gendarme Adjoint Brigadier	Gendarme Adjoint première classe	Gendarme Adjoint

== Germany ==
Higher Police Service

(Germany) Bundespolizei
(Germany) Bundespolizei	Präsident des Bundespolizeipräsidiums President of the Federal Police Headquarters	Vizepräsident des Bundespolizeipräsidiums Vice president of the Federal Police Headquarters	Präsident einer Bundespolizeidirektion der Bundespolizei President of a Federal Police directorate	Vizepräsident in einer Bundespolizeidirektion der Bundespolizei Vice Department Chief of a Federal Police directorate	Leitender Polizeidirektor Senior chief superintendent	Polizeidirektor Chief superintendent	Polizeioberrat Senior superintendent	Polizeirat Superintendent	Polizeireferendar Trainee superintendent
NATO code equivalent	OF-9	OF-8	OF-7	OF-6	OF-5a	OF-5b	OF-4	OF-3	N/A

=== Elevated Police Service ===
(Germany) Bundespolizei
(Germany) Bundespolizei	Erster Polizeihauptkommissar First chief inspector	Polizeihauptkommissar Chief inspector	Polizeioberkommissar Senior inspector	Polizeikommissar Inspector	Polizeikommissaranwärter Trainee inspector
NATO code equivalent	OF-2		OF-1a	OF-1b	OF (D)

=== Middle Police Service ===
(Germany) Bundespolizei
(Germany) Bundespolizei	Polizeihauptmeister (mit Zulage) Staff sergeant (with extra salary)	Polizeihauptmeister Sergeant	Polizeiobermeister Senior officer	Polizeimeister Officer	Polizeimeisteranwärter Trainee officer
NATO code equivalent	OR-9	OR-8	OR-7/8	OR-6	N/A

=== Police support employees ===
(Germany) Bundespolizei
(Germany) Bundespolizei	Unterstützungskraft der Deutschen Bundespolizei Border support officer Federal support officer Law enforcement support officer
NATO code equivalent	OR-5

== Greece ==
Officers

Rank group	General / flag officers			Senior officers			Junior officers
Hellenic Police
Hellenic Police	Police Lieutenant General	Police Major General	Police Brigadier General	Police Director	Police Deputy Director	Police Captain I/Police major	Police Captain II	Police Lieutenant I	Police Lieutenant II
Hellenic Police	Αντιστράτηγος	Υποστράτηγος	Ταξίαρχος	Αστυνομικός Διευθυντής	Αστυνομικός Υποδιευθυντής	Αστυνόμος Α'	Αστυνόμος Β'	Υπαστυνόμος Α'	Υπαστυνόμος Β'

NCO and enlisted

Rank group	Senior NCOs				Junior NCOs		Enlisted
Hellenic Police							No insignia
Hellenic Police	Police Deputy Lieutenant/Warrant officer	Police Sergeant (Investigative Duties - With Promotional Exams)	Police Sergeant (Investigative Duties)	Police Sergeant	Police Deputy Sergeant (Investigative Duties)	Police Deputy Sergeant	Police Constable
Hellenic Police	Ανθυπαστυνόμος	Αρχιφύλακας (Ανακριτικός Υπάλληλος - Με εξετάσεις)	Αρχιφύλακας (Ανακριτικός Υπάλληλος)	Αρχιφύλακας	Υπαρχιφύλακας (Ανακριτικός Υπάλληλος)	Υπαρχιφύλακας	Αστυφύλακας

== Hungary ==
Officers

Rank group	General / flag officers			Senior officers			Junior officers
(Hungary) Rendőrség										No insignia
(Hungary) Rendőrség	Altábornagy; Lieutenant general	Vezérőrnagy; Major general	Dandártábornok; Brigadier general	Ezredes; Colonel	Alezredes; Lieutenant colonel	Őrnagy; Major	Százados; Captain	Főhadnagy; First lieutenant	Hadnagy; Second lieutenant	Honvédtisztjelölt

Others

Rank group	Senior NCOs						Junior NCOs	Enlisted
(Hungary) Rendőrség
(Hungary) Rendőrség	Főtörzszászlós; Chief warrant officer	Törzszászlós; Master warrant officer	Zászlós; Warrant officer	Főtörzsőrmester; Sergeant first class	Törzsőrmester; Staff sergeant	Őrmester; Sergeant

== Iceland ==
Insignia									
Title	Ríkislögreglustjóri		Lögreglustjóri	Aðstoðarríkislögreglustjóri	Aðstoðarlögreglustjóri	Yfirlögregluþjónn	Aðstoðaryfirlögregluþjónn	Aðalvarðstjóri	Lögreglufulltrúi
English translation	National Police commissioner		Police commissioner	Deputy National Police commissioner	Deputy police commissioner	Chief superintendent	Superintendent	Chief inspector	Detective chief inspector
Insignia									
Title	Varðstjóri	Rannsóknarlögreglumaður	Lögreglumaður		Lögreglunemi	Afleysingamaður í lögreglu	Héraðslögreglumaður		
English translation	Inspector	Detective inspector	Police constable		Police cadet	Temporary replacement police constable	Temporarily hired constable		

== Republic of Ireland ==
Ranks of the Garda Síochána
Rank	Commissioner	Deputy commissioner	Assistant commissioner	Chief superintendent	Superintendent	Inspector	Sergeant	Garda	Garda reserve	Student	Student reserve
Irish name	Coimisinéir	Leas; Choimisinéir	Cúntóir- Choimisinéir	Ard-Cheannfort	Ceannfort	Cigire	Sáirsint	Garda	Garda Ionaid	Mac Léinn Gharda	Mac Léinn Ionaid
Max number	1	3	12	53	191	500	2,460	12,500			
Number as of 28 February 2025	1	2	7	46	166	482	2,208	11,234	318		
Insignia	Rank insignia of Garda Commissioner	Rank insignia of Garda Deputy Commissioner	Rank insignia of Garda Assistant Commissioner	Rank Insignia of Garda Chief Superindendent	Rank insignia of Garda Superintendent	Rank insignia of Garda Inspector					

== Italy ==
=== Polizia di Stato ===
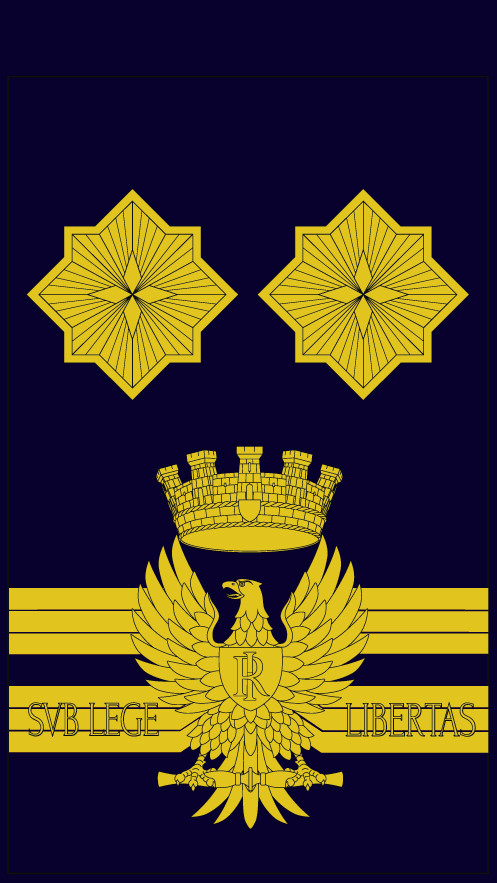
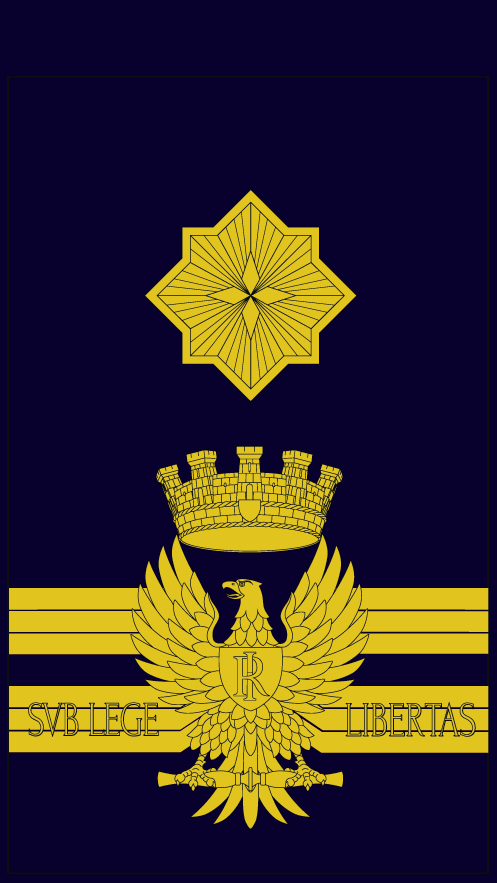
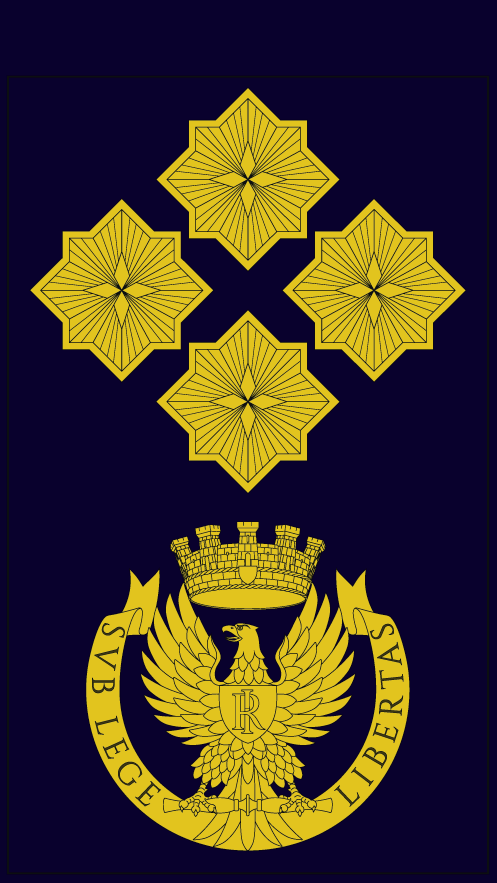
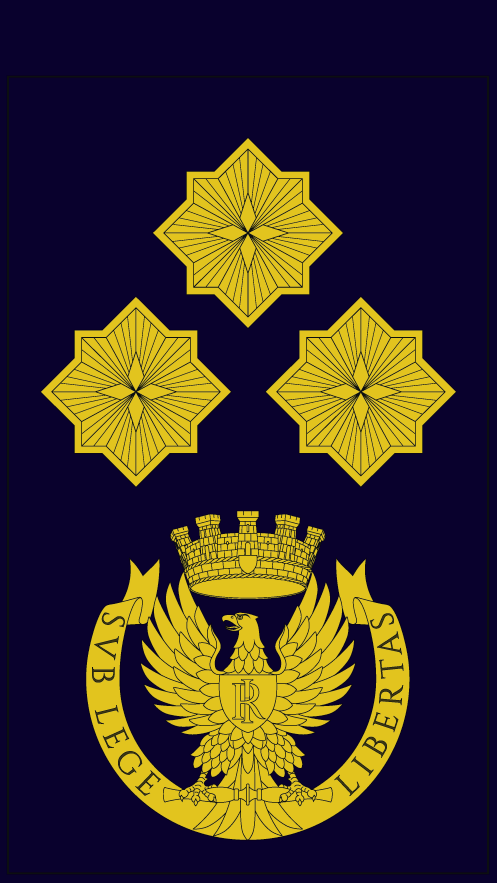
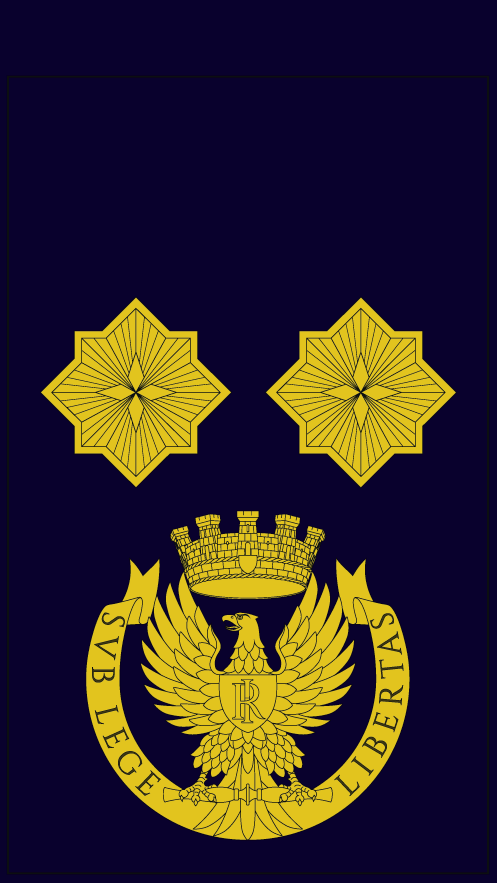
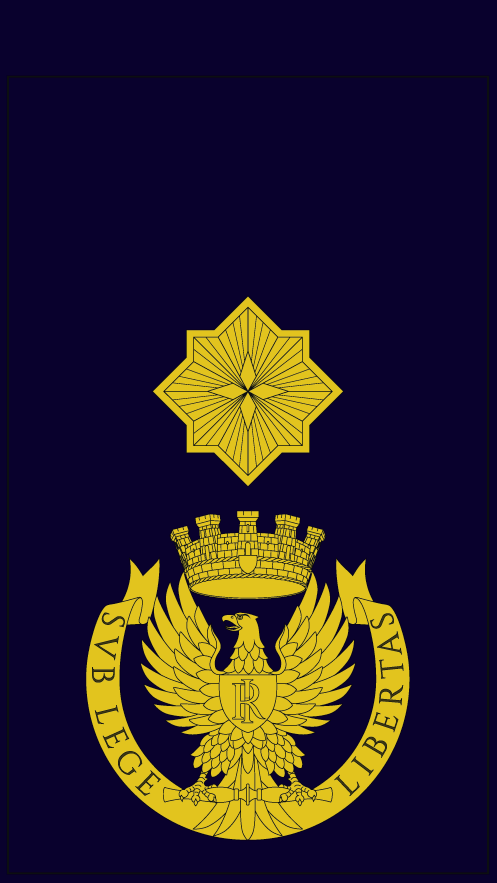
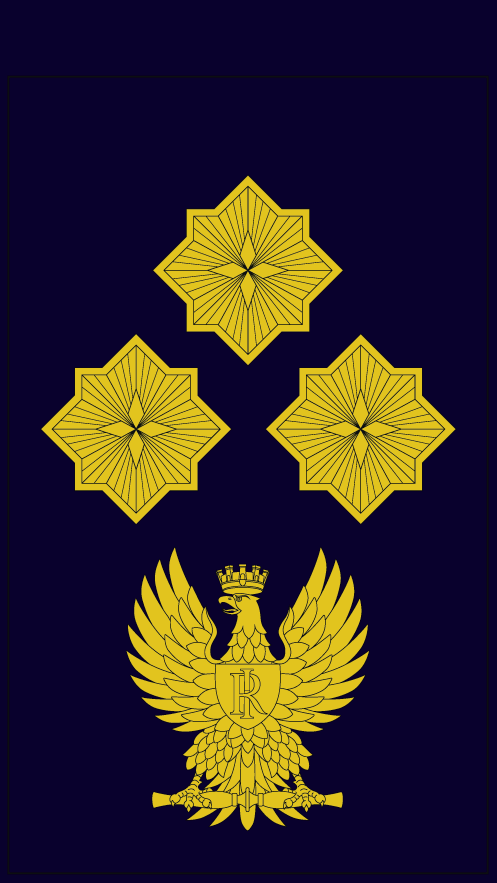
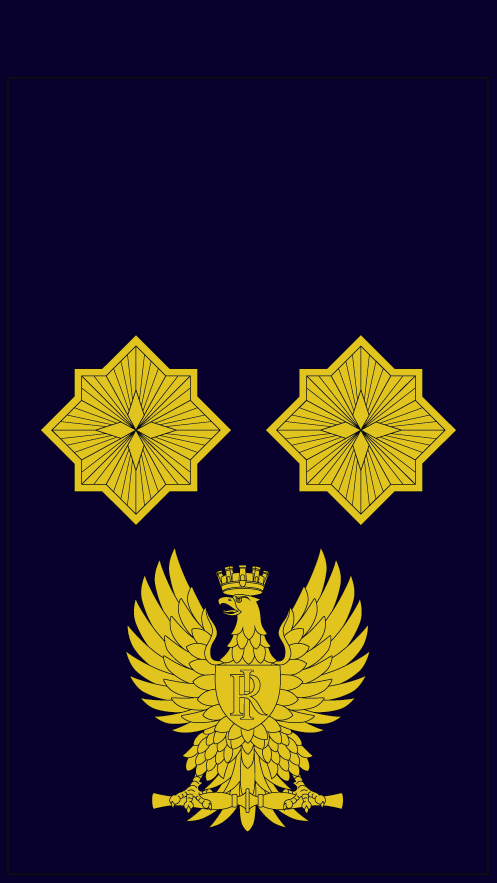
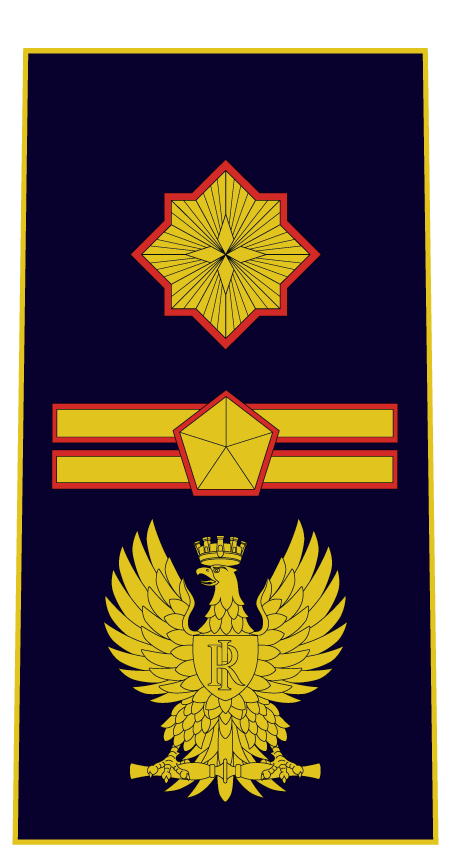
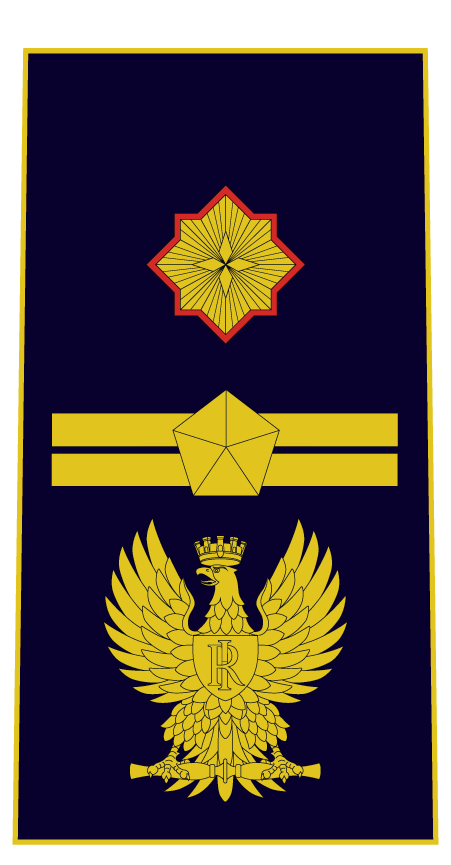
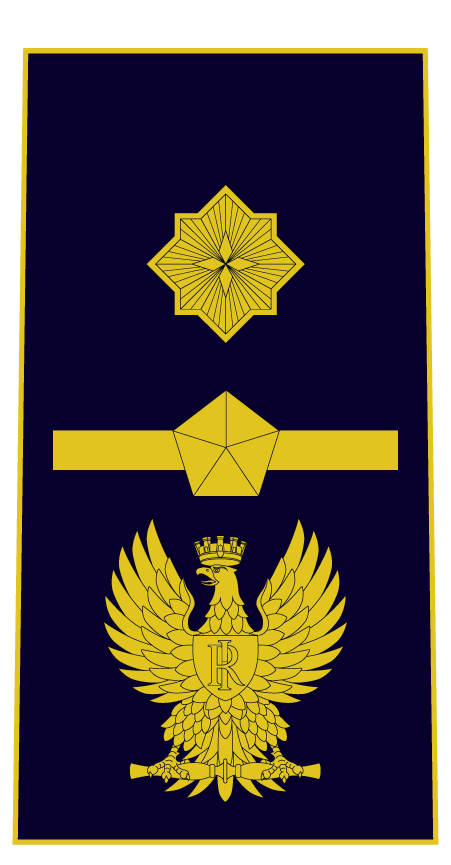
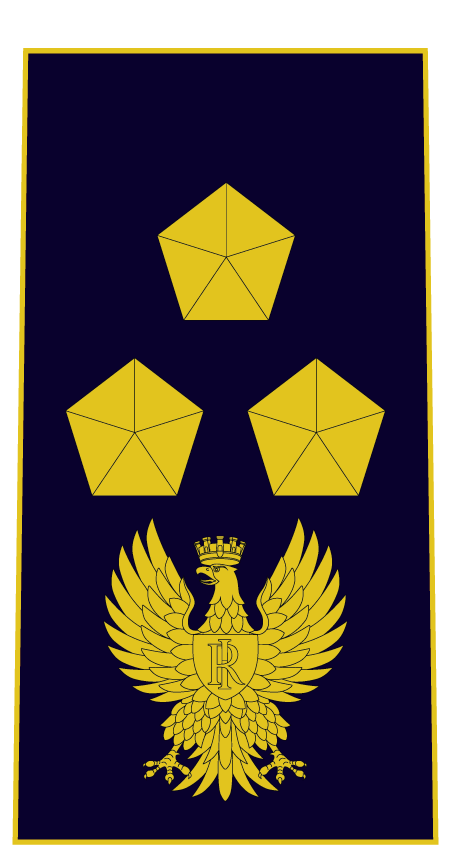
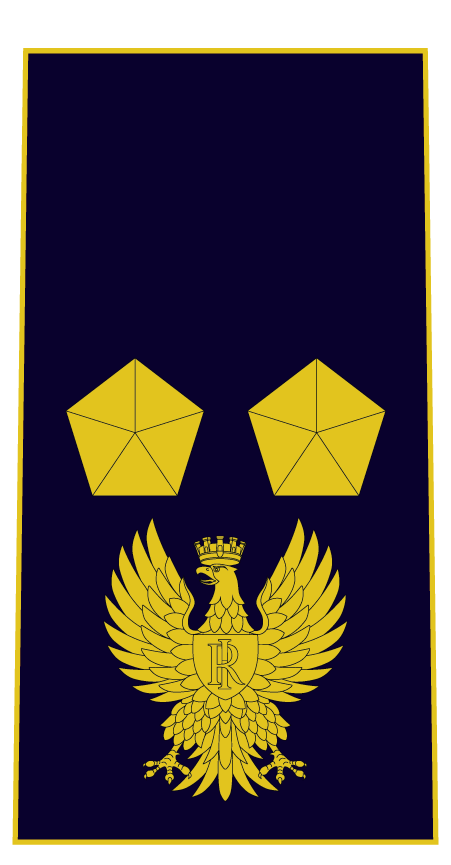
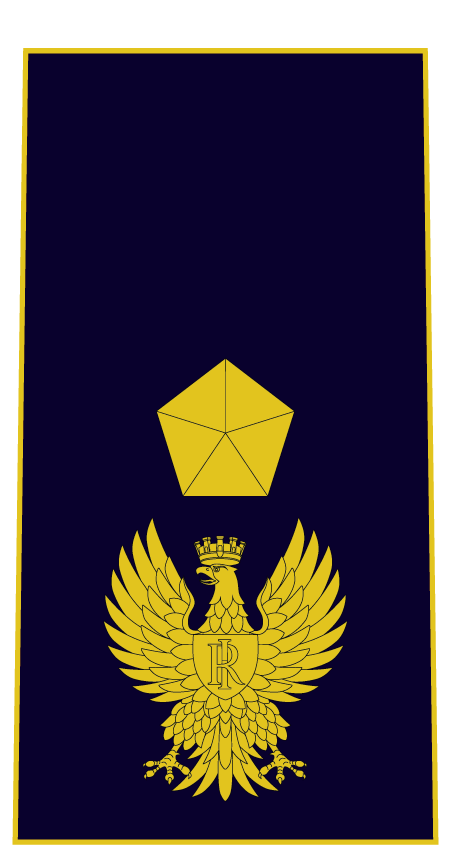
Police commissioners			Police superintendents					Police inspectors
Dirigente generale di pubblica sicurezza	Dirigente superiore	Primo dirigente	Vice questore	Vice questore aggiunto	Commissario capo	Commissario	Vice commissario	Sostituto commissario coordinatore	Sostituto commissario	Ispettore superiore	Ispettore capo	Ispettore	Vice ispettore

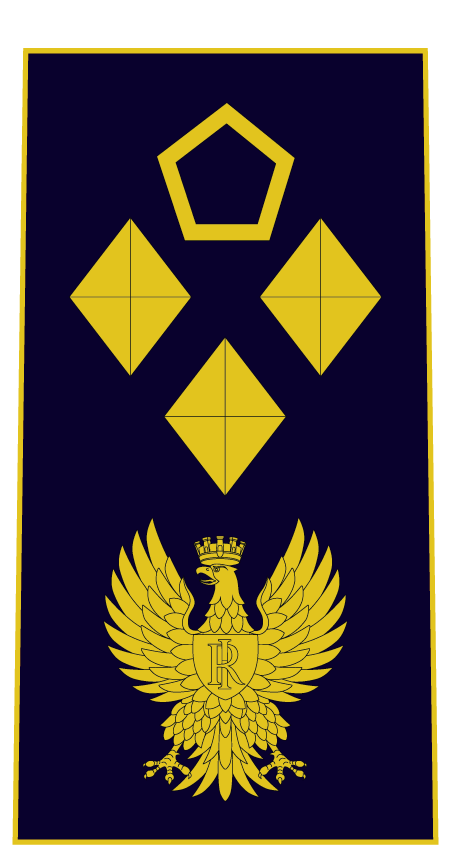
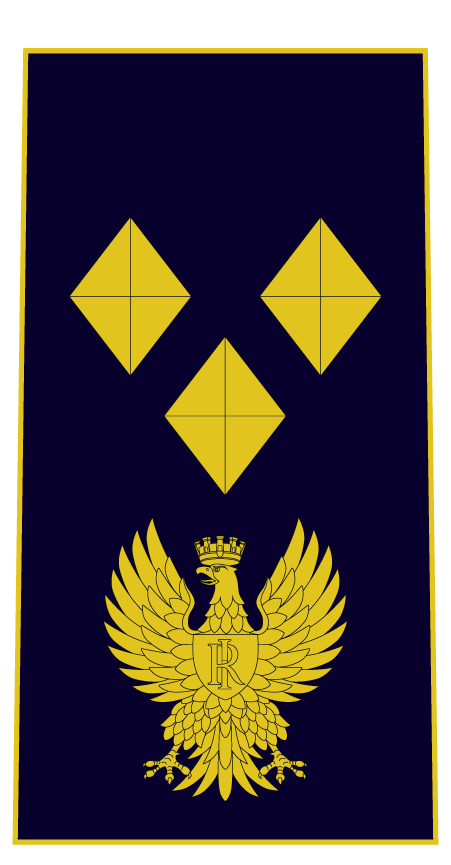
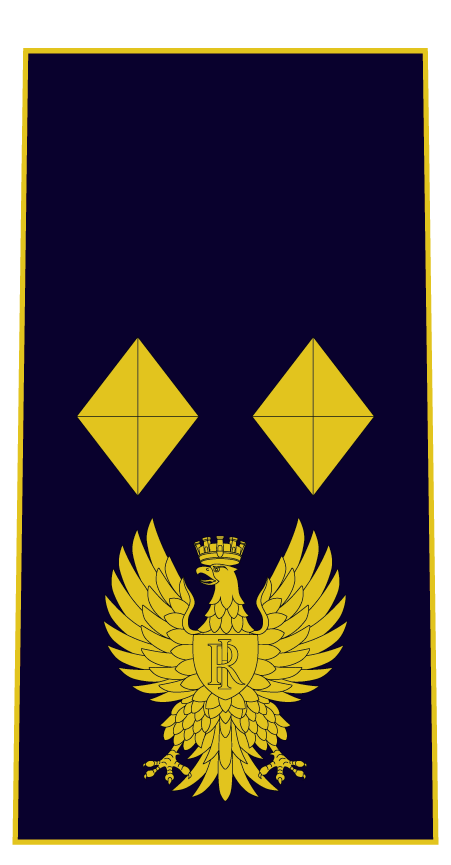
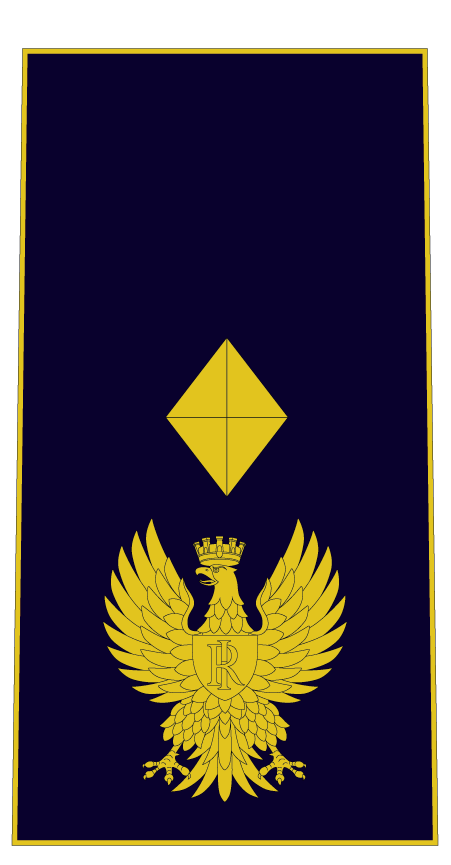
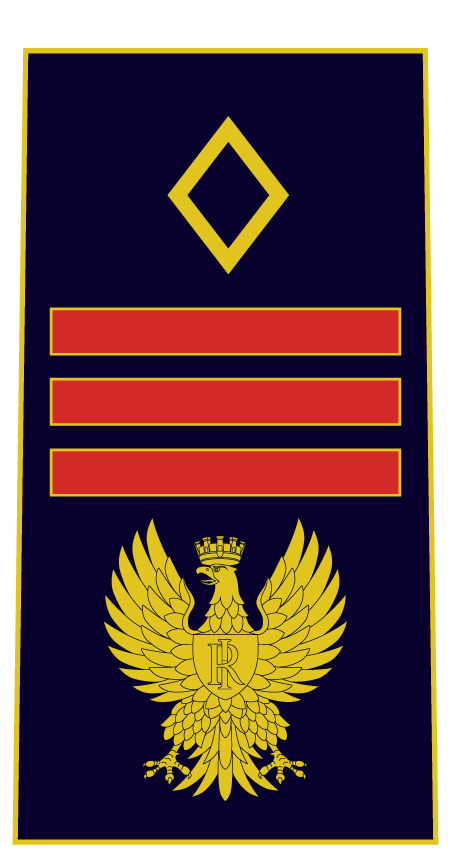
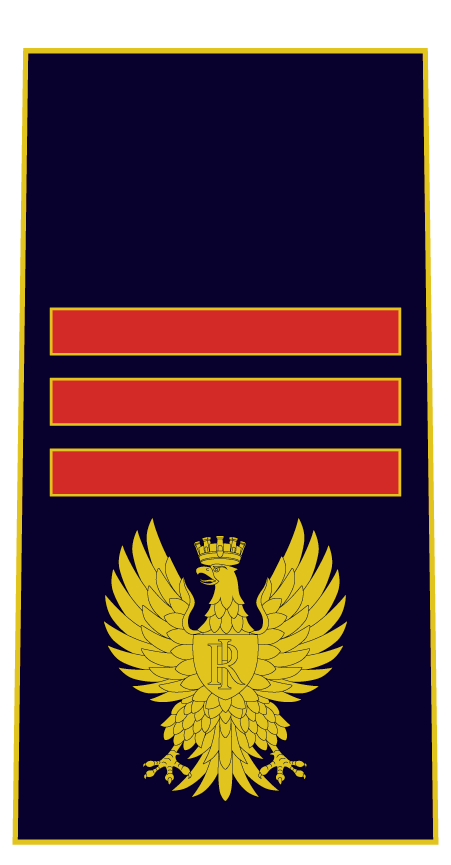
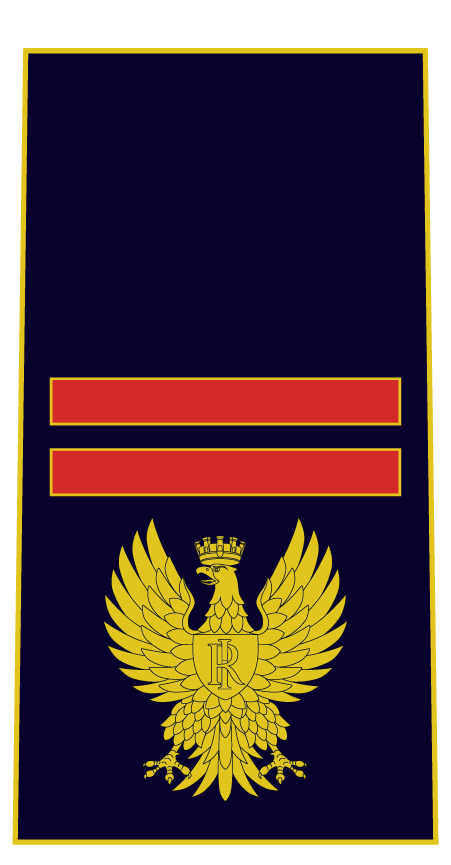
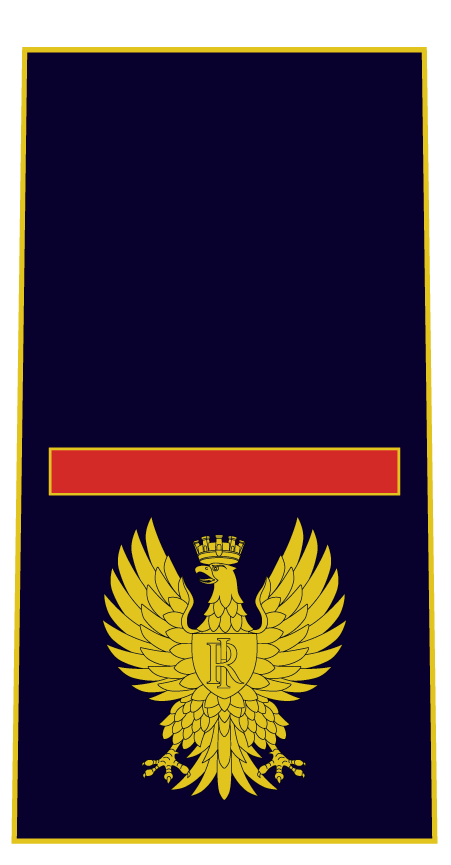
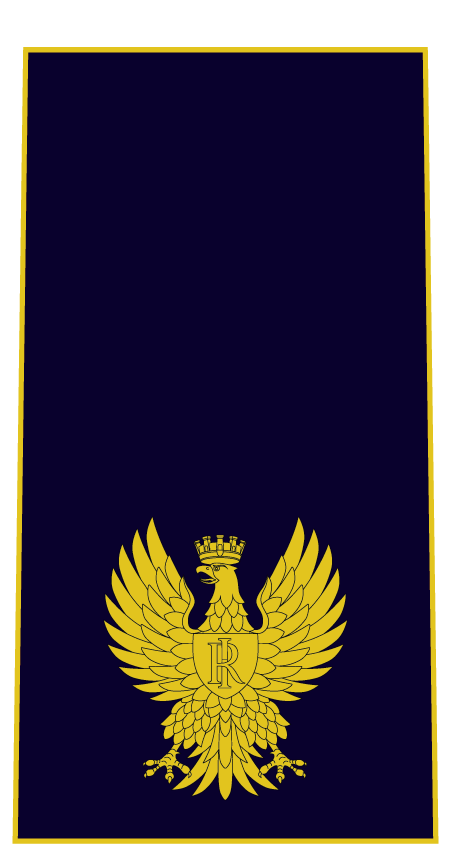
Police sergeants				Police constables
Sovrintendente capo coordinatore	Sovrintendente capo	Sovrintendente	Vice sovrintendente	Assistente capo coordinatore	Assistente capo	Assistente	Agente scelto	Agente

=== Carabinieri ===
Officers

NATO code	OF-10	OF-9	OF-8		OF-7	OF-6	OF-5	OF-4	OF-3	OF-2		OF-1
Italian Carabinieri
Italian Carabinieri		Comandante generale dell'arma dei carabinieri	Vicecomandante generale dell'arma dei carabinieri	Generale di corpo d'armata	Generale di divisione	Generale di brigata	Colonnello	Tenente colonnello	Maggiore	Primo capitano	Capitano	Tenente	Sottotenente

Others

NATO code	OR-9				OR-8		OR-7		OR-6	OR-5	OR-4	OR-3	OR-2	OR-1
Italian Carabinieri											Appuntato scelto q.s. / Appuntato scelto / Appuntato / Carabiniere scelto / Carabiniere
Italian Carabinieri	Primo luogotenente c.s. s.u.p.s	Luogotenente s.u.p.s.	Primo Maresciallo	Maresciallo Capo	Maresciallo Ordinario	Maresciallo	Brigadiere capo q.s.	Brigadiere capo	Brigadiere	Vicebrigadiere	Appuntato scelto q.s. / Appuntato scelto / Appuntato / Carabiniere scelto / Carabiniere

=== Guardia di Finanza ===
Officers

NATO code	OF-10	OF-9	OF-8		OF-7	OF-6	OF-5	OF-4	OF-3	OF-2		OF-1
Italy
Italy		Comandante generale della Guardia di finanza^{1}	Vicecomandante generale della Guardia di finanza^{2}	Generale di corpo d'armata	Generale di divisione	Generale di brigata	Colonnello	Tenente colonnello	Maggiore	Primo capitano	Capitano	Tenente	Sottotenente
Italy		Corps commanding general	Deputy corps commanding general	Corps general	Divisional general	Brigade general	Colonel	Lieutenant colonel	Major	First captain	Captain	Lieutenant	Sub-lieutenant
Notes:
^{1} The duty of "comandante generale della Guardia di finanza" (corps commanding general) is assigned to a single "generale di corpo d'armata" (corps general).
^{2} The duty of "vicecomandante generale della Guardia di finanza" (deputy corps commanding general) is assigned to a single "generale di corpo d'armata" (corps general).

Non-commissioned officers

NATO Code	OR-9			OR-8		OR-7	OR-6	OR-5	OR-4
epaulette
Italian rank name English rank name translation	luogotenente^{1} s.u.p.s. sub-lieutenant s.o.p.s.	maresciallo aiutante s.u.p.s.^{2} marshal adjutant s.o.p.s.	maresciallo capo chief marshal	maresciallo ordinario ordinary marshal	maresciallo marshal	brigadiere capo chief brigadier	brigadiere brigadier	vice brigadiere vice-brigadier	appuntato scelto chosen appointee	appuntato appointee	finanziere scelto chosen financier	finanziere^{3} financier
Notes:^{1} The duty of a sostituto ufficiale di pubblica sicurezza luogotenente (substitute officer of public security sub-lieutenant) is not a rank but a position (or function) attributed only to NCOs with the rank of "maresciallo aiutante" (marshal adjutant) with at least 15 years of experience in the rank.^{2} The title of "sostituto ufficiale di pubblica sicurezza" or "s.u.p.s." (substitute officer of public security – s.o.p.s.) is not a rank but a position attributed only to NCOs with the rank of "maresciallo aiutante".^{3} A simple financier does not wear rank insignia

== Latvia ==
The rank system of the Latvian State Police is as follows:

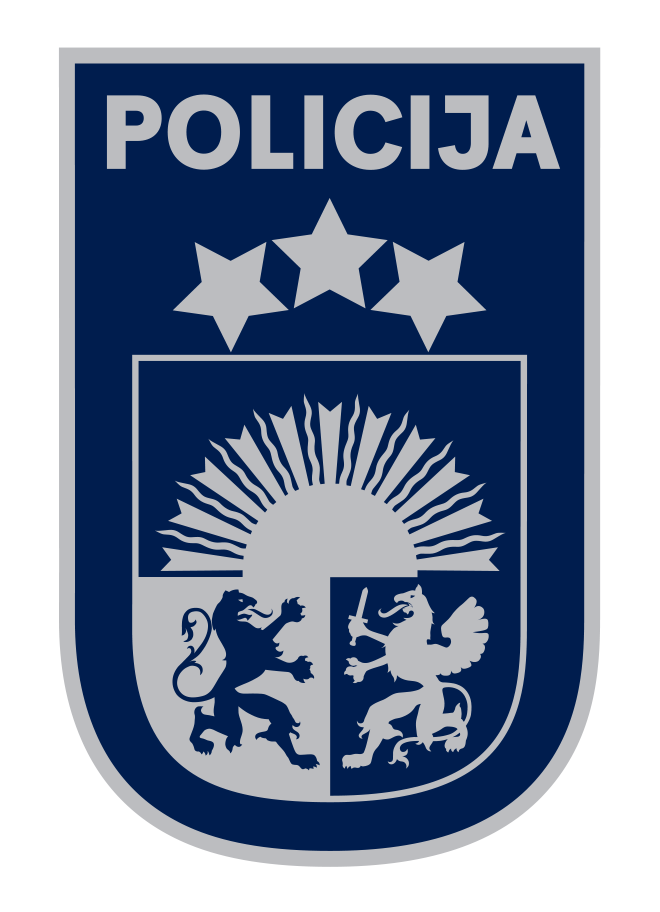
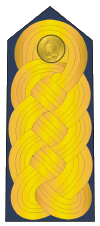
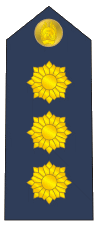
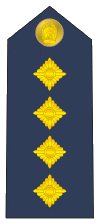
Rank group	Top level service	Higher police service			Elevated police service			Student	Middle police service			Simple service
	Policijas ģenerālis	Policijas pulkvedis	Policijas pulkvežleitnants	Policijas majors	Policijas kapteinis	Policijas virsleitnants	Policijas leitnants	Policijas kursants	Policijas virsnieka vietnieks	Policijas virsseržants	Policijas seržants	Policijas kaprālis	Policijas ierindnieks

== Lithuania ==
Rank group	Highest rank officer	Senior rank officers			Middle rank officers			First rank officers
Lithuanian Police
	Generalinis komisaras Commissioner general	Vyriausiasis komisaras Chief commissioner	Vyresnysis komisaras Senior commissioner	Komisaras Commissioner	Komisaras inspektorius Commissioner inspector	Vyresnysis inspektorius Senior inspector	Inspektorius Inspector	Viršila Sergeant (police)	Vyresnysis policininkas Senior police office	Policininkas Police officer	Jaunesnysis policininkas Junior police officer
NATO	OF-6	OF-5	OF-4	OF-3	OF-2	OF-1		OR-7	OR-6	OR-5	OR-4

== Luxembourg ==
Since the reform of 1 August 2018 the Grand Ducal Police of Luxembourg has two uniformed careers, the cadre policier supérieur (commissioners and management) and the cadre policier (inspectors); insignia are worn on a shoulder slide, in silver on a dark blue ground.

Rank group	Executive functions			Divisional commissioner level			
Grand Ducal Police							
Grand Ducal Police	Director general Directeur général	Assistant director general Directeur général adjoint	Central director Directeur central	First divisional commissioner Premier commissaire divisionnaire	Divisional commissioner Commissaire divisionnaire	First principal commissioner Premier commissaire principal	Principal commissioner Commissaire principal

Rank group	Commissioner level				Inspector level			
Grand Ducal Police								
Grand Ducal Police	Chief commissioner Commissaire en chef	First commissioner Premier commissaire	Commissioner; Commissaire	Assistant commissioner Commissaire adjoint	Chief inspector Inspecteur chef	First inspector Premier inspecteur	Inspector; Inspecteur	Assistant inspector Inspecteur adjoint

== North Macedonia ==
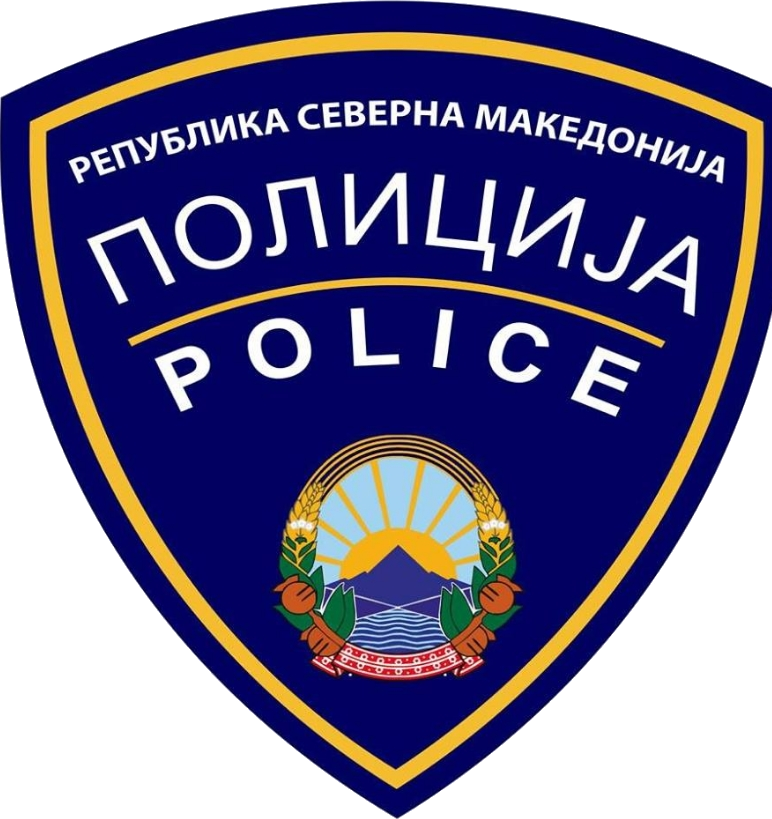
Categories	Commissioners				Inspectors					Police officers
North Macedonia
North Macedonia	Commissioner general Генерален полициски советник Generalen policiski sovetnik	Chief police commissioner Главен полициски советник Glaven policiski sovetnik	Senior police commissioner Виш полициски советник Viš policiski sovetnik	Police commissioner Полициски советник Policiski sovetnik	Chief inspector Главен инспектор Glaven inspektor	Assistant chief inspector Самостоен инспектор Samostoen inspektor	Senior inspector Виш инспектор Viš inspektor	Inspector; Инспектор; Inspektor	Sub-inspector; Помлад инспектор Pomlad inspektor	Sergeant; Главен полицаец Glaven policaec	Senior policeman Виш полицаец Viš policaec	Policeman; Полицаец; Policaec

== Malta ==
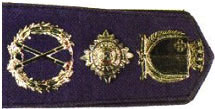
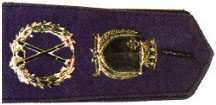
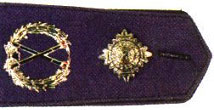
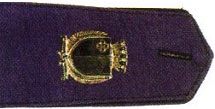
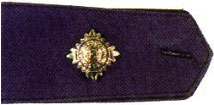
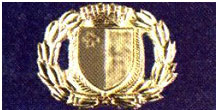
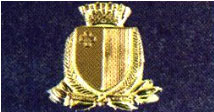
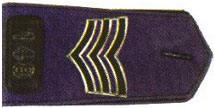
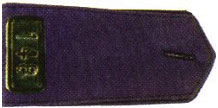
Insignia	Name	English
	Kummisarju	Commissioner of police
	Deputat Kummisarju	Deputy commissioner
	Assistent Kummisarju	Assistant commissioner
	Supretendent	Superintendent
	Spettur	Inspector
	Surġent Maġġur I	Sergeant major I
	Surġent Maġġur II	Sergeant major II
	Surġent	Police sergeant
	Kuntisstabli	Police constable

== Montenegro ==
Officers

	Police executives		Police inspectors
Police of Montenegro
Police of Montenegro	Direktor policije	Pomoćnik direktora policije	Glavni policijski inspektor	Viši policijski inspektor I klase	Viši policijski inspektor	Samostalni policijski inspektor	Policijski inspektor I klase	Policijski inspektor	Mlađi policijski inspektor
Police of Montenegro	Police director	Deputy police director	Chief police inspector	Senior police inspector I class	Senior police inspector	Independent police inspector	Police inspector I class	Police inspector	Junior police inspector

Other

	Police sergeants			Police officers
Police of Montenegro
Police of Montenegro	Stariji policijski narednik I klase	Stariji policijski narednik	Policijski narednik	Stariji policajac I klase	Stariji policajac	Policajac
Police of Montenegro	Senior police sergeant I class	Senior police sergeant	Police sergeant	Senior police officer I class	Senior police officer	Police officer

== Netherlands ==
National police ranks and rank insignia of the Netherlands
Rank / rank insignia	First Chief Commissioner (Eerste Hoofdcommissaris)	Chief Commissioner (Hoofdcommissaris)	Commissioner (Commissaris)	Chief Inspector (Hoofdinspecteur)	Inspector (Inspecteur)	Sergeant (Brigadier)
Epaulette						
Slide-on						
Rank / rank insignia	Senior Constable (Hoofdagent)	Constable (Agent)	Police Patrol Officer (Surveillant)	Police Trainee (Aspirant)	Employee with limited law enforcement authority (Niet-Executieve Medewerker)	
Epaulette						
Slide-on						

Royal Marechaussee (gendarmerie)

Officers

NATO code	OF-10	OF-9	OF-8	OF-7	OF-6	OF-5	OF-4	OF-3	OF-2	OF-1
Royal Marechaussee
Royal Marechaussee			Luitenant-generaal	Generaal-majoor	Brigade-generaal	Kolonel	Luitenant-kolonel	Majoor	Kapitein	Eerste-luitenant	Tweede-luitenant

NCO/enlisted

NATO code	OR-9	OR-8	OR-7	OR-6	OR-5	OR-4	OR-3	OR-2	OR-1
Royal Marechaussee
Royal Marechaussee	Adjudant-onderofficier		Opperwachtmeester	Wachtmeester der 1e klasse	Wachtmeester	Marechaussee der 1e klasse	Marechaussee der 2e klasse	Marechaussee der 3e klasse	Marechaussee der 4e klasse

== Norway ==
Norwegian Police Service
Insignia							
Rank	Politidirektør	Assisterende politidirektør	Politimester	Visepolitimester	Politiinspektør og Politiadvokat	Politiadvokat	Politifullmektig
English	National police commissioner	Assistant national commissioner	Chief of police	Deputy chief of police	Assistant chief of police	Police prosecutor	Junior police prosecutor
Insignia							
Rank	Politistasjonssjef Lensmann	Politioverbetjent	Politiførstebetjent	Politibetjent 3	Politibetjent 2	Politibetjent 1	Politi reserven
English	Police chief superintendent	Police superintendent	Police chief inspector	Police inspector	Police sergeant	Police constable	Police reserve

== Poland ==
=== Polish State Police ===
Officers

Rank group	General / flag officers		Senior officers			Junior officers
	Generals		Senior officers			Junior officers
Policja
Policja	Generalny inspektor Policji	Nadinspektor	Inspektor	Młodszy inspektor	Podinspektor	Nadkomisarz	Komisarz	Podkomisarz
Policja	Inspector general of police	Chief inspector	Inspector	Junior inspector	Deputy inspector	Chief commissioner	Commissioner	Deputy commissioner

Other

Rank group	Senior NCOs							Junior NCOs	Enlisted
	Aspirants				Non-commissioned officers				Constables
Policja
Policja	Aspirant sztabowy	Starszy aspirant	Aspirant	Młodszy aspirant	Sierżant sztabowy	Starszy sierżant	Sierżant		Starszy posterunkowy	Posterunkowy
Policja	Staff aspirant	Senior aspirant	Aspirant	Junior aspirant	Staff sergeant	Senior sergeant	Sergeant		Senior constable	Constable

== Portugal ==
The public security police (PSP) of Portugal includes the following categories, ranks, insignia and respective main functions:

- Officers
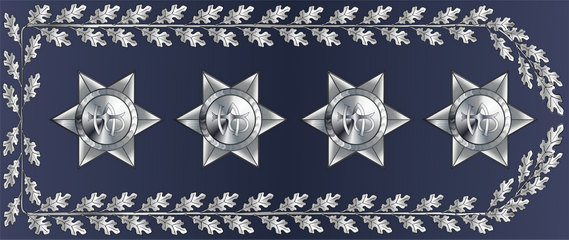
  - Chief superintendent: national director of the PSP,
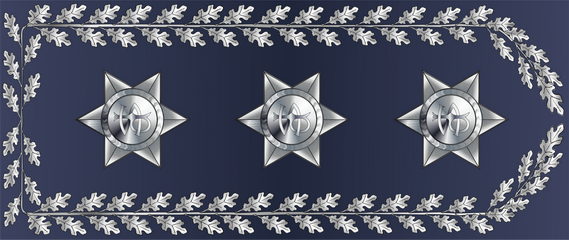
  - Chief superintendent: deputy national director or inspector general of the PSP
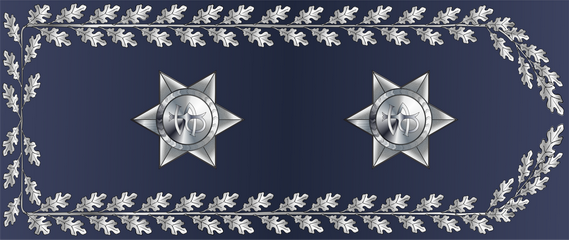
  - Chief superintendent: commanding officer of a metropolitan or regional command
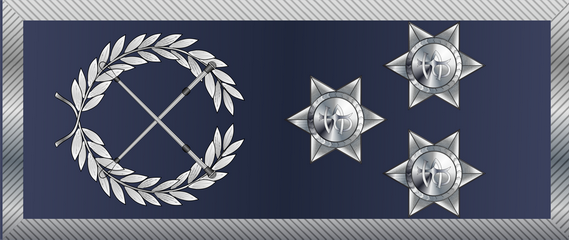
  - Superintendent: commanding officer of a district command or second-in-command of a metropolitan or regional command
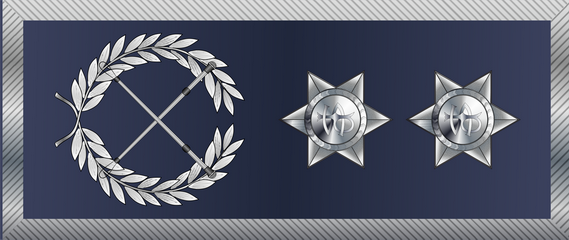
  - Intendent: division commander in a metropolitan or regional command or second-in-command of a district command
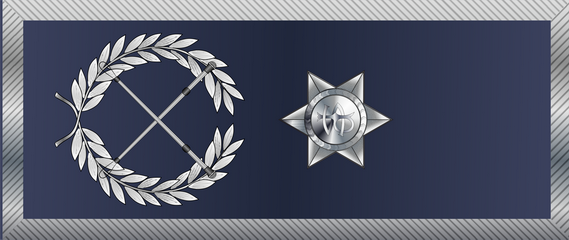
  - Sub-intendent: division commander in a district command or second-in-command of a division commanded by an intendent
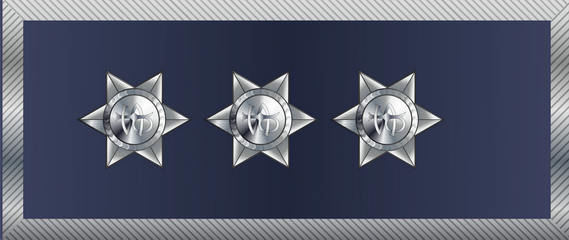
  - Commissioner: second-in-command of a division commanded by a sub-intendent
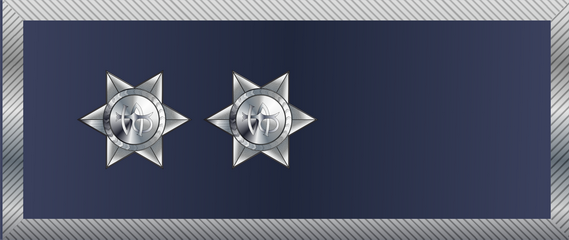
  - Sub-commissioner: commanding officer of a police squad (police station)
- Chiefs
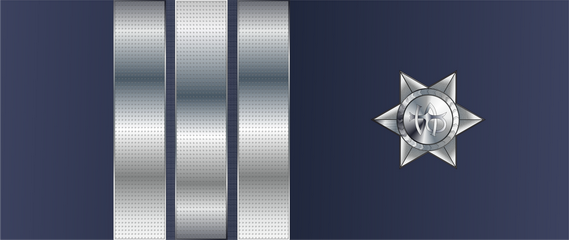
  - Principal chief: auxiliary of a unit commanding officer
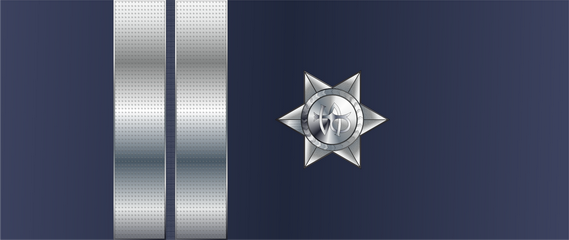
  - Chief: supervisor of staff and leader of police teams
- Agents
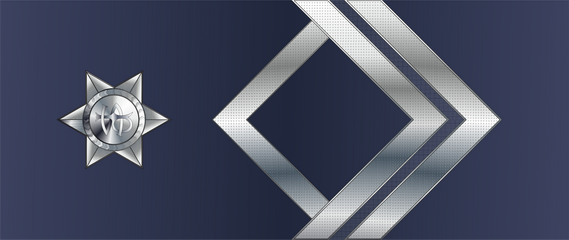
  - Principal agent: a senior principal agent who may perform the same functions as a chief, others perform the same functions as an agent
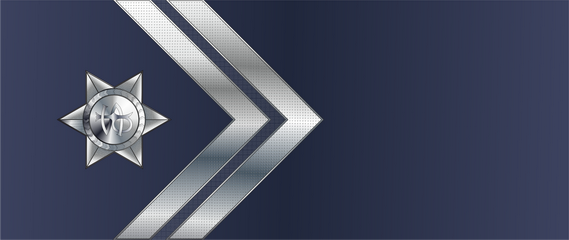
  - Agent: functions of police constable
- ISCPSI students:
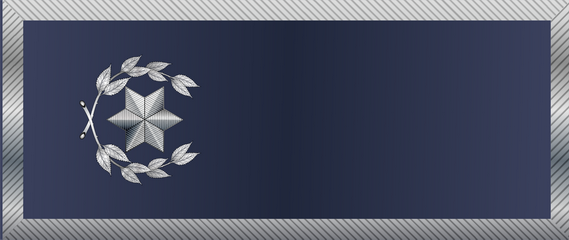
  - Officer candidate: student of the fifth year of the training course for police officers (CFOP)
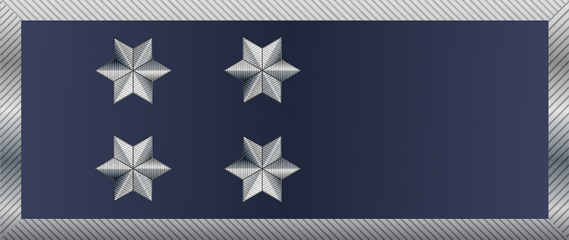
  - Cadet: student of the fourth year of the CFOP
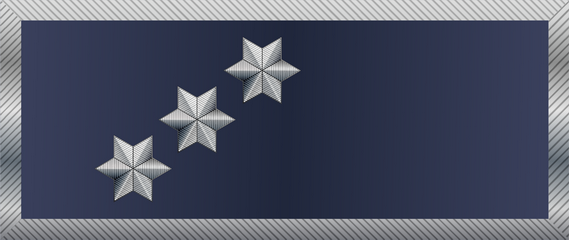
  - Cadet: student of the third year of the CFOP
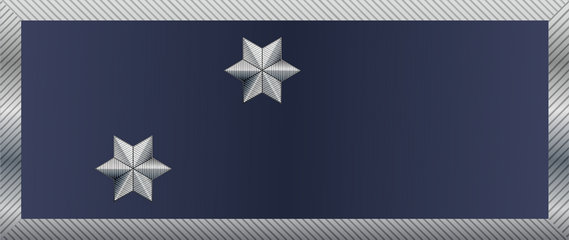
  - Cadet: student of the second year of the CFOP
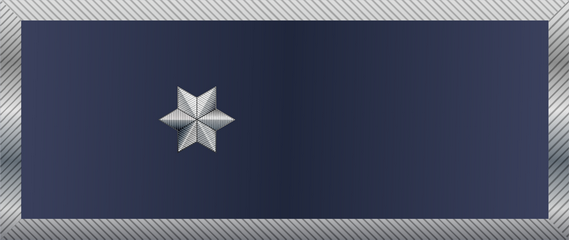
  - Cadet: student of the first year of the CFOP

=== National Republican Guard ===
Officers

NATO code	OF-10	OF-9	OF-8		OF-7	OF-6	OF-5	OF-4	OF-3	OF-2	OF-1
National Republican Guard
National Republican Guard			Tenente-general; Comandante-general	Tenente-general	Major-general		Coronel	Tenente-coronel	Major	Capitão	Tenente	Alferes

NCOs and constables

NATO code	OR-9		OR-8	OR-7	OR-6	OR-5	OR-4		OR-3	OR-2		OR-1
(Portugal) National Republican Guard
(Portugal) National Republican Guard	Sargento-mor	Sargento-chefe	Sargento-ajudante	Primeiro-sargento	Segundo-sargento	Furriel	Cabo-mor	Cabo-chefe	Cabo-de-curso	Cabo	Guarda principal	Guarda

== Romania ==
=== Romanian Police ===
Police officers' corps (Corpul ofiţerilor de poliţie)

Rank group	General / flag officers				Senior officers			Junior officers
Group	Quaestors				Commissioners			Inspectors
(Romania) Romanian Police
(Romania) Romanian Police	Chestor-general; Quaestor-general	Chestor-șef; Chief-quaestor	Chestor-principal; Principal quaestor	Chestor; Quaestor	Comisar-șef; Chief-commissioner	Comisar; Commissioner	Subcomisar; Subcommissioner	Inspector-principal; Principal inspector	Inspector; Inspector	Subinspector; Subinspector

Police agents' corps (Corpul agenţilor de poliţie)

Equivalent NATO code	OR-9		OR-8	OR-7	OR-6
Group	Agents
(Romania) Romanian Police
(Romania) Romanian Police	Agent-şef principal Principal chief agent	Agent-şef; Chief agent	Agent-şef adjunct Deputy chief agent	Agent principal Principal agent	Agent; Agent

=== Romanian Gendarmerie ===
Commissioned officers

NATO code	OF-10	OF-9	OF-8	OF-7	OF-6	OF-5	OF-4	OF-3	OF-2	OF-1
(Romania) Romanian Gendarmerie
(Romania) Romanian Gendarmerie	Mareșal	General	General-locotenent	General-maior	General de brigadă	Colonel	Locotenent-colonel	Maior	Căpitan	Locotenent	Sublocotenent

Other ranks

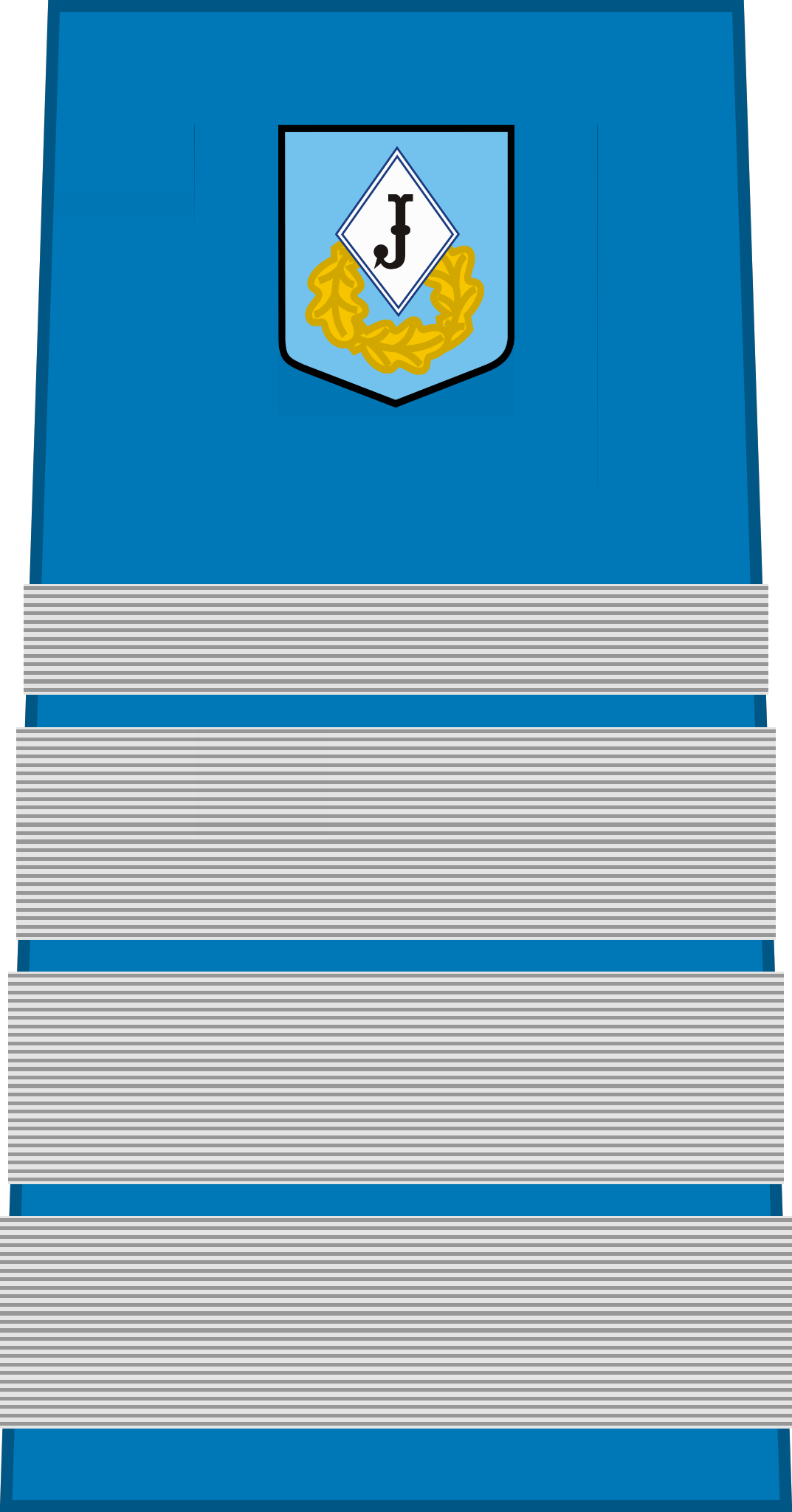
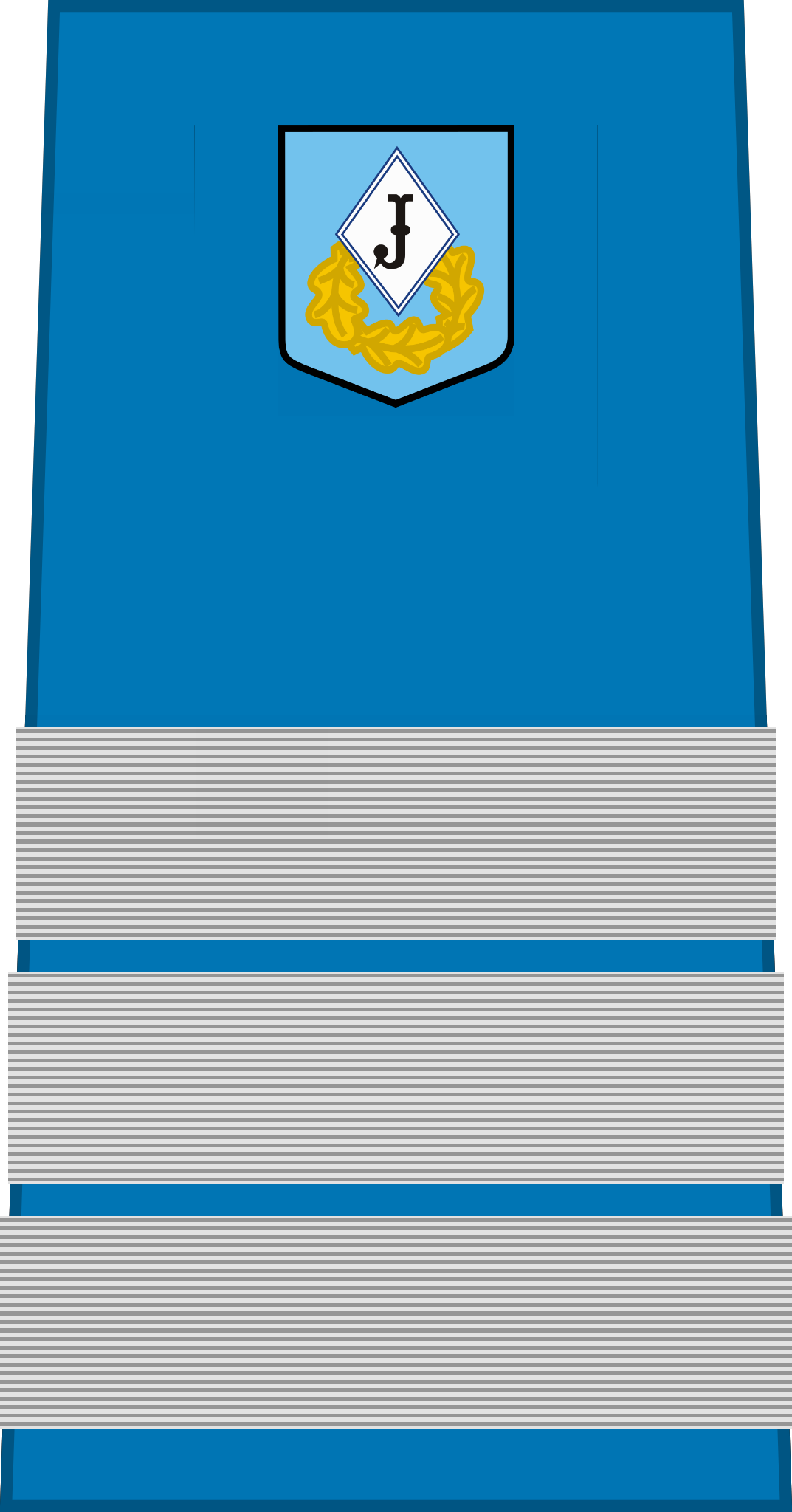
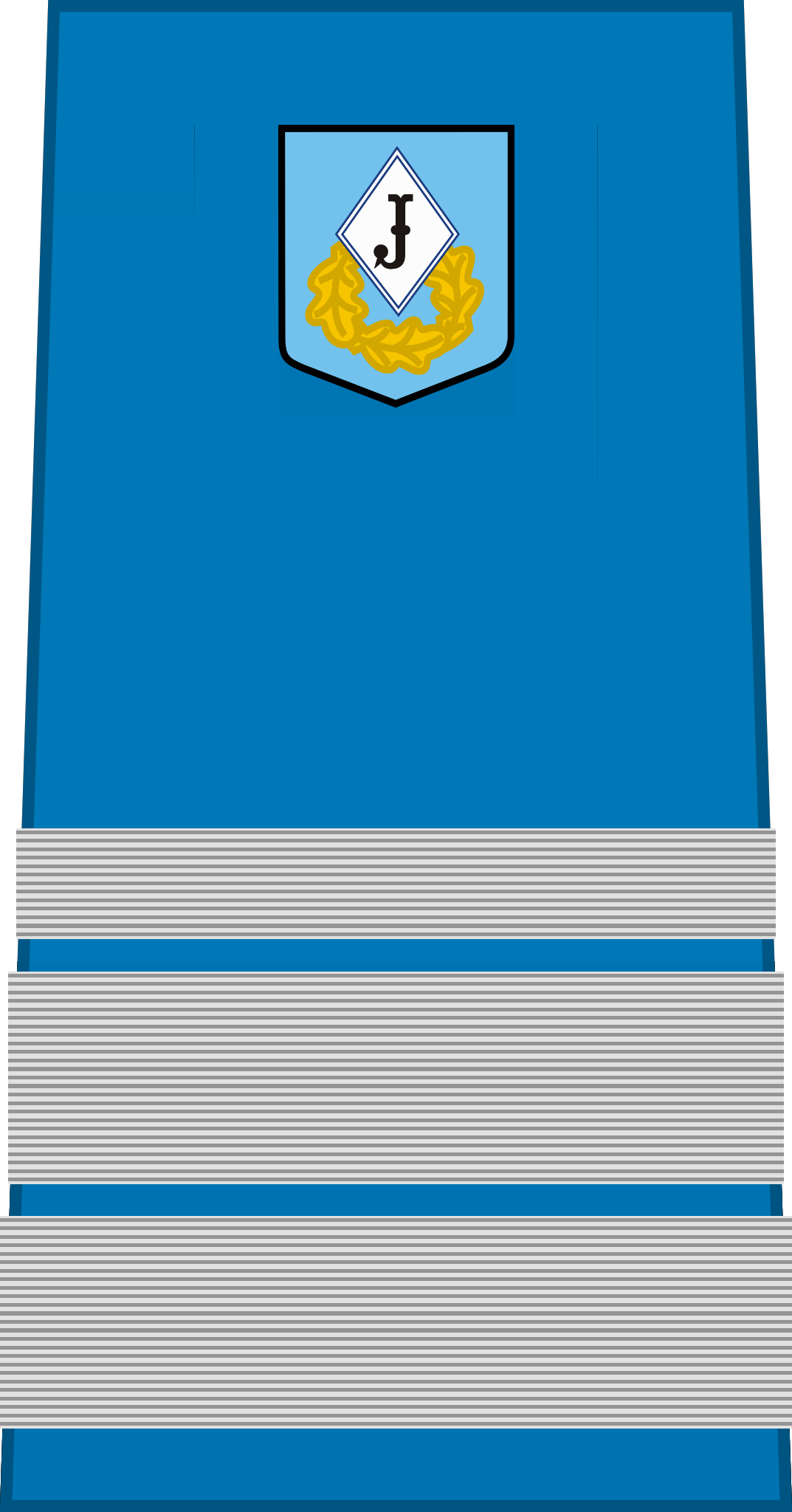
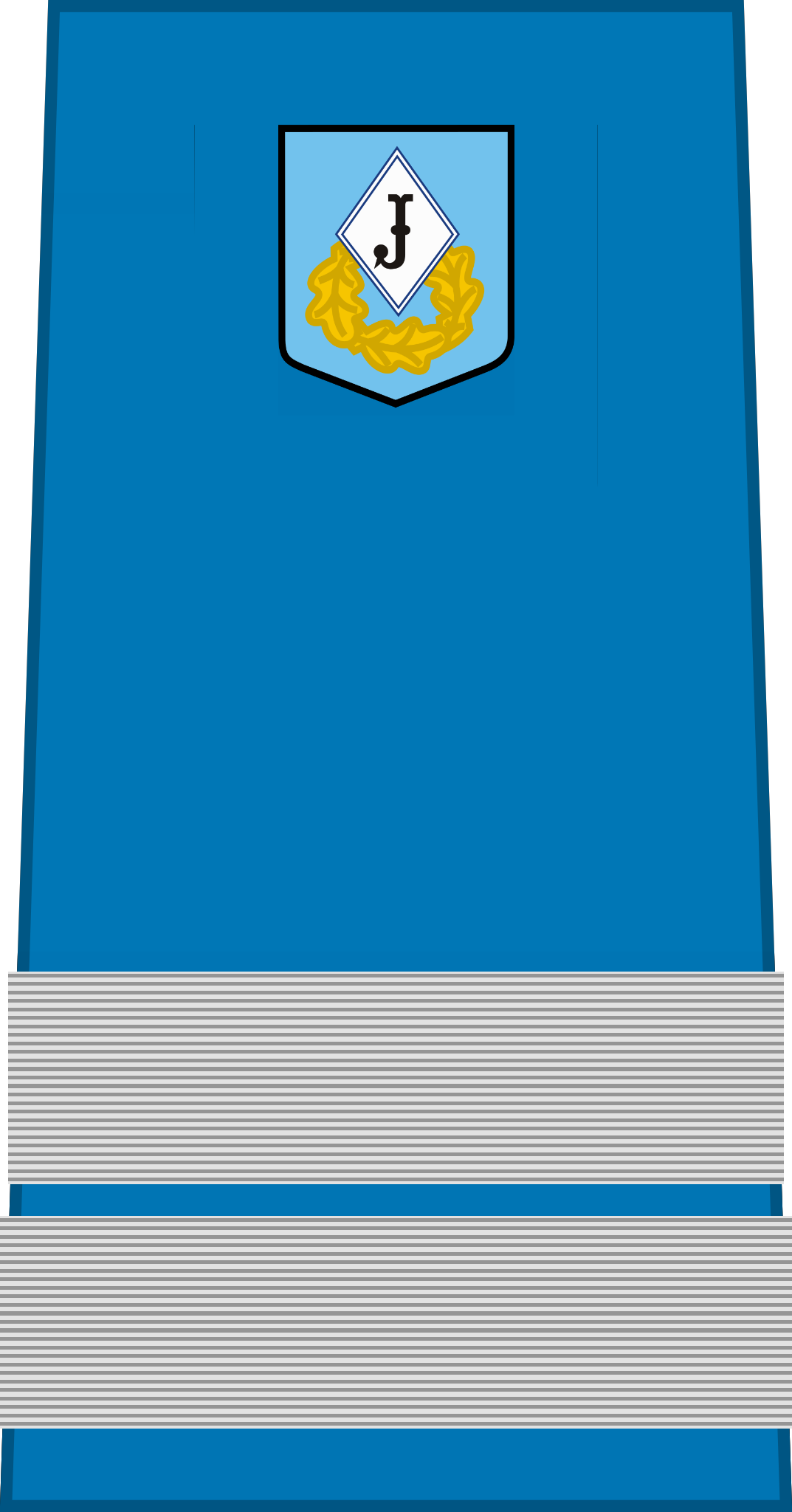
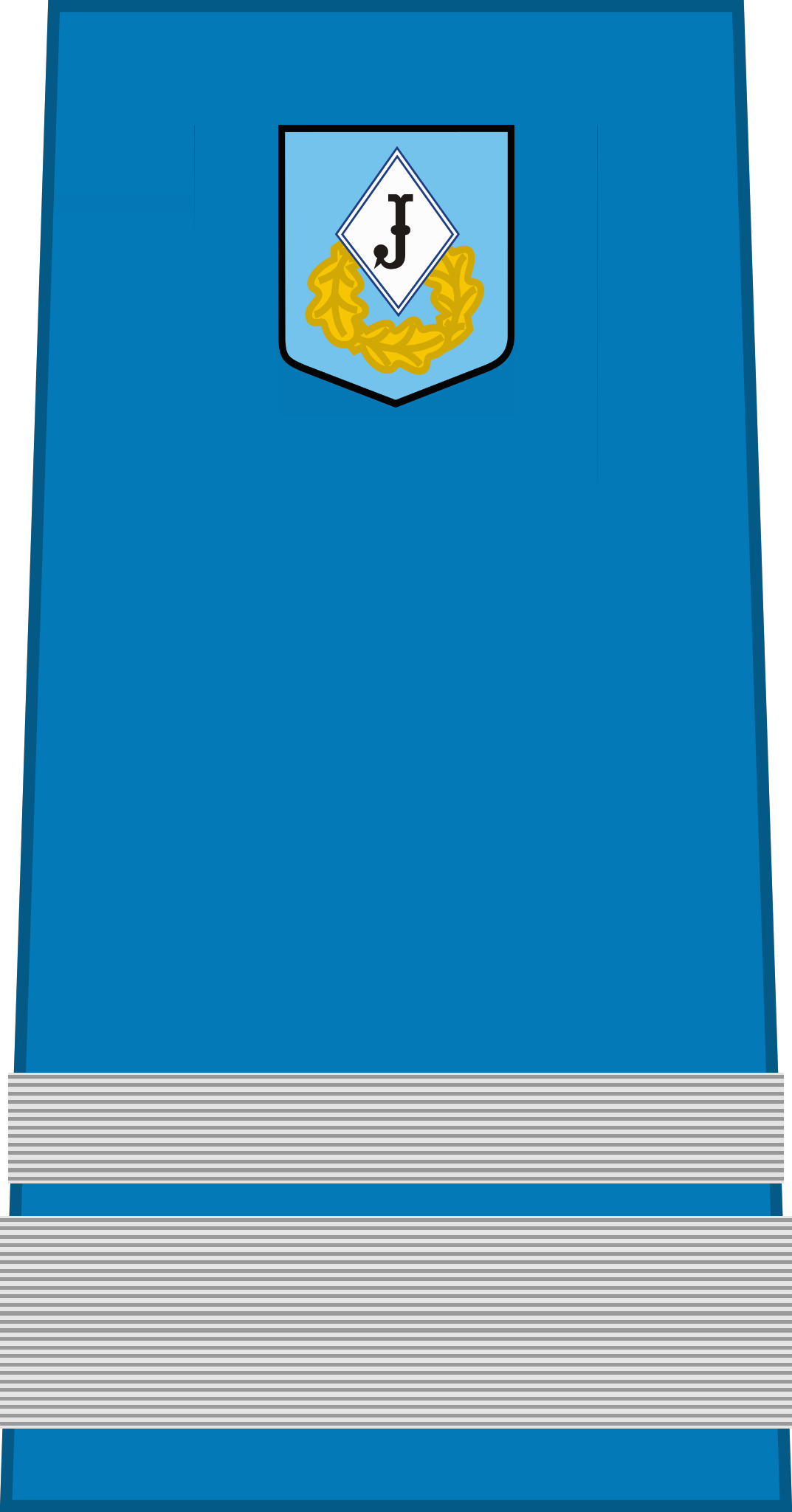
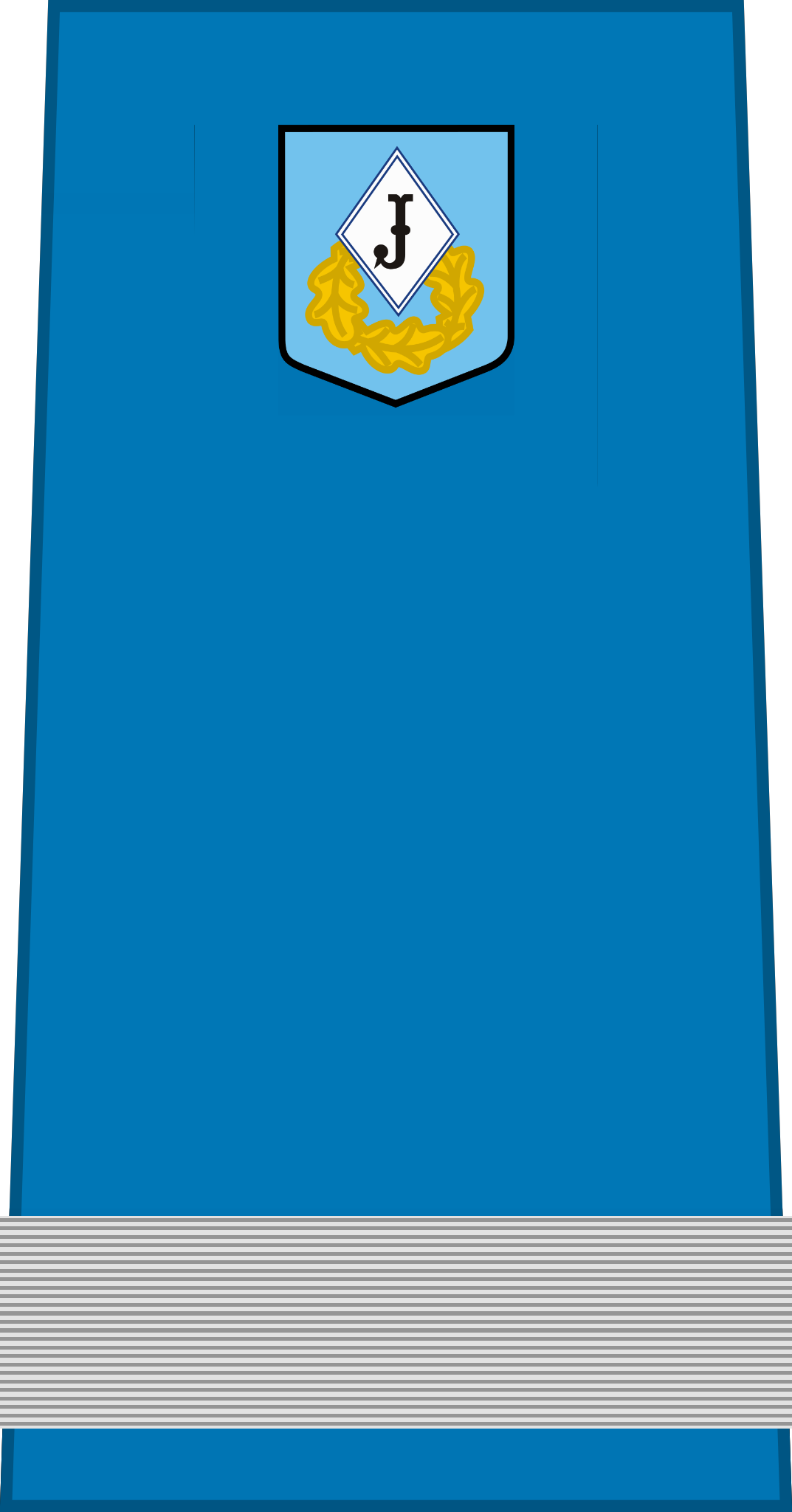
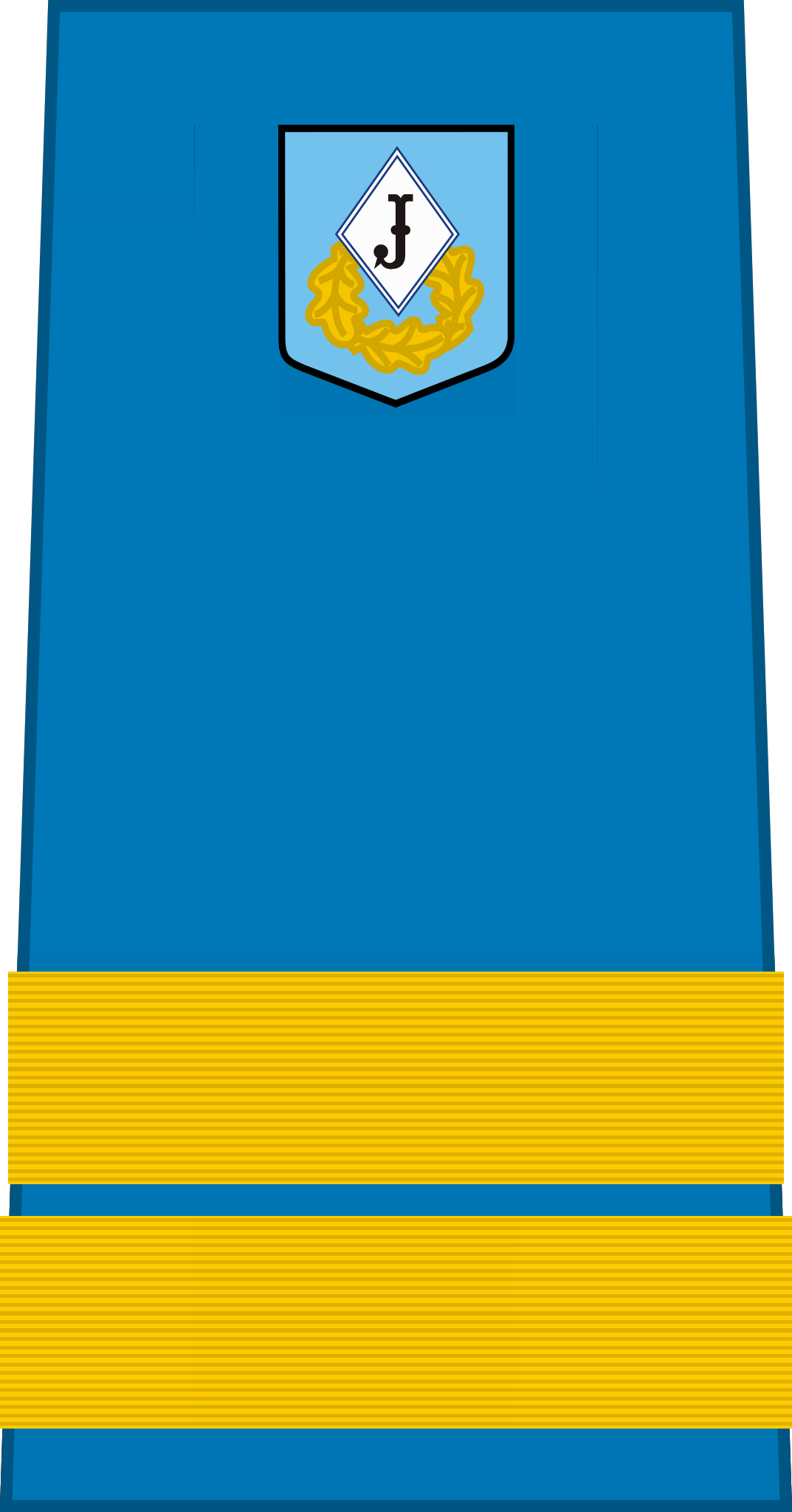
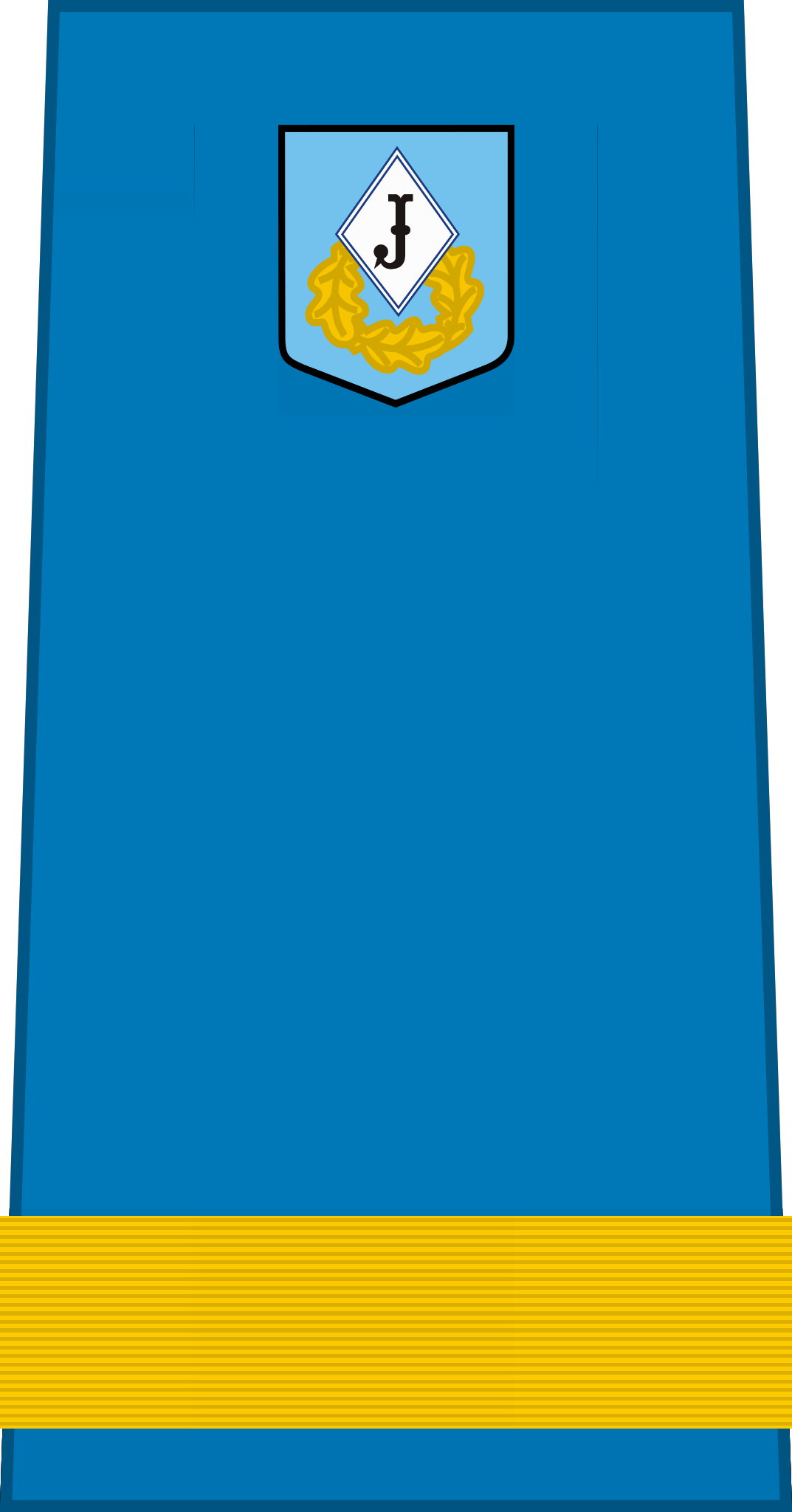
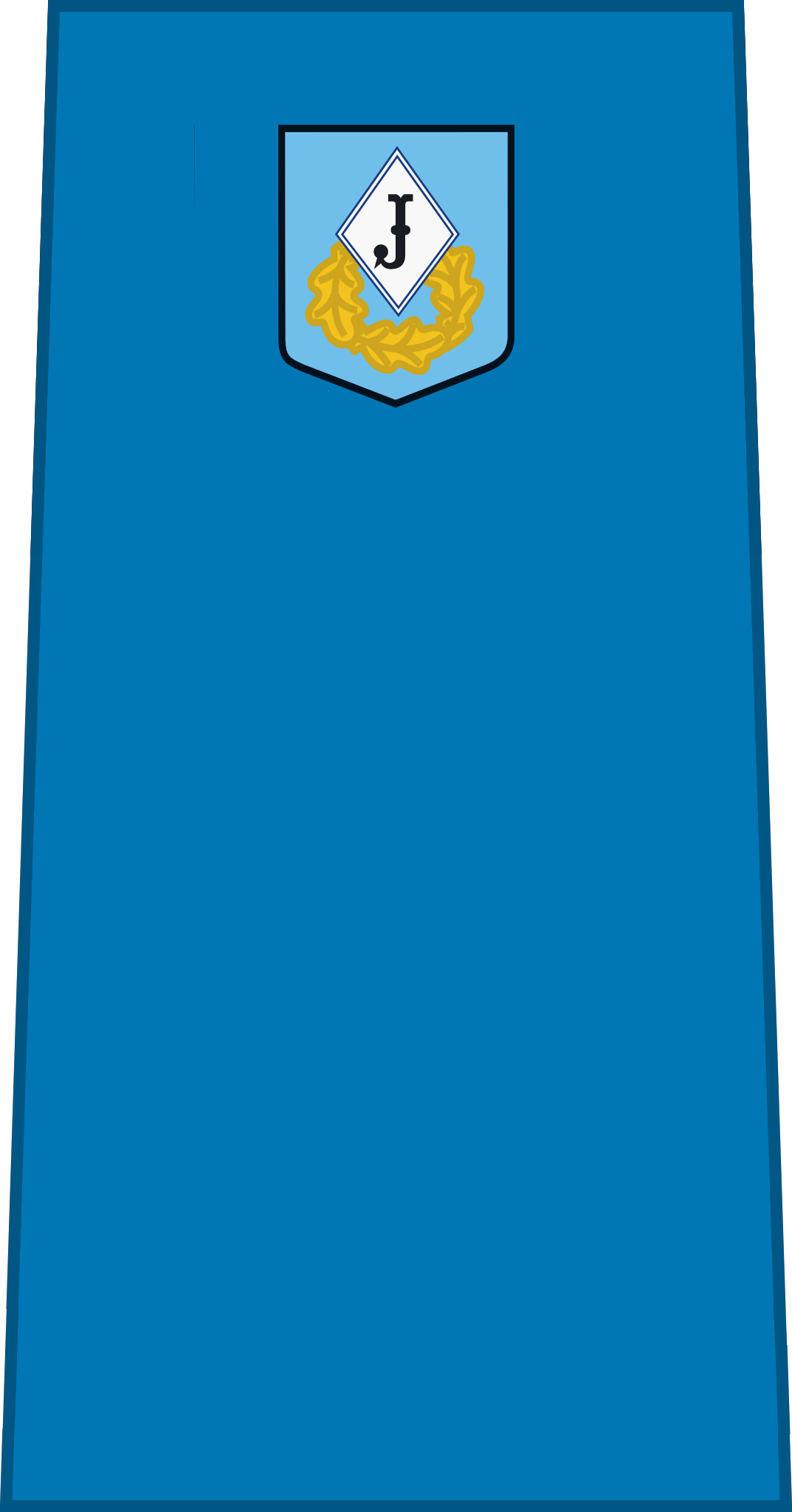
NATO code	OR-9		OR-8	OR-7	OR-6	OR-5	OR-4	OR-3	OR-2	OR-1
(Romania) Romanian Gendarmerie
(Romania) Romanian Gendarmerie	Plutonier adjutant șef	Plutonier adjutant	Plutonier-major	Plutonier	Sergent-major	Sergent	Caporal	Fruntaș	Jandarm

== Russia ==
=== Police of Russia ===
Officers

Rank group	General / flag officers				Senior officers			Junior officers
Police of Russia
Police of Russia	Генерал полиции Российской Федерации; General politsii Rossiyskoy Federatsii	Генерал-полковник полиции Generál-polkóvnik politsii	Генера́л-лейтена́нт полиции Generál-leytenánt politsii	Генера́л-майо́р полиции Generál-mayór politsii	Полко́вник полиции Polkóvnik politsii	Подполко́вник полиции Podpolkóvnik politsii	Майо́р полиции Majór politsii	Kапита́н полиции Kapitán politsii	Старший лейтена́нт полиции Stárshiy leytenánt politsii	Лейтенант полиции Leytenant politsii	Mла́дший лейтена́нт полиции Mládshiy leytenánt politsii	Курсант полиции Kursant politsii

Other ranks

Rank group	Senior NCOs						Junior NCOs	Enlisted
Police of Russia
Police of Russia	Старший прапорщик полиции Starshiy praporshchik politsii	Прапорщик полиции Praporshchik politsii	Старшина полиции Starshina politsii	Старший сержант полиции Starshiy serzhant politsii	Сержант полиции Serzhant politsii	Младший сержант полиции Mladshiy serzhant politsii		Рядовой полиции Ryadovoy politsii

=== Main Directorate for Criminal Investigation of the Ministry of the Interior ===
Ministry of Interior criminal investigators have jurisdiction over cases concerning harm to health, crimes against property, economic crimes, drug trafficking, banditry and other such cases.

Officers

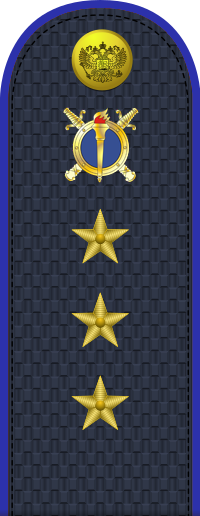
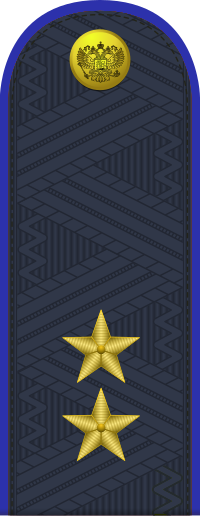
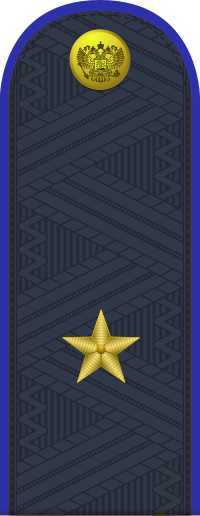
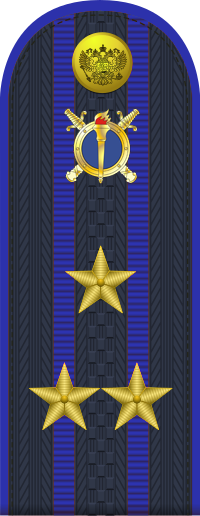
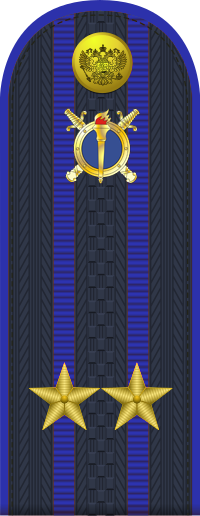
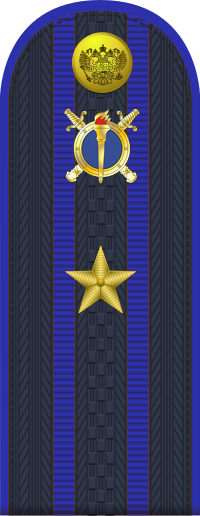
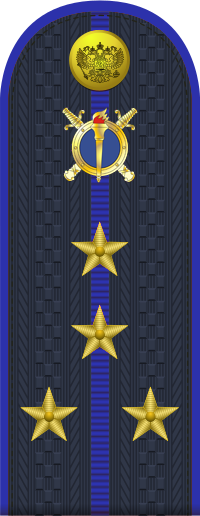
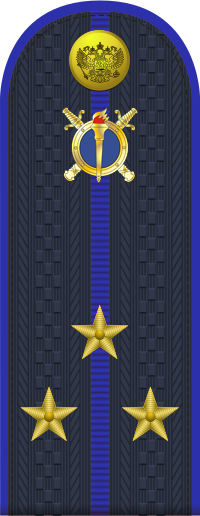
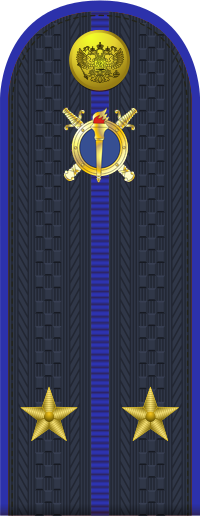
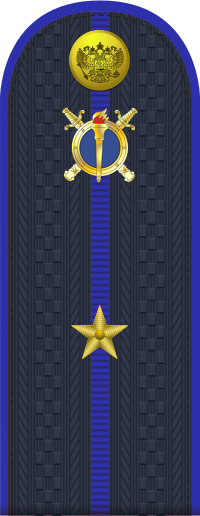
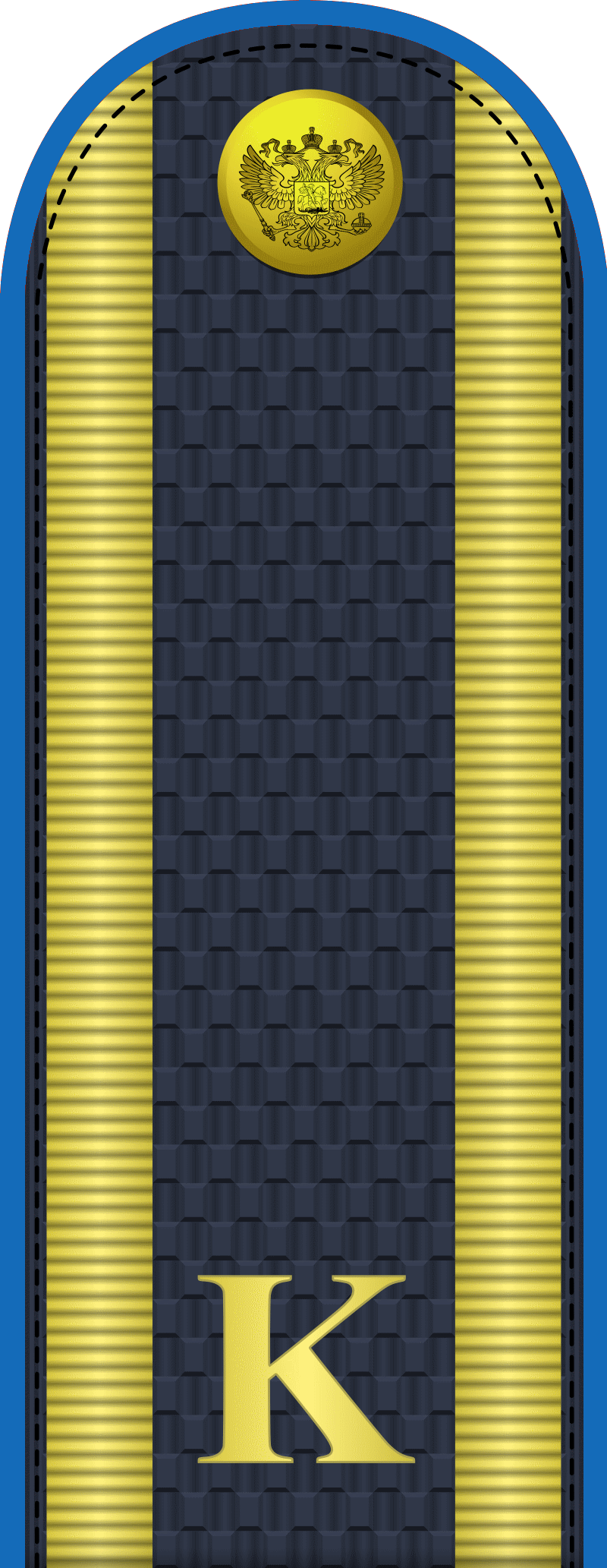
Rank group	General / flag officers			Senior officers			Junior officers
	Supreme command staff			Senior command staff			Medium command staff
Ministry of the Interior
Ministry of the Interior	Colonel general of justice (Генера́л-полко́вник)	Lieutenant general of justice (Генера́л-лейтена́нт)	Major general of justice (Генера́л-майо́р)	Colonel of justice (Полко́вник)	Lieutenant colonel of justice (Подполко́вник)	Major of justice (Майо́р)	Captain of justice (Капита́н)	Senior lieutenant of justice (Старший лейтенант)	Lieutenant of justice (Лейтенант)	Junior lieutenant of justice (Младший лейтенант)	Justice cadet (Курсант юстиции)

Enlisted

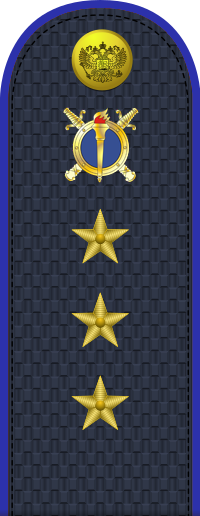
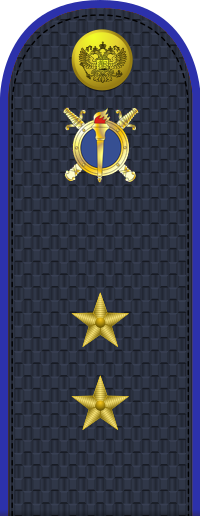
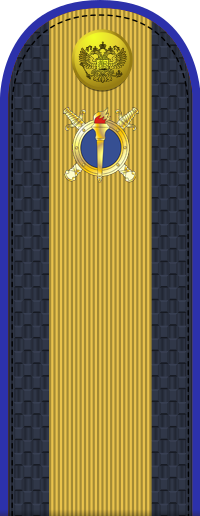
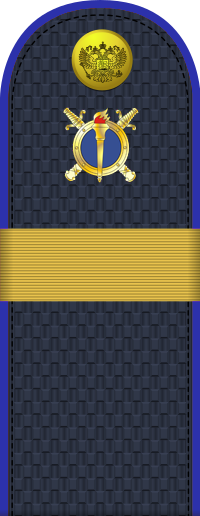
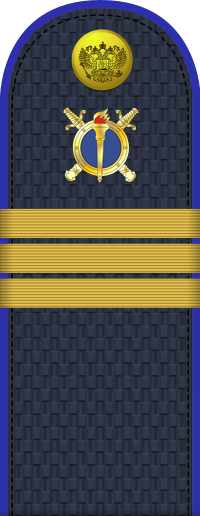
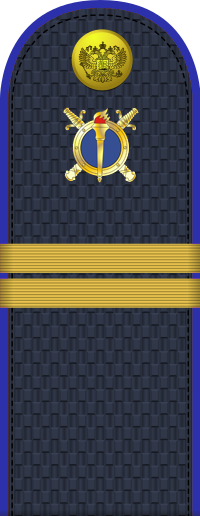
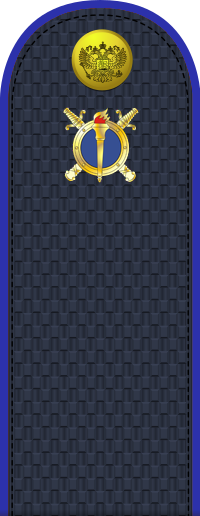
Rank group	Senior NCOs						Junior NCOs	Enlisted
	Junior supervising staff							Private staff
Ministry of the Interior
Ministry of the Interior	Starshy praporshchik of justice	Praporshchik of justice (Прапорщик)	Starshina of justice (Старшина)	Senior sergeant of justice	Sergeant of justice (Сержант)	Junior sergeant of justice (Младший сержант)		Private of justice (Рядовой)

=== Investigative Committee of Russia ===
The Investigative Committee of Russia has jurisdiction over cases concerning murder, rape, kidnapping, encroachment on the life of a law enforcement officer and other such cases.

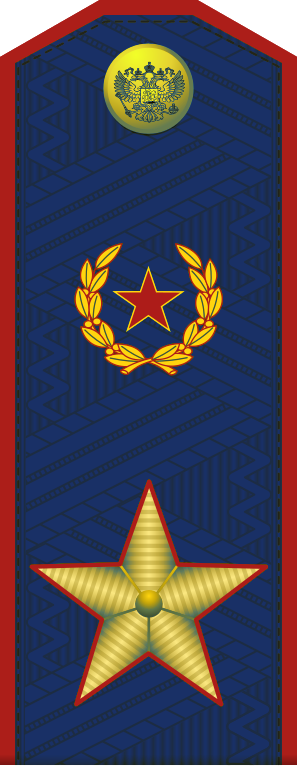
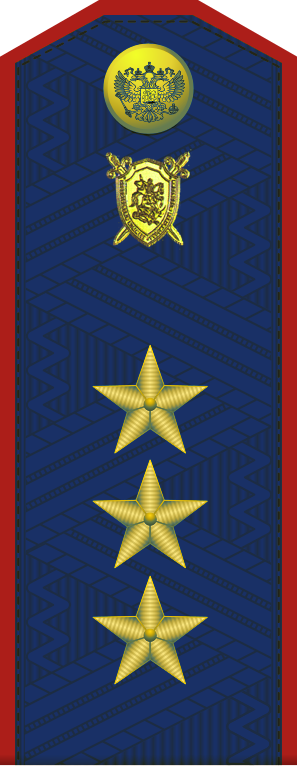
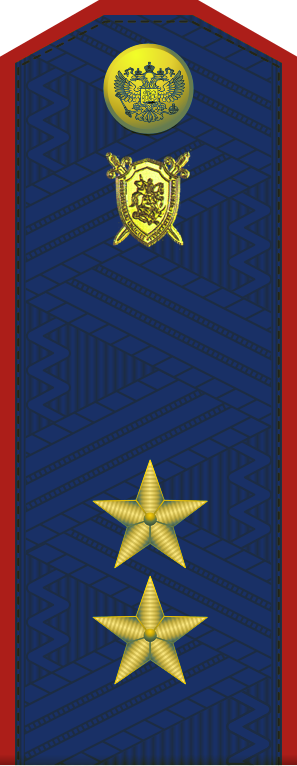
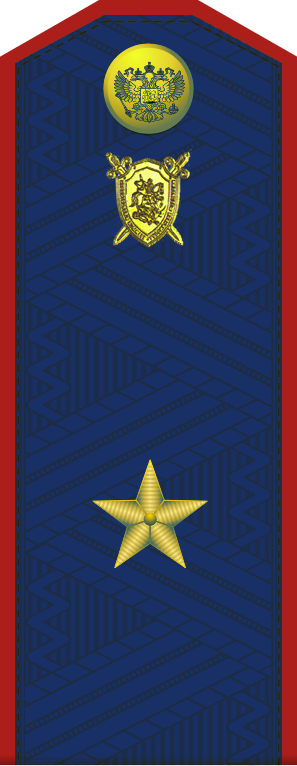
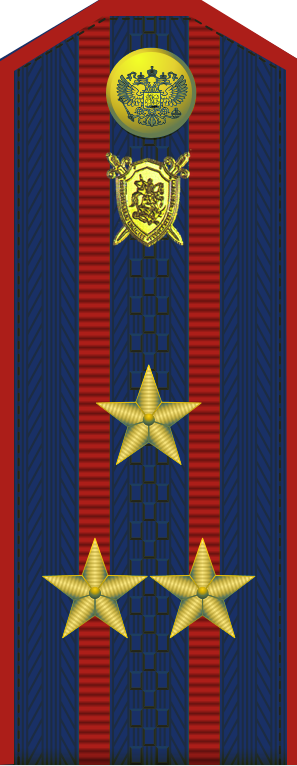
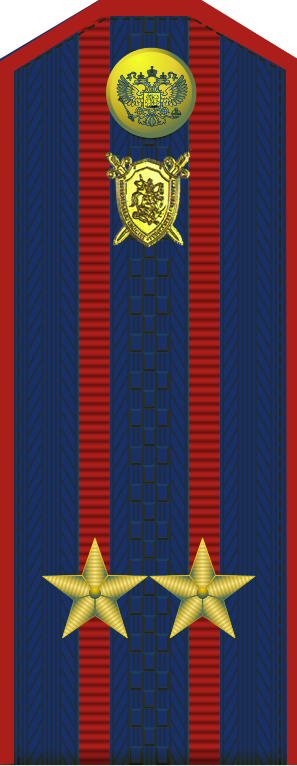
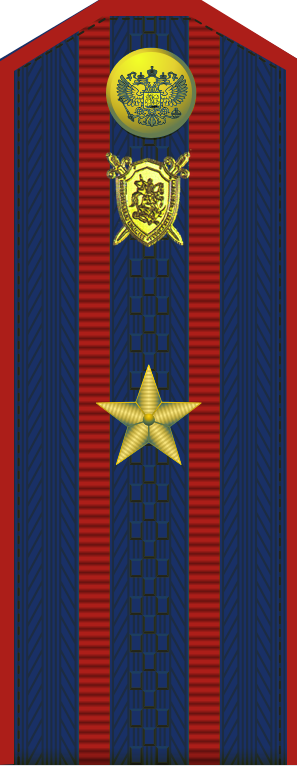
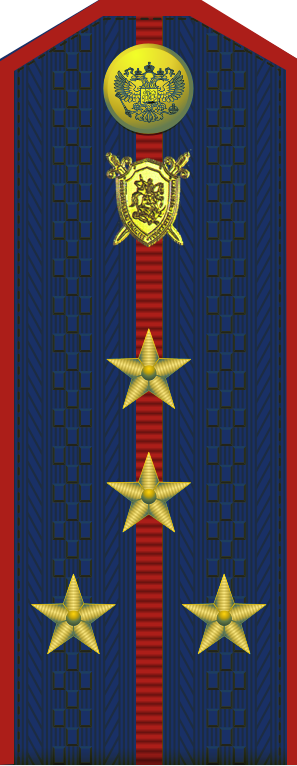
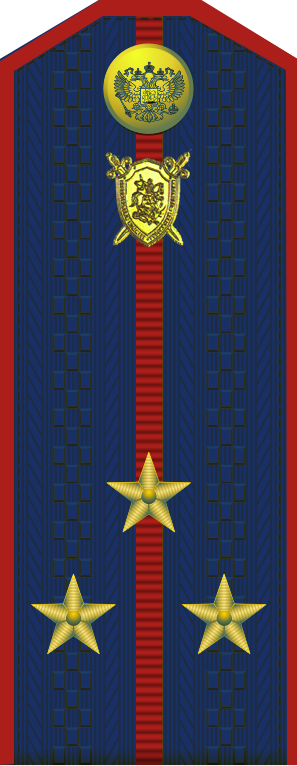
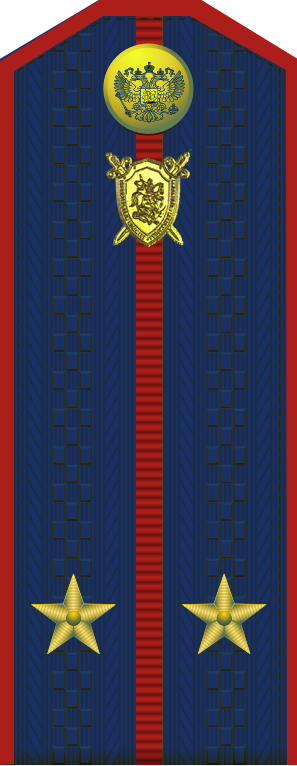
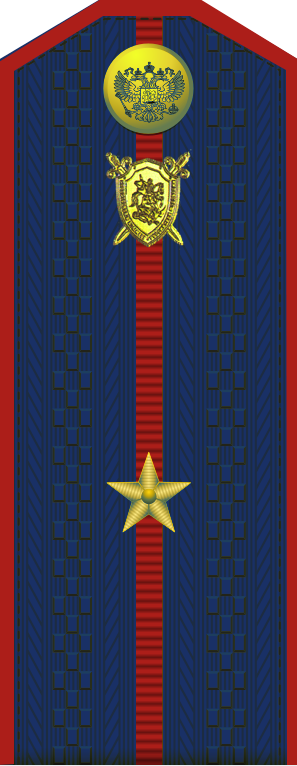
Rank group	General / flag officers				Senior officers			Junior officers
	Higher special grades				Senior special grades			Medium special grades
Investigative committee
Investigative committee	General of justice (Генерал юстиции Российской Федерации)	Colonel general of justice (Генера́л-полко́вник)	Lieutenant general of justice (Генера́л-лейтена́нт)	Major general of justice (Генера́л-майо́р)	Colonel of justice (Полко́вник)	Lieutenant colonel of justice (Подполко́вник)	Major of justice (Майо́р)	Captain of justice (Капита́н)	Senior lieutenant of justice (Старший лейтенант)	Lieutenant of justice (Лейтенант)	Junior lieutenant of justice (Младший лейтенант)

=== Federal Security Service ===
The Federal Security Service has jurisdiction over cases of treason, espionage, terrorism, hostage-taking and other crimes against national security.

Officers

Rank group	General / flag officers				Senior officers			Junior officers
	Supreme command staff				Senior command staff			Medium command staff
Federal Security Service
Federal Security Service	Army General (Генера́л а́рмии)	Colonel general (Генера́л-полко́вник)	Lieutenant general (Генера́л-лейтена́нт)	Major general (Генера́л-майо́р)	Colonel (Полко́вник)	Lieutenant colonel (Подполко́вник)	Major (Майо́р)	Captain (Капита́н)	Senior lieutenant (Старший лейтенант)	Lieutenant (Лейтенант)	Junior lieutenant (Младший лейтенант)	Cadet (Курсант)

Enlisted

Rank group	Senior NCOs						Junior NCOs	Enlisted
	Junior supervising staff							Private staff
Federal Security Service
Federal Security Service	Starshy praporshchik	Praporshchik (Прапорщик)	Starshina (Старшина)	Senior sergeant	Sergeant (Сержант)	Junior sergeant (Младший сержант)	Gefreiter (Ефре́йтор)	Private (Рядовой)

== San Marino ==
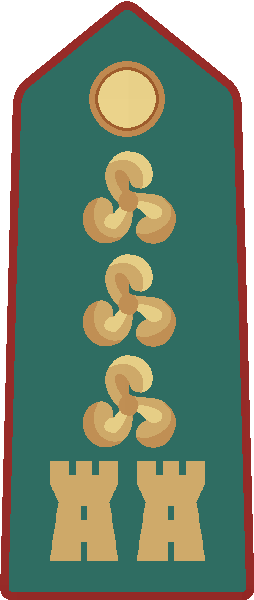
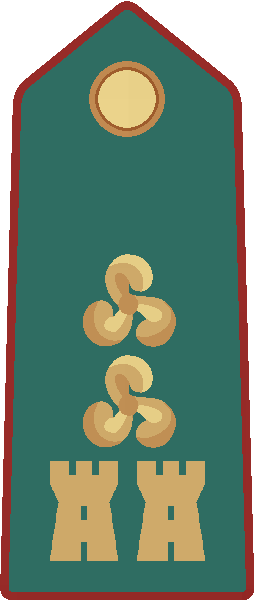
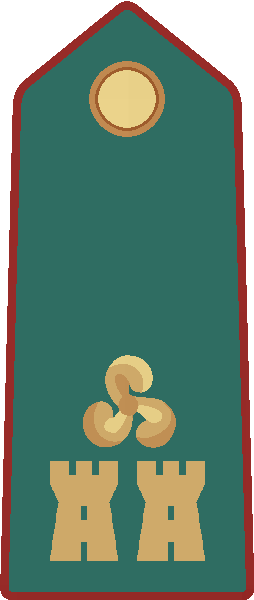
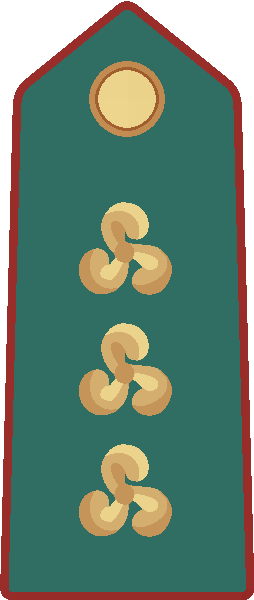
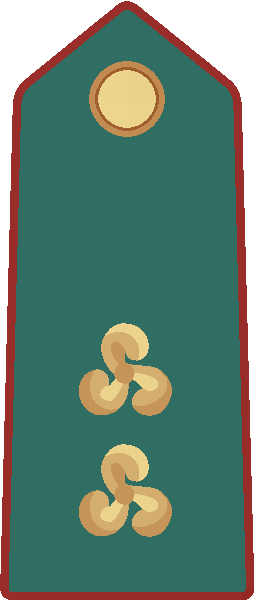
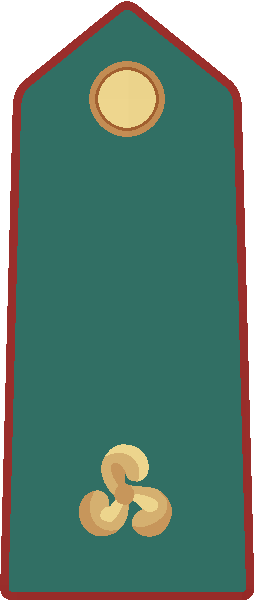
Rank group	General / flag officers	Senior officers			Junior officers
Corps of Gendarmerie of San Marino
Corps of Gendarmerie of San Marino	Generale Brigata	Colonnello	Tenente Colonnello	Maggiore	Capitano	Tenente	Sottotenente
Sammarinese Guard of the Rock
Sammarinese Guard of the Rock		Colonnello	Tenente Colonnello	Maggiore	Capitano	Tenente	Sottotenente

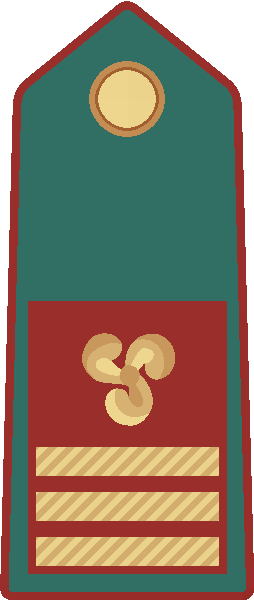
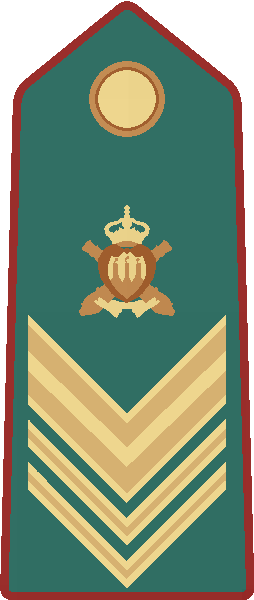
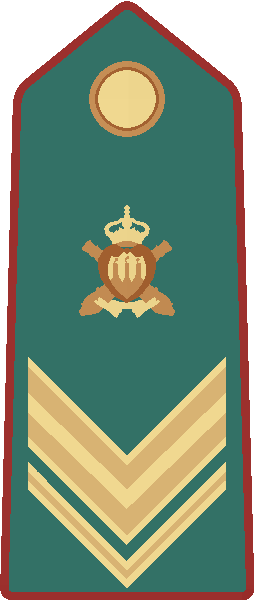
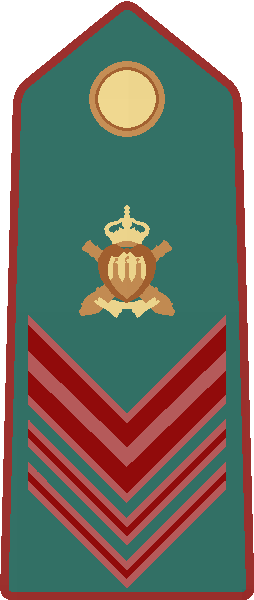
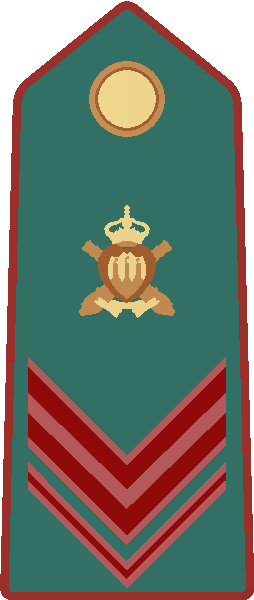
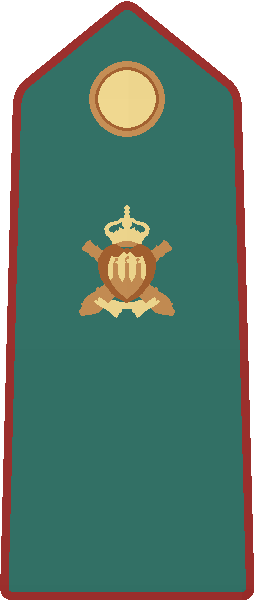
Rank group	Senior NCOs			Junior NCOs	Enlisted
Corps of Gendarmerie of San Marino
Corps of Gendarmerie of San Marino	Maresciallo	Brigadiere	Vice-brigadiere	Appuntato		Gendarme
Sammarinese Guard of the Rock
Sammarinese Guard of the Rock	Sergente Maggiore aiutante	Sergente maggiore	Sergente	Caporale maggiore	Caporale	Guardia Milite

== Serbia ==
Генерал полиције	Пуковник полиције	Потпуковник полиције	Мајор полиције	Капетан полиције	Поручник полиције	Потпоручник полиције	Заставник полиције I класе	Заставник полиције	Водник полиције I класе	Водник полиције	Млађи водник полиције
General policije	Pukovnik policije	Potpukovnik policije	Major policije	Kapetan policije	Poručnik policije	Potporučnik policije	Zastavnik policije I klase	Zastavnik policije	Vodnik policije I klase	Vodnik policije	Mlađi vodnik policije

== Slovenia ==
=== General –, and senior officers ===
Slovenian National Police Force	Director general of police	Deputy director general of police	Police superintendent I	Police superintendent II	Police superintendent III	Police superintendent IV	Police inspector I	Police inspector II	Police inspector III	Police inspector IV
Slovenian National Police Force	Generalni direktor policije	Namestnik generalnega direktorja policije	Policijski svetnik I	Policijski svetnik II	Policijski svetnik III	Policijski svetnik IV	Policijski inšpektor I	Policijski inšpektor II	Policijski inšpektor III	Policijski inšpektor IV
NATO code equivalent	OF-7	OF-6	OF-5a	OF-5b	OF-4	OF-3	OF-2	OF-1a	OF-1b	OF-1c

=== Junior officers ===
Slovenian National Police Force	Police officer I	Police officer II	Police officer III	Police officer IV	Candidate police officer	Assistant police officer
Slovenian National Police Force	Policist I	Policist II	Policist III	Policist IV	Kandidat za policista	Pomožnik policista
NATO code equivalent	OR-8	RF-7	OR-6	OR-5	OR-2	OR-1

== Spain ==
Cuerpo Nacional de Policía

	Superior grades				Superior		Executive		Deputy inspector	Basic		Student
Spanish National Police Corps
Spanish National Police Corps	Director adjunto operativo	Subdirector general	Comisario general/ jefe de división	Jefe superior	Comisario principal	Comisario	Inspector jefe	Inspector	Subinspector	Oficial de policía	Policía	Inspector alumno en prácticas	Inspector alumno de 2º año	Inspector alumno de 1º año	Policía en prácticas	Policía alumno

Guardia civil – Civil guard

NATO code	OF-10	OF-9	OF-8	OF-7	OF-6	OF-5	OF-4	OF-3	OF-2	OF-1
(Spain) Spanish Civil Guard
(Spain) Spanish Civil Guard			Teniente general	General de división	General de brigada	Coronel	Teniente coronel	Comandante	Capitán	Teniente	Alférez

NATO code	OR-9		OR-8	OR-7	OR-6	OR-5	OR-4	OR-3	OR-2	OR-1
(Spain) Spanish Civil Guard
(Spain) Spanish Civil Guard	Suboficial mayor	Subteniente	Brigada	Sargento primero	Sargento	Cabo mayor	Cabo primero	Cabo	Guardia Civil de Primera (Note: Rank in abeyance)	Guardia Civil

== Sweden ==
=== Chief and senior officers ===
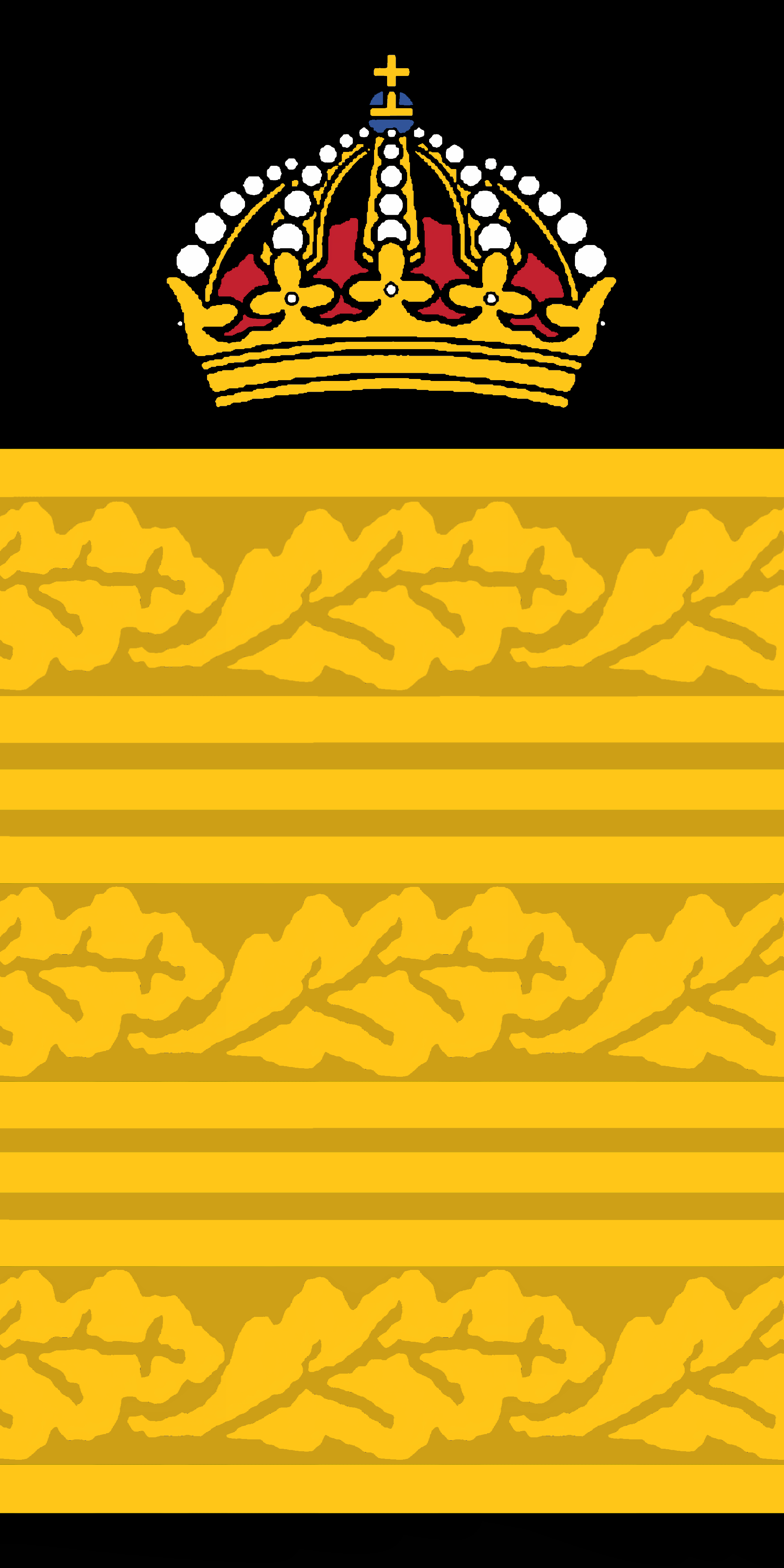
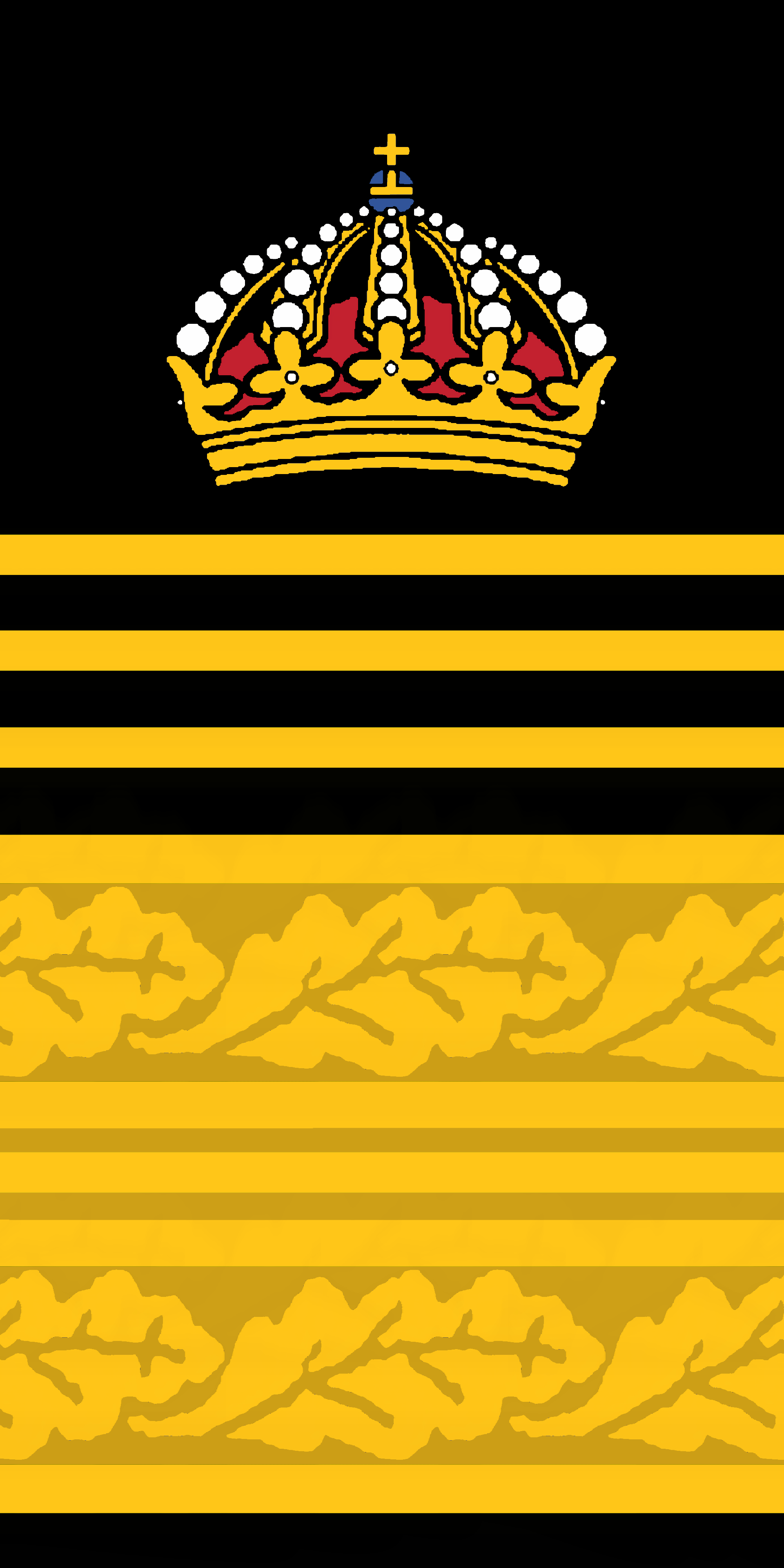
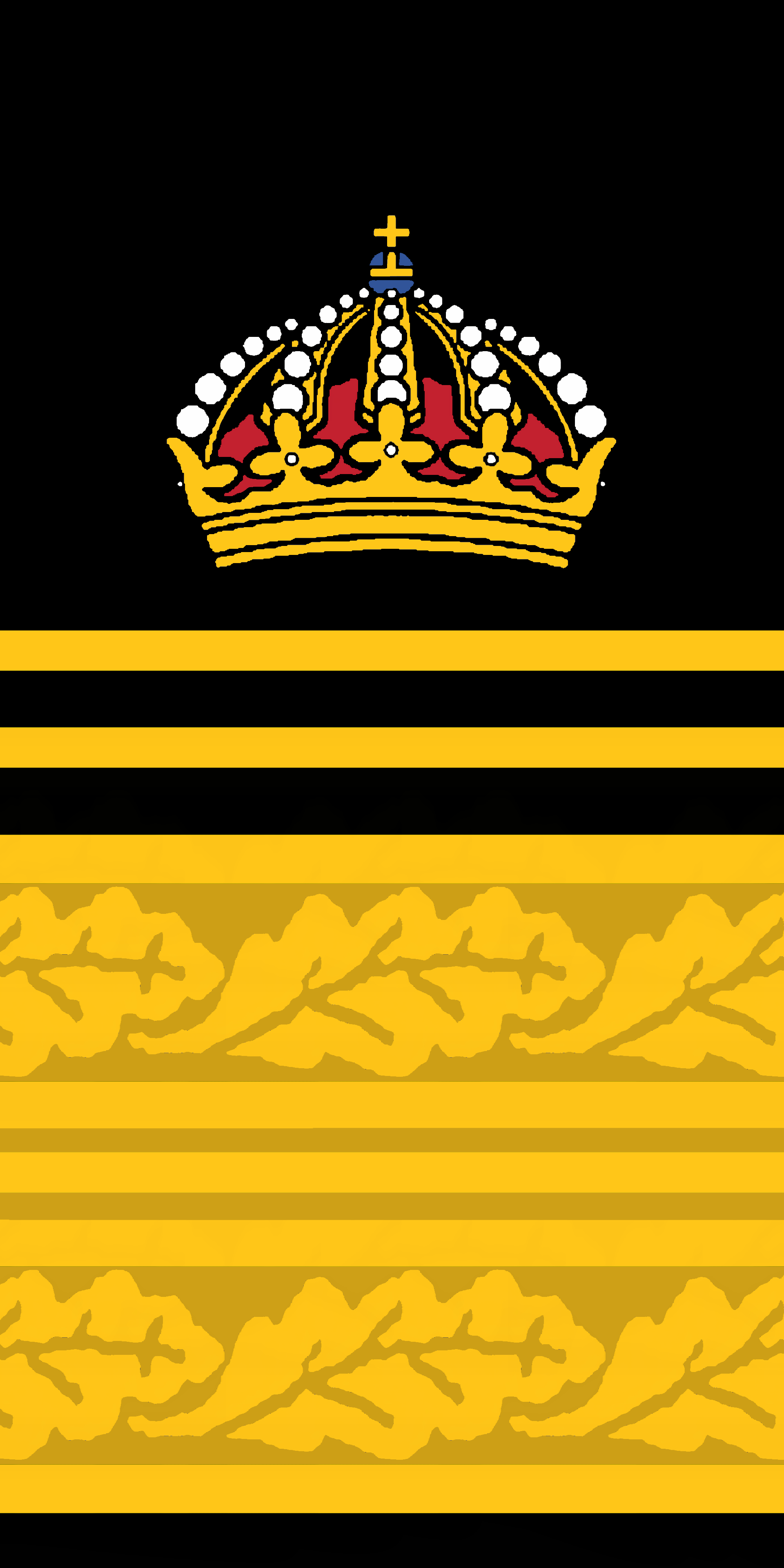
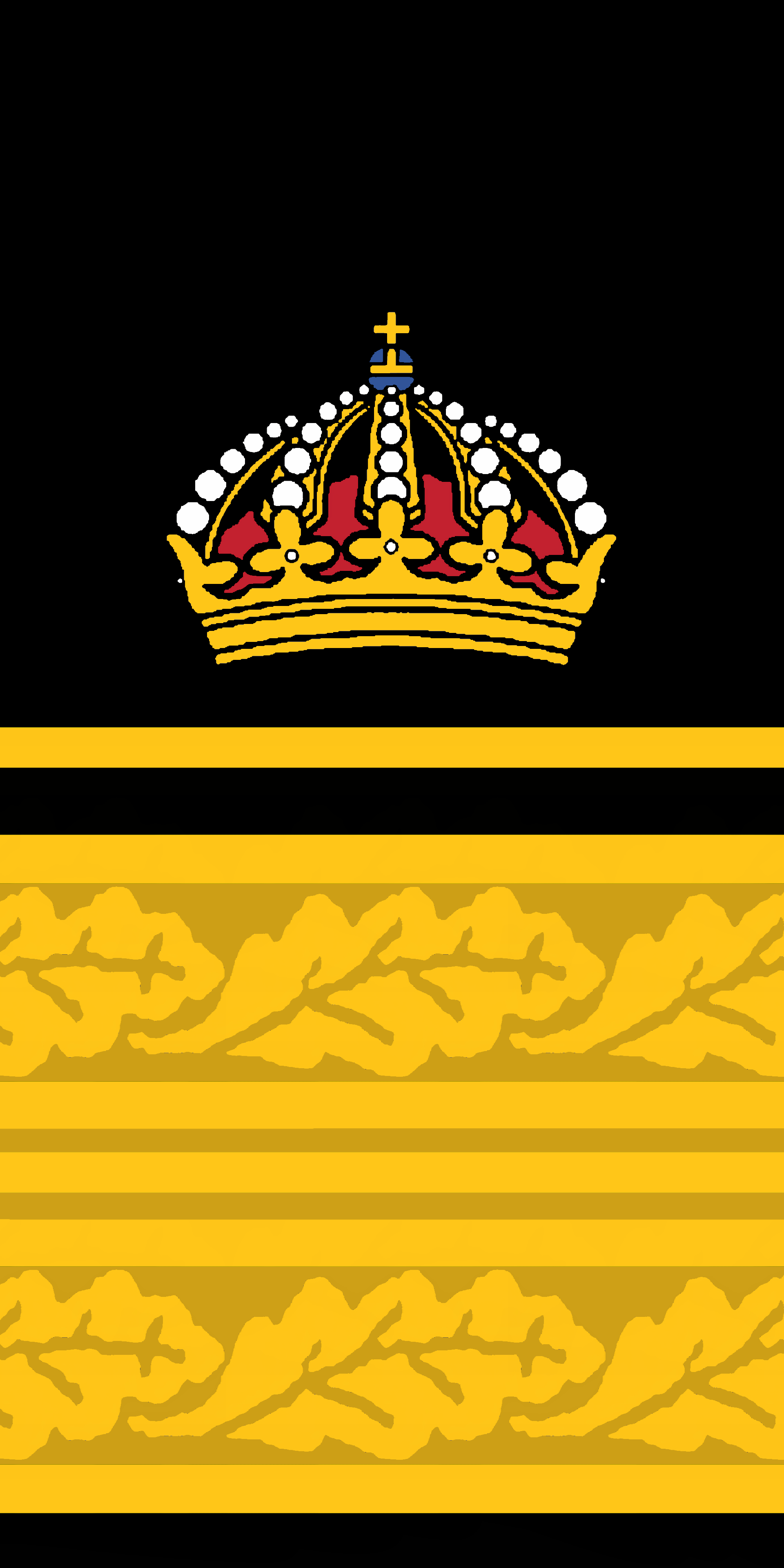
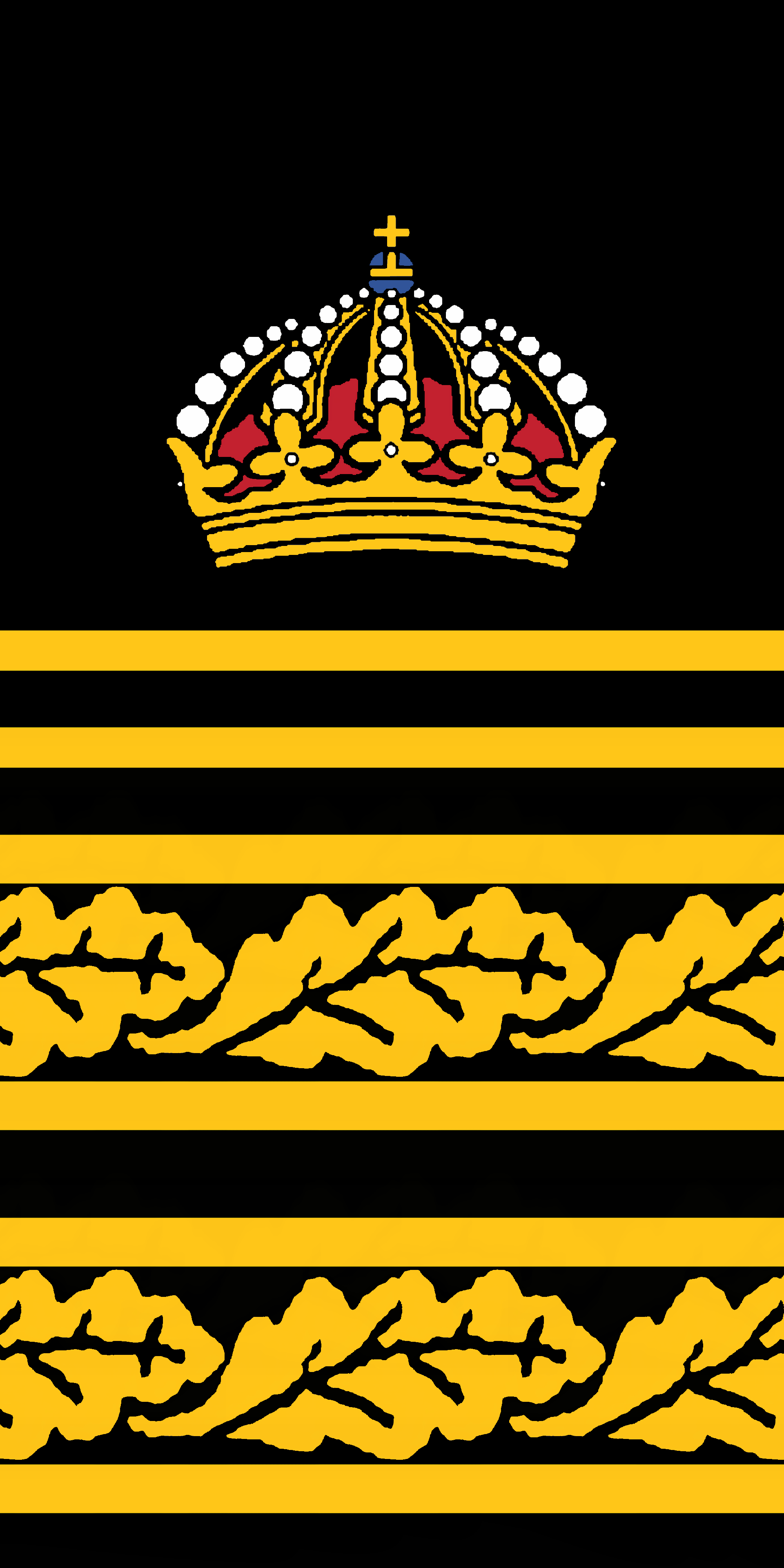
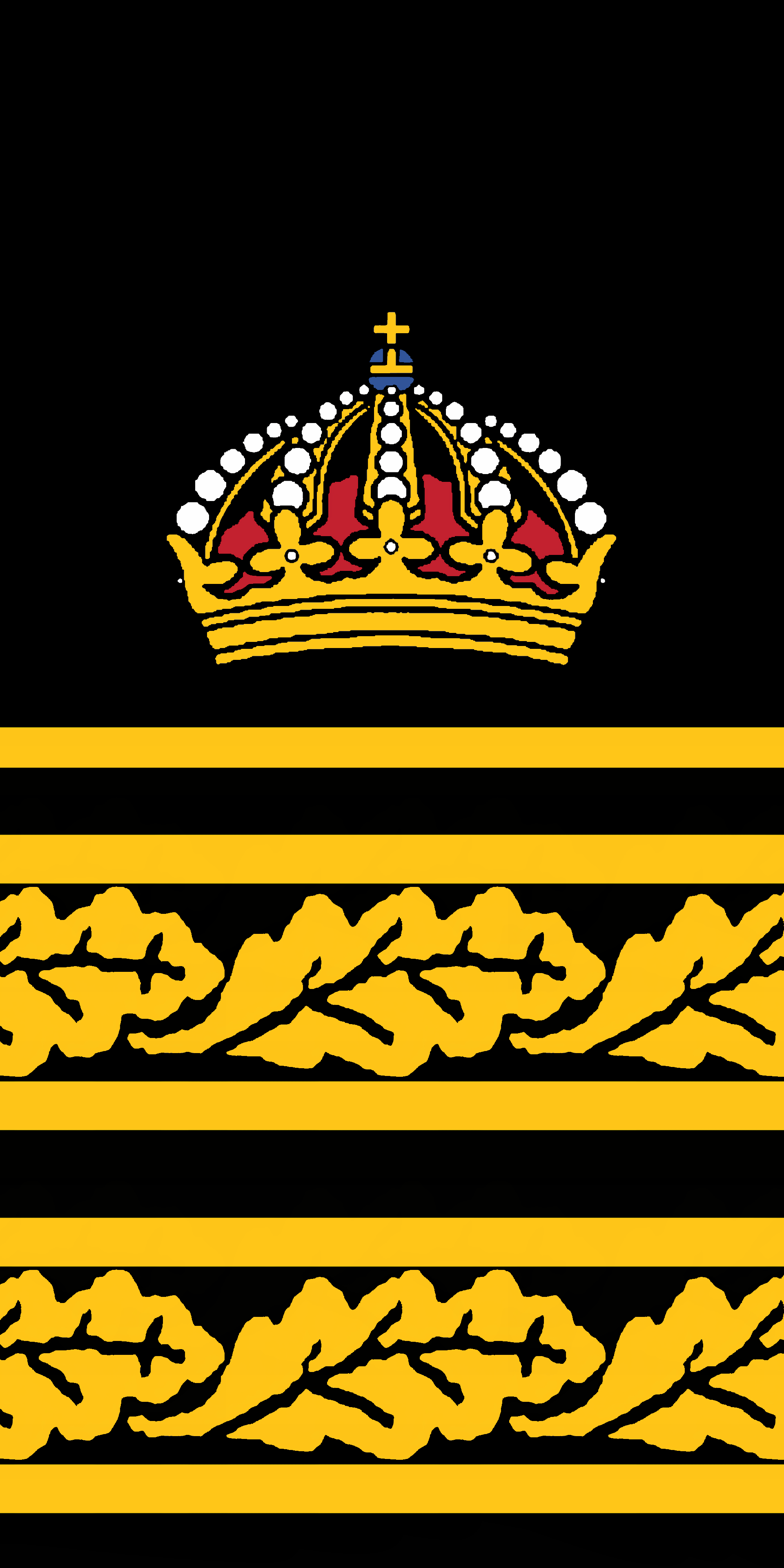
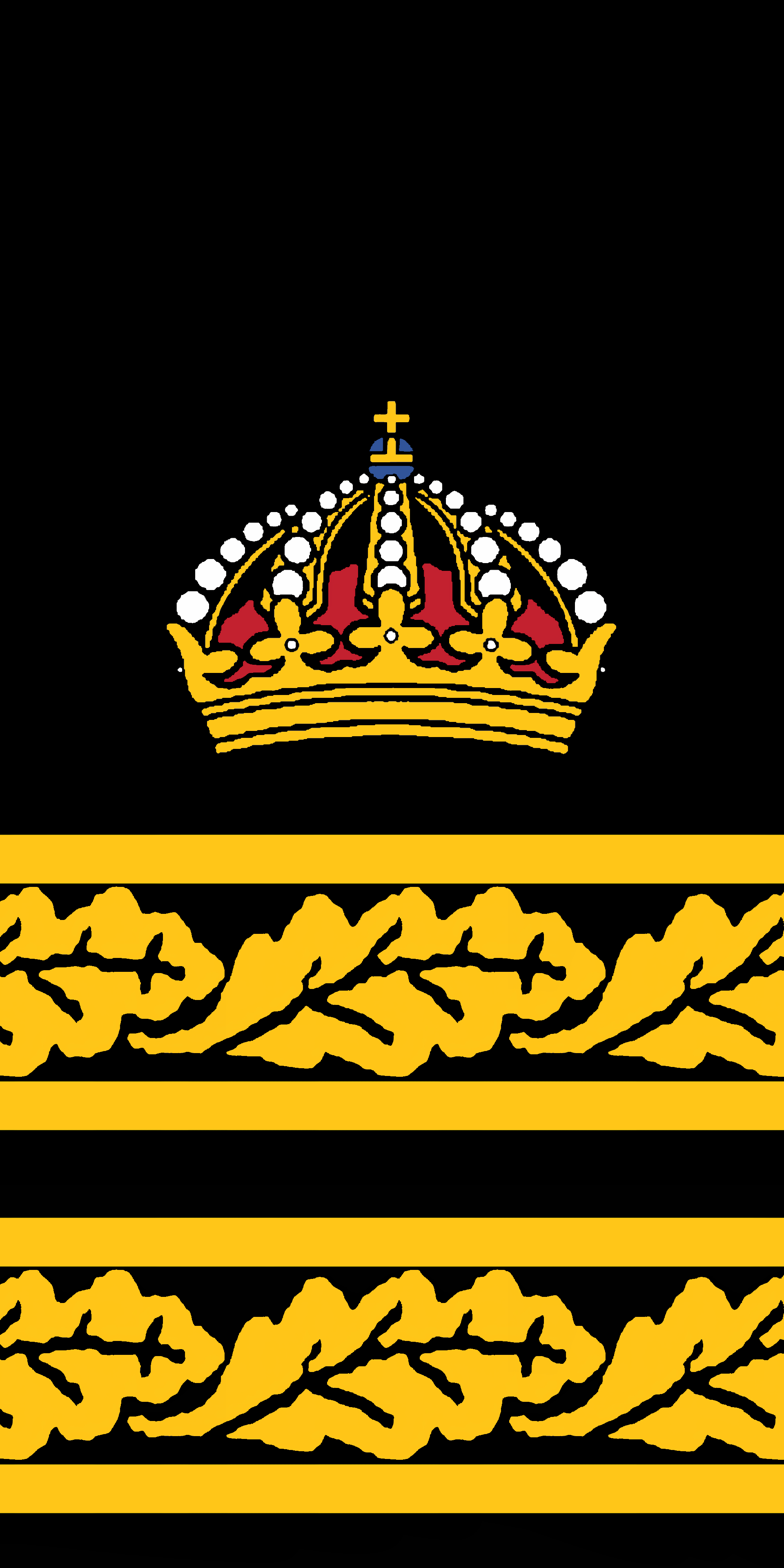
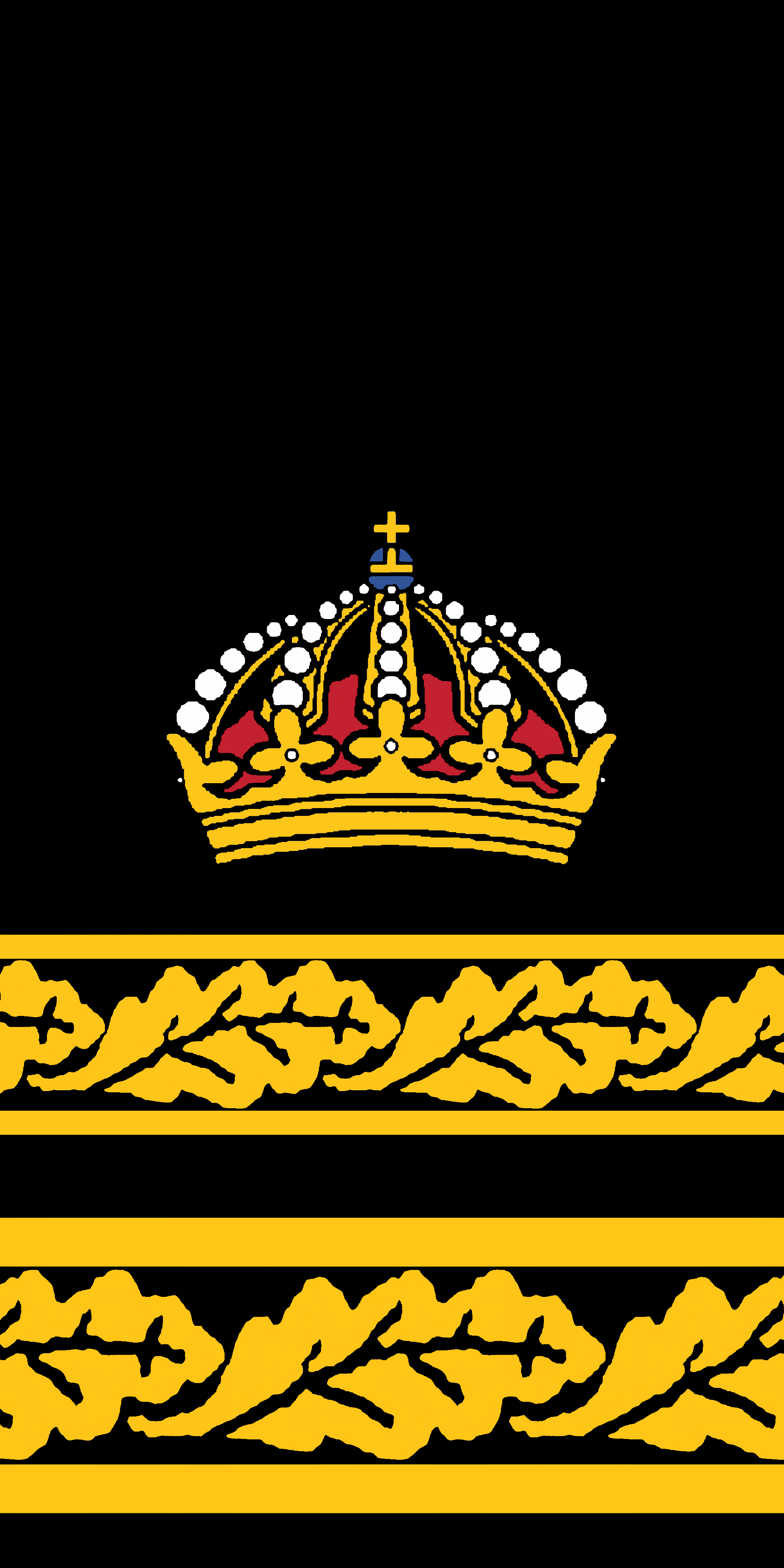
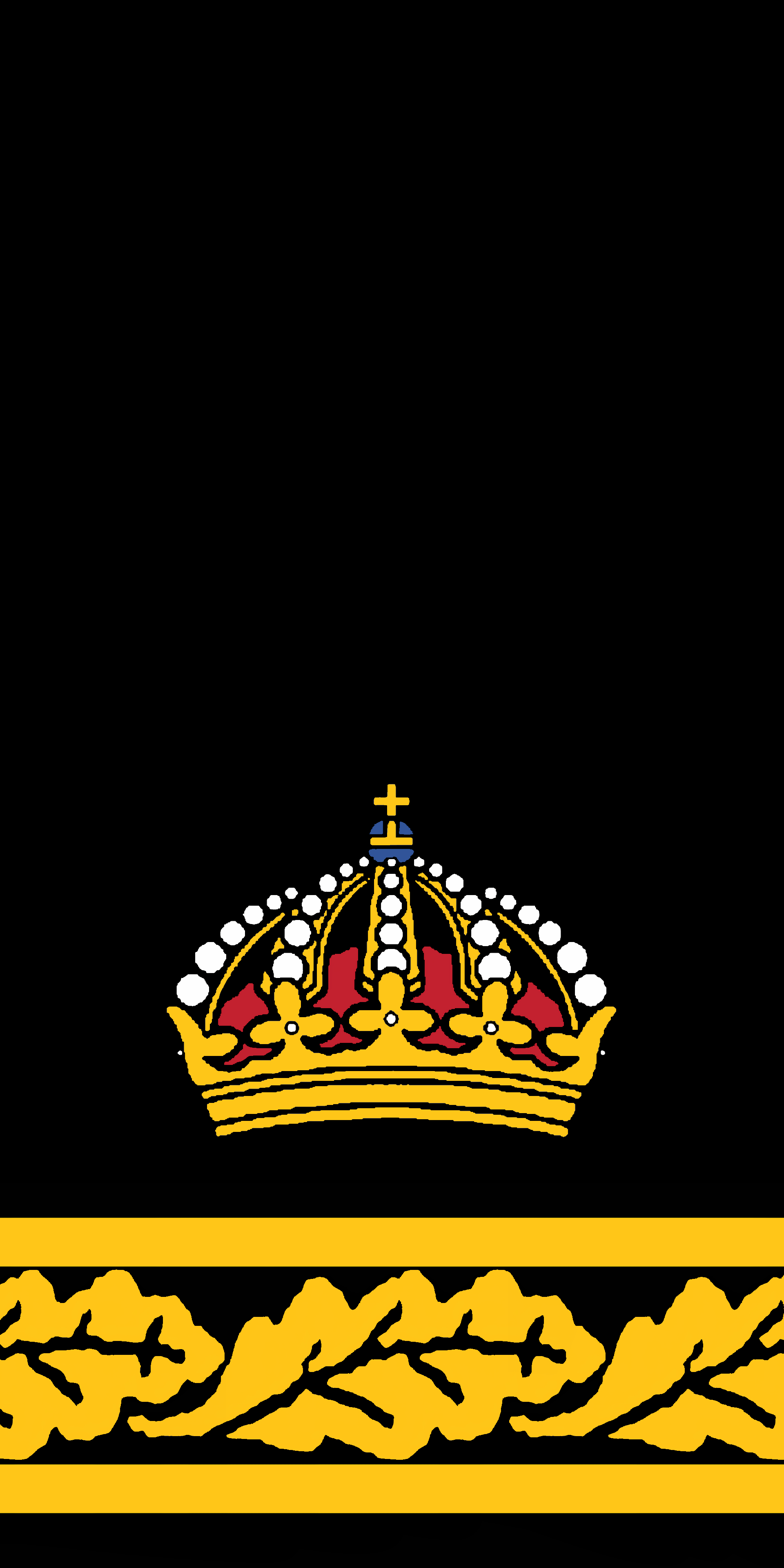
No.	1	2	3	4	5	6	7	8	9
	Rikspolischef; Säkerhetspolischef	Biträdande säkerhetspolischef	Polisdirektör	Biträdande polisdirektör	Polismästare	Polismästare	Polisöverintendent	Polisintendent	Polissekreterare
	Commissioner of the Swedish Police Authority * Commissioner of the Swedish Security Service	Deputy commissioner of the Swedish Security Service	Assistant commissioner regional police chief and equivalent	Deputy assistant commissioner assistant regional police chief and equivalent	Commander manager level 5	Commander manager level 4	Chief superintendent district police chief and equivalent	Superintendent chief of local police area and equivalent	Assistant superintendent

=== Inspectors and sergeants ===
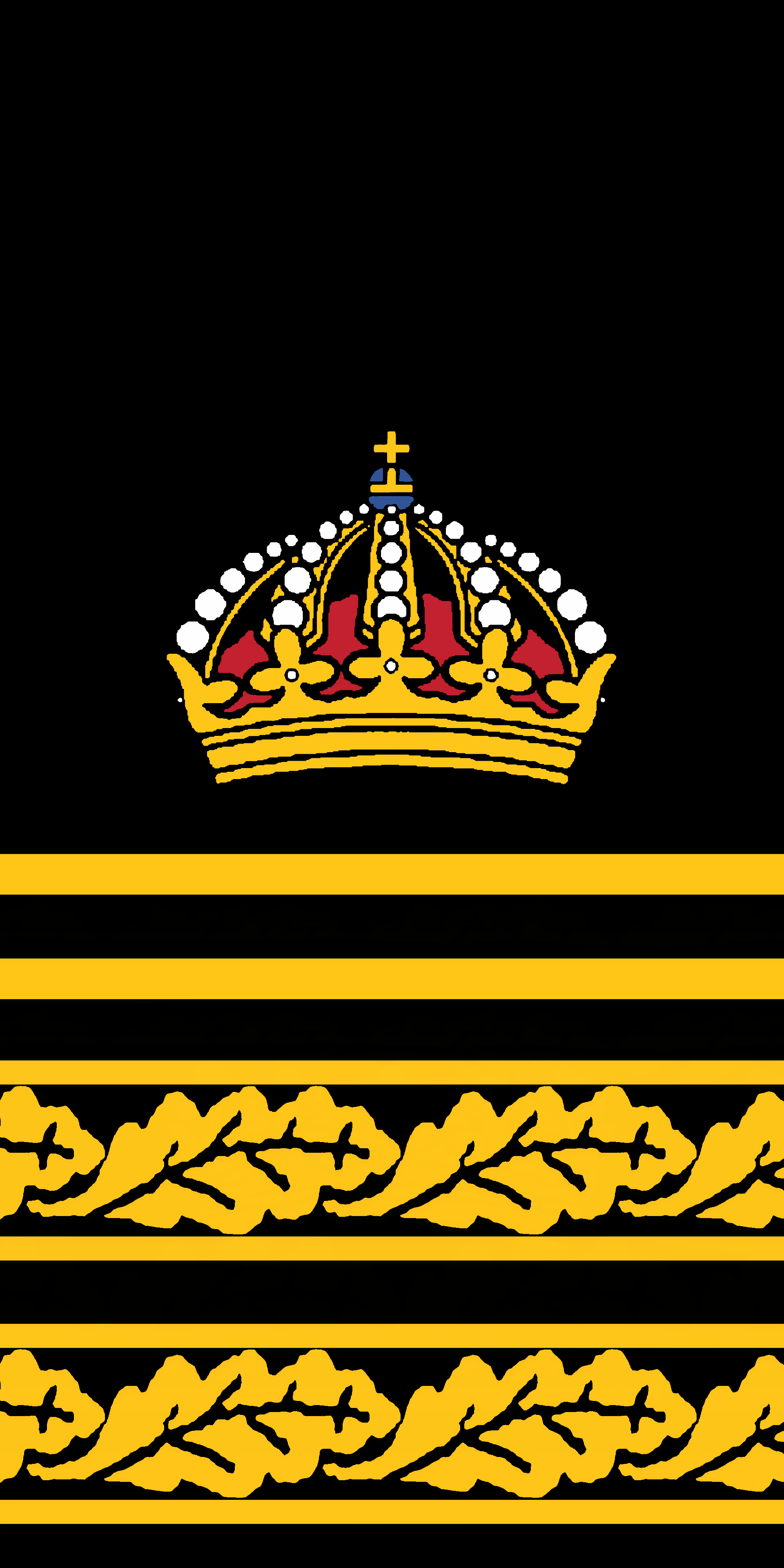
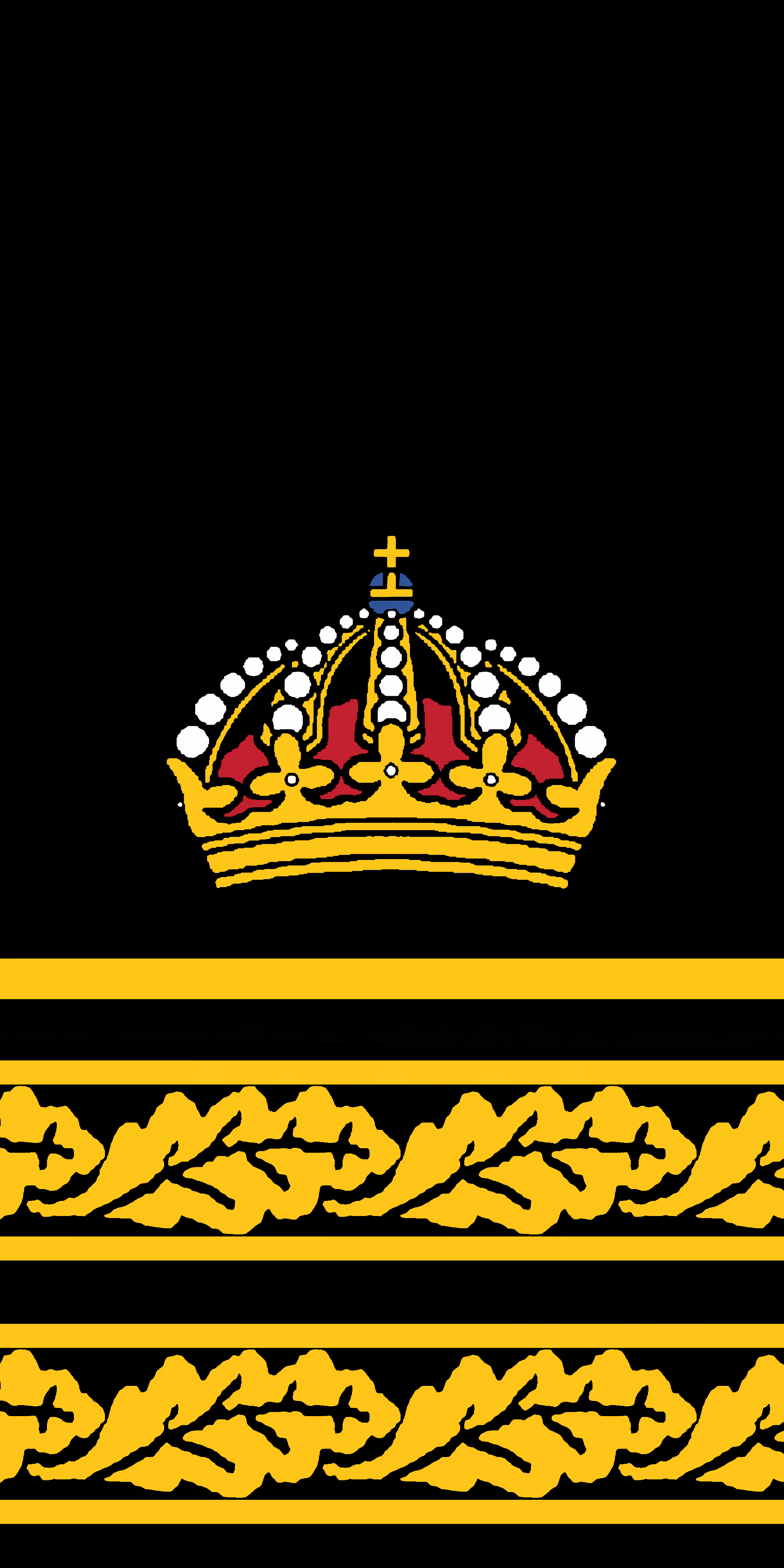
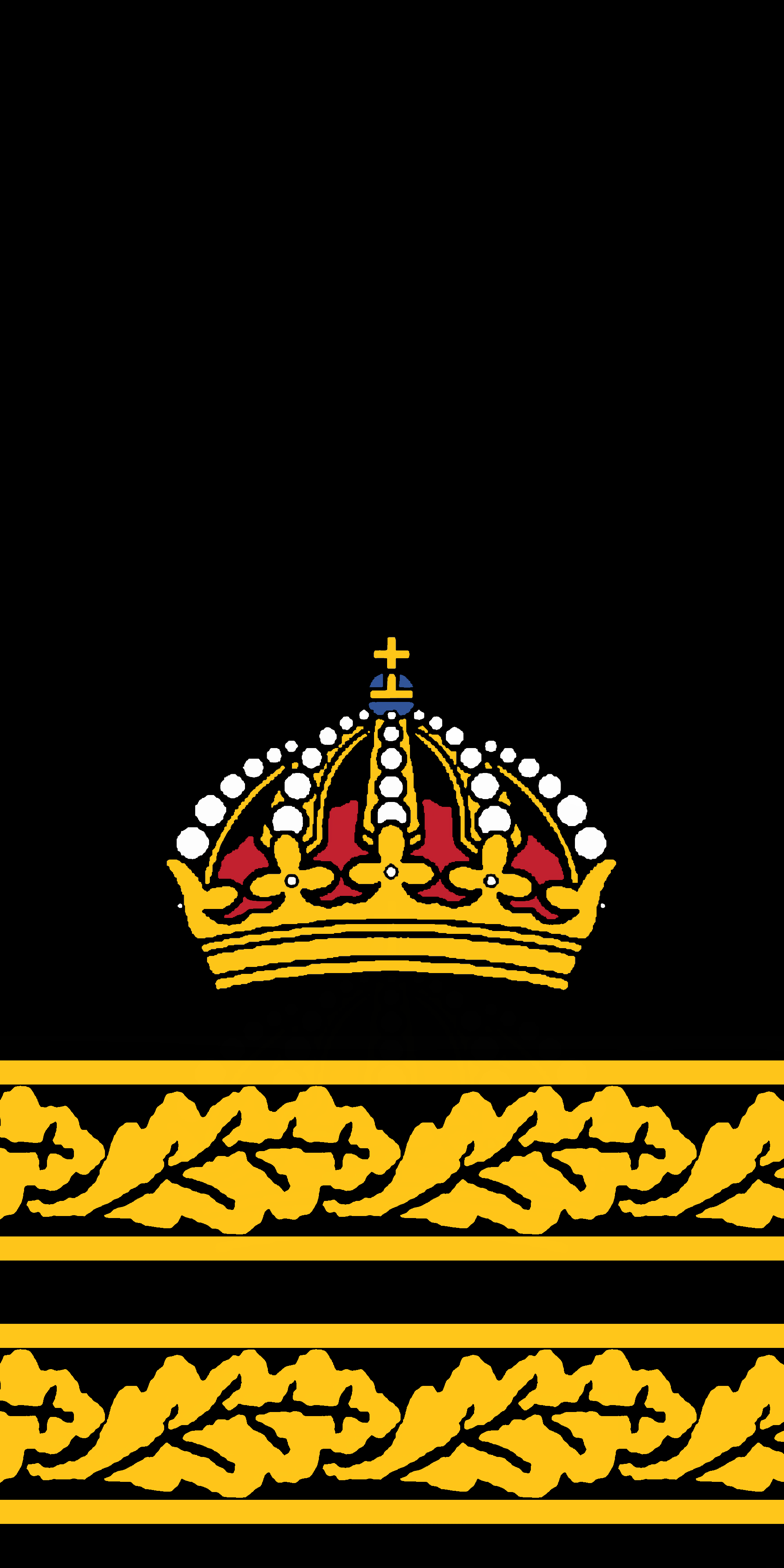
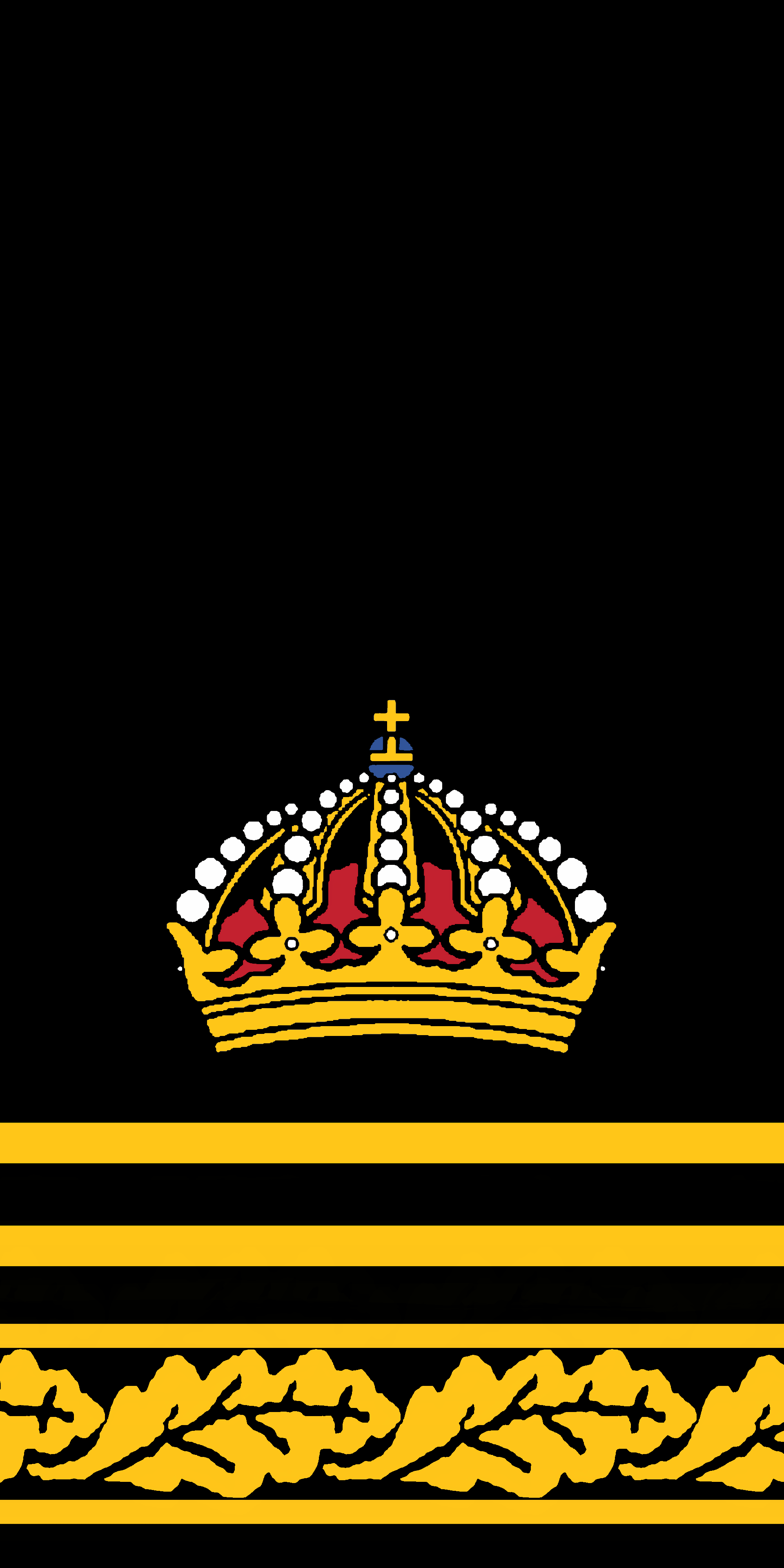
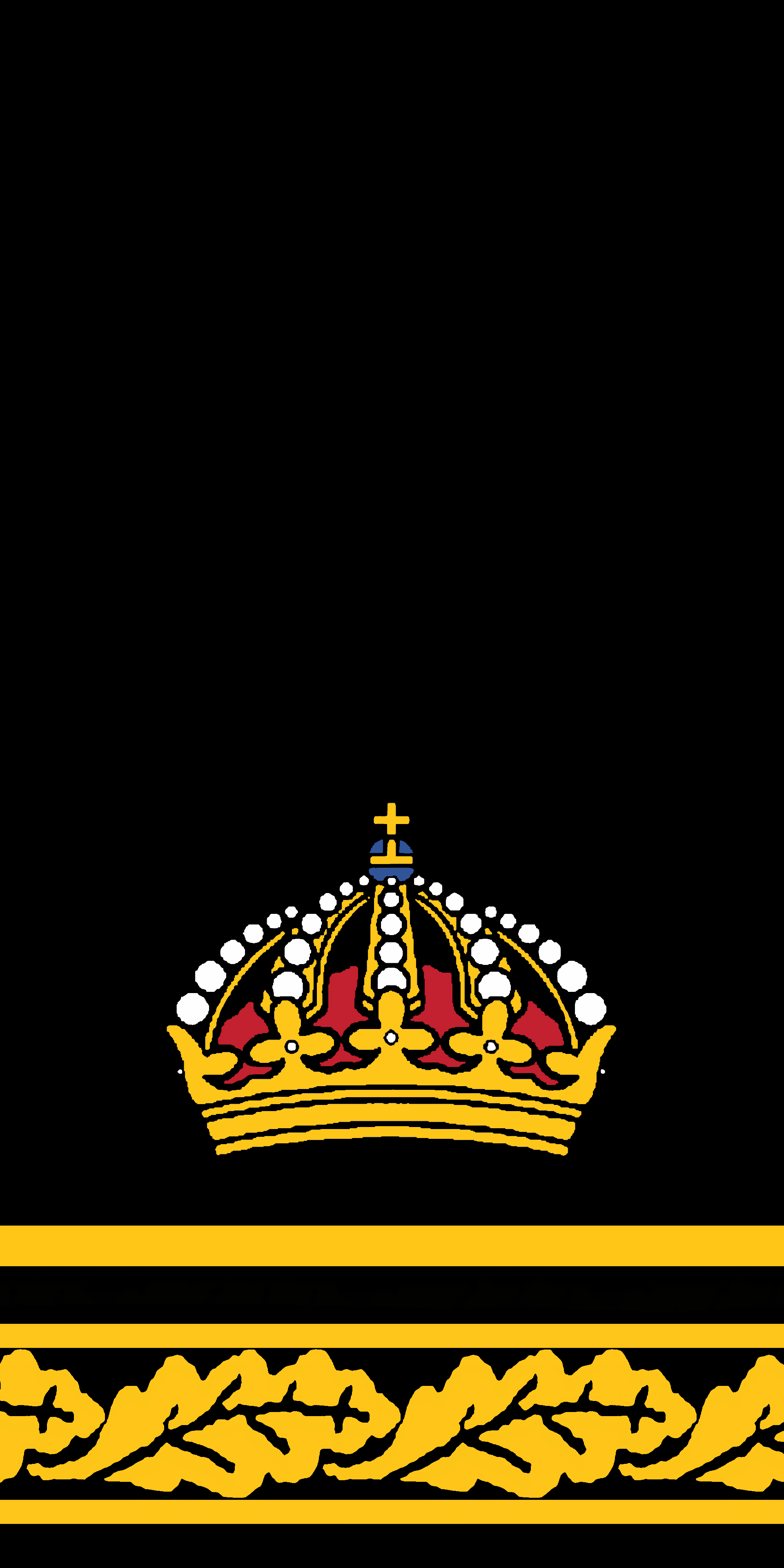
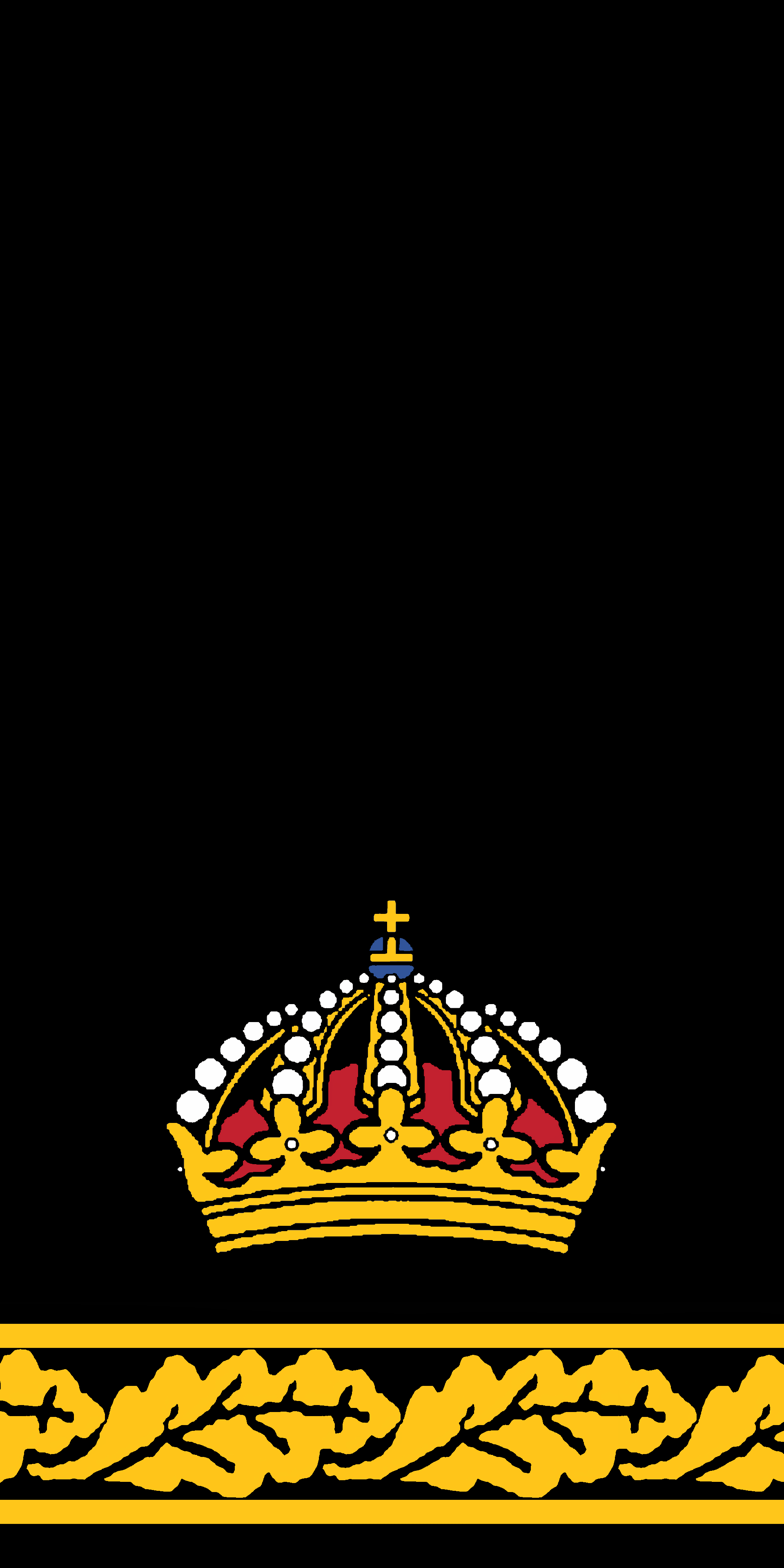
No.	10	11	12	13	14	15
	Poliskommissarie	Poliskommissarie	Poliskommissarie	Polisinspektör	Polisinspektör	Polisinspektör
	Chief inspector manager level 3 or 4	Chief inspector assistant manager level 3 or 4	Inspector	Sergeant sub-unit commander	Sergeant field supervisor	Sergeant

=== Constables and cadets ===
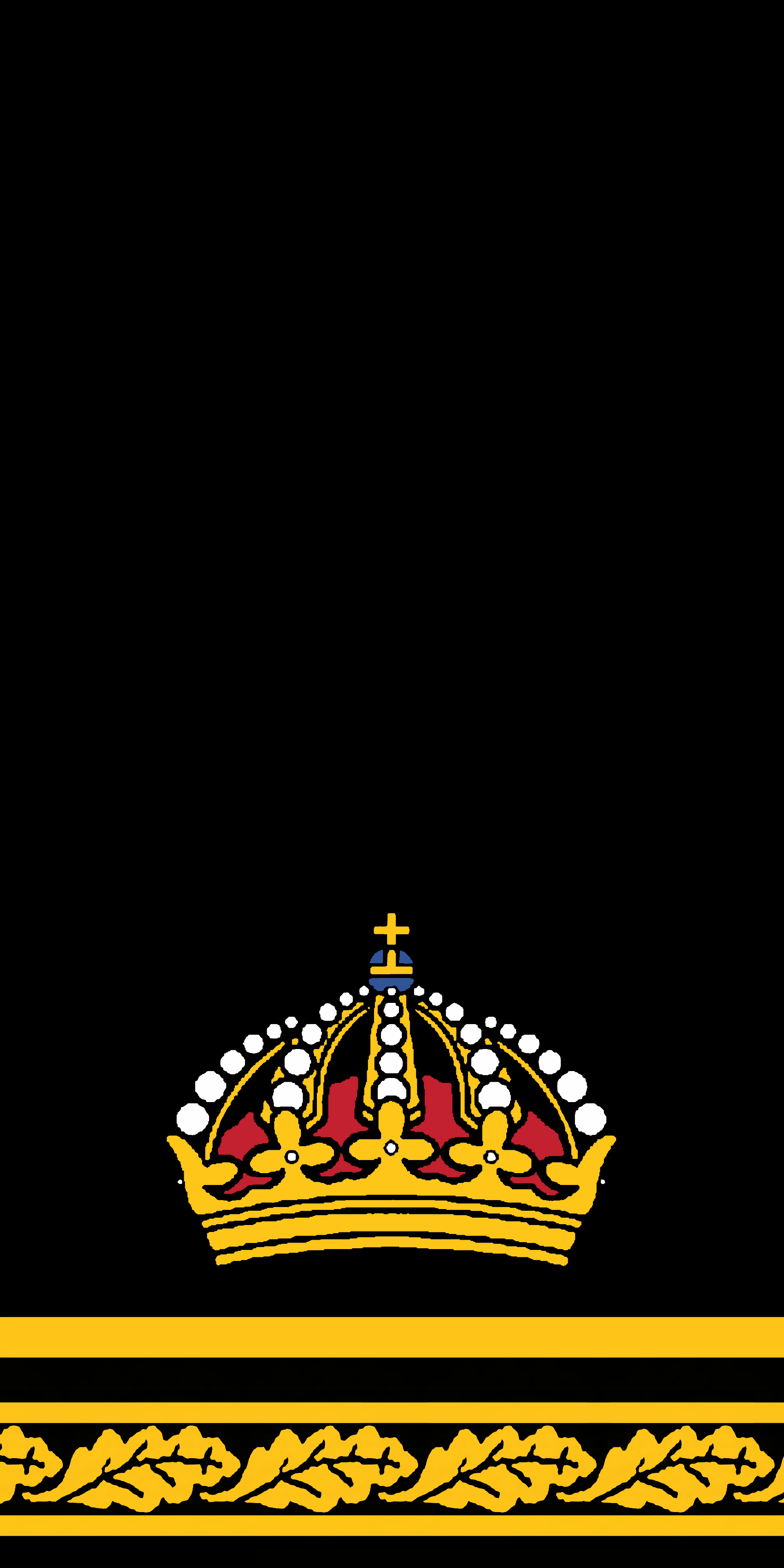
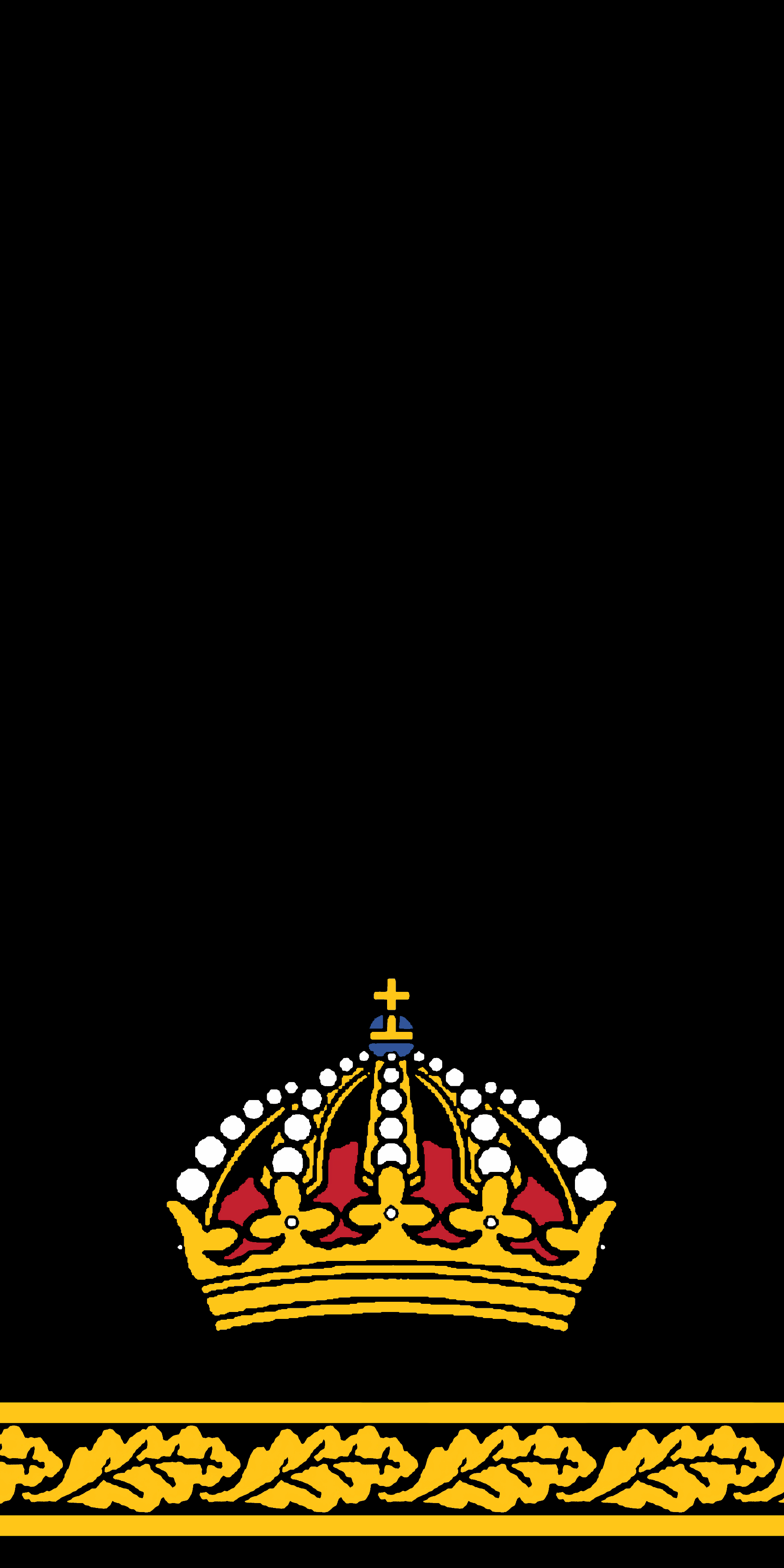
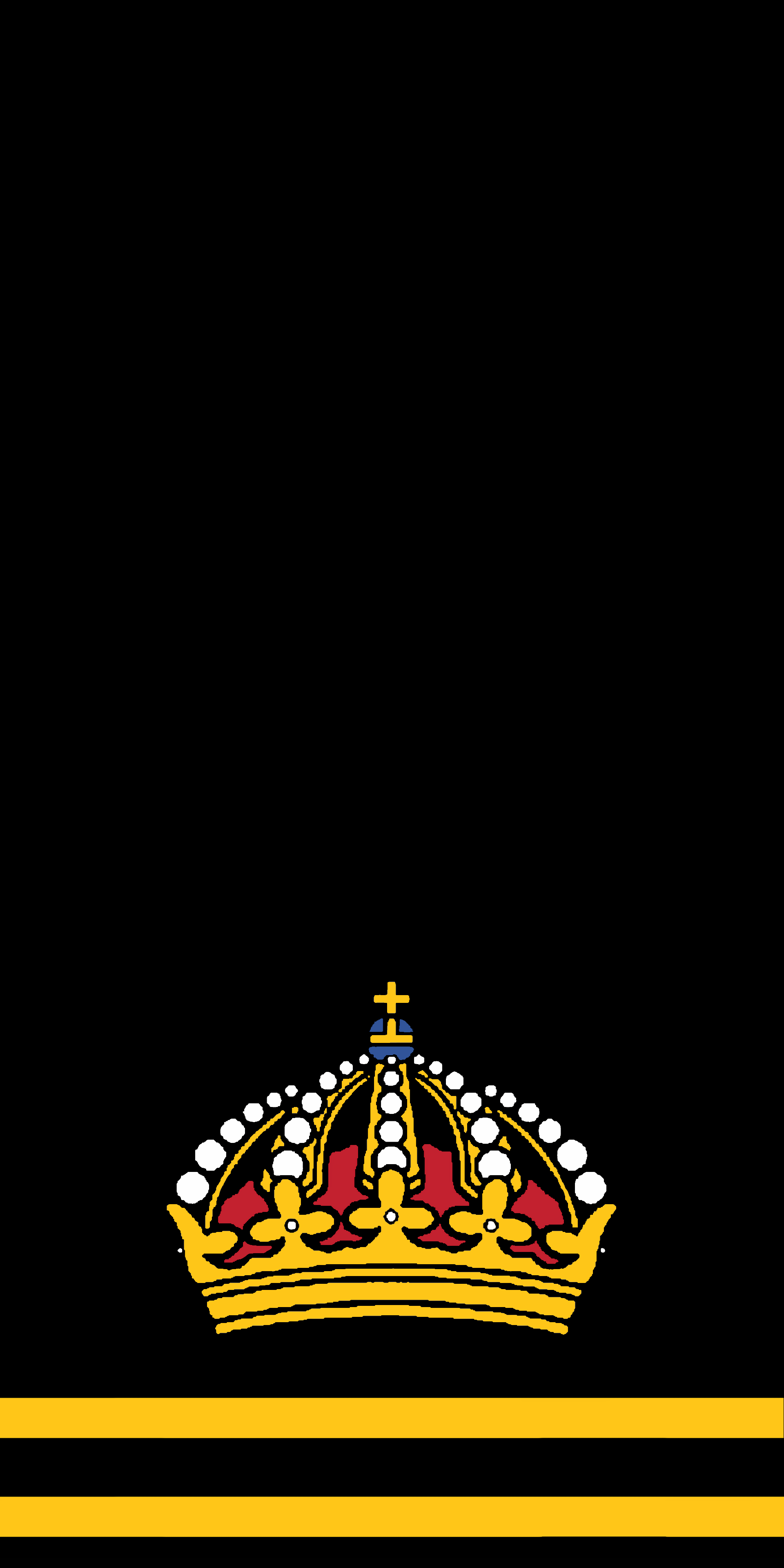
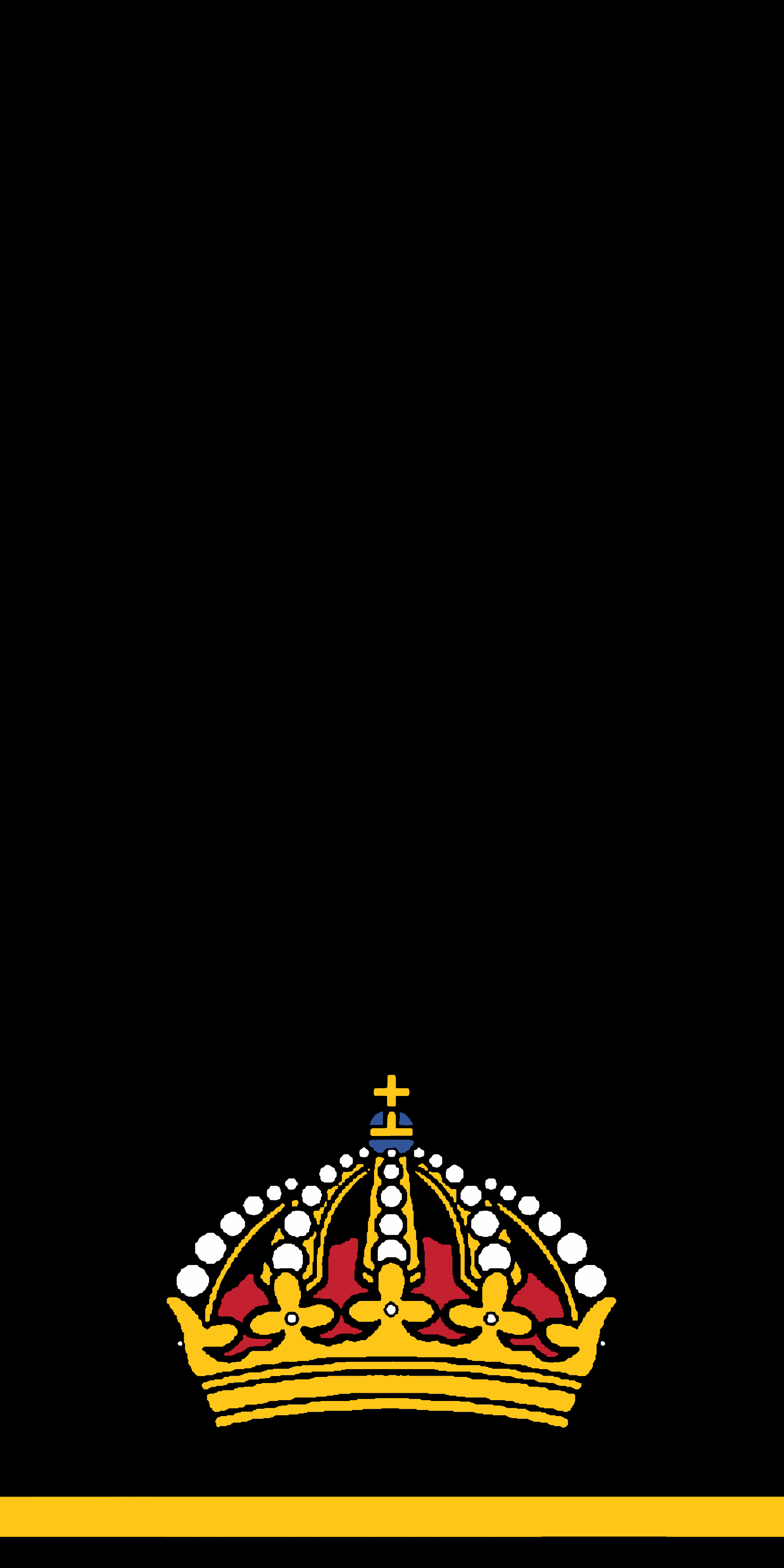
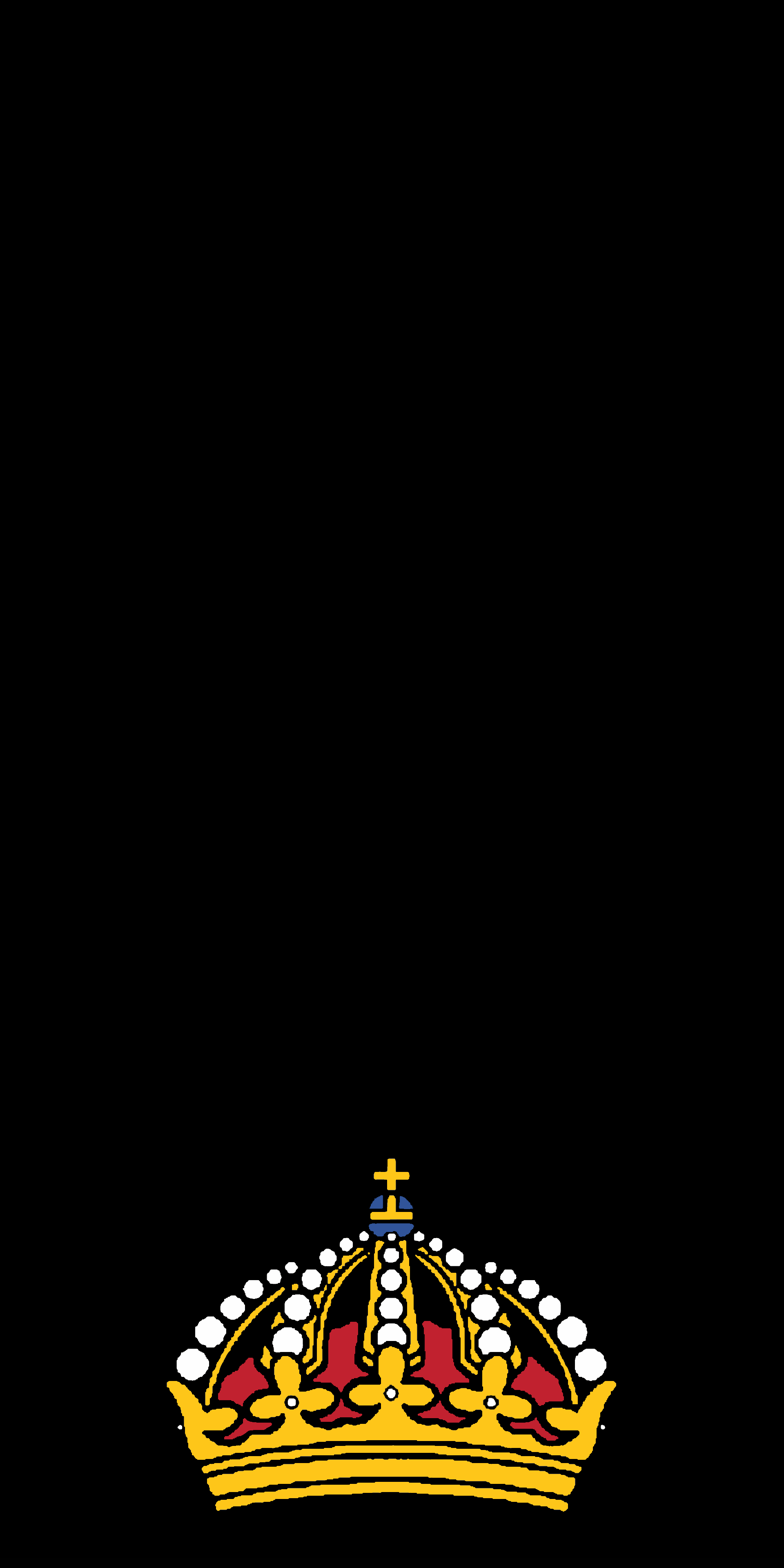
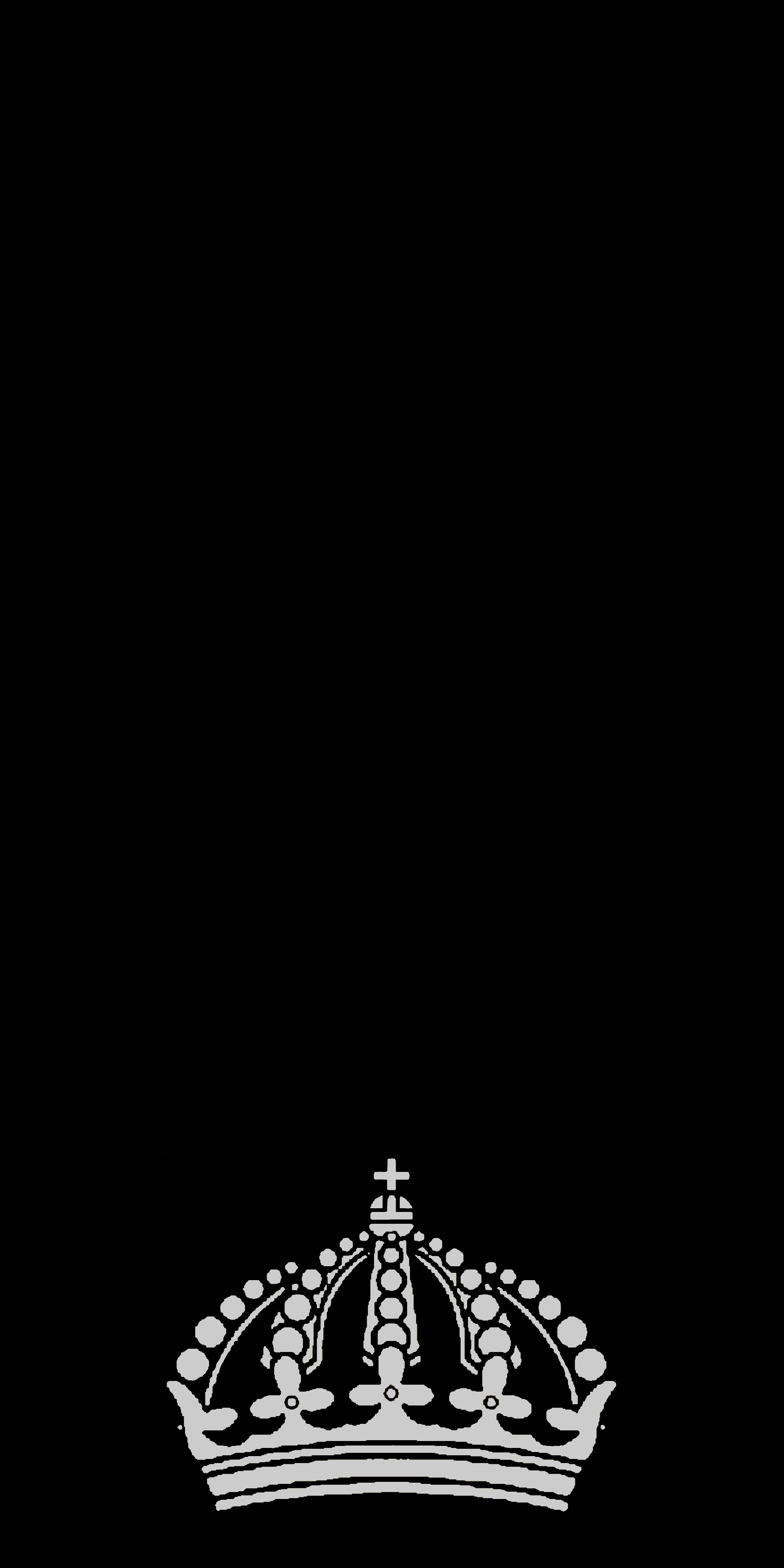
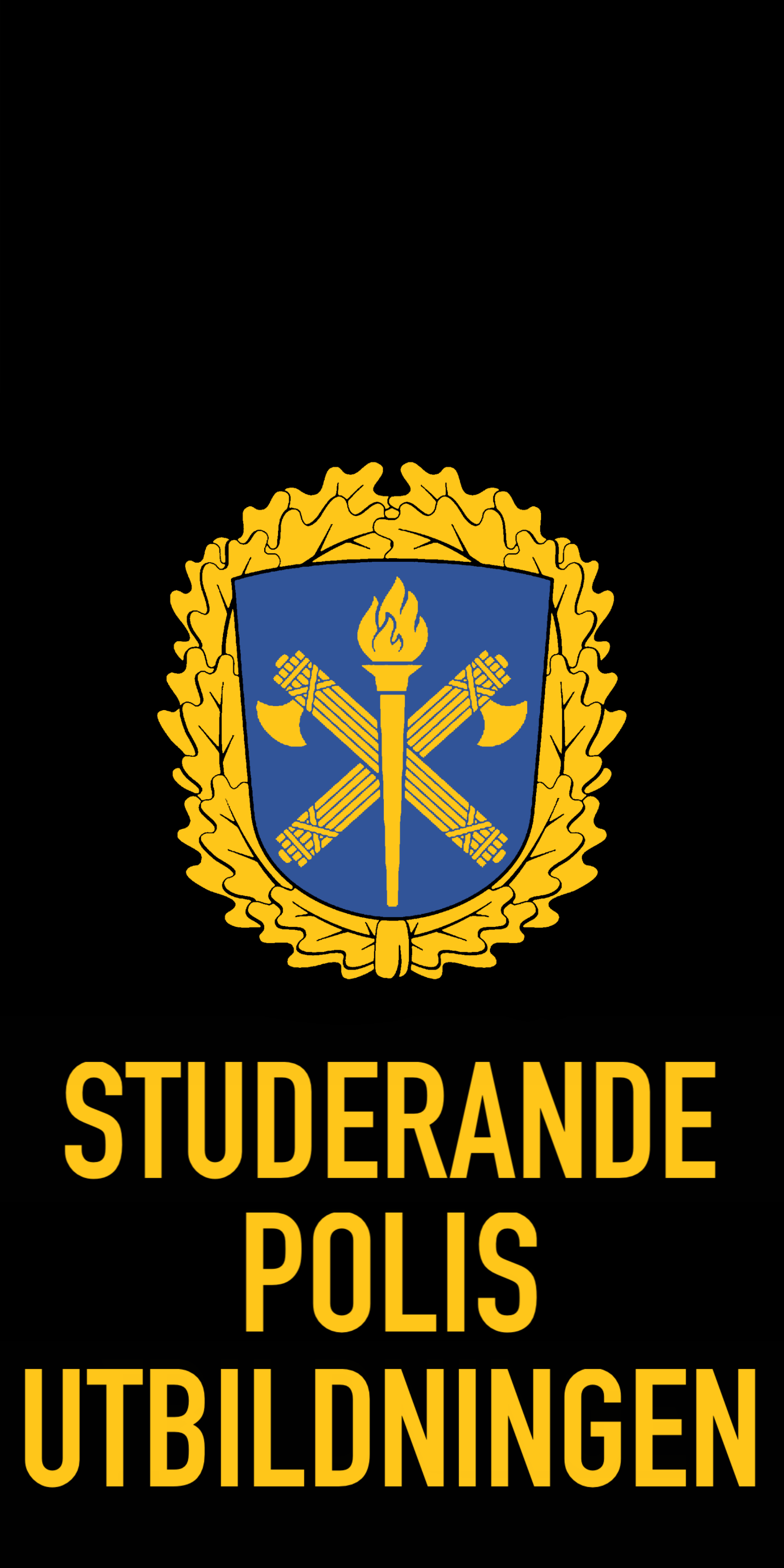
No.	16	17	18	19	20	21	22
	Polisassistent	Polisassistent	Polisassistent	Polisassistent	Polisassistent	Polisaspirant	Polisstuderande
	Constable employee level 5	Constable employee level 4	Constable employee level 3	Constable employee level 2 or <4 years of service	Constable employee level 1 or >4 years of service	Probationary constable police trainee	Cadet cadets at the police academies

== Switzerland ==
=== Gendarmerie of Vaud ===
==== Officers ====
Rank group	Officiers supérieurs			Officiers subalternes
Gendarmerie Vaudoise
Gendarmerie Vaudoise	Colonel; Colonel	Lieutenant-Colonel; Lieutenant-Colonel	Major; Major	Capitaine; Captain	Premier-lieutenant; First Lieutenant	Lieutenant; Lieutenant

==== Other ranks ====
Rank group	Sous-officiers supérieurs		Sous-officiers		Gendarmes
Gendarmerie Vaudoise
Gendarmerie Vaudoise	Adjudant; Warrant Officer	Sergent-major; Sergeant-Major	Sergent; Sergeant	Caporal; Corporal	Appointé; Specialist	Gendarme; Constable

== Turkey ==
Police

	Directors					Inspectors				Constables
General Directorate of Security
General Directorate of Security	Director general Emniyet Genel Müdürü	Director 1st grade 1. Sinif Emniyet Muduru	Director 2nd grade 2. Sinif Emniyet Muduru	Director 3rd grade 3. Sinif Emniyet Muduru	Director 4th grade '4. Sinif Emniyet Muduru	Superintendent; Emniyet Amiri	Chief Inspector; Başkomiser	Inspector; Komiser	Deputy Inspector; Komiser Yardımcısı	Sergeant; Kıdemli Başpolis Memuru	Corporal; Başpolis Memur	Police officer Polis Memuru

Gendarmerie

NATO code	OF-10	OF-9	OF-8	OF-7	OF-6	OF-5	OF-4	OF-3	OF-2	OF-1
Turkish Gendarmerie
Turkish Gendarmerie		Orgeneral	Korgeneral	Tümgeneral	Tuğgeneral	Albay	Yarbay	Binbaşı	Yüzbaşı	Üsteğmen	Teğmen	Asteğmen

NATO code	OR-9	OR-8	OR-7	OR-6	OR-5		OR-4			OR-3	OR-2	OR-1
Turkish Gendarmerie
Turkish Gendarmerie	Astsubay kıdemli başçavuş	Astsubay başçavuş	Astsubay kıdemli üstçavuş	Astsubay üstçavuş	Astsubay kıdemli çavuş	Astsubay çavuş	Uzman Jandarma Kademeli Çavuş	I. Kıdemli Uzman Çavuş	Uzman Çavuş	Uzman onbaşı

== Ukraine ==
The ranks used by the National Guard of Ukraine are the same as the ones used by the Armed Forces of Ukraine.

Officers

Rank group	General / flag officers			Senior officers			Junior officers
National Police of Ukraine
National Police of Ukraine	First division general Генерал поліції 1-го рангу	Second division general Генерал поліції 2-го рангу	Third division general Генерал поліції 3-го рангу	Colonel; Полковник поліції	Lieutenant colonel Підполковник поліції	Major; Майор поліції	Captain; Капітан поліції	Senior lieutenant Старший лейтенант поліції	Lieutenant; Лейтенант поліції	Junior lieutenant Молодший лейтенант поліції
NATO code equivalent	OF-8	OF-7	OF-6	OF-5	OF-4	OF-3	OF-2	OF-1a	OF-1b	OF-1c

Junior officers

Rank group	Senior NCOs	Junior NCOs		Enlisted
	Junior officers
National Police of Ukraine
National Police of Ukraine	Senior Sergeant; Старший сержант поліції	Sergeant; Сержант поліції	Corporal; Капрал поліції	Constable police officer Рядовий поліції

== United Kingdom ==
Great Britain police ranks and insignia
Rank	Chief constable	Deputy chief constable	Assistant chief constable	Chief superintendent	Superintendent	Chief inspector	Inspector	Sergeant	Constable
Epaulette insignia									

Metropolitan Police Service ranks and insignia
Rank	Commissioner	Deputy commissioner	Assistant commissioner	Deputy assistant commissioner	Commander	Chief superintendent	Superintendent	Chief inspector	Inspector	Sergeant	Constable
Epaulette insignia											

Police Service of Northern Ireland ranks and insignia
Rank	Chief constable	Deputy chief constable	Assistant chief constable	Chief superintendent	Superintendent	Chief inspector	Inspector	Sergeant	Constable
Epaulette insignia						PSNI chief inspector			

== Vatican City State ==
Officers

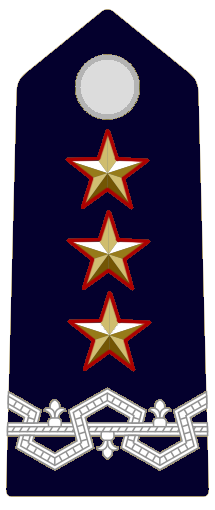
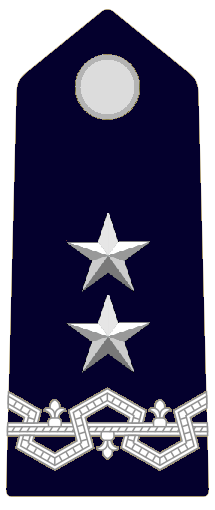
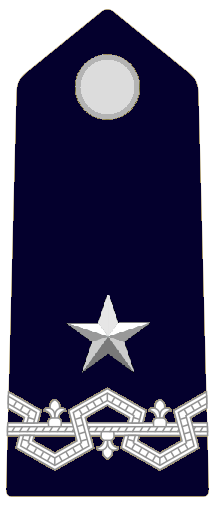
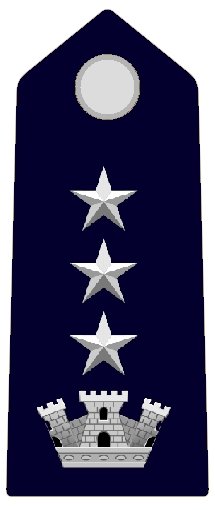
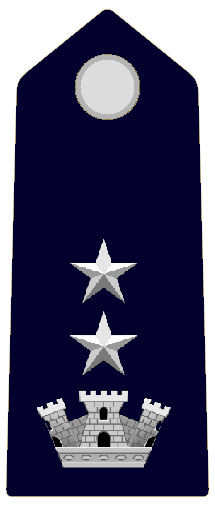
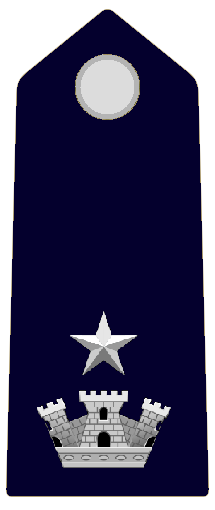
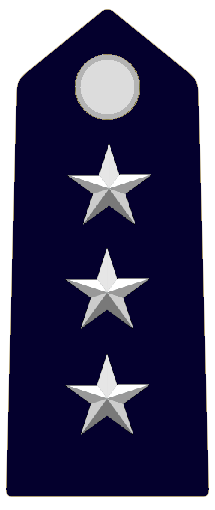
Rank group	General / flag officers			Senior officers			Junior officers
Gendarmerie of Vatican City
Gendarmerie of Vatican City	Ispettore generale	Dirigente generale	Dirigente superiore	Primo dirigente	Dirigente	Commissario	Vice commissario

Others

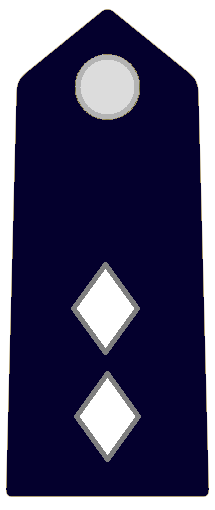
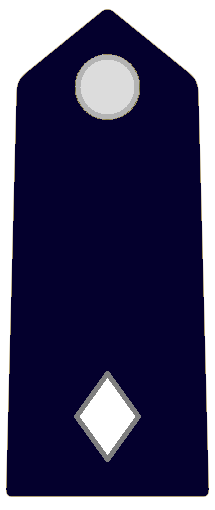
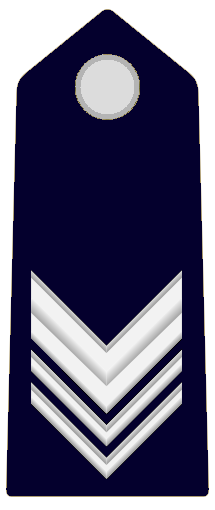
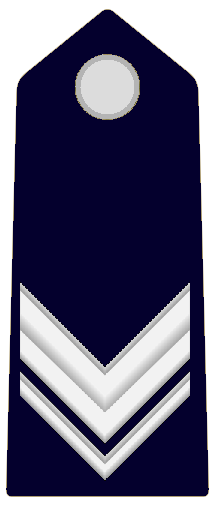
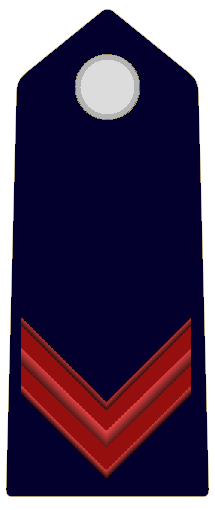
Rank group	Senior NCOs		Junior NCOs		Enlisted
Gendarmerie of Vatican City
Gendarmerie of Vatican City	Ispettore	Vice ispettore	Brigadiere	Vice brigadiere	Gendarme

== See also ==
- List of police ranks
- List of police ranks in Africa
- List of police ranks in Asia
- List of police ranks in Oceania
- List of police ranks in the Americas
- Military rank
- Fire department ranks by country
- Ranks and insignia of gendarmeries
