= List of police ranks in Africa =

Element of hierarchy in law enforcement

Police ranks are a system of hierarchical relationships in police organizations. The rank system defines authority and responsibility in a police organization, and affects the culture within the police force. Police ranks, dependent on country, are similar to military ranks in function and design due to policing in many countries developing from military organizations and operations, such as in Western Europe, former Soviet countries, and English-speaking countries. Usually, uniforms denote the bearer's rank by particular insignia affixed to the uniforms.

Rank is not only used to designate leadership, but to establish pay-grade as well. As rank increases, pay-grade follows, but so does the amount of responsibility.

== Algeria ==
Rank group	Director		Sergeant			Inspectors			Constables
(Algeria) Algerian police
(Algeria) Algerian police	Contrôleur général de police	Contrôleur de police	Commissaire divisionnaire de police	Commissaire principal de police	Commissaire de police	Lieutenant de police	Inspecteur principal de police	Inspecteur de police	Brigadier-chef	Brigadier de police	Agent de l'ordre public

== Botswana ==
Ranks of the Botswana Police Service:

- Commissioner of police
- Deputy commissioner of police
- Senior assistant commissioner
- Assistant commissioner
- Senior superintendent
- Superintendent
- Assistant superintendent
- Inspector
- Sub-inspector
- Sergeant
- Constable
- Special constable

== Chad ==
Officers

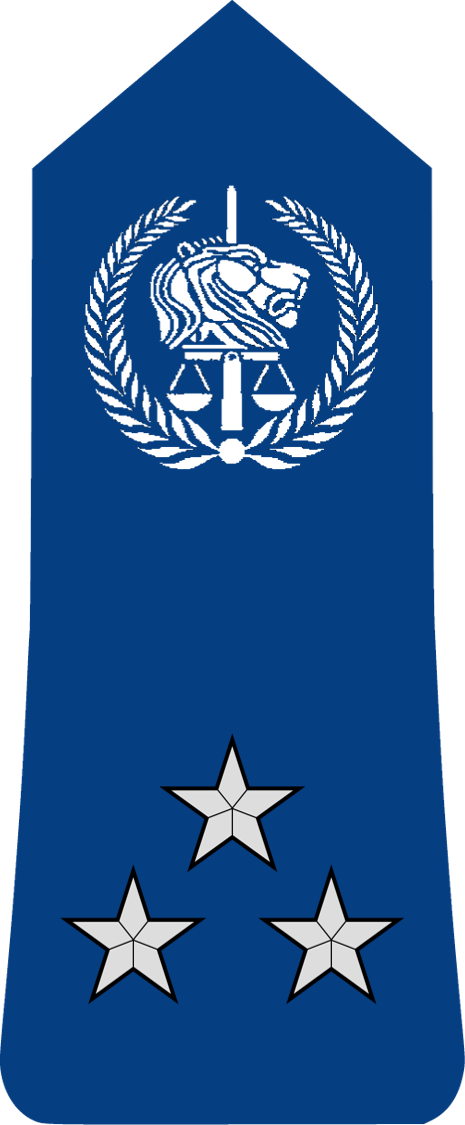
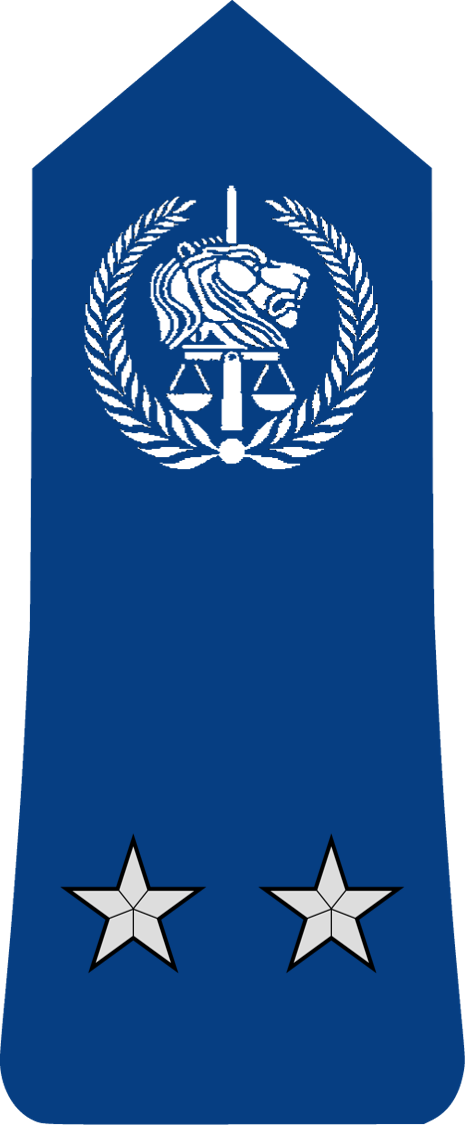
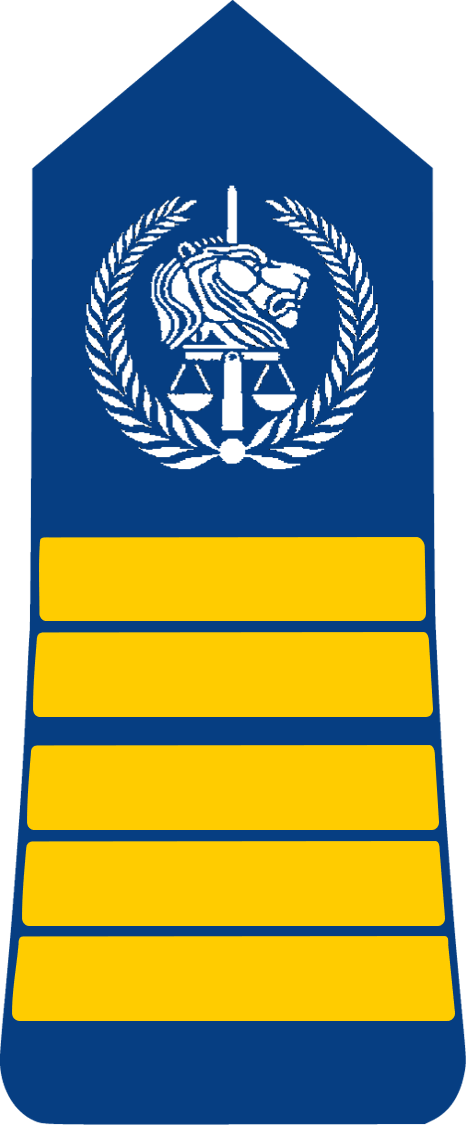
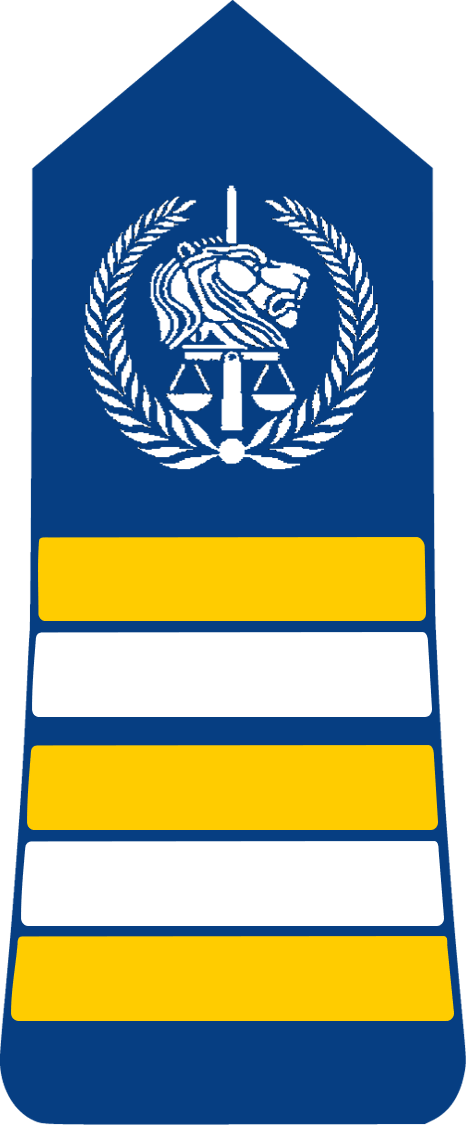
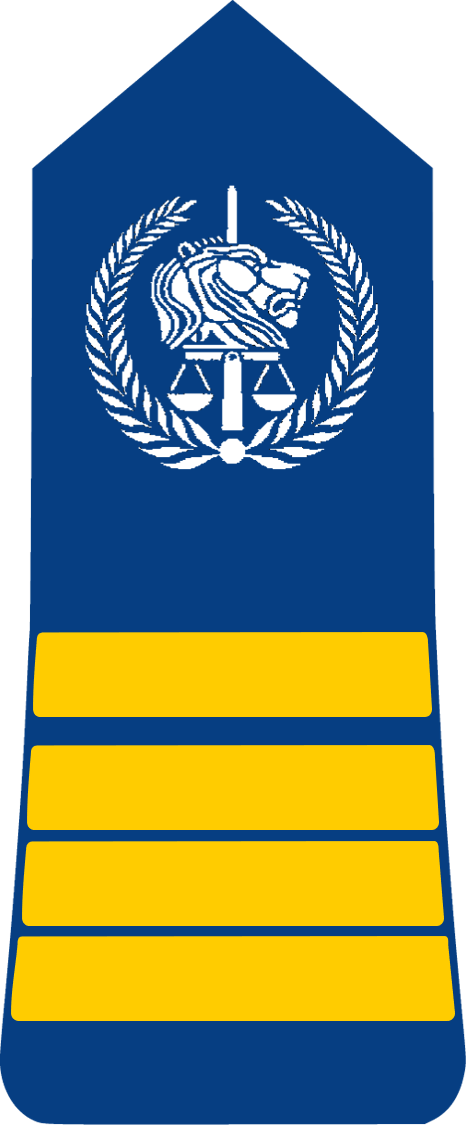
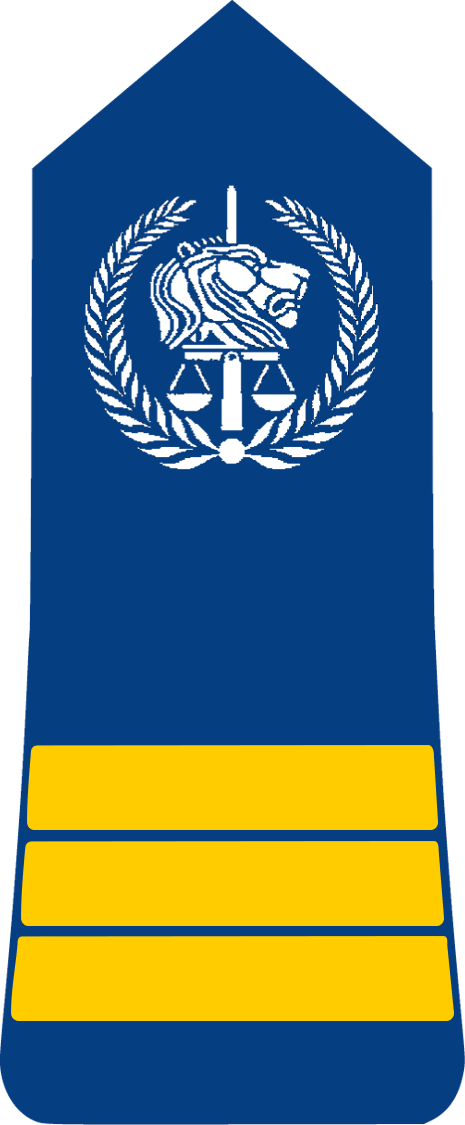
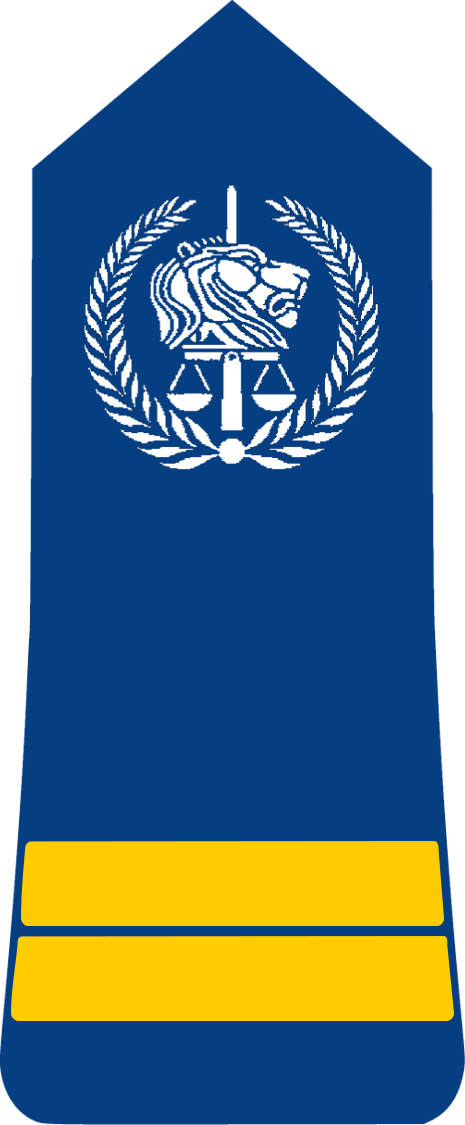
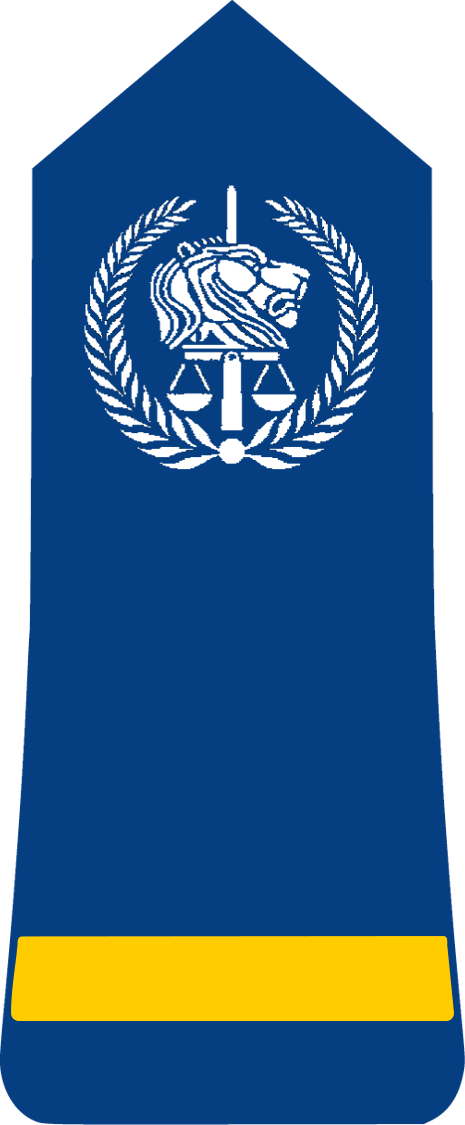
Rank group	General / flag officers		Senior officers			Junior officers
Chadian National Gendarmerie
Chadian National Gendarmerie	Général de division	Général de brigade	Colonel	Lieutenant-Colonel	Commandant	Capitaine	Lieutenant	Sous-Lieutenant

Enlisted

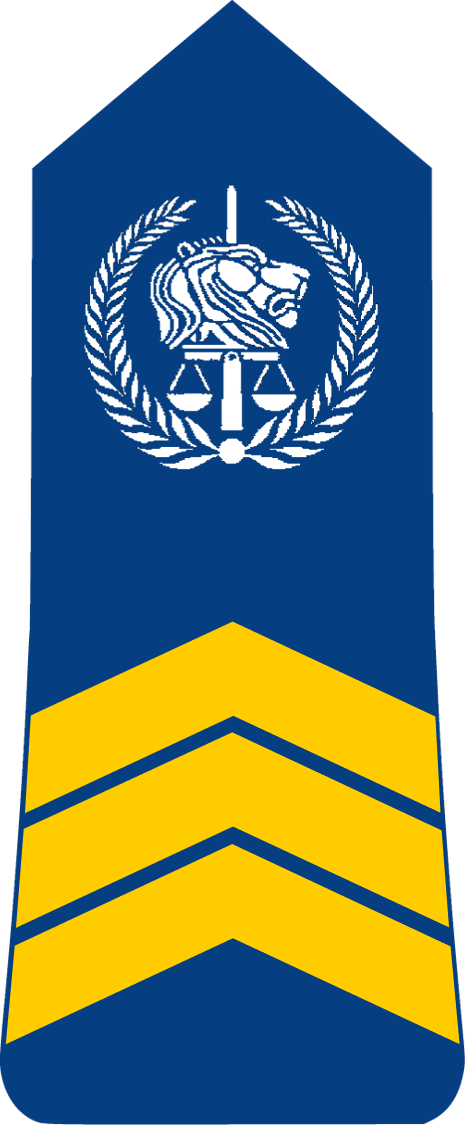
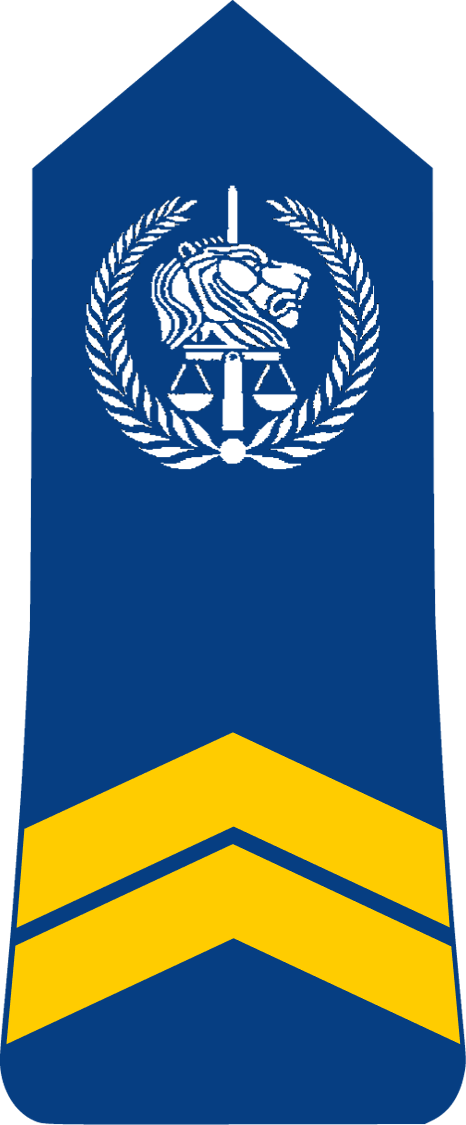
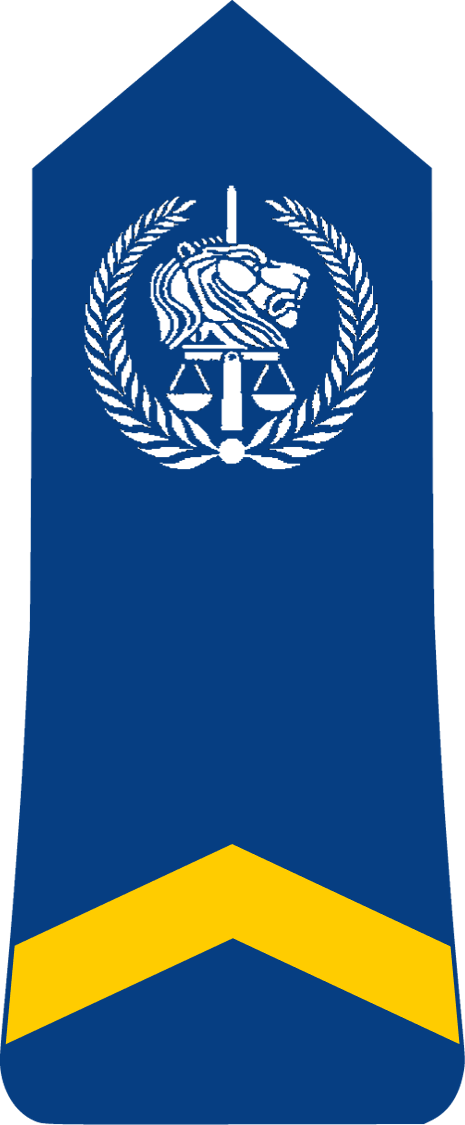
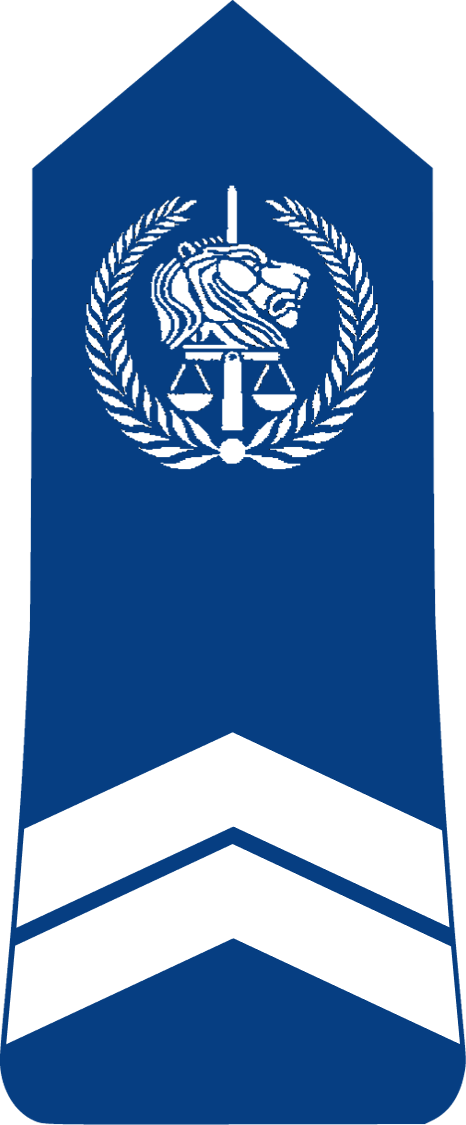
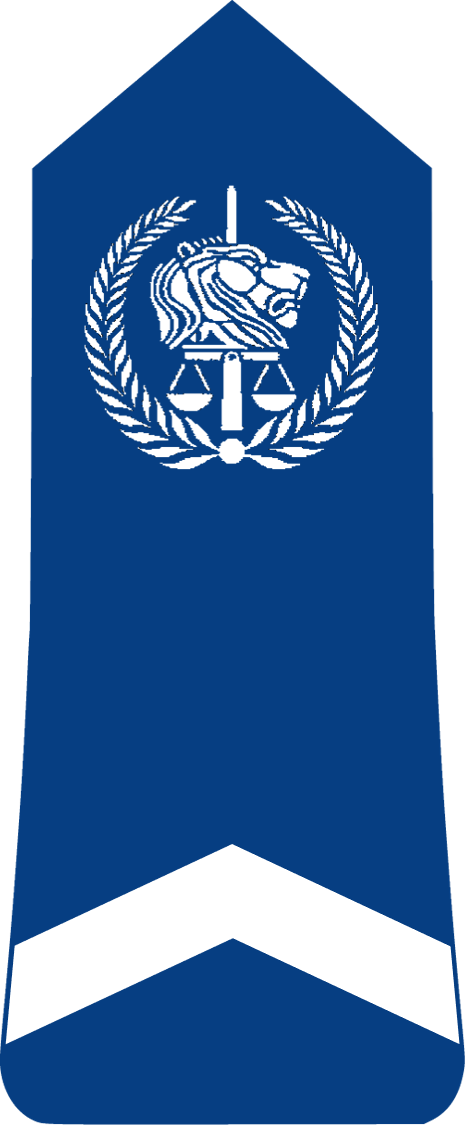
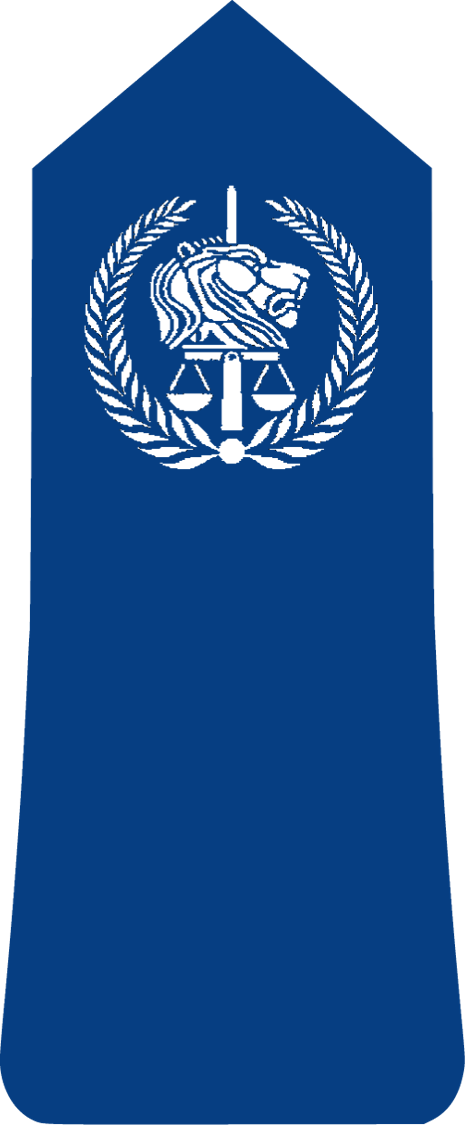
Rank group	Senior NCOs			Junior NCOs	Enlisted
Chadian National Gendarmerie
Chadian National Gendarmerie	Sergent major	Sergent-chef	Sergent	Caporal	Soldat première	Soldat

== Egypt ==
Officers

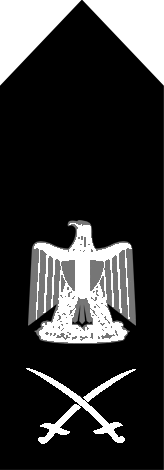
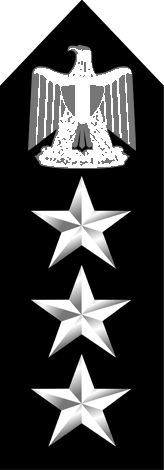
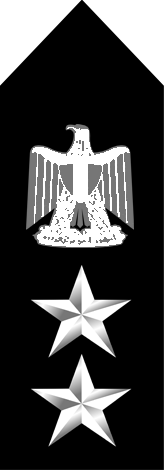
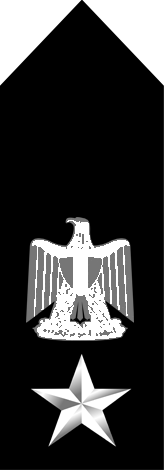
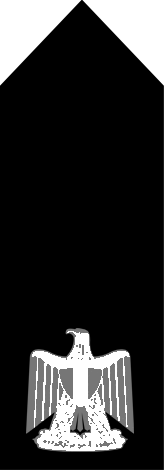
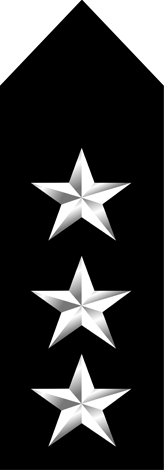
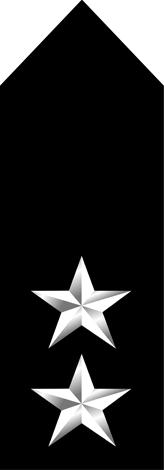
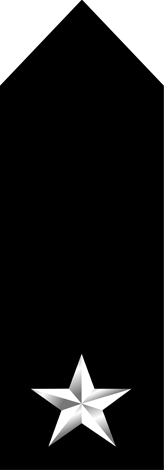
Rank group	General / flag officers		Senior officers			Junior officers
Egyptian National Police
Egyptian National Police	Liwaa' (لواء)	'amid (عميد)	'aqid (عقيد)	Moqaddim (مقدم)	Ra'id (رائد)	Naqib (نقيب)	Molazim awwal (ملازم أول)	Molazim (ملازم)
Egyptian National Police	Major general	Brigadier	Colonel	Lieutenant colonel	Major	Captain	First lieutenant	Lieutenant

Others

	Policemen
Egyptian National Police
Egyptian National Police	Master sergeant	Sergeant	Corporal	Private

== Ethiopia ==
The rank structure of the Ethiopian Federal Police is as follows:

- Commissioner general
- Deputy commissioner general
- Commissioner
- Deputy commissioner
- Assistant commissioner
- Commander
- Deputy commander
- Chief inspector
- Inspector
- Deputy inspector
- Assistant inspector
- Chief sergeant
- Sergeant
- Deputy sergeant
- Assistant sergeant
- Constable

== Kenya ==
Rank group	Inspectors general				Commissioner	Superintendent
Administration Police
Administration Police	Inspector general	Deputy inspector general	Senior assistant inspector general	Assistant inspector general	Commissioner	Senior superintendent	Superintendent	Assistant superintendent

Rank group	Inspectors
Administration Police						No insignia
Administration Police	Chief inspector	Inspector	Senior sergeant	Sergeant	Corporal	Constable

== Lesotho ==
Rank and insignia
Insignia									
Rank	Commissioner	Deputy commissioner	Assistant commissioner	Senior superintendent	Superintendent	Senior inspector	Inspector	Sergeant	Constable

== Namibia ==
Namibian Police Force ranks
Rank	Inspector general	Deputy inspector general	Assistant inspector general	Commissioner	Deputy commissioner	Assistant commissioner	Chief inspector	Assistant chief inspector	Inspector	Assistant inspector	Warrant officer class 1	Warrant officer class 2	Sergeant class 1	Sergeant class 2	Constable
Insignia															

== Nigeria ==
The ranks within the Nigeria Police Force are established by law, including the Police Act of 2020. The structure flows from the Inspector-General of Police as the highest rank to the Constable as the lowest.

The full hierarchy of the Nigeria Police Force ranks, from highest to lowest, is as follows:

Commissioned Officers (Superior Police Officers)

- Inspector-General of Police (IGP): The head of the entire force, appointed by the President.
- Deputy Inspector-General of Police (DIG): The second-in-command of the Force.
- Assistant Inspector-General of Police (AIG).
- Commissioner of Police (CP): In charge of police contingents in a state.
- Deputy Commissioner of Police (DCP).
- Assistant Commissioner of Police (ACP).
- Chief Superintendent of Police (CSP).
- Superintendent of Police (SP).
- Deputy Superintendent of Police (DSP).
- Assistant Superintendent of Police (ASP): This rank includes ASP I and ASP II (Cadet ASP).
- Inspector of Police: Includes Inspector I and Inspector II (Cadet Inspector).

Non-Commissioned Officers (Rank-and-File)

- Sergeant Major.
- Sergeant.
- Corporal.
- Constable: The entry-level rank. This includes Police Constable (PC) I and II.
- Police Recruit: The lowest entry point before full constable rank.

This rank structure is provided for in the Police Act and associated regulations. Promotions through these ranks are managed by the Police Service Commission on the recommendation of the Inspector-General of Police Ranks in the Nigeria Police Force in descending order:

== Rwanda ==
Ranks of the Rwanda National Police:

- Corporal
- Sergeant
- Senior sergeant
- Chief sergeant
- Assistant inspector of police
- Inspector of police
- Chief inspector of police
- Superintendent of police
- Senior superintendent of police
- Chief superintendent of police
- Assistant commissioner of police
- Commissioner of police
- Deputy commissioner general of police
- Commissioner general of police

== Senegal ==
Officers

Rank group	General / flag officers			Senior officers			Junior officers
Senegalese Gendarmerie
Senegalese Gendarmerie	Général de corps d'armée	Général de division	Général de brigade	Colonel	Lieutenant-colonel	Commandant	Capitaine	Lieutenant	Sous-lieutenant

Enlisted

Rank group	Senior NCOs					Junior NCOs	Enlisted
Senegalese Gendarmerie
Senegalese Gendarmerie	Adjutant-major	Adjutant-chef	Adjutant	Maréchal des logis-chef	Maréchal des logis		Gendarme

== Somaliland ==
Officers

Rank group	General / flag officers		Senior officers			Junior officers
Somaliland Police
Somaliland Police	Sareeye gaas	Sareeye guuto	Gashaanle sare	Gashaanle dhexe	Gashaanle	Dhamme	Laba xídígle	Xídígle

Enlisted

Rank group	Senior NCOs					Junior NCOs		Enlisted
Somaliland Police
Somaliland Police	Chief warrant officer Musharax sarkaal	Warrant officer class 1 Sadex xarígle	Warrant officer class 2 Laba xarígle	Warrant officer class 3 Xarígle	Sergeant; Sadex alífle	Corporal; Laba alífle	Lance corporal Alífle	Constable; Dable

== South Africa ==
Officers

Rank group	General / flag officers				Senior officers		Junior officers
	Senior management				Commissioned officers
South African Police Service
South African Police Service	General	Lieutenant general	Major general	Brigadier	Colonel	Lieutenant colonel	Captain

Other

Equivalent NATO code	OR-9	OR-7	OR-3
South African Police Service
South African Police Service	Warrant officer	Sergeant	Constable

== Tanzania ==
Gazetted officers

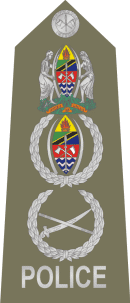
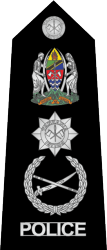
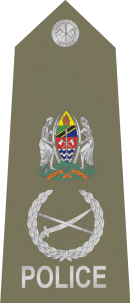
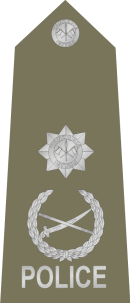
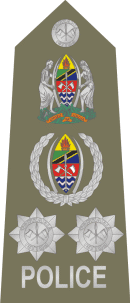
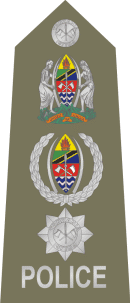
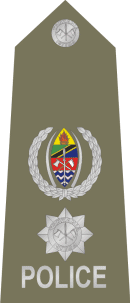
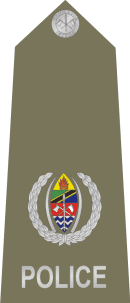
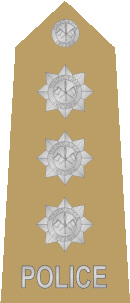
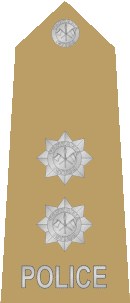
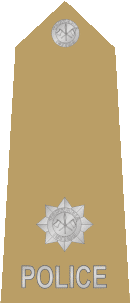
	Inspector general		Commissioner				Superintendent			Inspector
Police of Tanzania
Police of Tanzania	Inspector general of police	Deputy inspector general of police	Commissioner	Deputy commissioner	Senior assistant commissioner	Assistant commissioner	Senior superintendent	Superintendent	Assistant superintendent	Inspector	Assistant inspector

Non gazetted officers

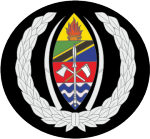
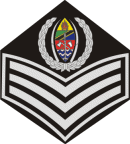
	Sergeant			Other
Police of Tanzania
Police of Tanzania	Sergeant major	Station sergeant	Sergeant	Corporal

== Zimbabwe ==
Commissioned officers

	Commissioner				Superintendent		Inspector
Zimbabwe Republic Police
Zimbabwe Republic Police	Commissioner general	Deputy commissioner general	Commissioner	Assistant commissioner	Chief superintendent	Superintendent	Chief inspector	Inspector

Non-commissioned officers

	Inspector	Sergeant		Constable
Zimbabwe Republic Police
Zimbabwe Republic Police	Assistant inspector	Sergeant major	Sergeant	Constable

== See also ==
- List of police ranks
- List of police ranks in Asia
- List of police ranks in Europe
- List of police ranks in Oceania
- List of police ranks in the Americas
- Military rank
- Fire department ranks by country
- Ranks and insignia of gendarmeries
