= List of police ranks in Oceania =

Element of hierarchy in law enforcement

Police ranks are a system of hierarchical relationships in police organizations. The rank system defines authority and responsibility in a police organization, and affects the culture within the police force. Police ranks, dependent on country, are similar to military ranks in function and design due to policing in many countries developing from military organizations and operations, such as in Western Europe, former Soviet countries, and English-speaking countries. Usually, uniforms denote the bearer's rank by particular insignia affixed to the uniforms.

Rank is not only used to designate leadership, but to establish pay-grade as well. As rank increases, pay-grade follows, but so does the amount of responsibility.

== Australia ==
Example

	Commissioners			Senior officers			Sergeants		Constables				Recruits
Australian Federal Police (ACT Policing)													
Australian Federal Police (ACT Policing)	Commissioner	Deputy commissioner	Assistant commissioner	Commander	Superintendent	Inspector	Station sergeant	Sergeant	Leading senior constable	Senior constable	Constable first class	Constable	Police recruit

== Fiji ==
Fiji Police ranks and insignia
Rank	Commissioner	Deputy commissioner	Assistant commissioner	Senior superintendent	Superintendent	Assistant superintendent	Inspector	Sergeant major	Sergeant	Corporal	Constable
Epaulette insignia											

== New Zealand ==
New Zealand Police ranks and insignia
Rank	Commissioner	Deputy commissioner	Assistant commissioner	Executive superintendent	Superintendent	Inspector	Senior sergeant	Sergeant	Senior constable	Constable	Recruit
Epaulette insignia											

== Niue ==
Niue Police ranks and insignia
Rank	Commissioner / Chief of Police	Inspector	Sergeant	Constable
Epaulette insignia	A commissioner rank slide with crossed swords and a crown above them	An inspector rank slide with 3 pips	A sergeant rank slide with three chevrons	A constable rank slide with no insignia

== Vanuatu ==
Commissioned officers

Rank group	General / flag officers			Senior officers	Junior officers
Vanuatu Police Force
Vanuatu Police Force	Commissioner; Komisna	Deputy commissioner Nambatu Komisna	Assistant commissioner	Superintendent	Chief inspector Jif Inspekta	Senior inspector Long Inspekta	Inspector; Inspekta

Non-commissioned personnel

Rank group	Senior NCOs		Junior NCOs	Enlisted
Vanuatu Police Force
Vanuatu Police Force	Senior sergeant Long Sajen	Sergeant; Sajen	Corporal; Kofol	Constable; Polis	Recruit; Rikrut

== See also ==
- List of police ranks
- List of police ranks in Africa
- List of police ranks in Asia
- List of police ranks in Europe
- List of police ranks in the Americas
- Military rank
- Fire department ranks by country
- Ranks and insignia of gendarmeries
