= List of police ranks in the Americas =

Police ranks are a system of hierarchical relationships in police organizations. The rank system defines authority and responsibility in a police organization, and affects the culture within the police force. Police ranks, dependent on country, are similar to military ranks in function and design due to policing in many countries developing from military organizations and operations, such as in Western Europe, former Soviet countries, and English-speaking countries. Usually, uniforms denote the bearer's rank by particular insignia affixed to the uniforms.

Rank is not only used to designate leadership, but to establish pay-grade as well. As rank increases, pay-grade follows, but so does the amount of responsibility.

== Antigua and Barbuda ==
Royal Police Force of Antigua and Barbuda ranks and insignia
Rank	Commissioner	Deputy commissioner	Assistant commissioner	Superintendent	Assistant superintendent	Inspector	Senior sergeant	Sergeant	Corporal	Constable
Epaulette insignia										

== Argentina ==
=== Argentine Federal Police ===
Officers

Rank group	General / flag officers				Senior officers			Junior officers
Argentine Federal Police
Argentine Federal Police	Comisario general Jefe de la policía federal	Comisario general	Comisario mayor	Comisario inspector	Comisario	Subcomisario	Oficial principal	Oficial inspector	Oficial subinspector	Oficial subayudante	Oficial ayudante

Others

Rank group	Senior NCOs					Junior NCOs		Enlisted
Argentine Federal Police
Argentine Federal Police	Suboficial mayor	Subofical auxiliar	Suboficial escrebiente	Sargento primero	Sargento	Cabo primero	Cabo	Agente

=== Buenos Aires Provincial Police ===
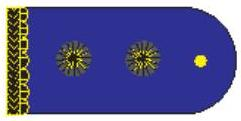
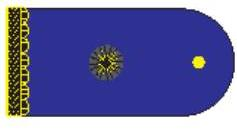
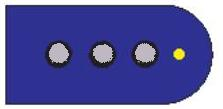
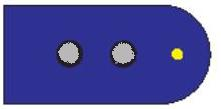
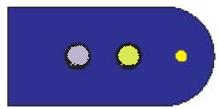
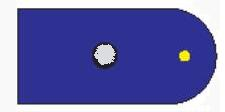
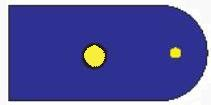
Insignia	Name	English
Command
	Comisario general	Commissioner general
	Comisario mayor	Commissioner major
	Comisario inspector	Commissioner inspector
	Comisario	Commissioner
	Subcomisario	Deputy commissioner
	Oficial principal	Chief officer
	Oficial inspector	Inspector officer
	Oficial subinspector	Deputy inspector officer
	Oficial ayudante	Assistant officer
	Oficial subayudante	Deputy assistant officer
General
	Mayor	Major
	Capitán	Captain
	Teniente 1º	First lieutenant
	Teniente	Lieutenant
	Subteniente	Second lieutenant
	Sargento	Sergeant
	Oficial	Official

== Bermuda ==
Bermuda Police Service ranks and insignia
Rank	Commissioner	Deputy commissioner	Assistant commissioner	Superintendent	Chief inspector	Inspector	Sergeant	Constable
Epaulette insignia								

== Bolivia ==
Officers

Rank group	General / flag officers				Senior officers			Junior officers
	Generales				Jefes			Oficiales
Bolivia
Bolivia	General comandante Commandant general	General supervisor Supervisor general	General superior Superior general	General director Director general	Coronel; Colonel	Teniente coronel Lieutenant colonel	Mayor; Major	Capitan; Captain	Teniente; Lieutenant	Subteniente; Second lieutenant	Cadete

Others

Rank group	Senior NCOs					Junior NCOs		Enlisted
Bolivia
Bolivia	Suboficial supervisor Supervisor warrant officer	Suboficial mayor Warrant officer major	Suboficial primero Warrant officer 1st class	Suboficial segundo Warrant officer 2nd class	Sargento primero Sergeant 1st class	Sargento segundo Sergeant 2nd class	Cabo; Corporal	Policia egresado Graduate policeman

== Brazil ==
Brazil has several different police forces, each with its own ranks. At a federal level, there are the Federal Police (Portuguese: Polícia Federal, the equivalent to the FBI), the Federal Highway Police (Polícia Rodoviária Federal), the Federal Railroad Police (Portuguese: Polícia Ferroviária Federal) and the Federal Penal Police (Portuguese: Polícia Penal Federal). At a state level, there are the Military Police (Polícia Militar, ostensive/preventive, a gendarmerie type force unlike the military police of many other countries, the Brazilian equivalent of which is the army police), the Civil Police (Polícia Civil, investigative) and the State Penal Police (Portuguese: Polícia Penal Estadual). At city level, there is the Municipal Guards (Guarda Civil Municipal/Guarda Civil Metropolitana).

=== Civil police ===
The Brazilian Civil Police rank follows, from higher to lower, as:

- Comissário/Delegado (Commissioner/Delegate)
- Escrivão (Clerk)
- Agente/Investigador/Inspetor/Especialista (Agent/Investigator/Inspector/Specialist)
- Perito criminal (Forensics expert)

=== Military police ===
The following details the ranks of the military police, which are also used by the National Public Security Force.

The ranks are valid for the state military police agencies (such as the Military Police of Minas Gerais, São Paulo, and Rio de Janeiro) and are listed, respectively, from higher to lower ranks:

Commanders

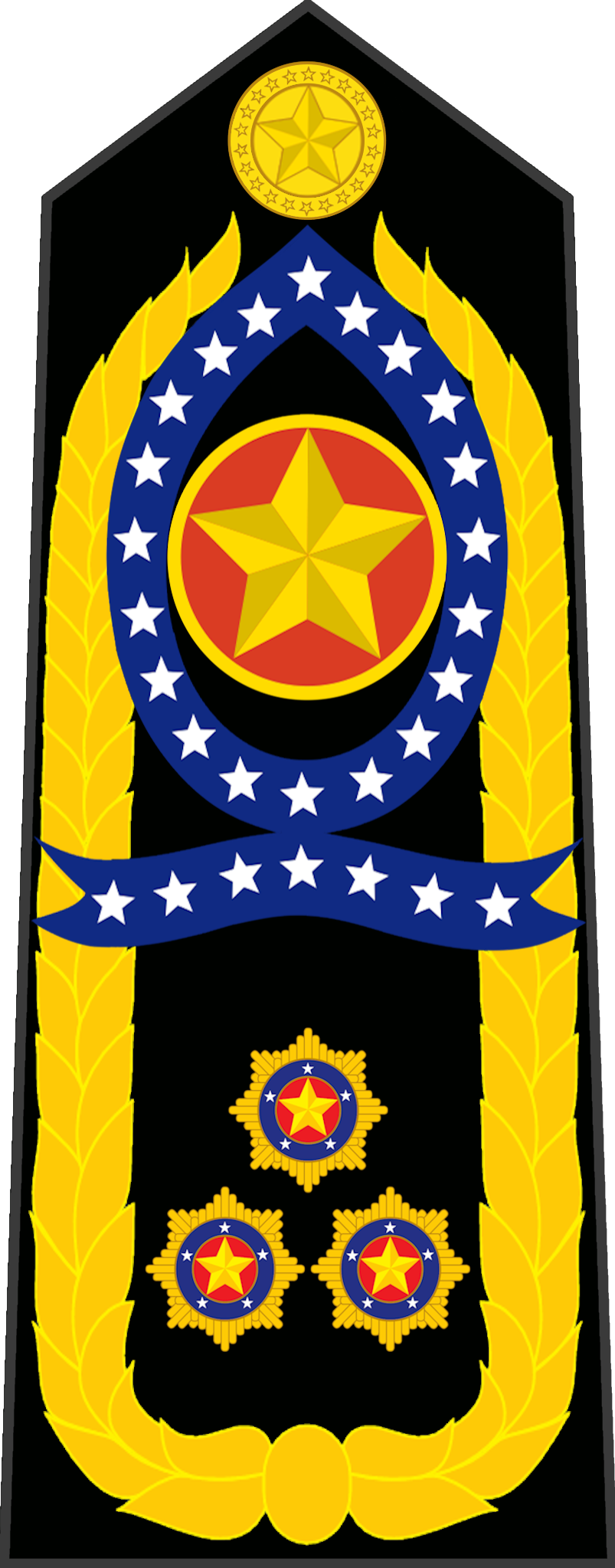
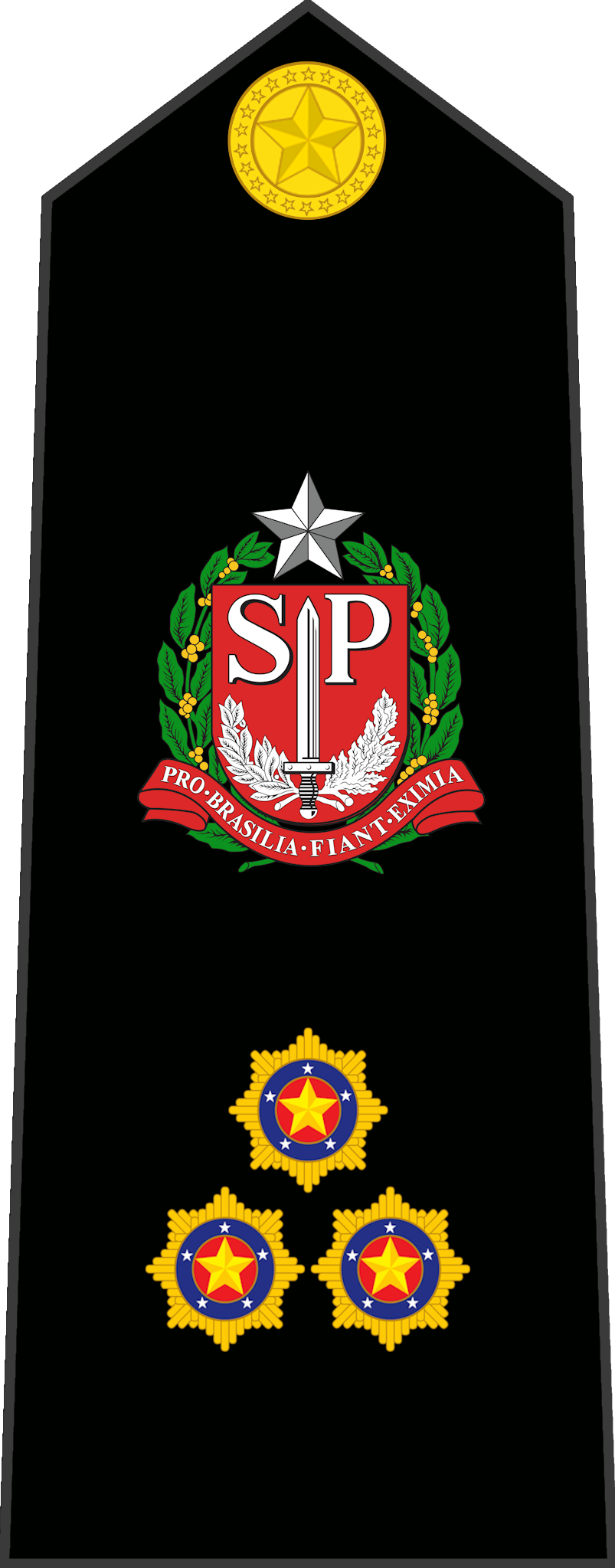
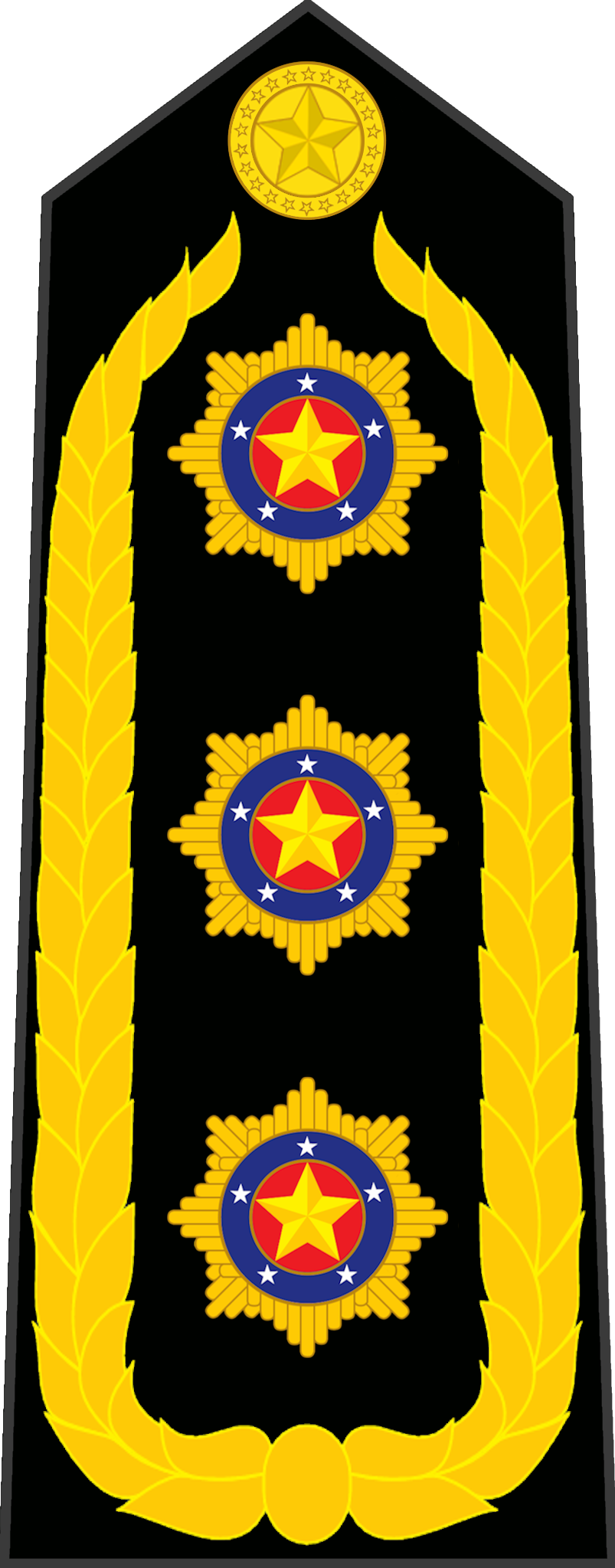
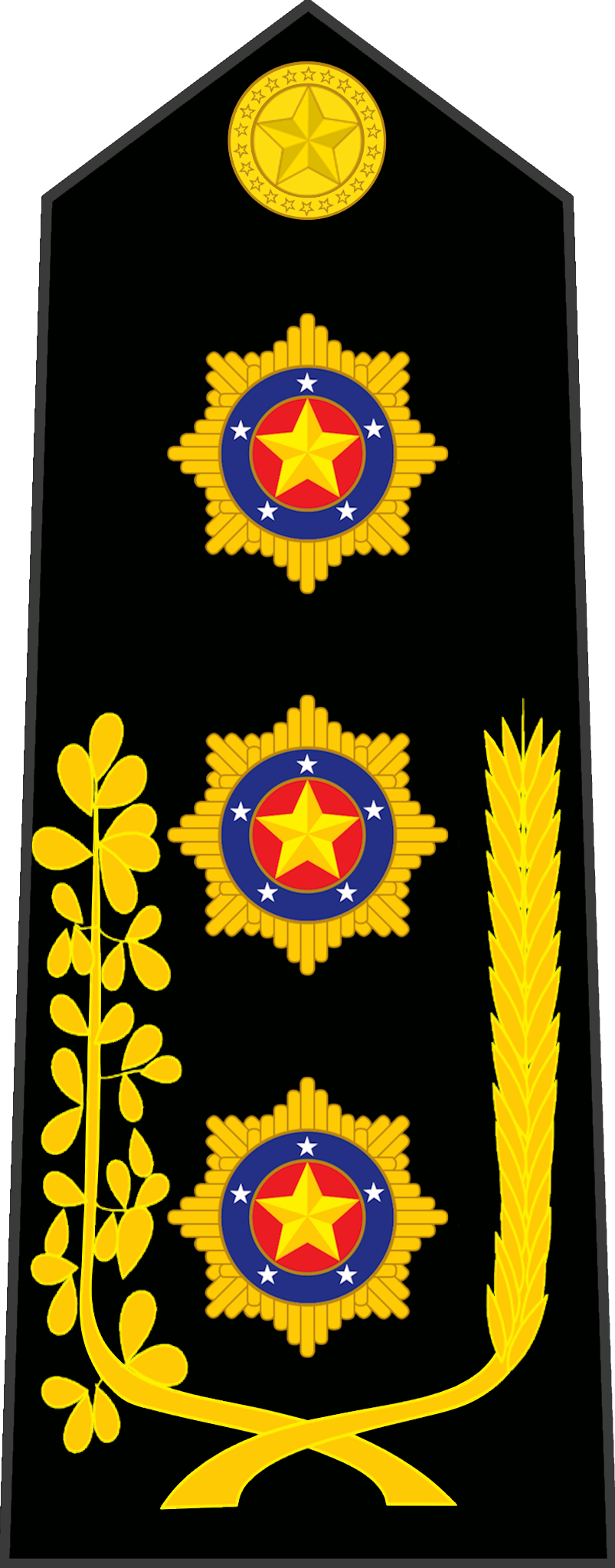
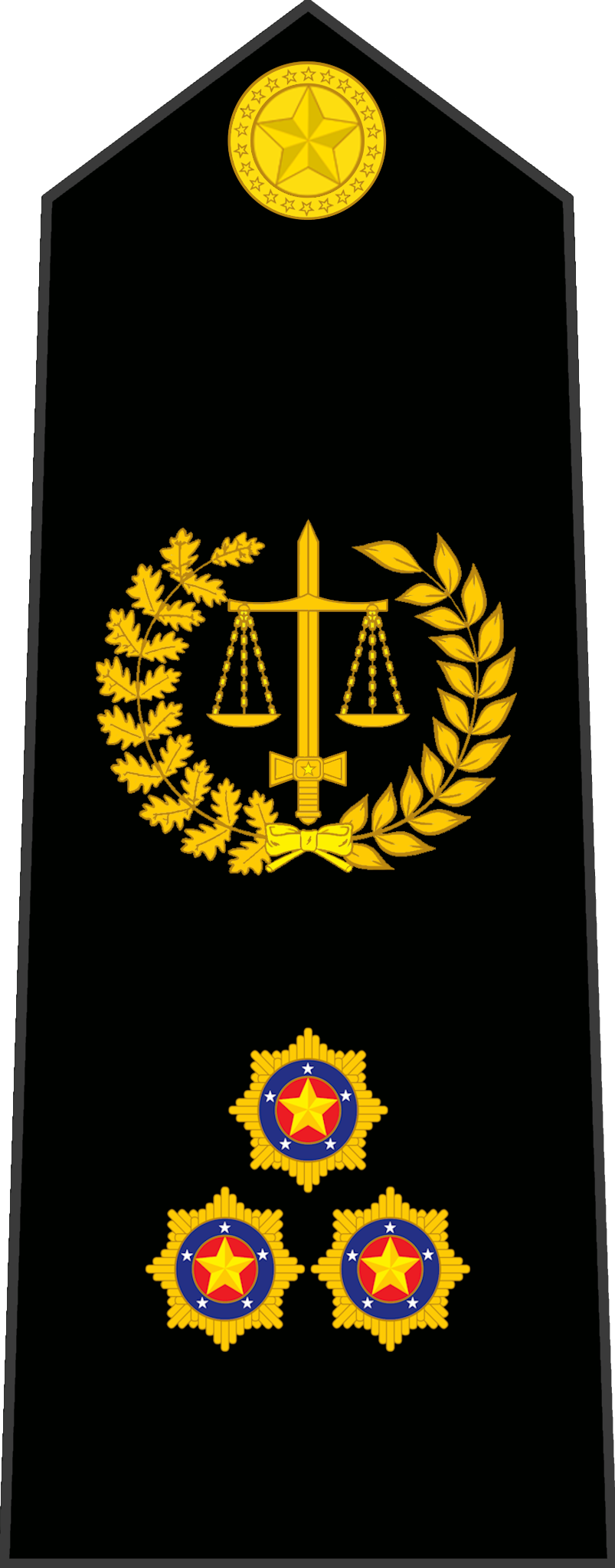
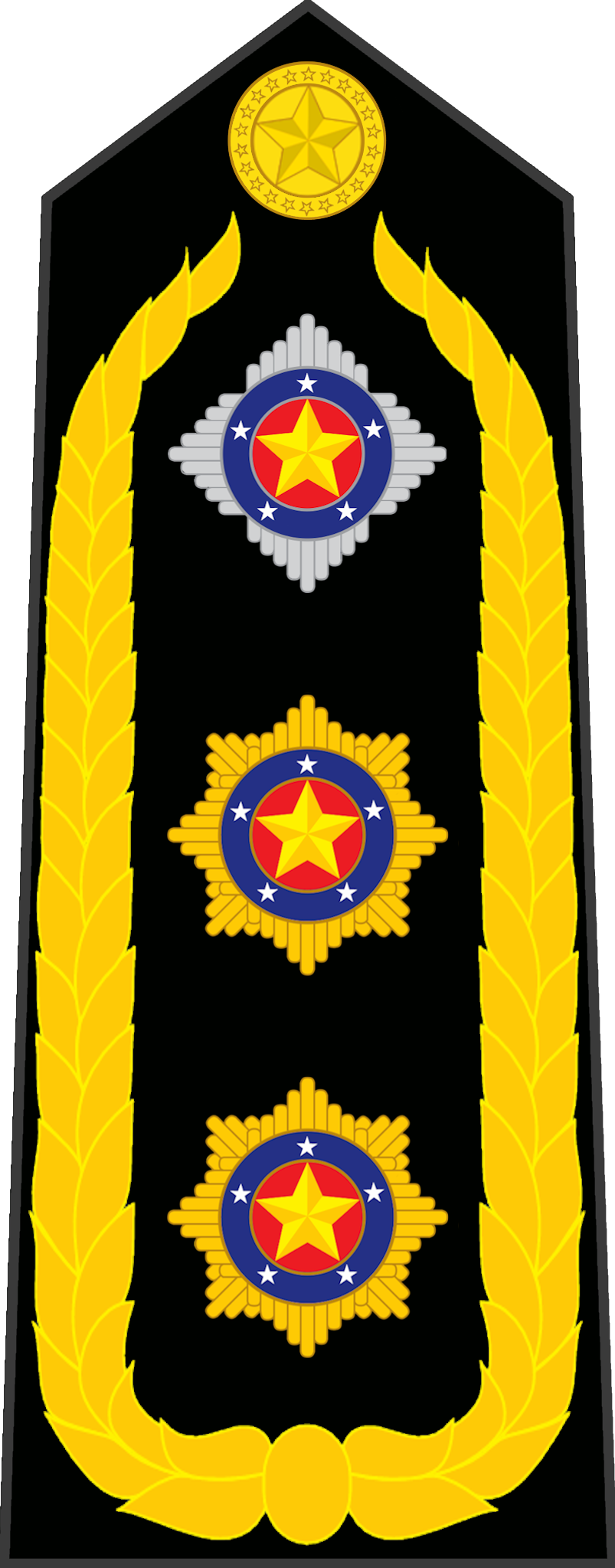
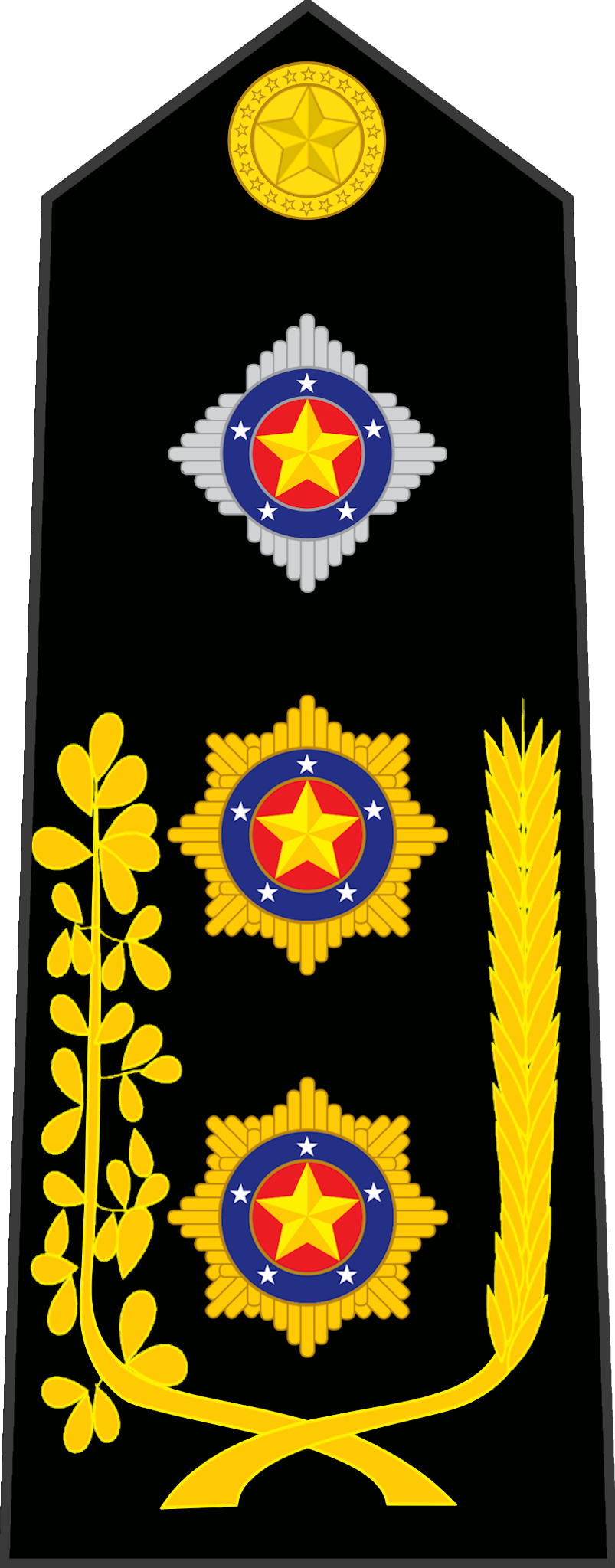
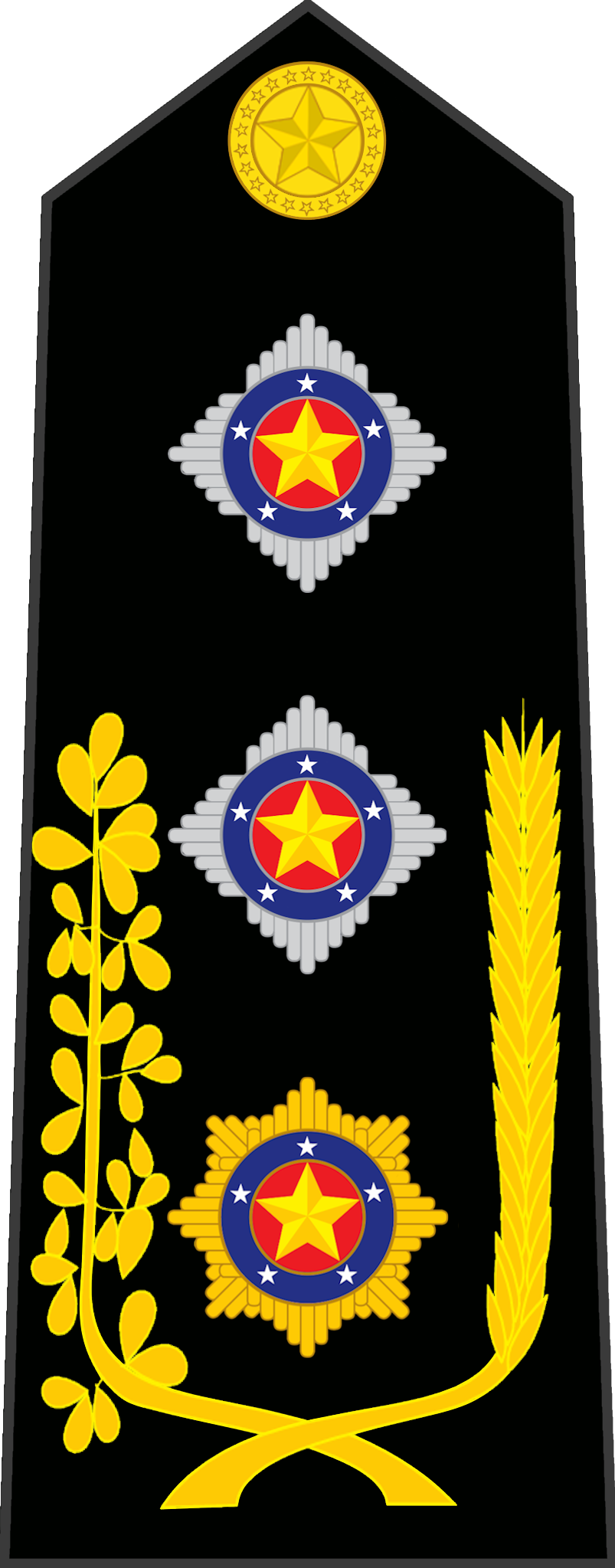
Rank	Colonel					Lieutenant colonel	Major
Brazilian Military Police
Brazilian Military Police	Comandante geral	Governor military cabinet chief (SP)	Deputy general commande	Chief of Staff	Colonel in the role of military court judge	Governor military cabinet chief/ Interim	Governor military cabinet chief

Officers

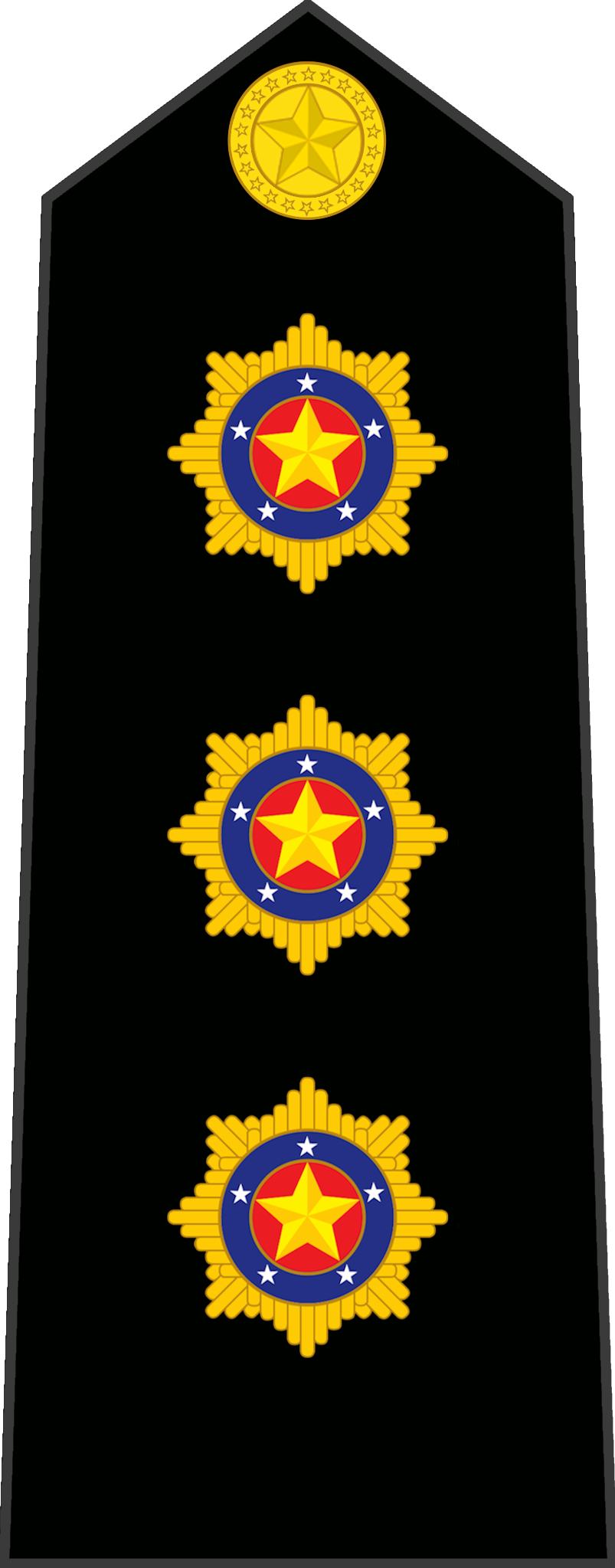
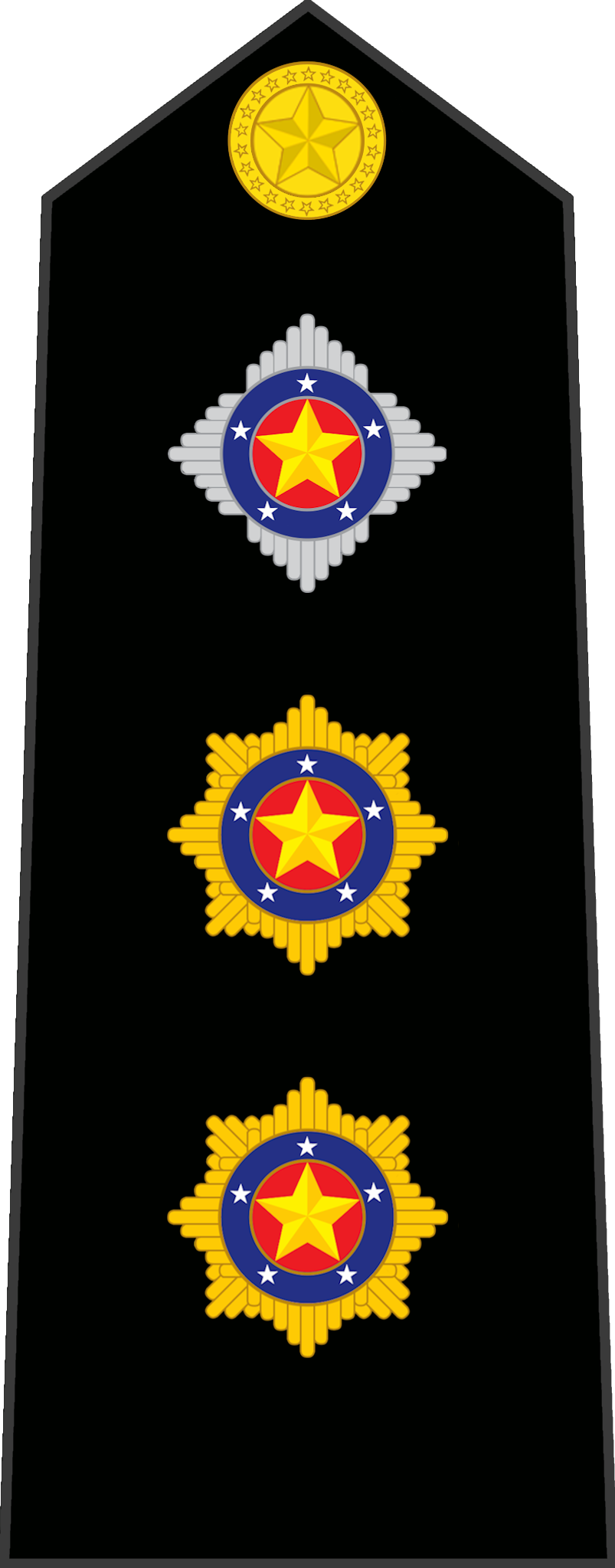
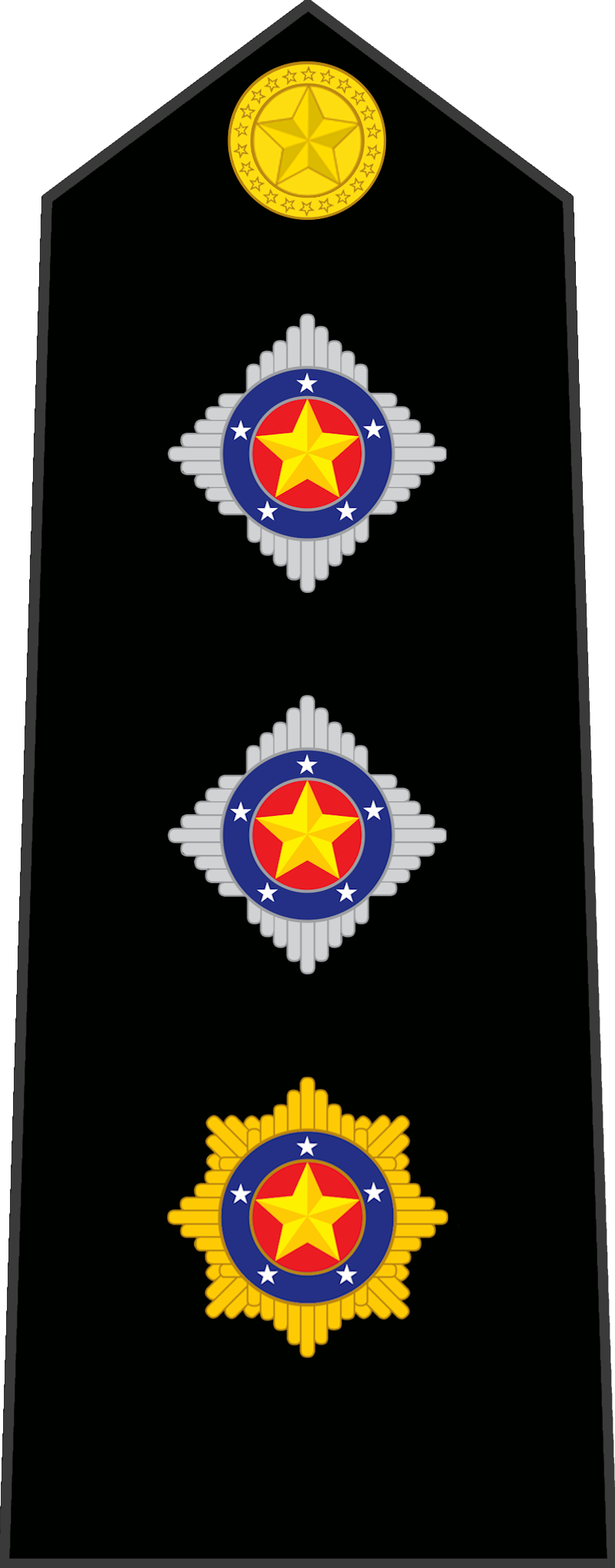
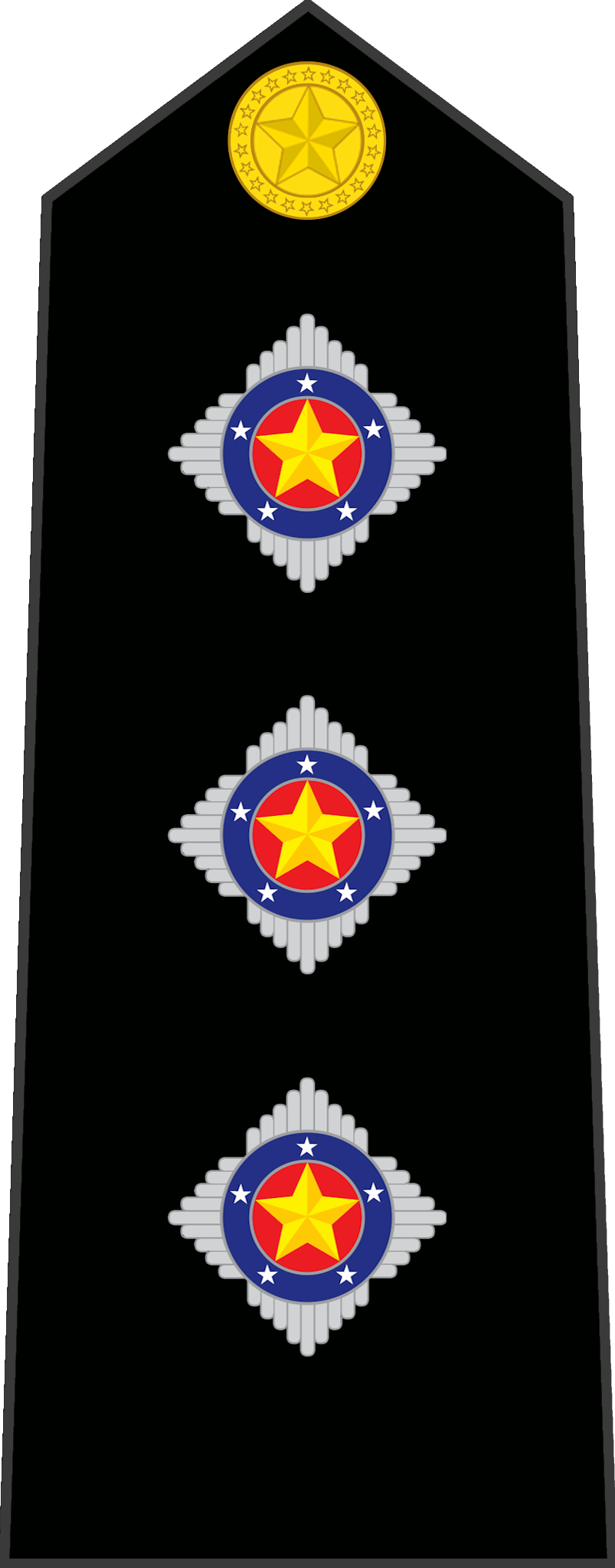
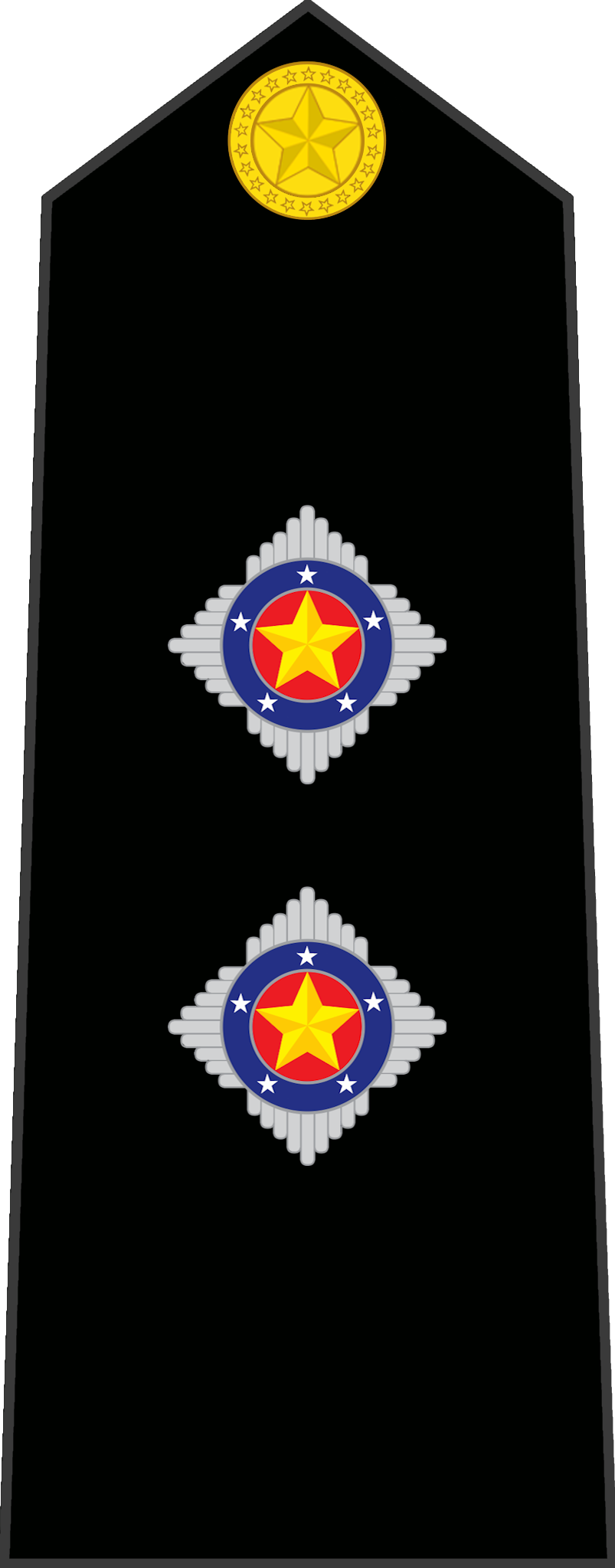
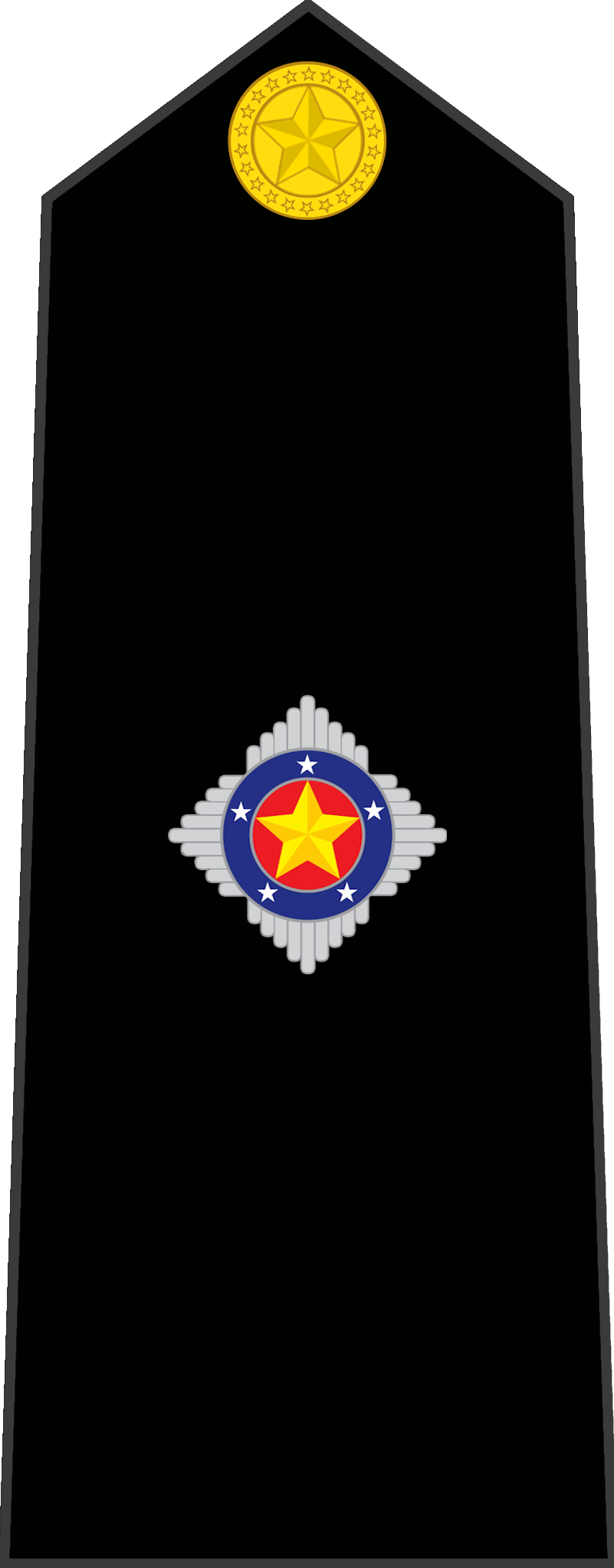
Rank group	General / flag officers	Senior officers			Junior officers
Brazilian Military Police
Brazilian Military Police		Coronel	Tenente-coronel	Major	Capitão	Primeiro tenente	Segundo tenente

Student Officers

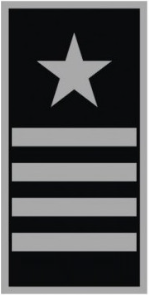
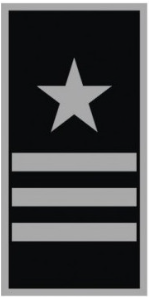
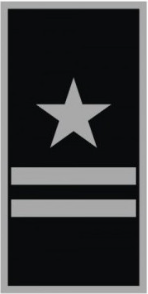
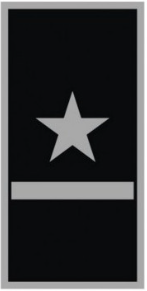
Rank group	Junior officer	Student officer/Cadets
Rank group	Junior officer	5th year	4th year	3rd year	2nd year	1st year
Brazilian Military Police
Brazilian Military Police	Aspirante a oficial		Aluno-oficial 4° ano (APMBB)	Aluno-oficial 3° ano (APMBB)	Aluno-oficial 2° ano (APMBB)	Aluno-oficial 1° ano (APMBB)

Others

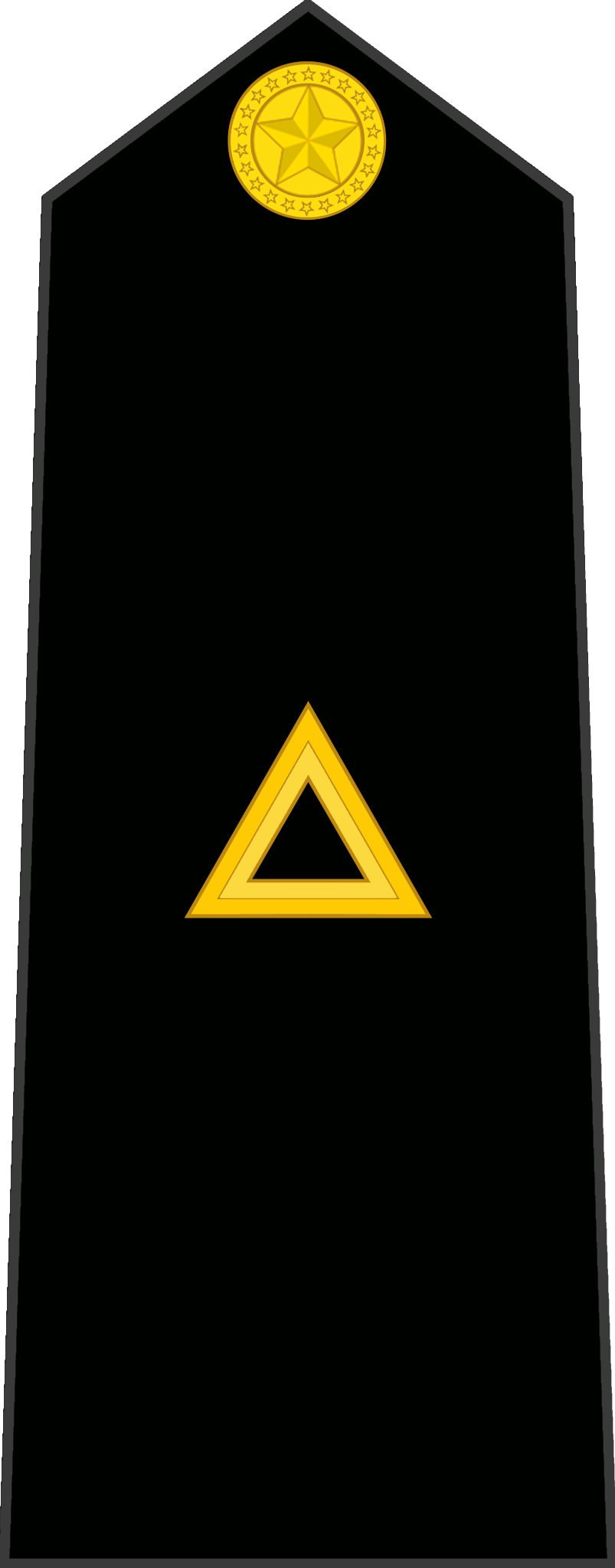
Rank group	Senior NCOs				Junior NCOs	Enlisted
Brazilian Military Police
Brazilian Military Police	Subtenente	Primeiro-sargento	Segundo-sargento	Terceiro-sargento	Cabo	Soldado primeira classe	Soldado segunda classe

Student NCOs

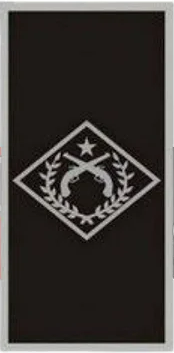
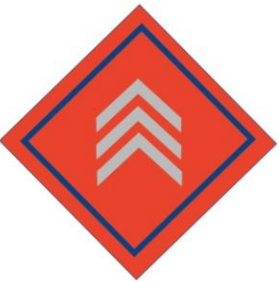
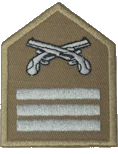
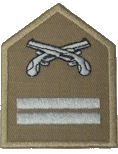
Rank group	Sargeants candidates			Corporal candidates	Soldier candidates
Brazilian Military Police
Brazilian Military Police	Aluno-Sargento (Essgt) (SP)	Aluno-Sargento (ES)	Aluno-Sargento (SC)	Aluno-Cabo (SC)

== Canada ==
While some smaller or area specific police forces (ports, docks, tunnels etc.) may use variations on, or fewer of, these ranks, most territorial police forces and special police forces have a standard set of operational ranks based on either of the two systems shown here:

=== Royal Canadian Mounted Police ===
Officers

	Commissioner			Superintendent		Inspector
Royal Canadian Mounted Police
Royal Canadian Mounted Police	Commissioner; Commissaire	Deputy commissioner Sous-commissaire	Assistant commissioner Commissaire adjoint	Chief superintendent Surintendant principal	Superintendent; Surintendant	Inspector; Inspecteur

Others

	Non-commissioned officers						Constables	Depot
Royal Canadian Mounted Police							No insignia
Royal Canadian Mounted Police	Corps sergeant major	Sergeant major	Staff sergeant major	Staff sergeant	Sergeant	Corporal	Constable	Cadet
Royal Canadian Mounted Police	Sergent-major du corps	Sergent-major	Sergent-major d'état major	Sergent d'état-major	Sergent	Caporal	Gendarme	Cadet

=== Royal Newfoundland Constabulary ===
Commanding officers		Senior officers		Police officers			Officers in training
Chief constable	Deputy chief	Superintendent	Inspector	Staff sergeant	Sergeant	Constable	Cadet

=== Sûreté du Québec ===
Ranks of Sûreté du Québec
General staff officers		Officers				Sub-officers	Agents	
Directeur general	Directeur adjoint	Inspecteur chef	Inspecteur	Capitaine	Lieutenant	Sergent	Chef d'équipe	Agent
Director general of the SQ	Associate director	Chief inspector	Inspector	Captain	Lieutenant	Sergeant	Team leader	Constable
								No insignia

=== Service de Police de la Ville de Montréal ===
Rank Group	Executive Officers		Staff Officers			Superior Officers	Officers	Constables
SPVM
SPVM	Directeur; Director	Directeur-adjoint; Associate Director	Inspecteur-chef; Chief Inspector	Inspecteur; Inspector	Commandant; Commander	Lieutenant; Lieutenant	Sergent; Sergeant	Agent sénior Senior Constable	Agent; Constable

== Chile ==
These are the ranks used by Chilean police services.

Investigations Police of Chile (PDI) officers

- Director general
- Prefecto general
- Prefecto inspector
- Prefecto
- Subprefecto
- Comisario
- Subcomisario
- Inspector
- Subinspector
- Detective
- Aspirante

Since 2017 this agency has rank insignia.

=== Carabineros de Chile ===
Officers

Rank group	General / flag officers			Senior officers			Junior officers
Carabineros de Chile
Carabineros de Chile	General director	General inspector	General	Coronel	Teniente coronel	Mayor	Capitán	Teniente	Subteniente
Abbr.	GNRL DIR	GNRL INS	GNRL	CRNL	TTE CRNL	MAY	CAP	TTE		SUB TTE

Non-commissioned officers and enlisted

Rank group	Senior NCOs				Junior NCOs		Enlisted
	Warrant officers	NCOs		Enlisted				Students
Carabineros de Chile								No insignia
Carabineros de Chile	Suboficial mayor	Suboficial	Sargento primero	Sargento segundo	Cabo primero	Cabo segundo	Carabinero	Carabinero alumno
Abbr.	SOM	SuboF	SG1	SG2	CBO1	CBO2	Carab

== Colombia ==
Officers

Rank group	General / flag officers			Senior officers			Junior officers
National Police of Colombia
National Police of Colombia	General	Mayor General	Brigadier General	Coronel	Teniente Coronel	Mayor	Capitán	Teniente	Subteniente
Abbreviation	GEN	MG	BG	COL	LTC	MAJ	CPT	LT	SLT
Abbreviation in Spanish	GN	MG	BG	CR	TC	MY	CT	TE	ST

Non-commissioned officers and enlisted

Rank group	Senior NCOs				Junior NCOs		Enlisted
National Police of Colombia								No insignia
National Police of Colombia	Sargento Mayor	Sargento Primero	Sargento Vice Primero	Sargento Segundo	Cabo Primero	Cabo Segundo	Dragoneante	Agente
National Police of Colombia								No insignia
National Police of Colombia	Comisario	Subcomisario	Intendente Jefe	Intendente	Subintendente	Patrullero	Dragoneante	Agente

== Guatemala ==
	Directors			Senior officers
Policía Nacional Civil
Policía Nacional Civil	Director general	Director general adjunto	Subdirector	Comisario general	Comisario	Subcomisario

	Junior officers			Basic policemen
Policía Nacional Civil
Policía Nacional Civil	Oficial I	Oficial II	Oficial III	Inspector	Subinspector	Agente

== Mexico ==
According to the General Law for the National System for Public Security, the federal, state and municipal police forces are mandated to have the same hierarchical organization. In addition, the national guard uses its own rank system.

=== National guard ===
The national guard was formed by absorbing units and officers from the federal police, military police, and naval police.

Commissioned officers

Rank group	General / flag officers			Senior officers			Junior officers
	Commissioners general			Inspectors			Officers
Mexican National Guard
Mexican National Guard	Comisario General	Comisario Jefe	Comisario	Inspector General	Inspector Jefe	Inspector	Subinspector Primero	Subinspector Segundo	Oficial	Suboficial

Basic scale ladder

Rank group	Senior NCOs		Junior NCOs	Enlisted
Mexican National Guard
Mexican National Guard	Agente Mayor	Agente	Subagente	Guardia Nacional

=== Yucatán State Police ===
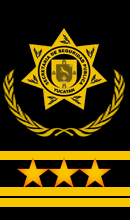
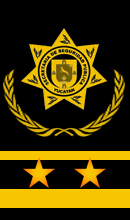
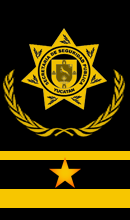
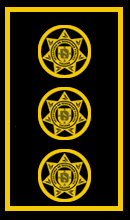
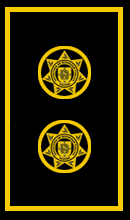
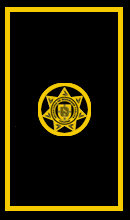
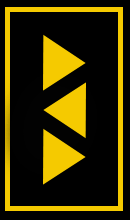
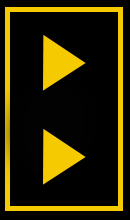
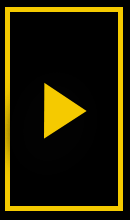
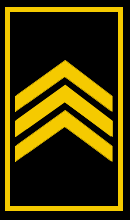
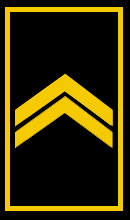
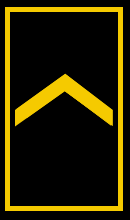
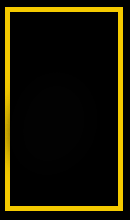
	High-command			Inspectors			Officers			Basic ranks
Yucatán State Police
Yucatán State Police	Secretary/chief	Undersecretary	Director	1st inspector	2nd inspector	Subinspector	1st officer	2nd officer	Subofficer	First police	Second police	Third police	Police

== Nicaragua ==
Officers

Rank group	General / flag officers		Senior officers			Junior officers
	Oficiales generales		Oficiales superiores			Oficiales subalternos
National Police of Nicaragua
National Police of Nicaragua	Primer comisionado	Comisionado general	Comisionado mayor	Comisionado	Sub-comisionado	Capitán	Teniente primero	Inspector

Others

	Ejecutivos
National Police of Nicaragua
National Police of Nicaragua	Sub-inspector	Sub-oficial mayor	Sub-oficial	Policía

== Panama ==
Commissioned officer ranks

Rank group	General / flag officers		Senior officers			Junior officers
(Panama) Panamanian National Police
(Panama) Panamanian National Police	Comisionado Mayor	Subcomisionado Mayor	Comisionado	Subcomisionado	Mayor	Capitán	Teniente	Subteniente

Other ranks

Rank group	Senior NCOs		Junior NCOs		Enlisted
(Panama) Panamanian National Police					No insignia
(Panama) Panamanian National Police	Sargento primero	Sargento segundo	Cabo primero	Cabo segundo	Agente

== Paraguay ==
Officers

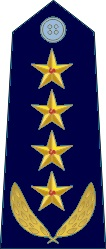
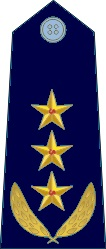
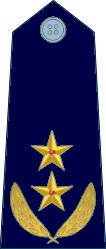
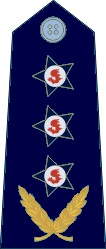
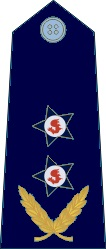
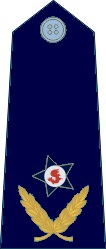
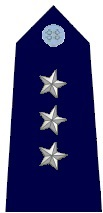
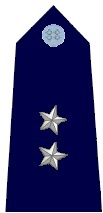
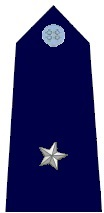
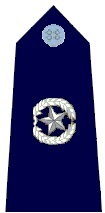
Rank group	General / flag officers			Senior officers			Junior officers
	Superior officers			Chief officers			Junior officers
Paraguay
Paraguay	Comisario general comandante	Comisario director	Comisario general inspector	Comisario principal	Comisario	Subcomisario	Oficial inspector	Oficial primero	Oficial segundo	Oficial ayudante

Others

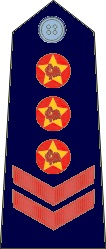
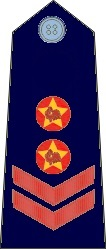
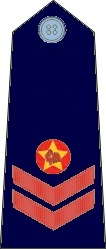
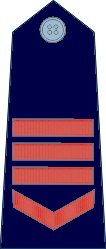
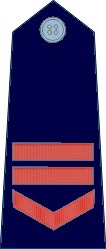
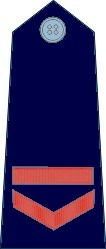
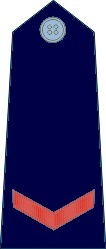
	Chief non-commissioned officers			Junior non-commissioned officers
Paraguay
Paraguay	Sub oficial superior	Sub oficial principal	Sub oficial mayor	Sub oficial inspector	Sub oficial primero	Sub oficial segundo	Sub oficial ayudante

== Peru ==
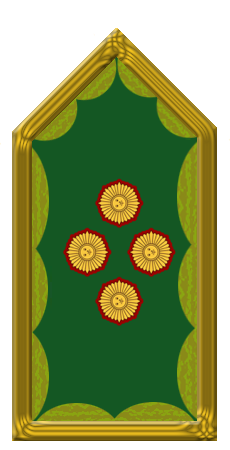
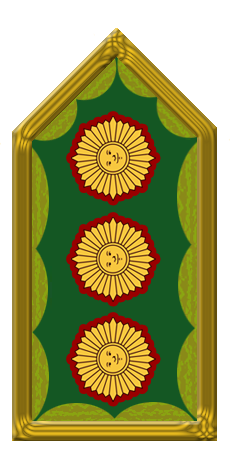
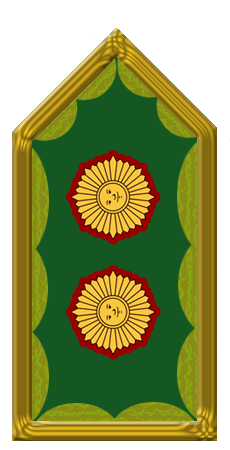
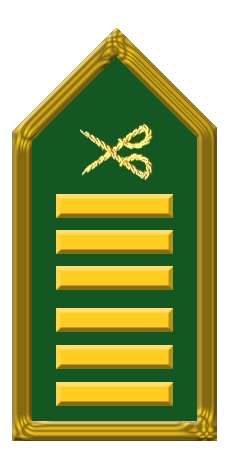
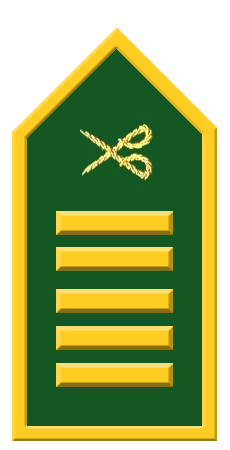
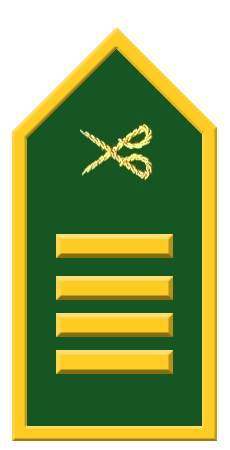
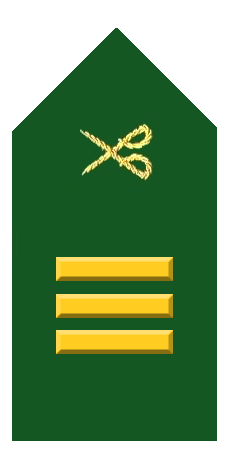
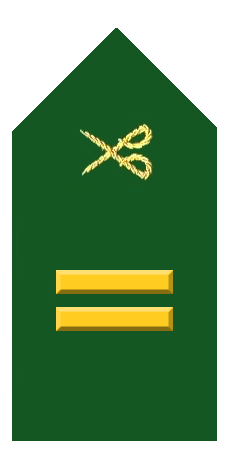
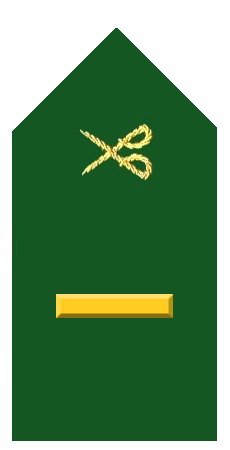
Rank group	General / flag officers			Senior officers			Junior officers
National Police of Peru
National Police of Peru	General de policía	Teniente general	General	Coronel	Comandante	Mayor	Capitán	Teniente	Alférez

Rank group	Warrant officers
National Police of Peru
National Police of Peru	Suboficial Técnico Superior	Suboficial Técnico Brigadier	Suboficial Técnico Primero	Suboficial Técnico Segundo	Suboficial Técnico Tercero

Rank group	Senior NCOs			Junior NCOs	Enlisted
National Police of Peru
National Police of Peru	Suboficial primero	Suboficial segundo	Suboficial tercero

== United States ==
The United States law enforcement ranking model is generally quasi-military in structure. Each level of law enforcement (federal, state, and local) has its own rank structure and insignia, and these vary considerably from agency to agency. There is no nationally set law enforcement rank and insignia structure but they tend to follow similar patterns. Because of that, this is not an exhaustive list. Some departments, particularly small ones, have very few ranks, while large ones have ranks as extensive as United States military rank structures.

=== Federal ===
The U.S. Department of Justice and the U.S. Department of Homeland Security (DHS) contain multiple law enforcement agencies and are the largest federal departments responsible for law enforcement; however, other governmental departments and agencies have law enforcement bodies. Each federal law enforcement agency has a unique rank structure. Many federal law enforcement agencies rank structures resemble military rank structure but have different cogitations regarding responsibilities and duties. In general, all law enforcement groups in United States follow a similar pattern: director/chief, assistant/deputy director/chief, special agent in charge, assistant special agent in charge, supervisory special agent, special agent.

Examples of federal police ranks in the United States include:

FEDERAL BUREAU OF INVESTIGATION(the principal federal law enforcement agency of the United States)
Rank	Director	Deputy Director	Chief of Staff and Special Counsel to the Director	Deputy Chief of Staff	Associate Deputy Director	Executive Assistant Director	Associate Executive Assistant Director	Assistant Director	Deputy Assistant Director	Special Agent-in-Charge	Assistant Special Agent-in-Charge	Supervisory Special Agent	Senior Special Agent	Special Agent	Agent In Training

UNITED STATES COAST GUARD(the principal law enforcement agency of the United States responsible for maritime security)Commissioned officer grade structure of the United States Coast Guard
US DoD Pay Grade	O-10	O-9	O-8	O-7	O-6	O-5	O-4	O-3	O-2	O-1
NATO Code	OF-9	OF-8	OF-7	OF-6	OF-5	OF-4	OF-3	OF-2	OF-1
Insignia
Title	Admiral	Vice admiral	Rear admiral	Rear admiral (lower half)	Captain	Commander	Lieutenant commander	Lieutenant	Lieutenant (junior grade)	Ensign
Abbreviation	ADM	VADM	RADM	RDML	CAPT	CDR	LCDR	LT	LTJG	ENS

UNITED STATES BORDER PATROL(a law enforcement agency responsible for continental security)
Rank	Chief of the Border Patrol	Deputy Chief of the Border Patrol	Chief Patrol Agent	Deputy Chief Patrol Agent	Assistant Chief Patrol Agent; Patrol agent in charge	Deputy Patrol Agent in Charge; Watch commander	Special Operations Supervisor	Supervisory Border Patrol Agent	Border Patrol Agent (sector programs)	Border Patrol Agent
Insignia										No insignia

FEDERAL AIR MARSHAL SERVICE(a law enforcement agency responsible for aviation security)
Director	Deputy Director	Assistant Director	Deputy Assistant Director	Supervisory Air Marshal in Charge	Deputy Supervisory Air Marshal in Charge	Assistant Supervisory Air Marshal in Charge	Supervisory Federal Air Marshal	Senior Federal Air Marshal	Federal Air Marshal

=== State ===
State law enforcement agencies often have a pronounced paramilitary rank structure with rank titles such as: colonel, lieutenant colonel, major, captain, lieutenant, staff sergeant, sergeant, corporal, trooper.

Example
Alabama Highway Patrol and Alabama Department of Public Safety

Rank	Director (colonel)	Assistant Director (lieutenant colonel)	Chief (major)	Captain	Lieutenant	Sergeant	Corporal	Senior Trooper	Trooper
Insignia								No insignia	

=== County ===
County sheriffs are usually elected, chiefs of county police departments are appointed. In a sheriff's department common ranks are undersheriff, assistant sheriff (large departments), senior deputy sheriff, and deputy sheriff, while in a county police department paramilitary titles may be used, which also are to be found in large sheriff's departments.

Example of a sheriff's department
Santa Clara County, California

Rank	Sheriff	Undersheriff	Assistant Sheriff	Captain	Lieutenant	Sergeant	Deputy Sheriff
Insignia							No insignia

Example of a county police department
Anne Arundel County, Maryland

Rank	Chief of police	Assistant Chief	Major	Captain	Lieutenant	Sergeant	Corporal	Police Officer First Class	Police Officer
Insignia									No insignia

=== Municipal/city ===
Municipal or city police departments can use paramilitary ranks or more distinct police ranks, or a combination of both. Commissioners or chiefs are normally heading the departments, aided by commanders and inspectors or colonels or majors. Captain, lieutenant and sergeant are standard ranks. Below them are corporals, detectives, police officers.

Example of a city police department
Aurora Police Department, Colorado

Rank	Chief of Police	Deputy Chief	Division Chief	Commander	Captain	Lieutenant	Sergeant	Police Agent	Police Officer Specialist	Police Officer
Insignia										No insignia

== Uruguay ==
=== National Police of Uruguay ===
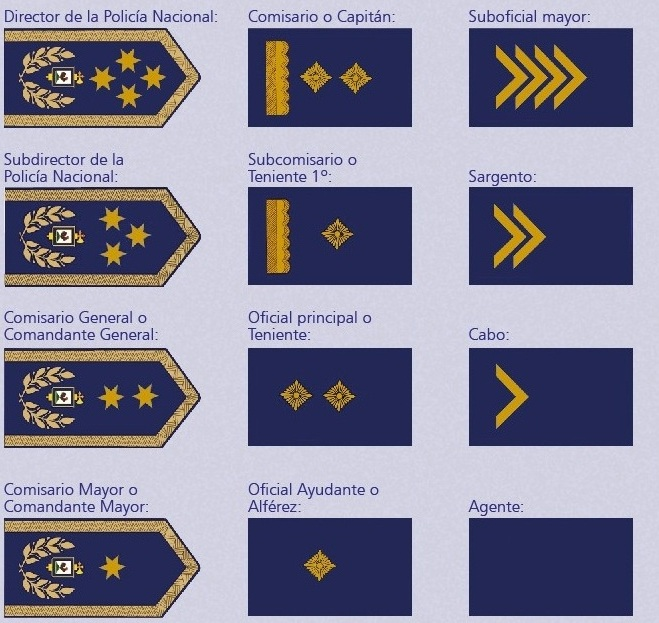
Ranks to the left: Police; to the right: Regiment of Republican Guards.

== Venezuela ==
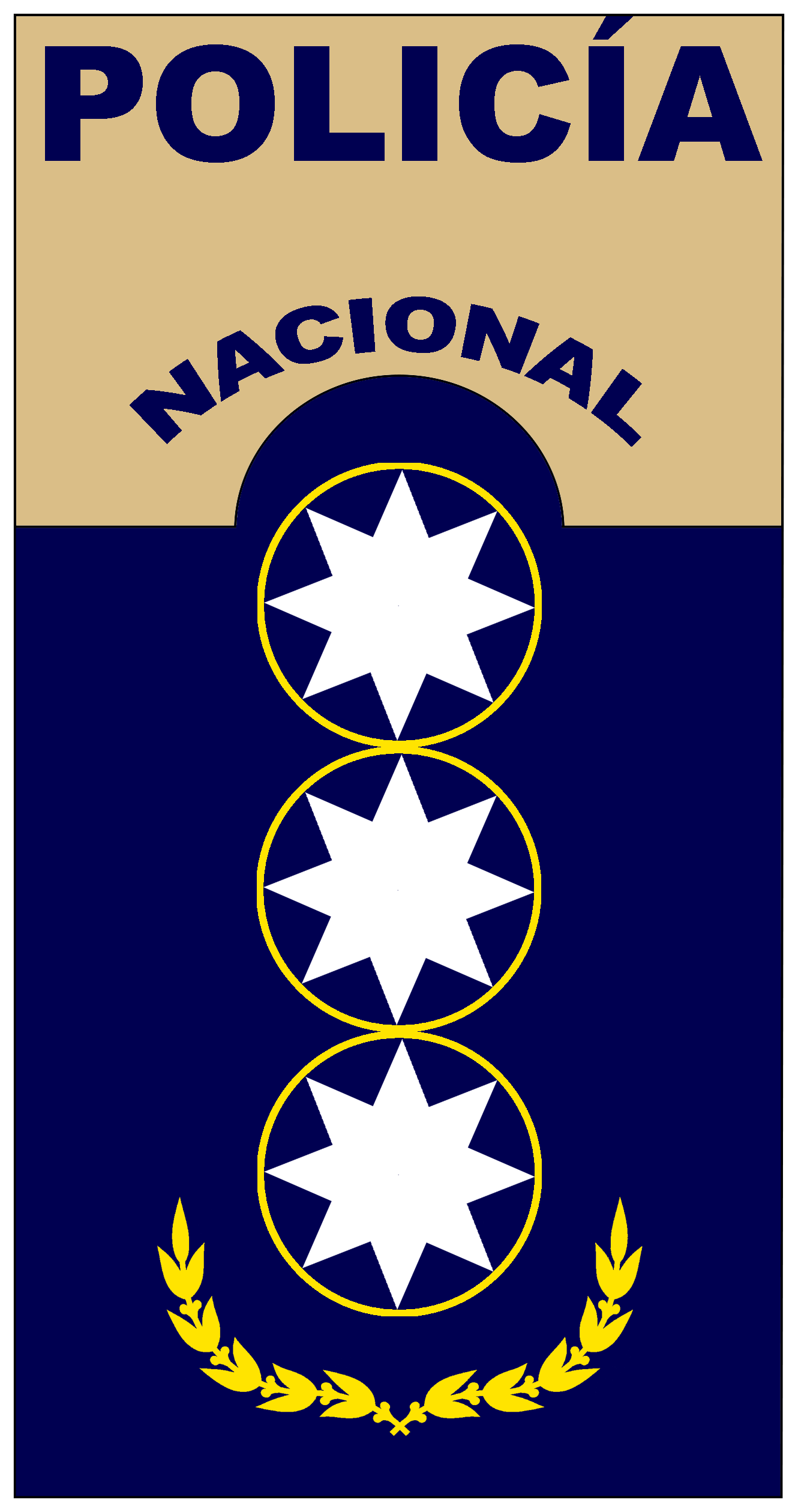
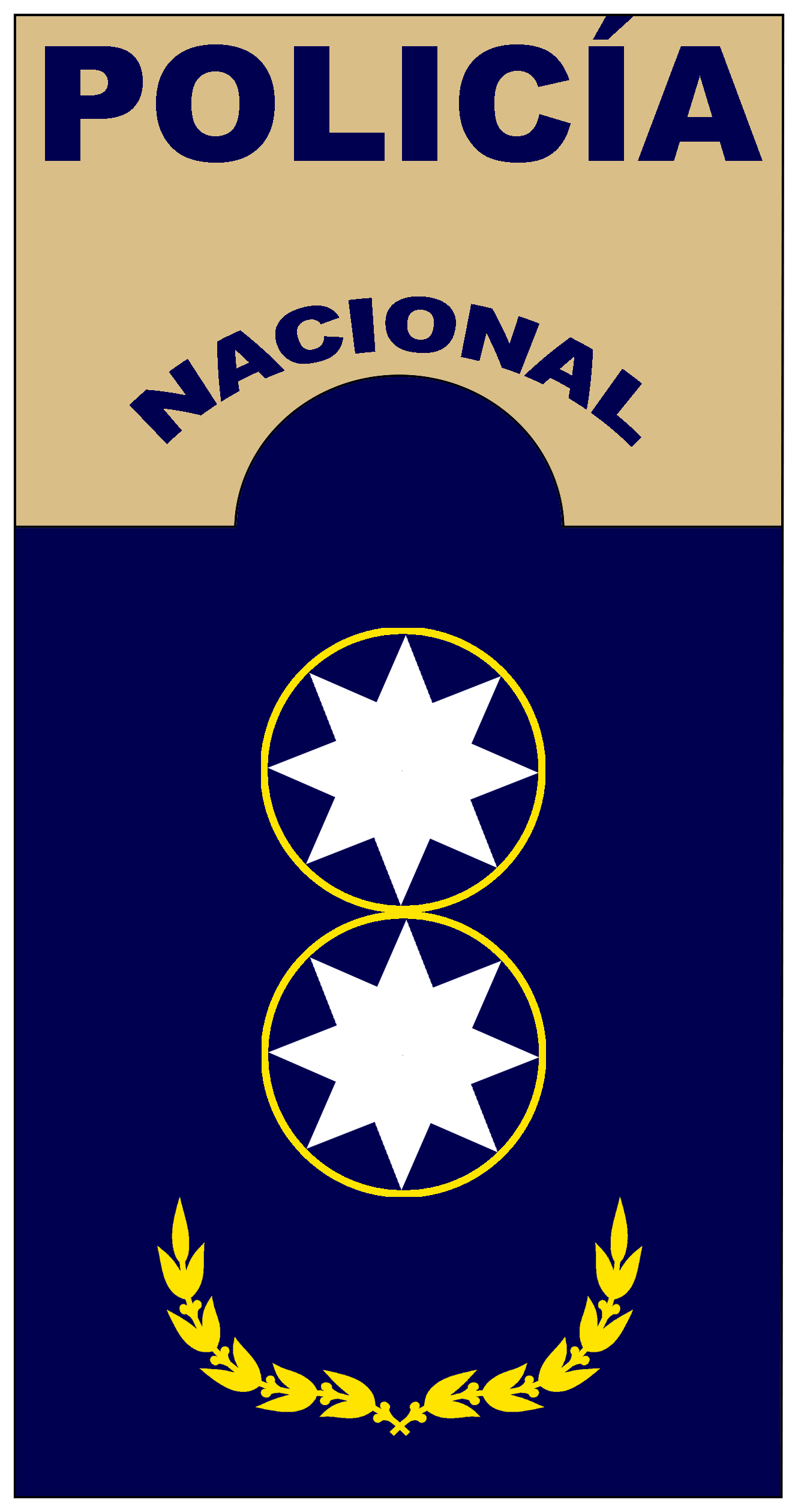
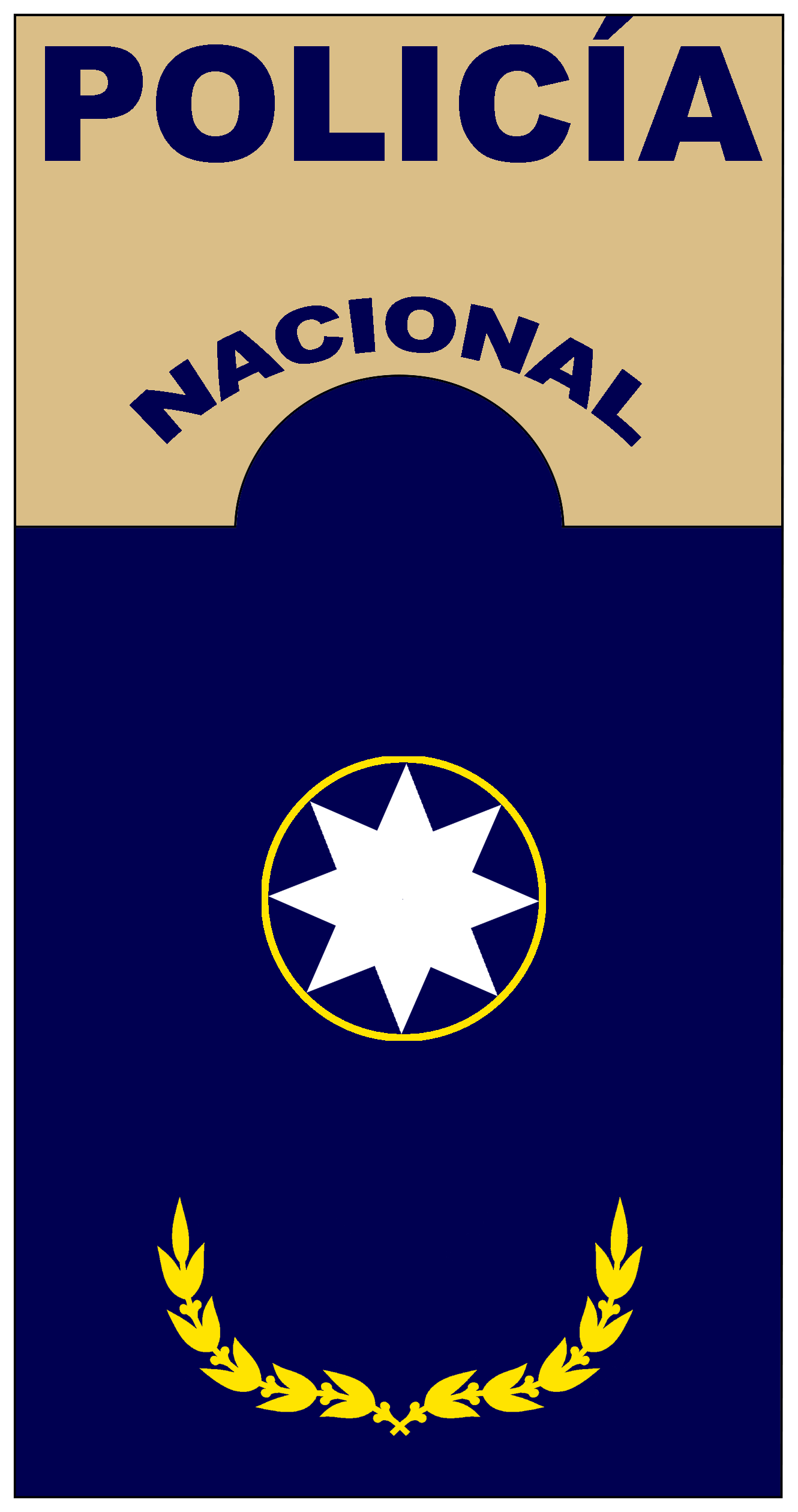
	Nivel Alta Direccion		Nivel Estratégico				Nivel Táctico			Nivel Operativo
Venezuelan National Police
Venezuelan National Police	Comisario Superior	Comisario Mayor	Comisario General	Comisario Jefe	Primer Comisario	Comisario	Inspector Jefe	Primer Inspector	Inspector	Oficial Jefe	Primer Oficial	Oficial

Bolivarian National Guard of Venezuela

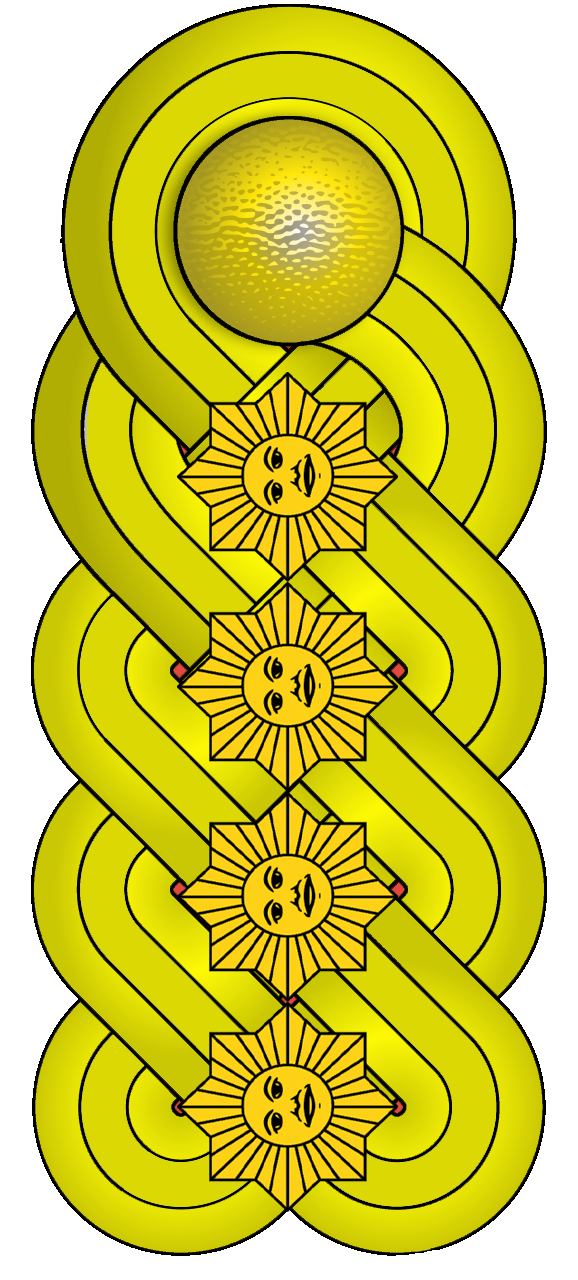
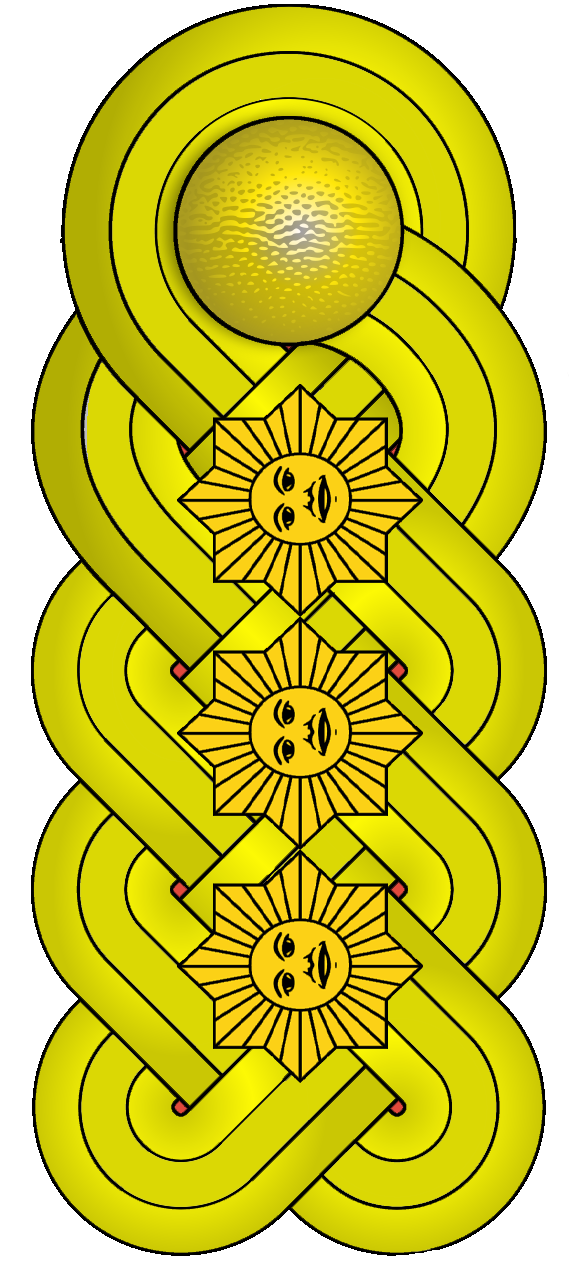
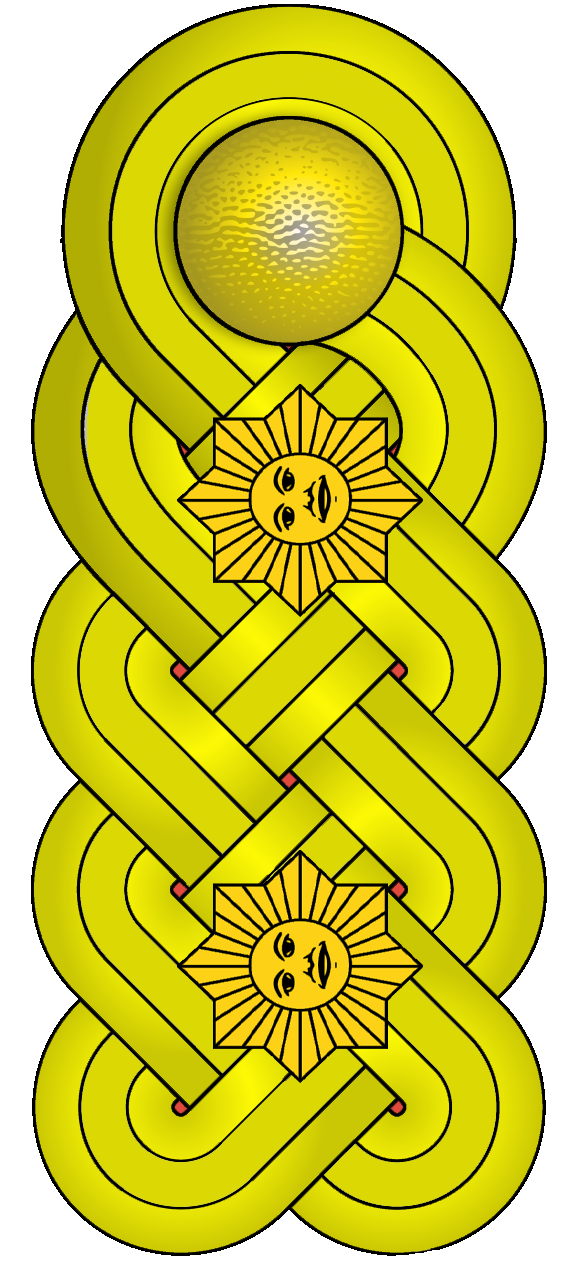
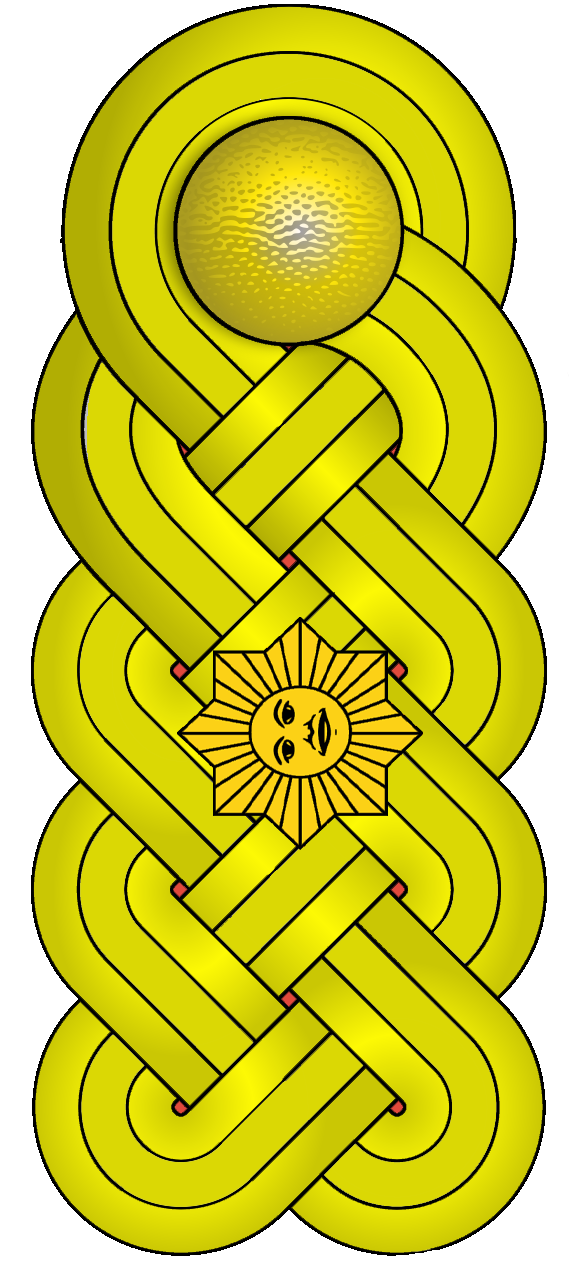
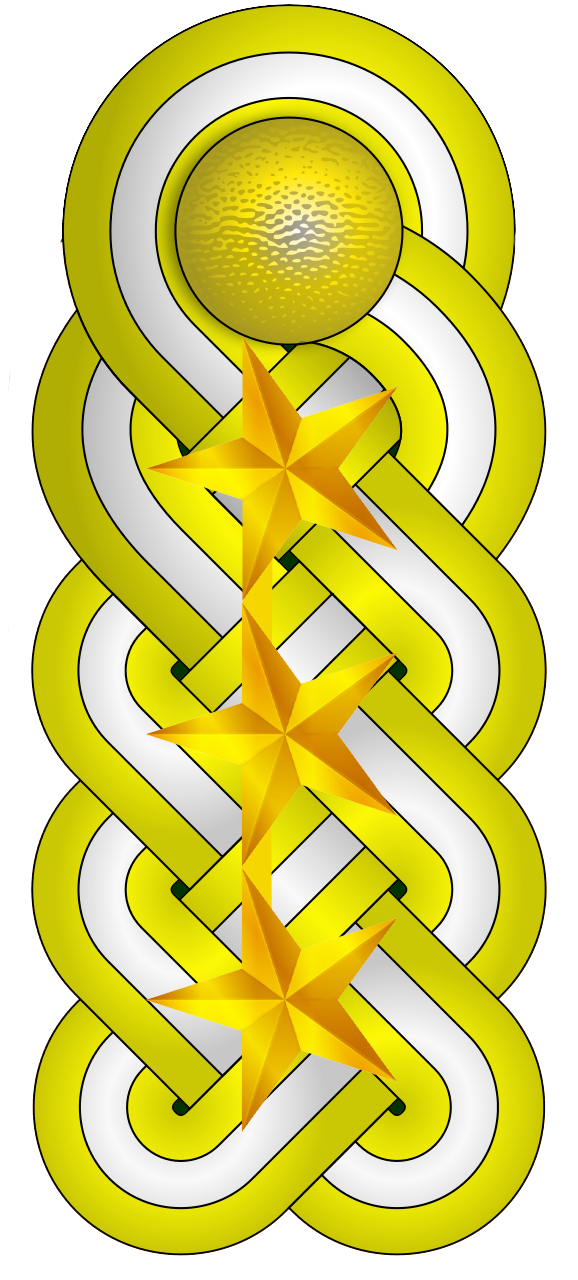
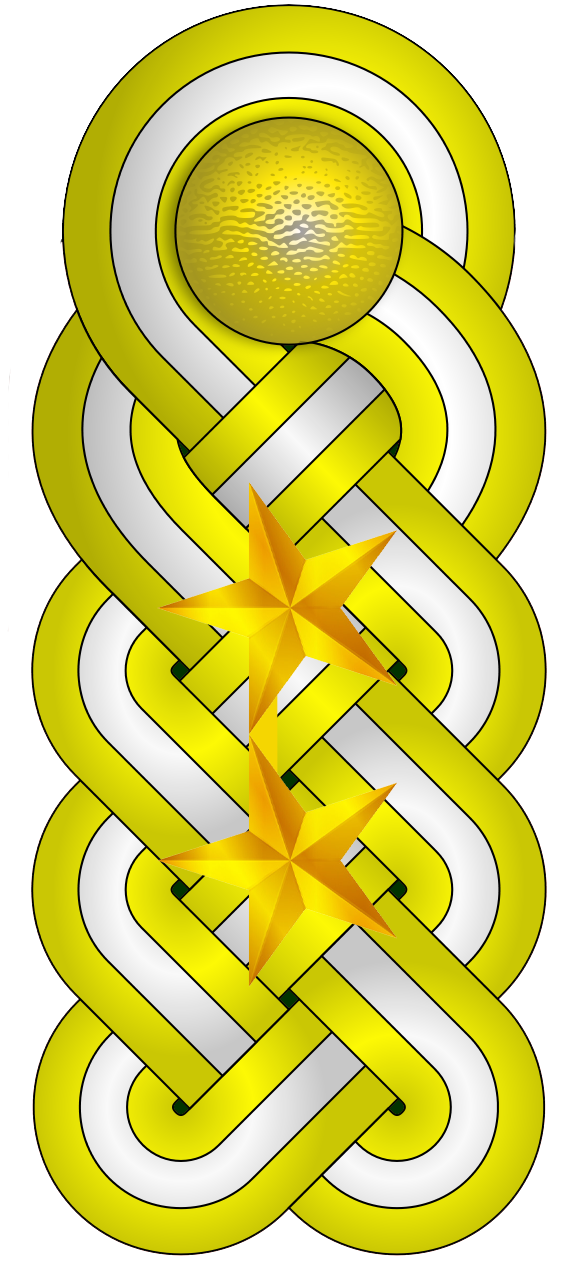
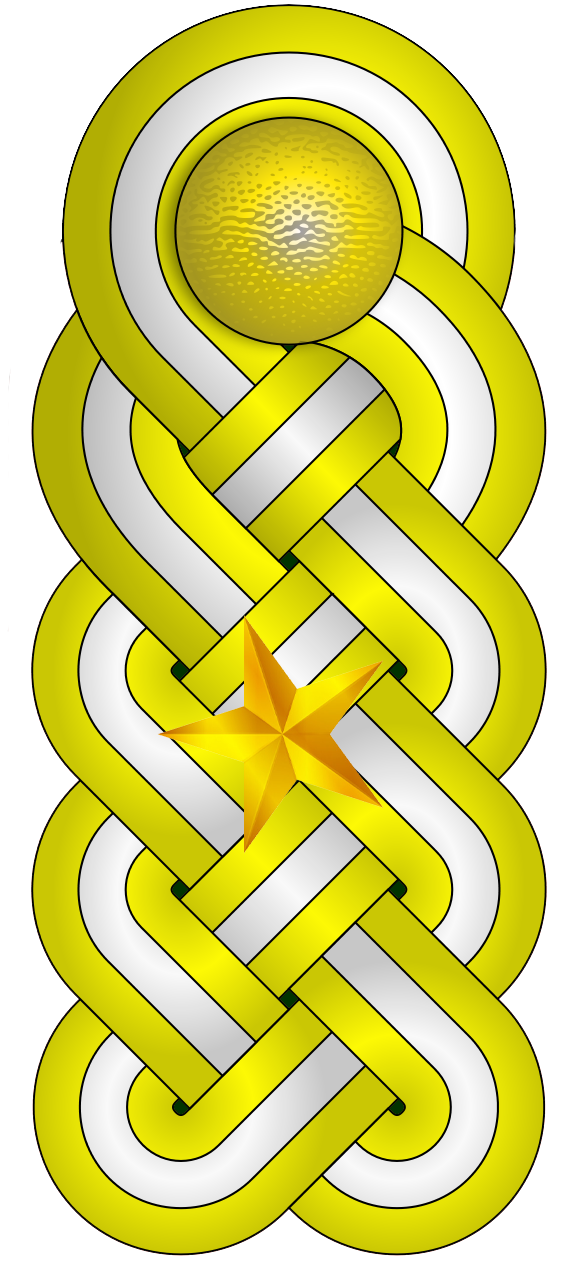
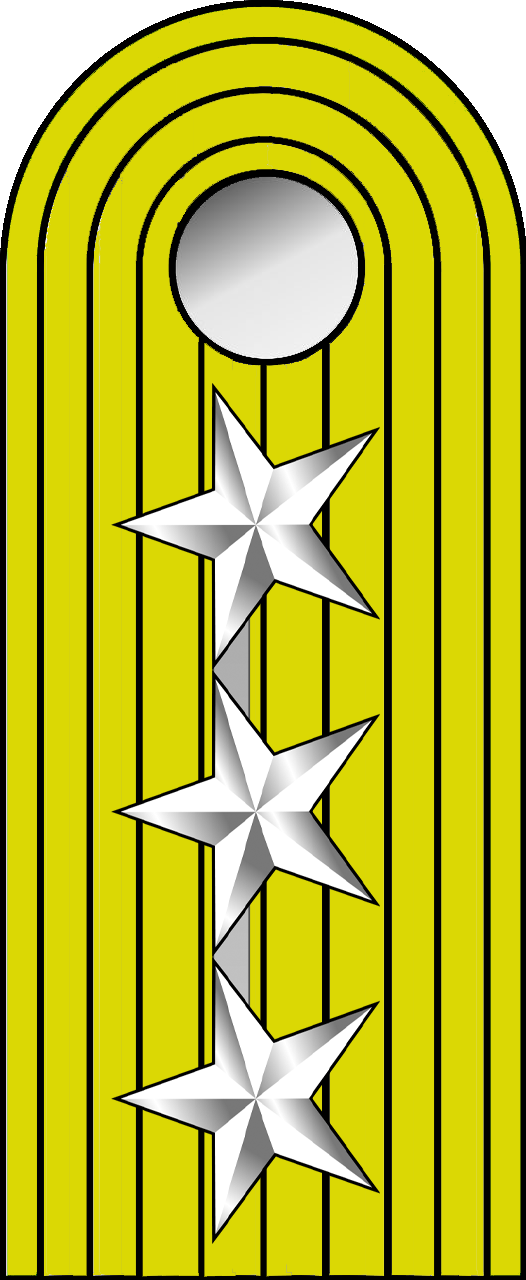
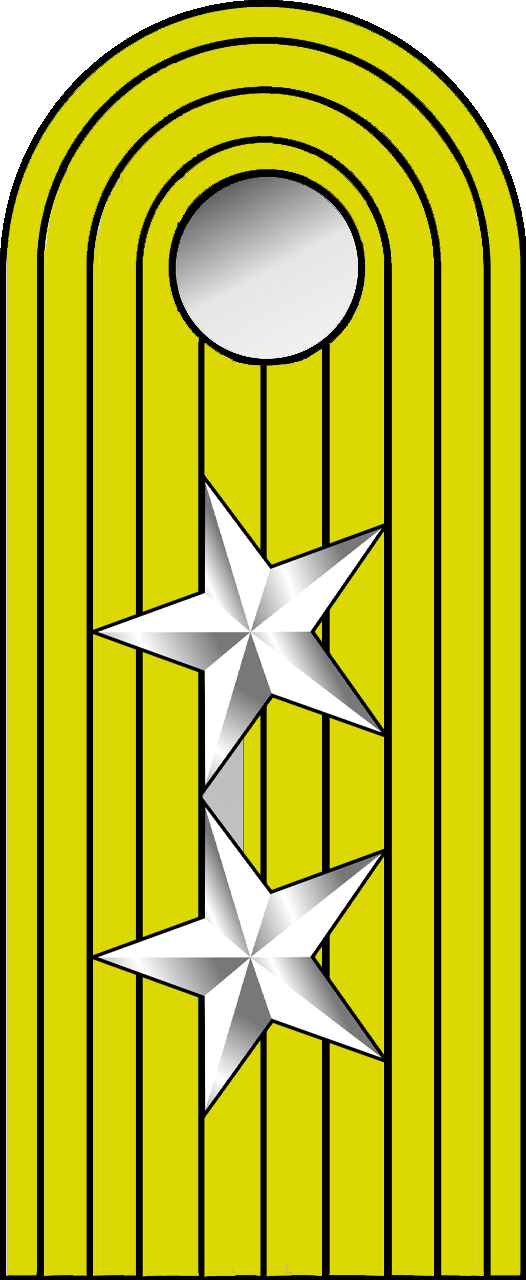
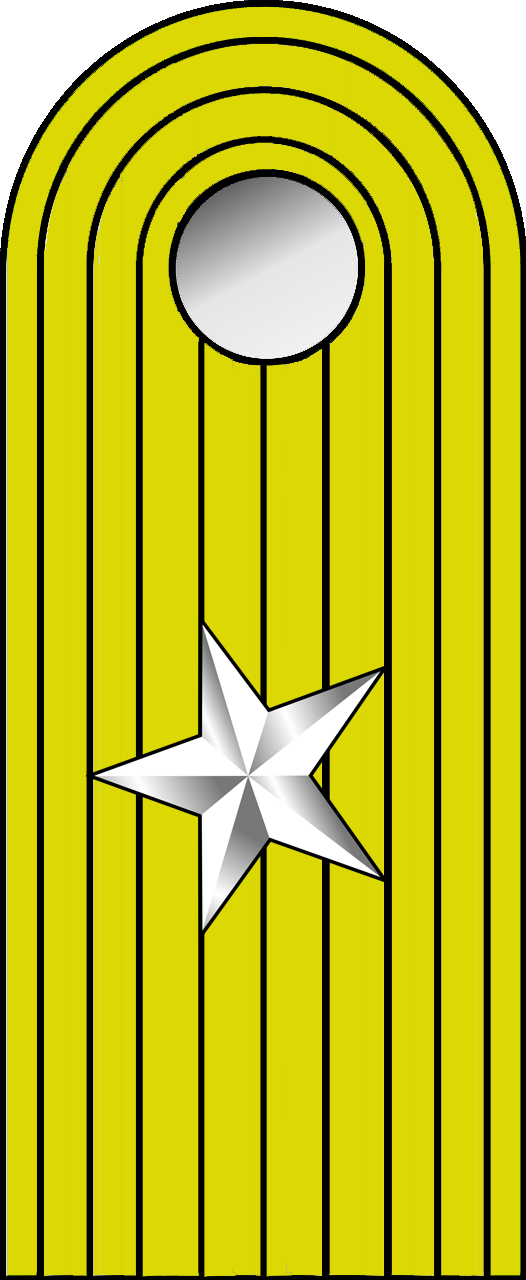
Rank group	General / flag officers				Senior officers			Junior officers
Venezuelan Army
Venezuelan Army	General en jefe	Mayor general	General de division	General de brigada	Coronel	Teniente coronel	Mayor	Capitán	Primer teniente	Teniente

Rank group	Senior NCOs							Junior NCOs		Enlisted
Venezuelan National Guard											No insignia
Venezuelan National Guard	Sargento supervisor	Sargento ayudante	Sargento mayor de primera	Sargento mayor de segunda	Sargento mayor de tercera	Sargento primero	Sargento segundo	Cabo primero	Cabo segundo	Distinguido	Guardia Nacional raso

== See also ==
- List of police ranks
- List of police ranks in Africa
- List of police ranks in Asia
- List of police ranks in Europe
- List of police ranks in Oceania
- Military rank
- United States law enforcement decorations
- Fire department ranks by country
- Ranks and insignia of gendarmeries
