= List of police ranks =

Element of hierarchy in law enforcement

Police ranks are a system of hierarchical relationships in police organizations. The rank system defines authority and responsibility in a police organization, and affects the culture within the police force. Police ranks, dependent on country, are similar to military ranks in function and design due to policing in many countries developing from military organizations and operations, such as in Western Europe, former Soviet countries, and English-speaking countries. Usually, uniforms denote the bearer's rank by particular insignia affixed to the uniforms.

Rank is not only used to designate leadership, but to establish pay-grade as well. As rank increases, pay-grade follows, but so does the amount of responsibility.

== Geographic lists ==
- List of police ranks in Africa
- List of police ranks in Asia
- List of police ranks in Europe
- List of police ranks in Oceania
- List of police ranks in the Americas

== See also ==
- Military rank
- Fire department ranks by country
- Ranks and insignia of gendarmeries
