= List of comparative firefighting ranks =

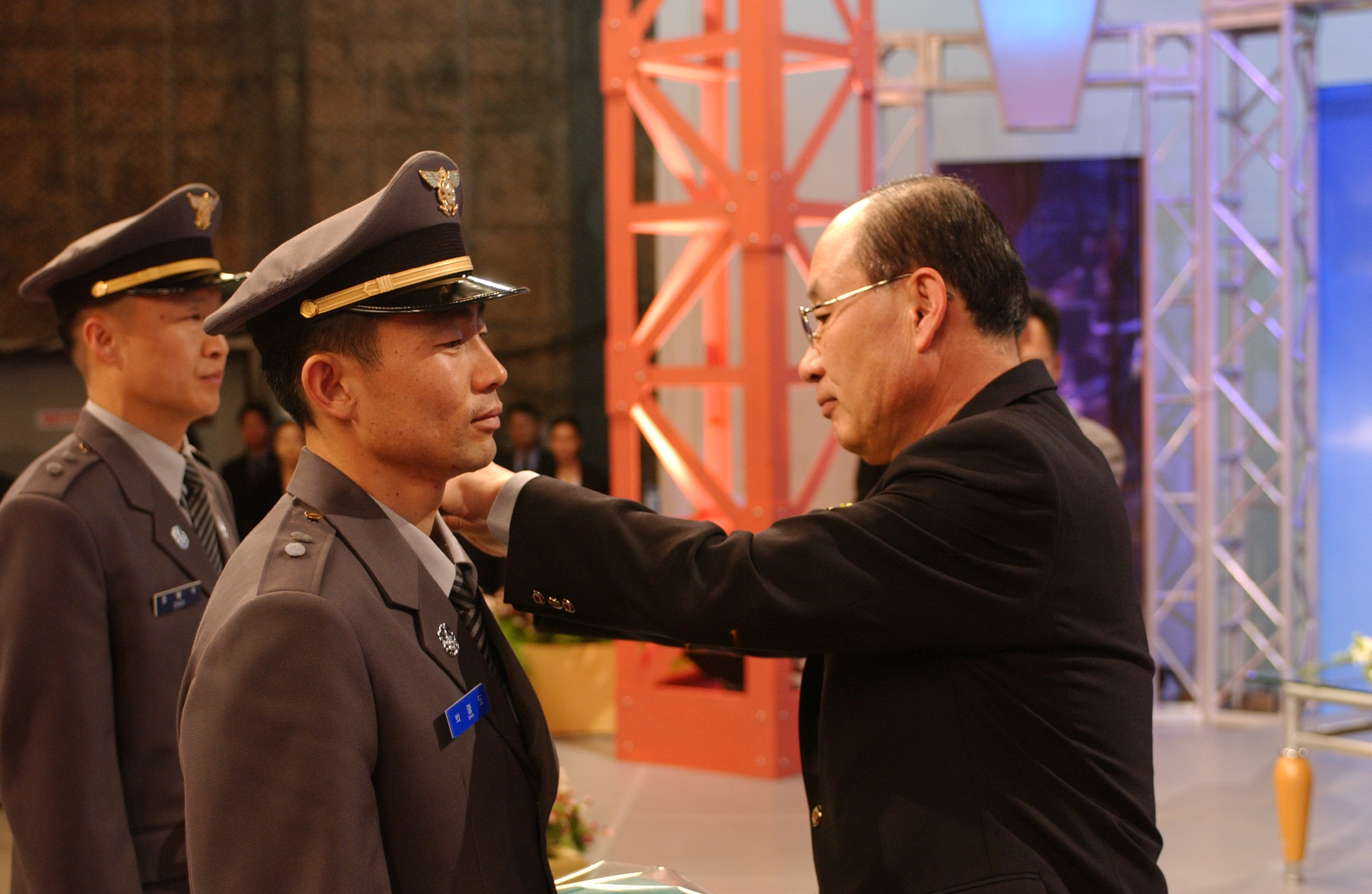
A firefighter from Seoul receives new rank insignia at an awards ceremony. Shoulder marks such as those seen here are a very common form of rank insignia in fire departments across the world.

Across the world, there is significant variation in the ranks used by fire departments, with this variance representing the diverse origins of firefighting in each country. Many nations use military-inspired ranks as firefighting in their nation originated with military units - for some countries, the military still performs civilian firefighting and so firefighting units will use the rank structures of said military. In other nations, firefighting may be a responsibility of the police, who also often use military-inspired rank structures. In other countries, rank structures were designed to be explicitly civilian, especially those which have been developed in more modern eras.

Rank insignia also varies heavily by country, often incorporating national symbols or rank devices which correlate with other public bodies. There is commonly a distinction made between rank insignia used on formal uniforms, which is designed to look smart and represent the values of the department and/or nation, and rank insignia used on personal protective equipment which must be resistant to contamination and highly visible to facilitate easy identification of commanders on the fireground.

== Australia ==
=== New South Wales ===
FRNSW Career Firefighters

Rank	Commissioner	Deputy Commissioner	Assistant Commissioner	Chief Superintendent	Superintendent	Inspector	Leading Station Officer	Station Officer	Leading Firefighter	Senior Firefighter; 15 years service	Senior Firefighter	Qualified Firefighter	Firefighter Level 2 (Probationary)	Firefighter Level 1 (Probationary)	Recruit
Insignia													No Epaulettes (Number 2 displayed on sides of helmet)	No Epaulettes (Number 1 displayed on sides of helmet)	

FRNSW Retained firefighters

Rank	Retained Captain	Retained Deputy Captain	Retained Firefighter; 15 years service	Retained Firefighter; 10 years service	Retained Firefighter; 5 years service	Retained Firefighter	Recruit
Insignia						No Insignia	Both Recruit and Student epaulettes used

NSW Rural Fire Service

Operational Rank	Membership Type	Insignia
Commissioner	NSW Government Senior Executive Service Officer	
Deputy Commissioner	NSW Government Senior Executive Service Officer	
Senior Assistant Commissioner		
Assistant Commissioner	NSW Government Senior Executive Service Officer	
Chief Superintendent	NSW Government Public Service Officer	
Superintendent	NSW Government Public Service Officer	
Inspector	NSW Government Public Service Officer	
Group Captain/Officer L3	Volunteer/NSW Government Public Service Officer	
Deputy Group Captain/Officer L2	Volunteer/NSW Government Public Service Officer	
Officer L1	NSW Government Public Service Officer	
Captain	Volunteer	
Senior Deputy Captain	Volunteer	
Deputy Captain	Volunteer	
Mitigation Crew Leader	NSW Government Public Service Officer	
Firefighter	Volunteer	
Member/Mitigation Crew Member	Volunteer/NSW Government Public Service Officer	

=== Victoria ===
Victoria Country Fire Authority

Administrative ranks for volunteer firefighters	Helmet insignia	Epaulette	Hardboard
Group officer			N/A
Deputy group officer			N/A
Operational ranks for volunteer firefighters	Helmet insignia	Epaulette	Hardboard
Captain			
1st lieutenant			
2nd to 5th lieutenant			N/A
Firefighter		N/A	N/A

=== Western Australia ===
Department of Fire and Emergency Services

	Executive and Managers								
Title	Commissioner	Deputy Commissioner	Assistant Commissioner	Chief Superintendent	Superintendent	District Officer; Urban & Rural Fire	District Officer; Natural Hazards	Area Officers	Community Emergency; Services Manager
Rank insignia									

	Professional Firefighters						
Title	Station Officer	Leading Firefighter	Senior Firefighter; Fifteen years service	Senior Firefighter	Firefighter; 1st & 2nd class	Firefighter; 3rd, 4th & 5th class	Firefighter Trainee
Rank insignia							

	Volunteer Firefighters							Volunteer Administrator
Title	Captain	Lieutenant	Apparatus Officer	Leading Firefighter	Senior Firefighter	Qualified Firefighter	Firefighter	Volunteer Secretary
Rank insignia								

== Austria ==
Salzburg Volunteer Fire Department

	Higher ranks				Administrative ranks		
Title	Landesbranddirektor (LBD)	Landesbranddirektor-Stv. (LBD-Stv.)	Oberbrandrat (OBR)	Brandrat (BR)	Hauptverwalter (HV)	Oberverwalter (OV)	Verwalter (V)
Rank insignia							

	Leading ranks						
Title	Abteilungsbrandinspektor (ABI)	Hauptbrandinspektor (HBI)	Oberbrandinspektor (OBI)	Brandinspektor (BI)	Hauptbrandmeister (HBM)	Oberbrandmeister (OBM)	Brandmeister (BM)
Rank insignia							

	Sub-officers/crew commanders			Firefighters and leading firefighters				
Title	Hauptlöschmeister (HLM)	Oberlöschmeister (OLM)	Löschmeister (LM)	Löschmeister (LM); 18 years as firefighter	Hauptfeuerwehrmann (HFM)	Oberfeuerwehrmann (OFM)	Feuerwehrmann (FM)	Probefeuerwehrmann (PFM)
Rank insignia								

== Belgium ==
Modern ranks Source:

	Officers (higher cadre)				NCOs (middle cadre)		Enlisted (basic cadre)	
Insignia								
French	Colonel	Major	Capitaine	Lieutenant	Adjudant	Sergent	Caporal	Sapeur-pompier
Dutch	Kolonel	Majoor	Kapitein	Luitenant	Adjudant	Sergeant	Korporaal	Brandweerman

Pre-2015 ranks

	Officers (higher cadre)			NCOs (middle cadre)		
Insignia						
French	Lieutenant-colonel	Capitaine-commandant	Sous-lieutenant	Adjudant-chef	Sergent-major	Premier Sergent
Dutch	Luitenant-Kolonel	Kapitein-Commandant	Onder-luitenant	Opperadjudant	Sergeant-majoor	Eerste sergeant

== Brazil ==
Officer grades

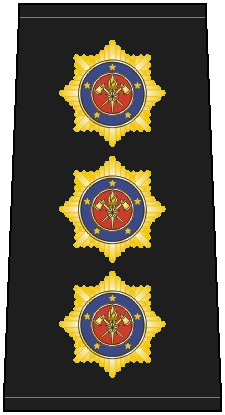
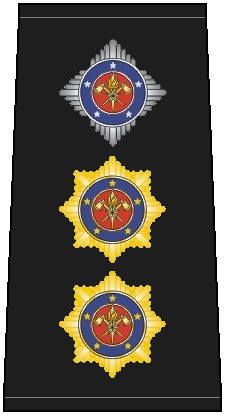
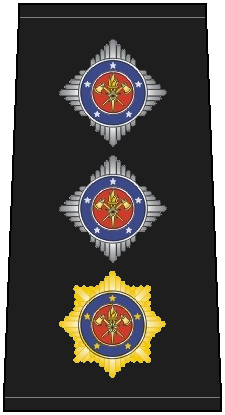
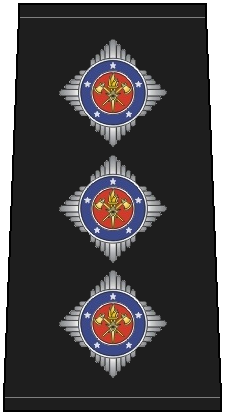
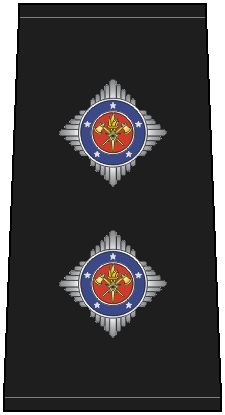
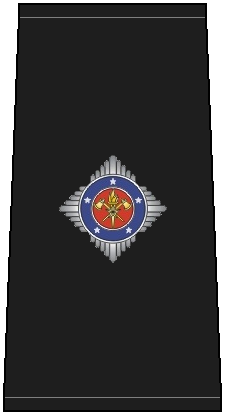
Rank group	General / flag officers	Senior officers			Junior officers
(Brazil) Military Firefighters Corps
(Brazil) Military Firefighters Corps		Coronel	Tenente-coronel	Major	Capitão	Primeiro tenente	Segundo tenente

NCO and enlisted grades

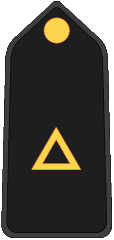
Rank group	Senior NCOs				Junior NCOs	Enlisted
(Brazil) Military Firefighters Corps
(Brazil) Military Firefighters Corps	Subtenente	Primeiro-sargento	Segundo-sargento	Terceiro-sargento	Cabo	Bombeiro primeira classe	Bombeiro segunda classe

== Canada ==
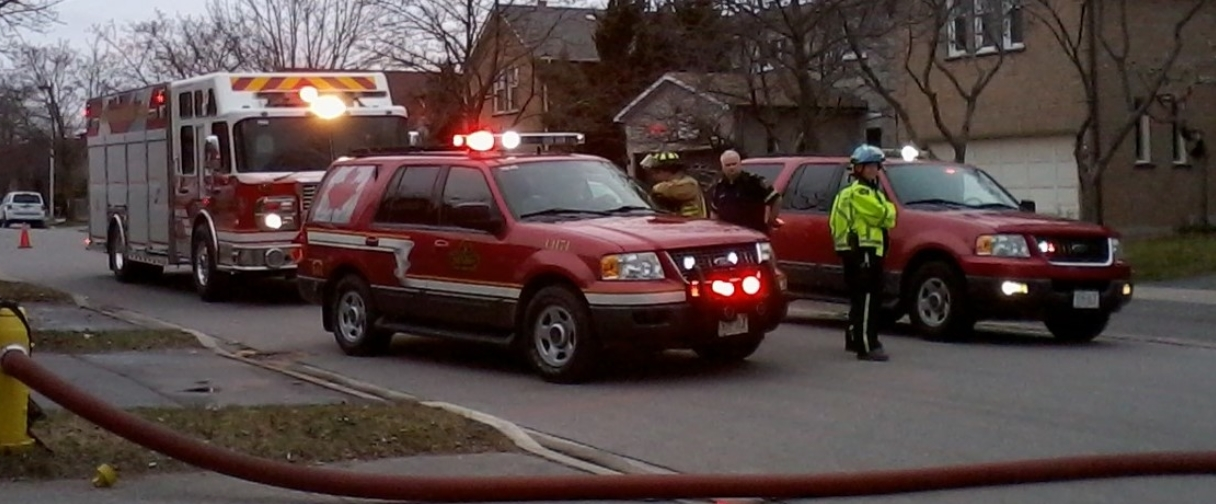
A chief and platoon chief coordinate activities on site of a house fire in Vaughan, Ontario

Ranking categories and insignia in the Canadian fire service is common across the country, with minor variations, often based on department size. Virtually every fire department in Canada has at least a fire chief, and usually captains.

Rank insignia is worn either on the collar, (colloquially called "collar dogs" or "collar brass"), or on epaulets, and in some cases, both. Also badges, which also denote rank, are worn in some regions.

Badge, stripe and trumpet colours are a further denotation, silver being non-Chief ranks, gold reserved for Chiefs.

Like the United States, Canada uses speaking trumpets for rank indication - a reference to a megaphone-like device used in the early days of the fire service, for officer ranks. Typically, silver trumpets indicate lieutenant (1 trumpet) or captain (2 trumpets), and gold indicates Chief officer ranks, ranging 2 trumpets (Battalion or District Chief) up to 5 trumpets (Fire Chief).

Due to close ties and histories with Britain, there are also considerable ranking similarities to the United Kingdom, including the use of rank insignia on uniform epaulettes.

=== Toronto ===
Rank	Fire chief	Deputy fire chief	Division commander	Platoon chief	District chief	Captain	First class firefighter	Second class firefighter	Probationary firefighter
Insignia							None	None	None

=== Montreal ===
Rank	Insignia
Firefighter/firefighter instructor	no insignia
Interim lieutenant	1 silver stripe
Lieutenant/lieutenant instructor	2 silver stripes
Captain	3 silver stripes
Operations chief	1 thick yellow stripe
Division chief	1 thick and 1 thin yellow stripe
Assistant chief	1 thick and 2 thin yellow stripes
Deputy chief	1 thick and 3 thin yellow stripes
Fire chief	1 thick and 4 thin yellow stripes plus star

=== Vancouver ===
	Fire chief	Deputy fire chief	Assistant chief	Battalion chief	Training officer	Captain	Lieutenant	Firefighter	Probationary firefighter
Rank epaulettes								No insignia	No insignia
Rank pins								No insignia	No insignia

== Colombia ==
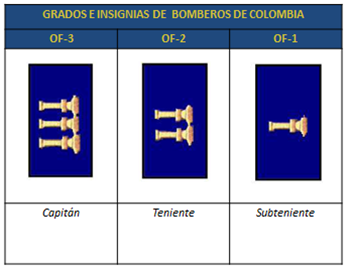
Fire Officers rank insignia of Colombia

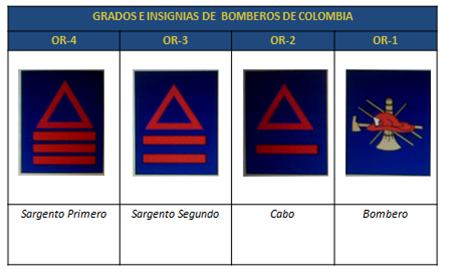
Fire Fighters rank insignia of Colombia

== Chile ==
Ranks are divided between company officers and fire department officers, which can be subdivided between active officers (field officers) and administrative officers. The active officers are the captain, and three or four lieutenants, these four active officers are distinguished by red lines on their helmets.

== China ==
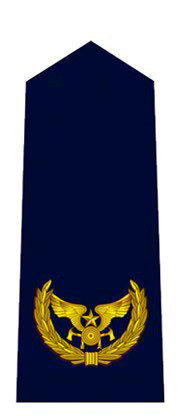
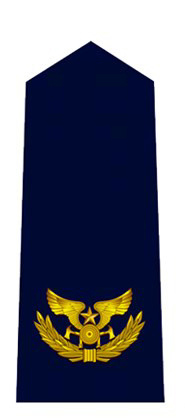
Commissioner	Deputy commissioner	Assistant commissioner	Commanders				Battalion chiefs
Director general	Deputy director general	Assistant director general	Senior commander	Commander I	Commander II	Commander III	Battalion chief I	Battalion chief II	Battalion chief III	Battalion chief IV

Senior firefighters			Intermediate firefighters		Junior firefighters
Captain I	Captain II	Captain III	Firefighter I	Firefighter II	Firefighter III	Firefighter IV	Probationary firefighter

== Czech Republic ==
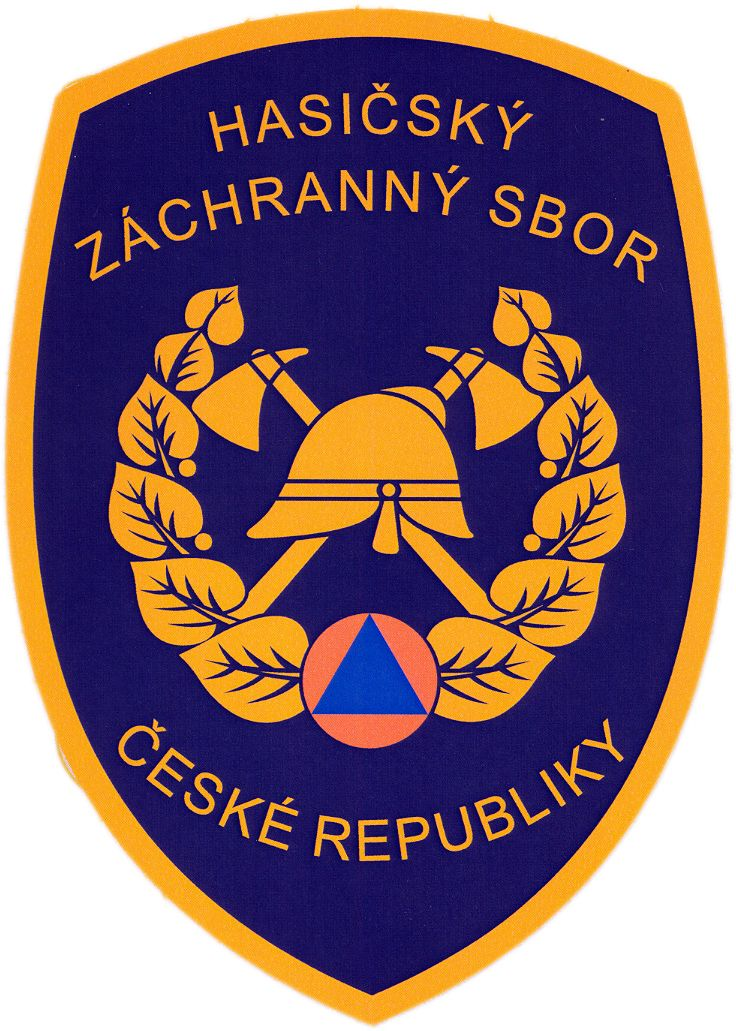
Insignia
Title	Generál- poručík	Generál- major	Brigádní generál	Plukovník	Podplukovník	Major	Kapitán	Nadporučík	Poručík	Podporučík	Nadpraporčík	Praporčík	Podpraporčík	Nadstrážmistr	Strážmistr	Rotný

== Cyprus ==
Rank
Chief Fire Officer
Deputy Chief
Fire Officer
Assistant Chief
Fire Officer
Station
Manager
Watch
Manager
Crew
Manager
Insignia

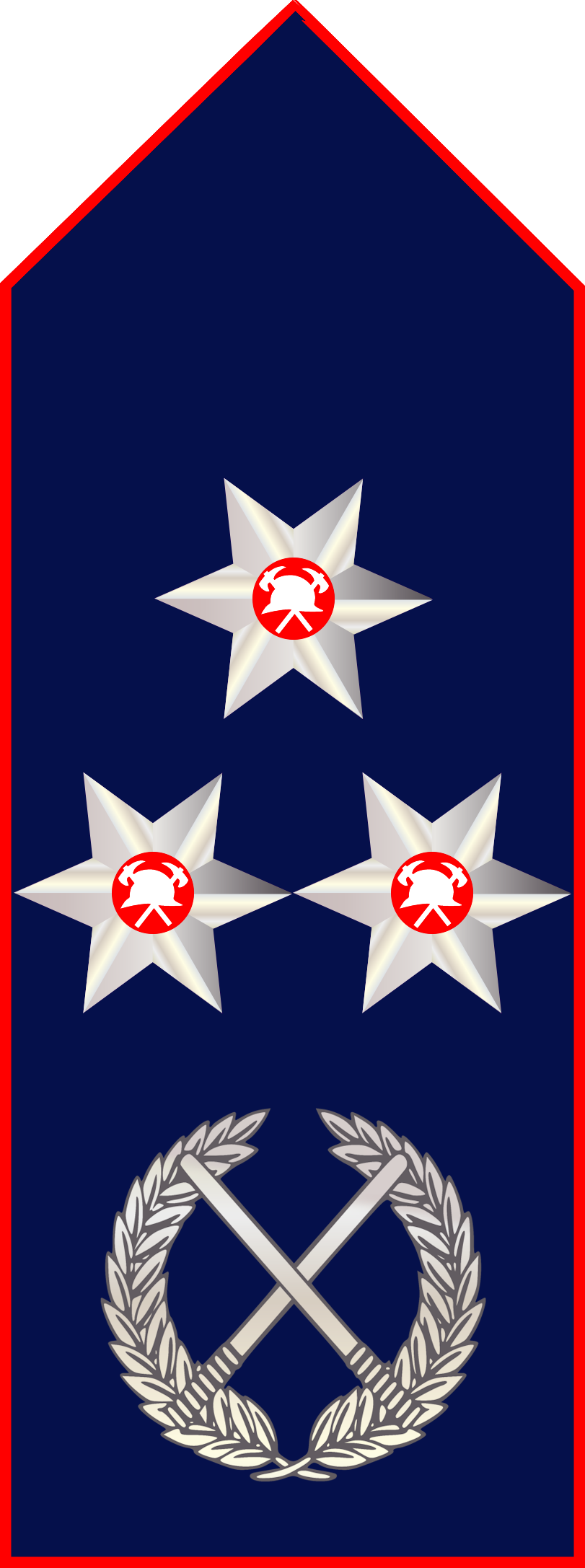

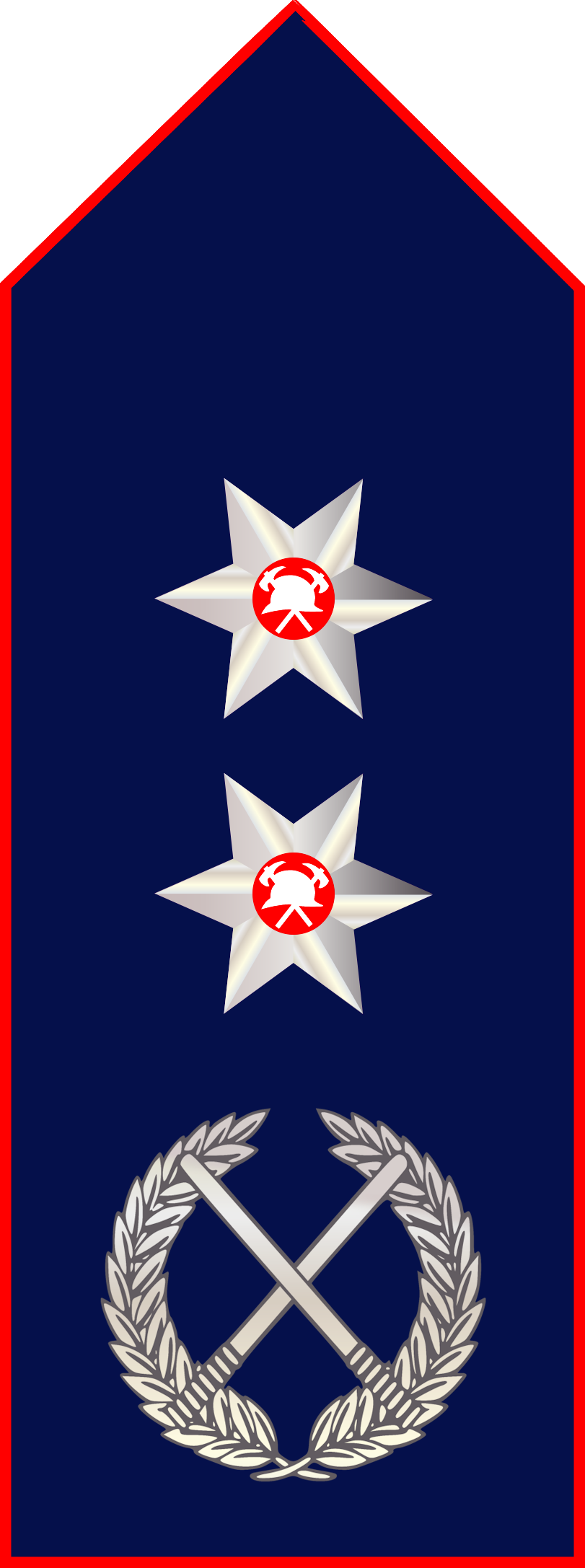

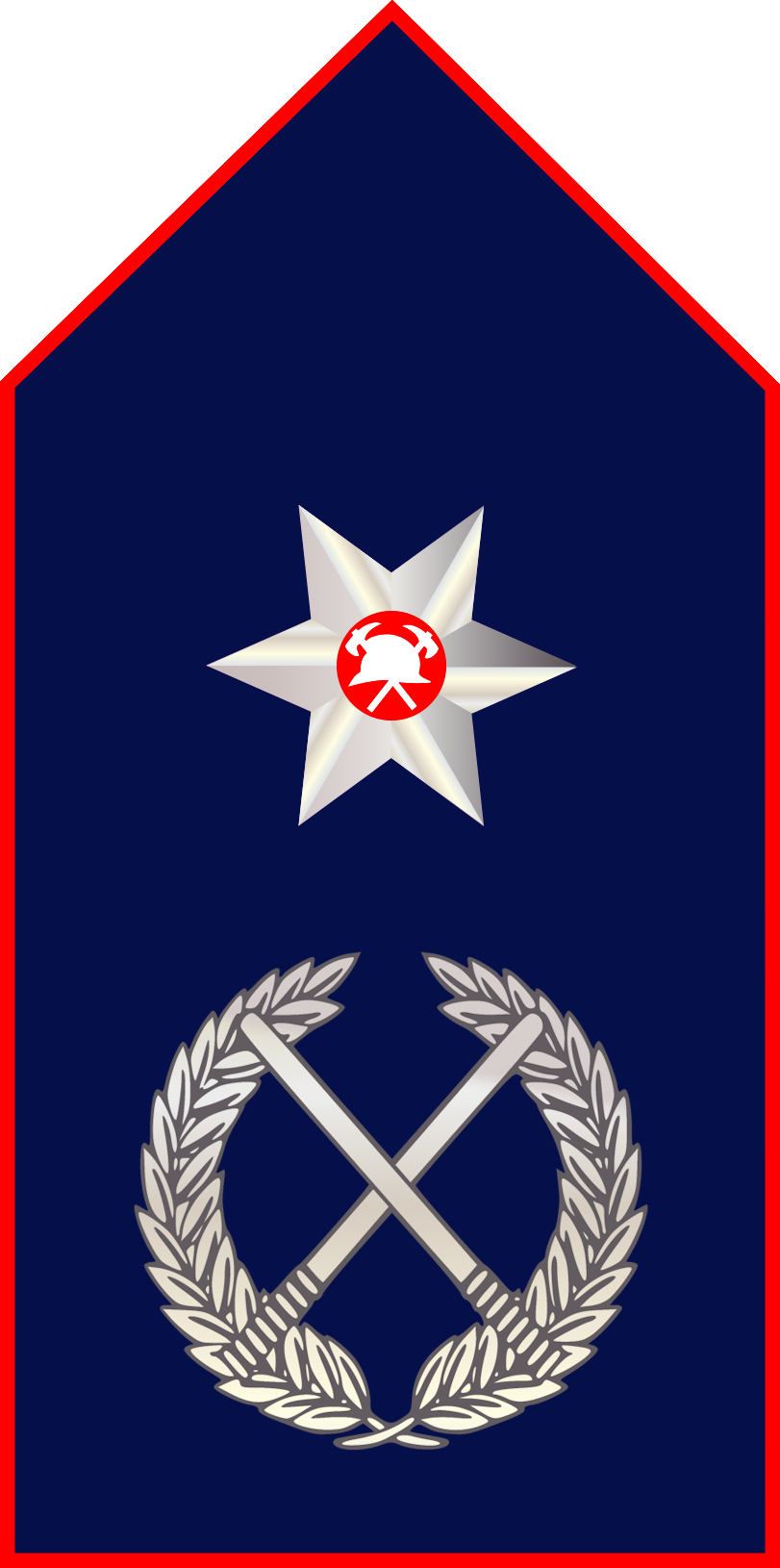

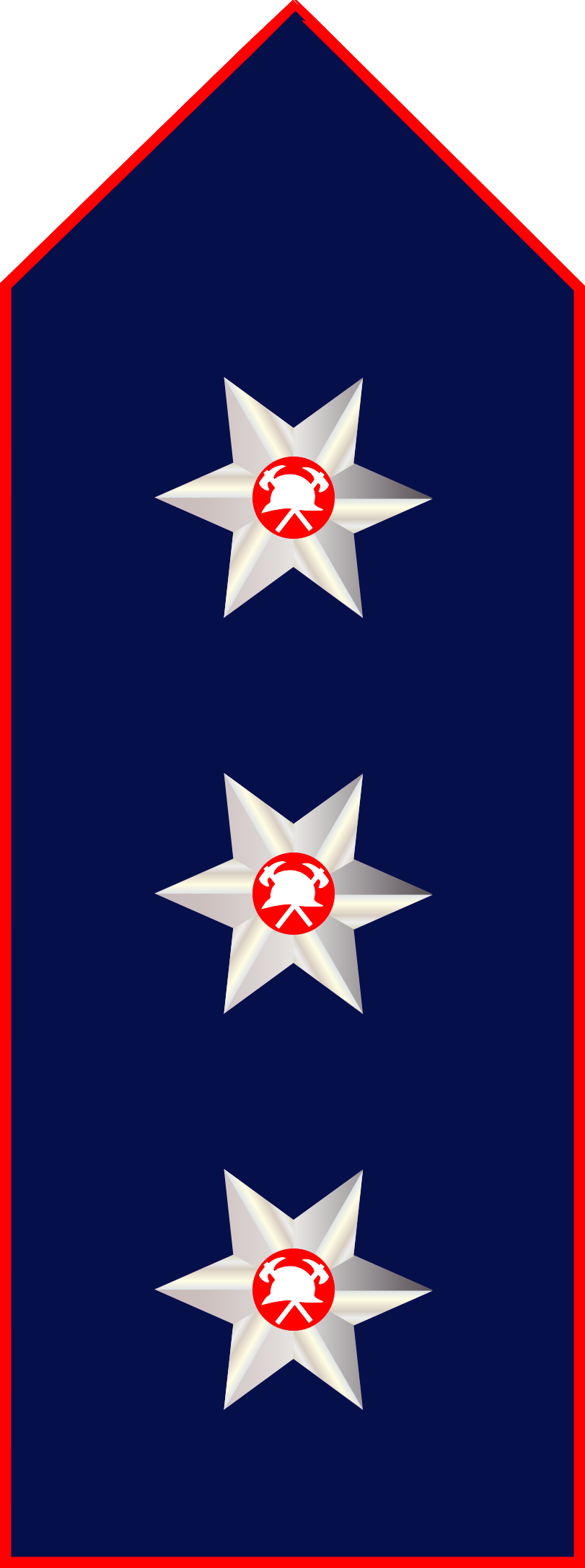

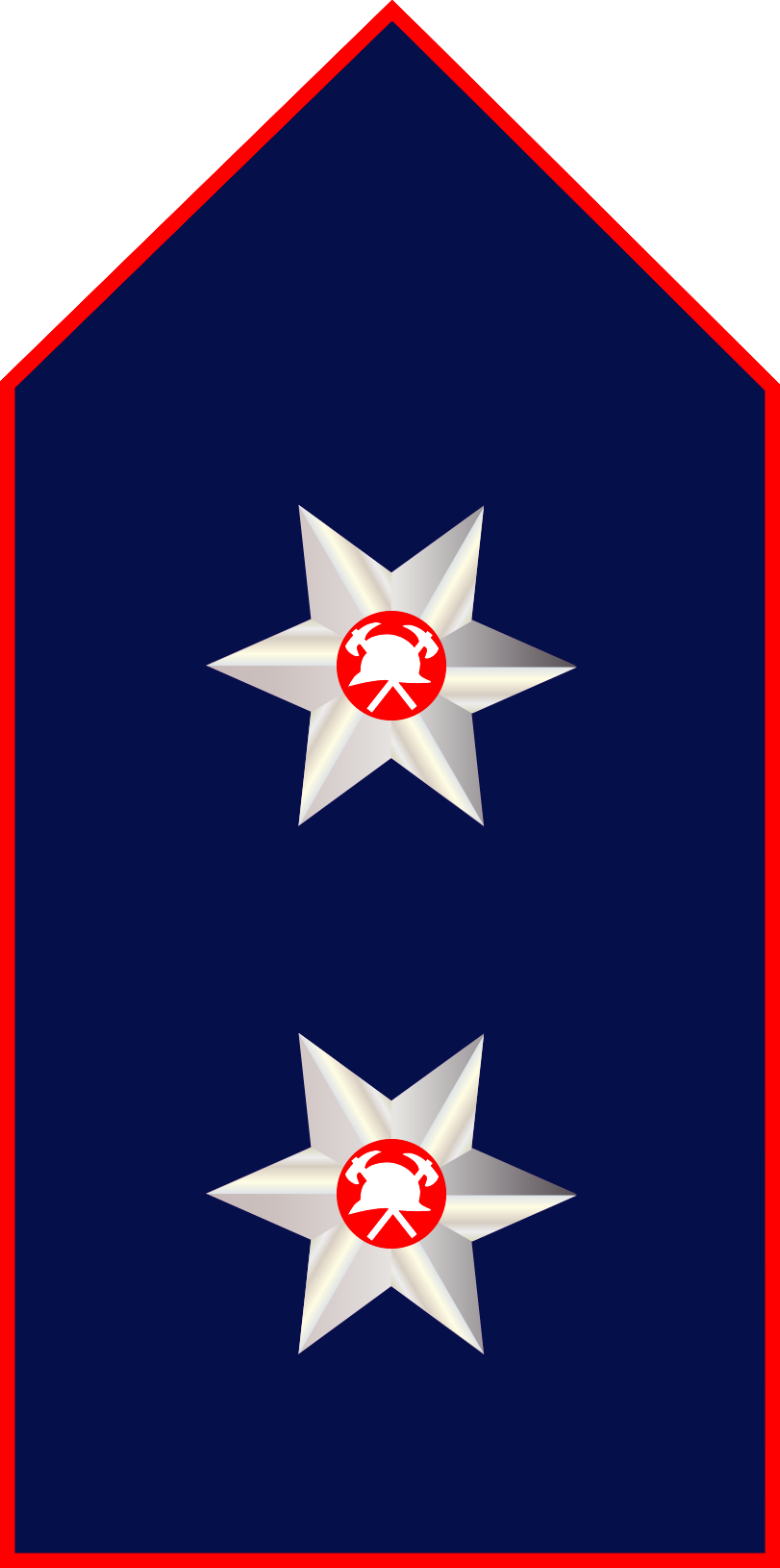

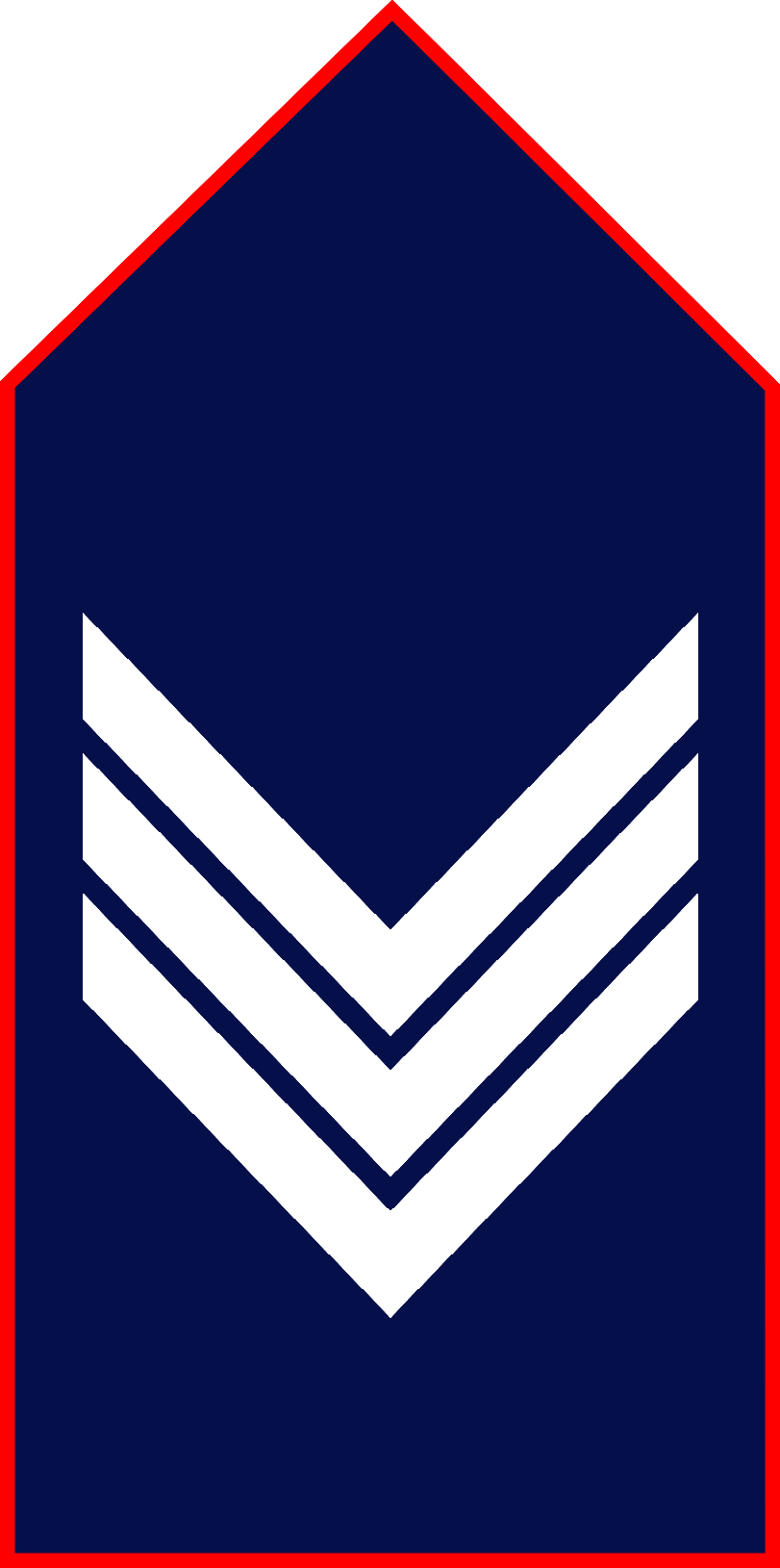

== Denmark ==
Rank epaulettes											
Title	Direktør	Vicedirektør	Afdelingschef	Områdeleder	Beredskabsinspektør	Viceberedskabsinspektør	Beredskabsmester	Viceberedskabsmester	Deltidsholdleder m. instruktør	Deltidsholdleder	Beredskabsassistent
Direct translation of Danish ranks	Emergency director/ Emergency chief	Deputy emergency director/ Deputy emergency chief	Department chief/ Area chief	Area manager	Fire inspector	Deputy fire inspector/ Station master	Emergency master/ Fire master	Deputy emergency master/ Deputy fire master	Part-time team leader with instructor skills	Part-time team leader	Fire assistant/ Emergency assistant
Equivalent in London Fire Brigade	Commissioner	Deputy commissioner	Assistant commissioner	Deputy assistant commissioner	Group manager	Station manager	Station officer	Sub-officer	No equivalent	No equivalent	Firefighter

== France ==
=== Civilian fire fighters ===
Civilian fire services uses the following ranks. The chief fire officer of a departemental fire brigade can be a comptroller general, a colonel senior class or a colonel, depending on the size of the brigade.

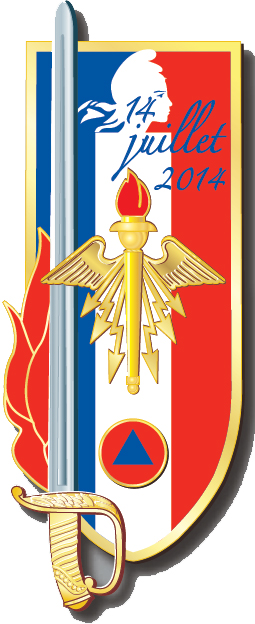
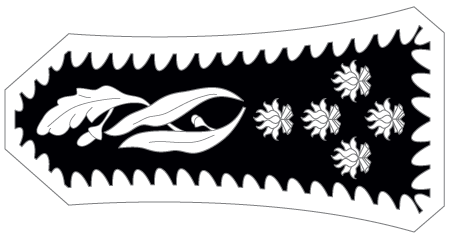
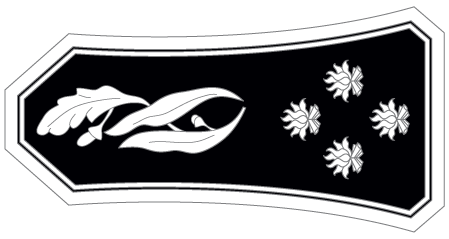
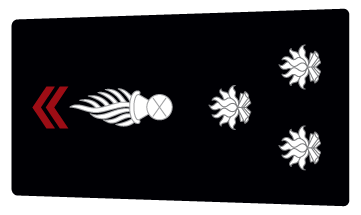
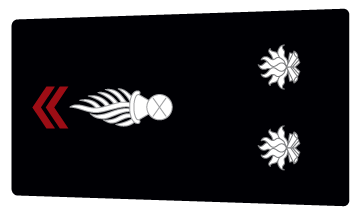
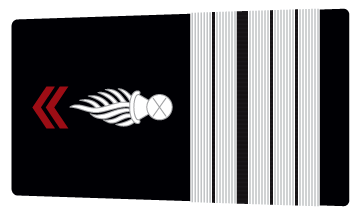
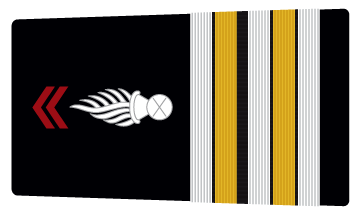
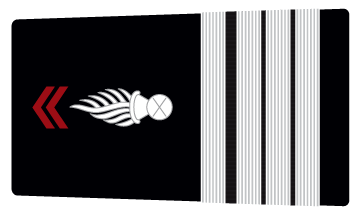
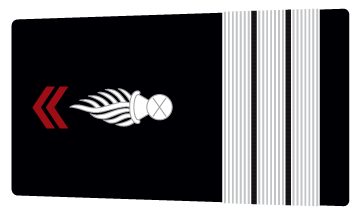
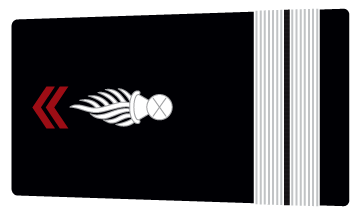
Ministry of Interior			Civilian professional firefighters class A+		Civilian professional firefighters class A			Civilian professional firefighters class B
Directeur Général de la sécurité civile et de la gestion des crises	Directeur des sapeurs-pompiers (directeur adjoint du DGSCGC)	Contrôleur général (officiers investis de responsabilités particulières envers l'État)	Contrôleur général	Colonel hors-classe Colonel	Lieutenant-Colonel	Commandant	Capitaine	Lieutenant hors classe Lieutenant de 1re classe Lieutenant de 2e classe

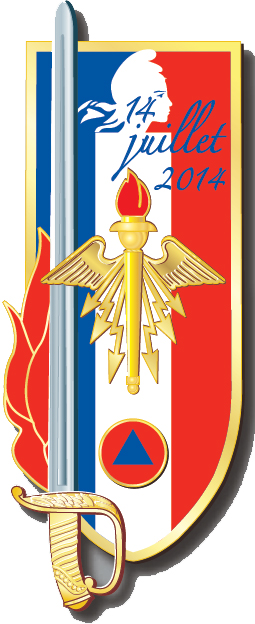
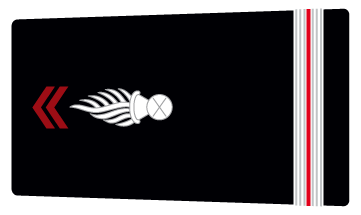
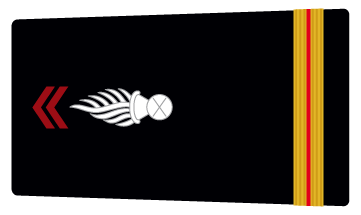
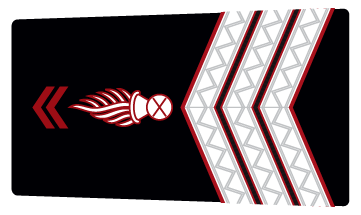
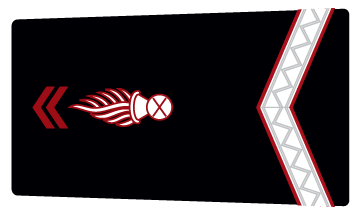
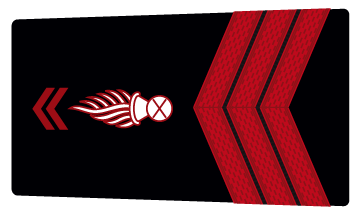
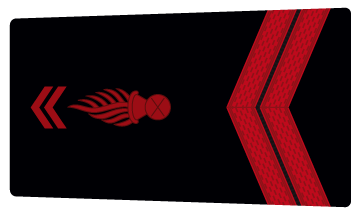
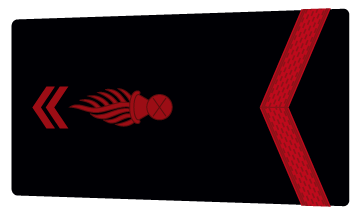
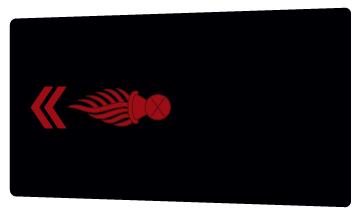
Civilian professional firefighters class C
Adjudant-Chef	Adjudant	Sergent-Chef	Sergent	Caporal-Chef	Caporal	Sapeur de 1re classe	Sapeur de 2e classe

=== Paris Fire Brigade ===
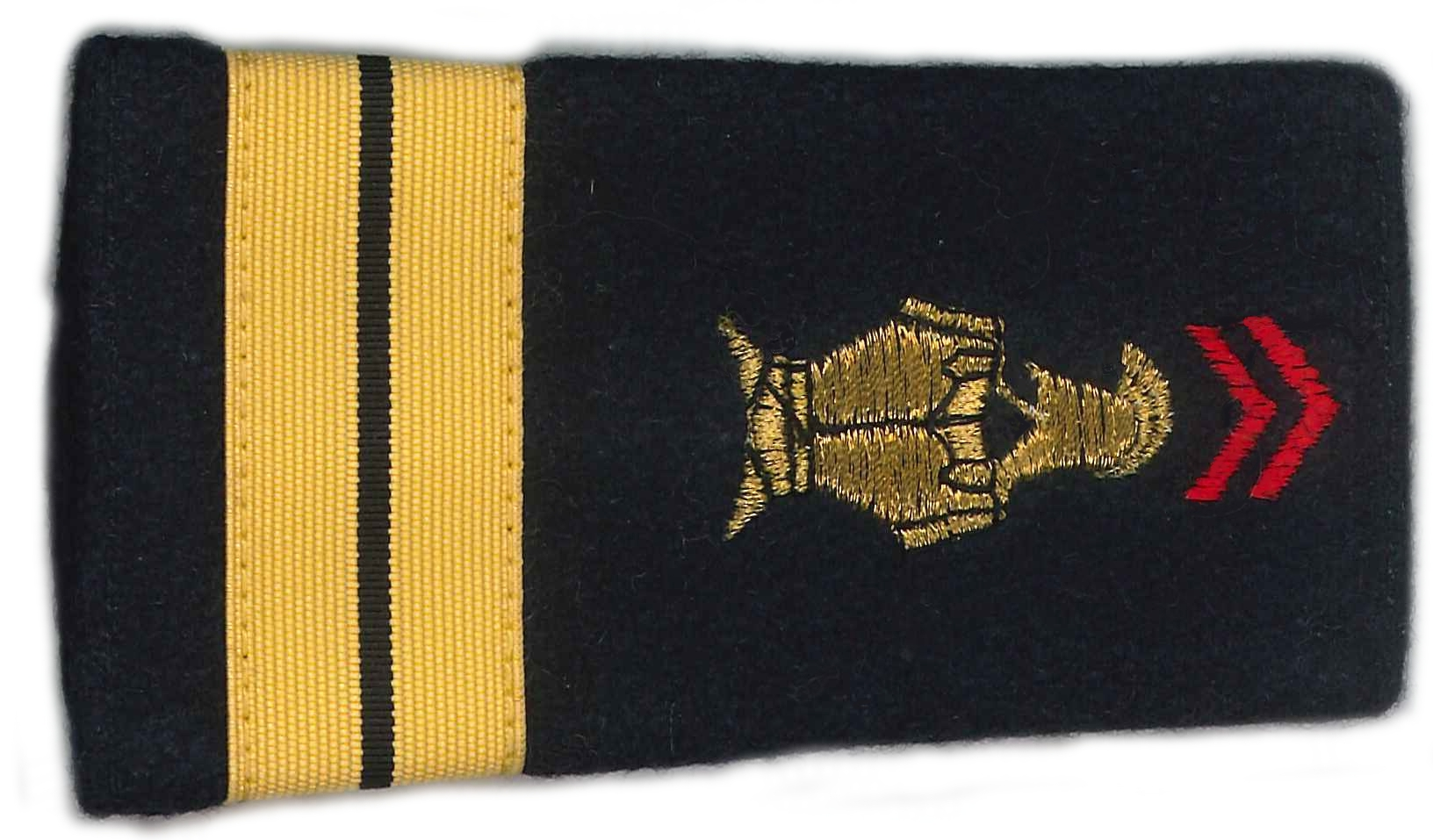
Rank insignia of a lieutenant of the Paris Fire Brigade

The Paris Fire Brigade belongs to the army and uses army ranks with the corps of engineers badge. The commanding officer has the rank of divisional general.

	Officers							
Rank	Général de division	Général de brigade	Colonel	Lieutenant-colonel	Commandant	Capitaine	Lieutenant	Sous-lieutenant
Rank insignia								

	Non-commissioned officers					
Rank	Major	Adjudant-chef	Adjudant	Sergent-Chef	Sergent with 2nd level specialty training	Sergent
Rank insignia						

	Firefighters							
Rank	Caporal-chef with a 1st grade technical certificate	Caporal-chef with 15 years service	Caporal-chef	Caporal with 15 years service	Caporal	Sapeur de 1re classe with 15 years service	Sapeur de 1re classe	Sapeur de 2nd classe
Rank insignia								

=== Marseille Naval Fire Battalion ===
The Marseille Naval Fire Battalion belongs to the navy and uses naval ranks. The commanding officer has the rank of rear admiral.

== Germany ==
In Germany every federal state has its own civil protection laws thus they have different rank systems. In the professional fire brigades, the intermediate technical fire service requires basic fire fighter training for employment, advanced fire technical service requires a bachelor's degree from a fire college or promotion from the intermediate service, while higher technical fire service requires a master's degree from a university. Additionally, in the volunteer fire departments, there is a difference between a rank and an official position. This is founded on the military traditions of the fire departments. Every firefighter can hold a high rank without having an official position. A firefighter can be promoted by years of service, training skills and qualifications. Official positions are partly elected or given by capabilities. These conditions allow that older ordinary firefighters have higher ranks than their leaders. But through this ranks are no authorities given (brevet rank).

=== Rheinland-Pfalz ===
Professional fire fighters (intermediate technical grades) Completed vocational training in a technical occupation suitable for the fire service. Basic firefighter training.

Hauptbrandmeister	Oberbrandmeister	Brandmeister	Brandmeister/-in während der Laufbahnausbildung

Professional fire fighters (advanced technical grades) Bachelor of engineering and two years departmental training

Brandoberamtsrat	Brandamtsrat	Brandamtmann	Brandoberinspektor	Brandinspektor	Brandinspektorenanwärter

Professional fire fighters (higher technical grades)

Master of engineering and two years of departmental training

Landesfeuerwehrinspekteur	Leitender Ministerialrat	Leitender Branddirektor; Ministerialrat	Branddirektor	Oberbrandrat	Brandrat	Brandreferendar

Helmet insignia

Higher technical grades, fire chiefs	Upper technical grades, battaΤΤΗΥΤΥlion chiefs	Company leaders

=== Saxony ===
Professional fire brigades

	(Higher technical fire service)					
Rank	Direktor in der Feuerwehr	Leitender Branddirektor	Branddirektor	Brandoberrat	Brandrat	Brandreferendar
Rank insignia						
Functions (Note: Which functions which ranks hold depends on the size of the fire brigade.)	Chief officer	Chief officer Deputy chief officer Assistant chief officer	Chief officer Deputy chief officer Assistant chief officer Deputy assistant chief officer	Chief officer Deputy chief officer Assistant chief officer Deputy assistant chief officer Area commander	Assistant chief officer Deputy assistant chief officer Group commander	Trainee

	(Advanced technical fire service)				
Rank	Brandamtsrat	Brandamtmann	Brandoberinspektor	Brandinspektor (Note: Promoted from intermediate service.)	Brandoberinspektor- Anwärter
Rank insignia					
Functions	Station Commander	Watch Commander	Watch Commander; Crew Commander	Watch Commander; Crew Commander	Trainee

	(Intermediate technical fire service)				
Ranks	Hauptbrandmeister higher pay	Hauptbrandmeister	Oberbrandmeister	Brandmeister	Brandmeister- Anwärter
Rank insignia					
Functions	Crew Commander	Leading firefighter	Firefighter	Firefighter	Trainee

Volunteer fire brigades

	Fire service technical staff			Management			
Rank	Brandamtsrat (Note: Full-time salaried employee.)	Hauptbrandinspektor	Oberbrandinspektor	Brandinspektor	Hauptbrandmeister	Oberbrandmeister	Brandmeister
Rank insignia							
Functions	Chief district fire officer	Chief district fire officer	Deputy chief district fire officer	Fire chief (Note: Chief of a fire brigade with more than three watches.)	Fire chief (Note: Chief of a fire brigade with three watches.)	Fire chief (Note: Chief of a fire brigade with one or two watches.)	Watch commander

	Sub-Officers		Crew Members			
Ranks	Hauptlöschmeister	Löschmeister	Hauptfeuerwehrmann	Obereuerwehrmann	Feuerwehrmann	Feuerwehrmann- Anwärter
Rank insignia						
Functions	Crew Commander	Leading firefighter (Specialist)	Leading firefighter	Leading firefighter	Firefighter	Trainee

=== Feuerschutzpolizei (1938–1945) ===
The Feuerschutzpolizei was formed in 1938 as a branch of the Ordnungspolizei, formed in 1938 when the German municipal professional fire brigades were transferred to the national police. The previously red fire vehicles, blue uniforms and fire service ranks were replaced by green fire vehicles, green uniforms and police ranks.

Professional fire departments in Prussia 1935–1938	Feuerschutzpolizei 1938–1941	Feuerschutzpolizei 1941–1945	Insignia
–	–	Generalleutnant	
Oberbranddirektor (Note: The fire chief of Berlin.)	Generalmajor	Generalmajor	
Oberbranddirektor; Branddirektor	Oberst	Oberst	
Oberbaurat	Oberstleutnant	Oberstleutnant	
Baurat	Major	Major	
Brandingenieur; Brandoberingenieur; Baurat (Note: With less than three years in the rank)	Hauptmann	Hauptmann	
–	–	Bezirkshauptmann	
–	Inspektor	Bezirksoberleutnant	
Oberbrandmeister	Obermeister	Leutnant	
–	–	Bezirksleutnant	
Brandmeister	Meister	Meister	
Löschmeister	Hauptwachtmeister	Hauptwachtmeister	
Oberfeuerwehrmann	Bezirksoberwachtmeister	Bezirksoberwachtmeister	
–	Oberwachtmeister	Oberwachtmeister	
Feuerwehrmann	Wachtmeister	Wachtmeister	
–	–	Rottwachtmeister	
–	–	Unterwachtmeister (Note: Only in the field units)	
–	–	Anwärter (Note: With more than six months in the rank.)	No insignia
–	–	Anwärter	No insignia

== Greece ==
Title	Lieutenant general	Major general	Brigadier	Colonel	Lieutenant colonel	Fire major	Fire captain	Fire lieutenant	Fire second lieutenant
Greek title	Αντιστράτηγος; Antistrátigos	Υποστράτηγος; Ypostrátigos	Αρχιπύραρχος; Archipýrarchos	Πύραρχος; Pýrarchos	Αντιπύραρχος; Antipýrarchos	Επιπυραγός; Epipyragós	Πυραγός; Pyragós	Υποπυραγός; Ypopyragós	Ανθυποπυραγός; Anthypopyragós
Insignia									

Title	Warrant officer (NCO)	Master sergeant	Sergeant	Senior firefighter	Firefighter
Greek title	Πυρονόμος; Pyronómos	Αρχιπυροσβέστης Παραγωγικής Σχολής; Archipyrosvéstis Paragogikís Scholís	Αρχιπυροσβέστης Μη Παραγωγικής Σχολής; Archipyrosvéstis Mi Paragogikís Scholís	Υπαρχιπυροσβέστης; Yparchipyrosvéstis	Πυροσβέστης; Pyrosvéstis
Insignia					

== Hungary ==
Officer grades

Rank group	General / flag officers	Senior officers			Junior officers
(Hungary) National Directorate General for Disaster Management
(Hungary) National Directorate General for Disaster Management		Tűzoltó ezredes	Tűzoltó alezredes	Tűzoltó őrnagy	Tűzoltó százados	Tűzoltó főhadnagy	Tűzoltó hadnagy

NCO and enlisted grades

Rank group	Senior NCOs						Junior NCOs	Enlisted
(Hungary) National Directorate General for Disaster Management
(Hungary) National Directorate General for Disaster Management	Tűzoltó főtörzszászlós	Tűzoltó törzszászlós	Tűzoltó zászlós	Tűzoltó főtörzsőrmester	Tűzoltó törzsőrmester	Tűzoltó őrmester

== India ==
In the Indian fire services, the ranks and hierarchy may vary slightly across different states and organizations. The specific rank names and their corresponding responsibilities may vary across different states and organizations in India. The following ranks are commonly found in indian fire departments.

- Director general, fire and rescue services (head of the department) (IPS cadre officer in the rank of DGP)
- Director/additional director
- Regional fire officer/ divisional officer/joint director
- District fire officer
- Station officer, (in-charge of fire stations)
- Assistant station officer
- Senior fire and rescue officer/senior fireman/leading fireman
- Fire and rescue officer/fireman/ fireman (driver), (this is the entry-level position in the fire service.)

=== Kerala Fire and Rescue Services ===
Kerala Fire and Rescue Services – Rank Structure
Title / Designation	Insignia	Explanation
Director General, Fire and Rescue Services, Civil Defence and Homeguards		An IPS officer of the rank DGP; Head of the department, overall command and policy decisions
Director (Technical) / Director (Administration)		Highest ranking uniformed officers assisting the DG in technical and administrative matters
Regional Fire Officer (RFO)		Supervises fire services across multiple districts; reports to headquarters. Heads fire and rescue services academy.
District Fire Officer (DFO)		In charge of fire and rescue operations in a district; manages fire stations within the district
Station Officer (STO)		Officer-in-charge of a fire station; leads fire and rescue operations locally. Also heads .
Assistant Station Officer (ASTO)		Assists the Station Officer in day-to-day operations and leadership
Senior Fire and Rescue Officer (SFRO)	(Sleeve insignia)	Experienced firefighter; may act as team leader in operations
Senior Fire and Rescue Officer (Mechanic)	(Sleeve insignia)	Specialised role for maintenance of fire vehicles and mechanical equipment
Fire and Rescue Officer (Driver)	No insignia	Drives and operates fire engines and emergency vehicles
Fire and Rescue Officer (FRO)	No Insignia	Entry-level personnel; frontline responder in fire and rescue missions

== Indonesia ==
Firefighters in Indonesia form part of the civil service of local governments and wear variant forms of uniforms worn by civil servants and employees.

Rank category	Rank category number	Rank in Indonesian	Equivalent rank (with US general schedule and UK civil service paygrade)	Rank in English (Provincial/city/municipal/regency/district fire service personnel only)
Directors and commissioners	IV/e	Pembina Utama	Director general senior executive service level V, pay band 3 A7	Director
Directors and commissioners	IV/d	Pembina Utama Madya	Director senior executive service level V pay band 2 A7	Chief commissioner
Directors and commissioners	IV/c	Pembina Utama Muda	Deputy director GS-15, pay band 2 A6	Commander
Subaltern and field ranked officers	IV/b	Pembina Tingkat I	Assistant director GS-14, grade 6 A5	Senior commissioner
Subaltern and field ranked officers	IV/a	Pembina	Senior executive officer 1st class GS-14, grade 7 A4	Commissioner
Subaltern and field ranked officers	III/d	Penata Tingkat I	Senior executive officer 2nd class GS-13, grade 7 A3	Battalion chief
Subaltern and field ranked officers	III/c	Penata	Higher executive officer 1st class GS-12, grade 7 A2	Captain
Lieutenants	III/b	Penata Muda Tingkat I	Higher executive officer GS-11, A2	First lieutenant
Lieutenants	III/a	Penata Muda	Executive officer 1st class GS-10, A2/B6	Second lieutenant
Senior NCOs	II/d	Pengatur Tingkat I	Executive officer 2nd class GS-9, A1/B6	Station sub-officer
Senior NCOs	II/c	Pengatur	Executive officer GS-8, A1/B5	Brigadier major
Junior NCOs	II/b	Pengatur Muda Tingkat I	Administrative officer class 1 GS-7, B4	Brigadier 1st class
Junior NCOs	II/a	Pengatur Muda	Administrative officer class 2 GS-6, B4	Senior brigader
Basic level	I/d	Juru Tingkat I	Higher clerical officer 1st class GS-5, B3	Brigadier
Basic level	I/c	Juru	Higher clerical officer GS-4/GS-3, B3	Junior brigadier
Basic level	I/b	Juru Muda Tingkat I	Clerical officer GS-2, B2	Senior firefighter
Basic level	I/a	Juru Muda	Administrative assistant GS-1, B1	Firefighter

== Iran ==
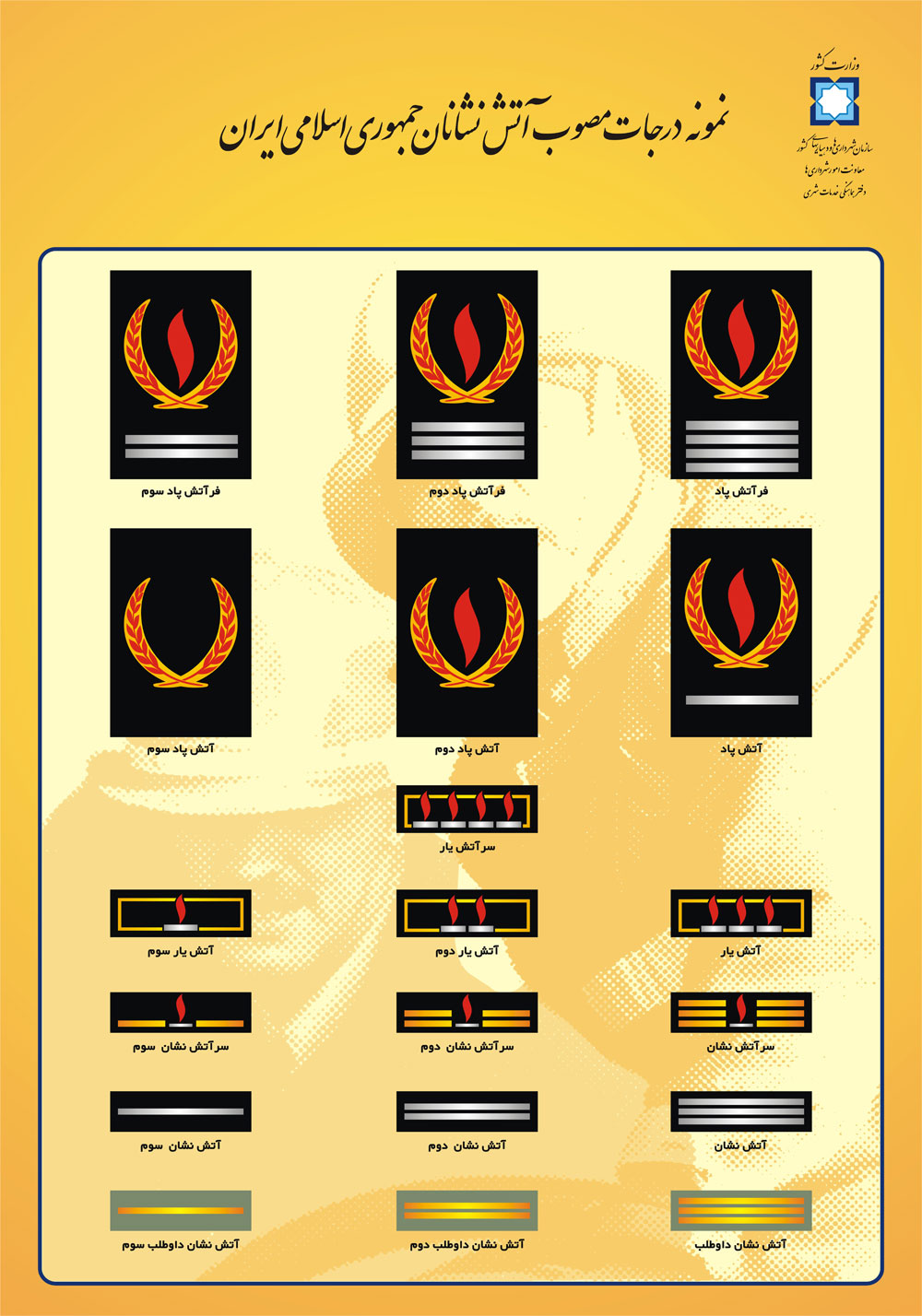
Iranian insignia

In Iran, every city has its own fire department, but ranks are the same in the whole country, and are as follows:

Rank	Persian	Collar/epaulette markings	Collar/epaulette markings (in Persian)
Volunteer firefighter III	آتش نشان داوطلب سوم	One golden bar	یک خط طلایی
Volunteer firefighter II	آتش نشان داوطلب دوم	Two golden bars	دو خط طلایی
Volunteer firefighter	آتش نشان داوطلب	Three golden bars	سه خط طلایی
Firefighter III	آتش نشان سوم	One silver bar	یک خط نقره ای
Firefighter II	آتش نشان دوم	Two silver bars	دو خط نقره ای
Firefighter	آتش نشان	Three silver bars	سه خط نقره ای
Head firefighter III	سرآتش نشان سوم	One flame with a thin silver bar below it and one golden bar	یک شعله با زیر پایه ی نقره ای نازک و یک خط طلایی
Head firefighter II	سرآتش نشان دوم	One flame with a thin silver bar below it and two golden bars	یک شعله با زیر پایه ی نقره ای نازک و دو خط طلایی
Head firefighter	سرآتش نشان	One flame with a thin silver bar below it and three golden bars	یک شعله با زیر پایه ی نقره ای نازک و سه خط طلایی
Master firefighter III	آتش یار سوم	One flame with golden border and silver bar below flame	یک شعله با حاشیه ی طلایی و زیر پایه ی نقره ای حجیم زیر شعله
Master firefighter II	آتش یار دوم	Two flames with golden border and silver bar below each flame	دو شعله با حاشیه ی طلایی و زیر پایه ی نقره ای حجیم زیر هر شعله
Master firefighter	آتش یار	Three flames with golden border and silver bar below each flame	سه شعله با حاشیه ی طلایی و زیر پایه ی نقره ای حجیم زیر هر شعله
Head master firefighter	سر آتش یار	Four flames with golden border and silver bar below each flame	چهار شعله با حاشیه ی طلایی و زیر پایه ی نقره ای حجیم زیر هر شعله
Chief firefighter III	آتش پاد سوم	One empty golden wreath	یک حلقه گل طلایی خالی
Chief firefighter II	آتش پاد دوم	One golden wreath with a flame inside it	یک حلقه گل طلایی با یک شعله درونش
Chief firefighter	آتش پاد	One golden wreath with a flame inside it and a silver bar below them	یک حلقه گل طلایی با یک شعله درونش و یک خط نقره ای زیر آنها
Chief master firefighter III	فرآتش پاد سوم	One golden wreath with a flame inside it and two silver bars below them	یک حلقه گل طلایی با یک شعله درونش و دو خط نقره ای زیر آنها
Chief master firefighter II	فرآتش پاد دوم	One golden wreath with a flame inside it and three silver bars below them	یک حلقه گل طلایی با یک شعله درونش و سه خط نقره ای زیر آنها
Chief master firefighter	فرآتش پاد	One golden wreath with a flame inside it and four silver bars below them	یک حلقه گل طلایی با یک شعله درونش و چهار خط نقره ای زیر آنها

== Ireland ==
Ireland's fire service is provided by its 31 local authorities. The four Dublin local authorities provide an unified fire service for County Dublin. Dublin Fire Brigade also provides an emergency ambulance service. Galway City Council and Galway County Council also provide a unified fire service. Whereas Cork City Council and Cork County Council provide separate fire services. The remaining local authorities provide a fire service for their respective county. Ireland's ranks and insignia are similar across the country, with some differences in Dublin Fire Brigade.

Structure	County brigades		Dublin Fire Brigade	
Rank	Insignia	Helmet	Insignia	Helmet
Firefighter		Yellow		Yellow
Leading firefighter or driver mechanic		Yellow, one 12 mm horizontal black stripe	This rank is not used in Dublin	
Sub officer		Yellow, two 12 mm horizontal black stripes		Yellow, two 12 mm horizontal black stripes
Station officer		White, one 19 mm horizontal black stripe		White, one 12 mm horizontal black stripe
District officer (operations) or district FPO	DO Dublin only, Third Fire Officer Dublin and Cork City only			White, one 19 mm horizontal black stripe
Third officer (operations) or executive FPO	DO Dublin only, Third Fire Officer Dublin and Cork City only			White, two horizontal black stripes (one 19 mm, one 12 mm)
Senior assistant chief fire officer		White, one 38 mm horizontal broad black stripe	This rank is not used in Dublin	
Chief fire officer		White, two 38 mm horizontal broad black stripes		White, one 38 mm horizontal broad black stripe
Key: FPO = fire prevention officer

== Israel ==
Officers

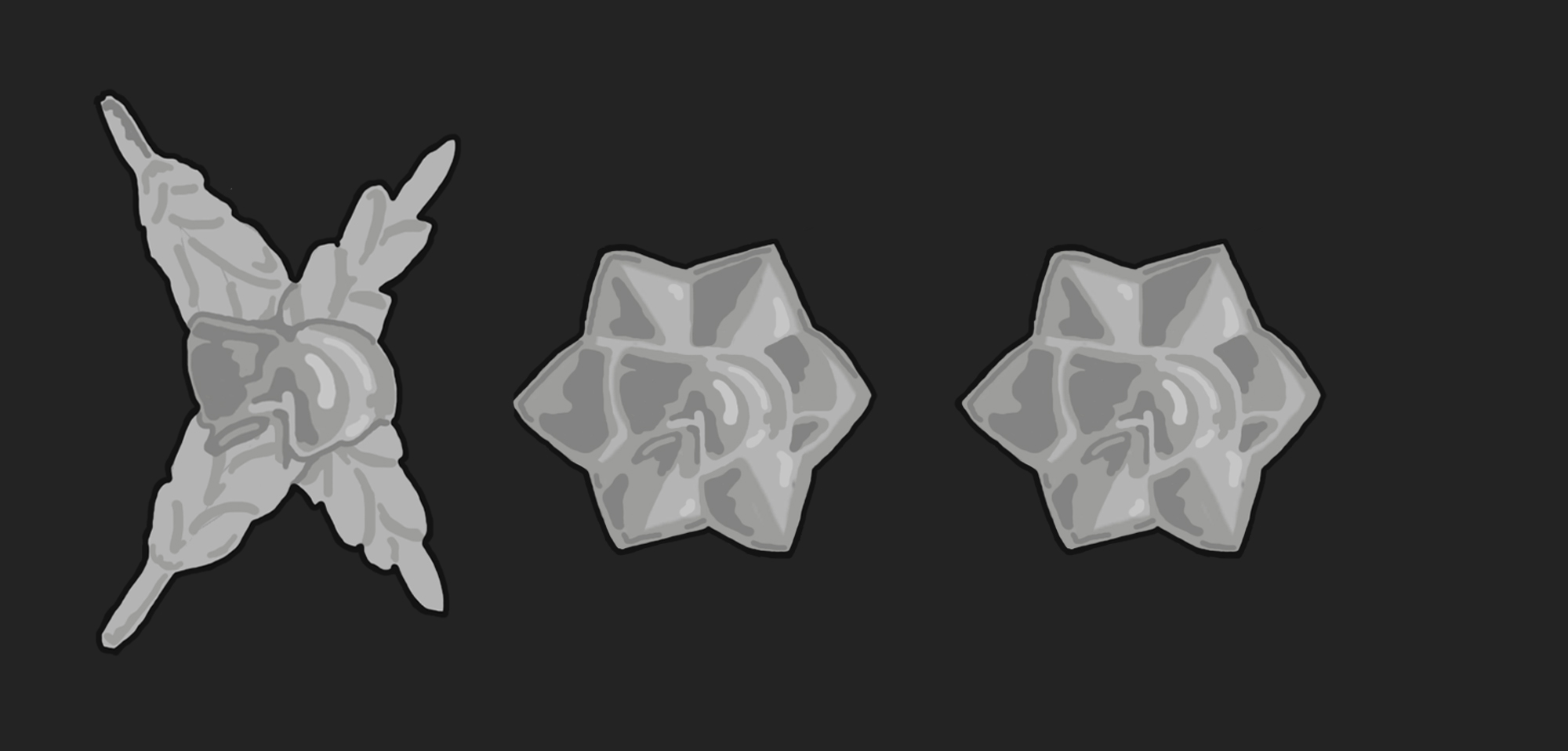
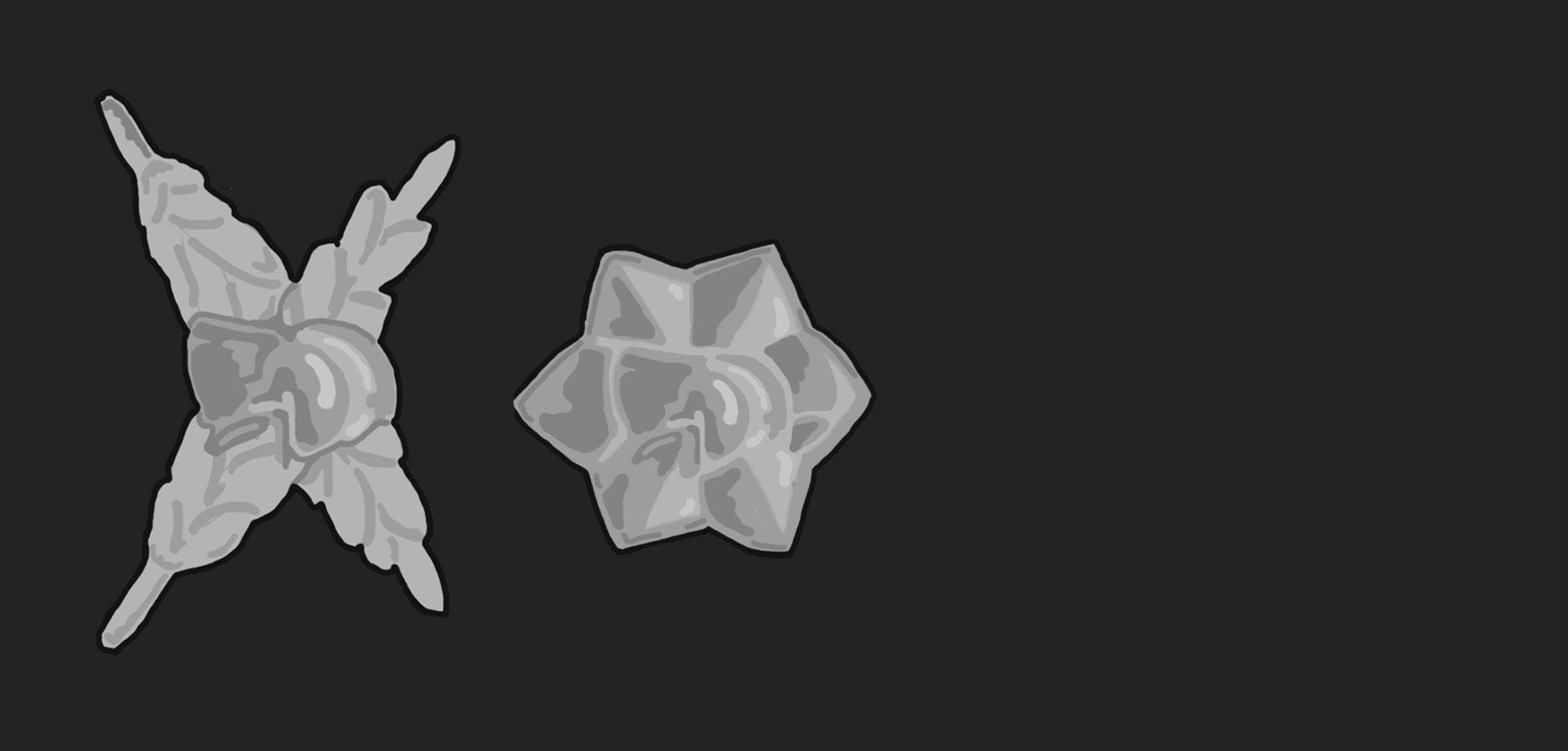
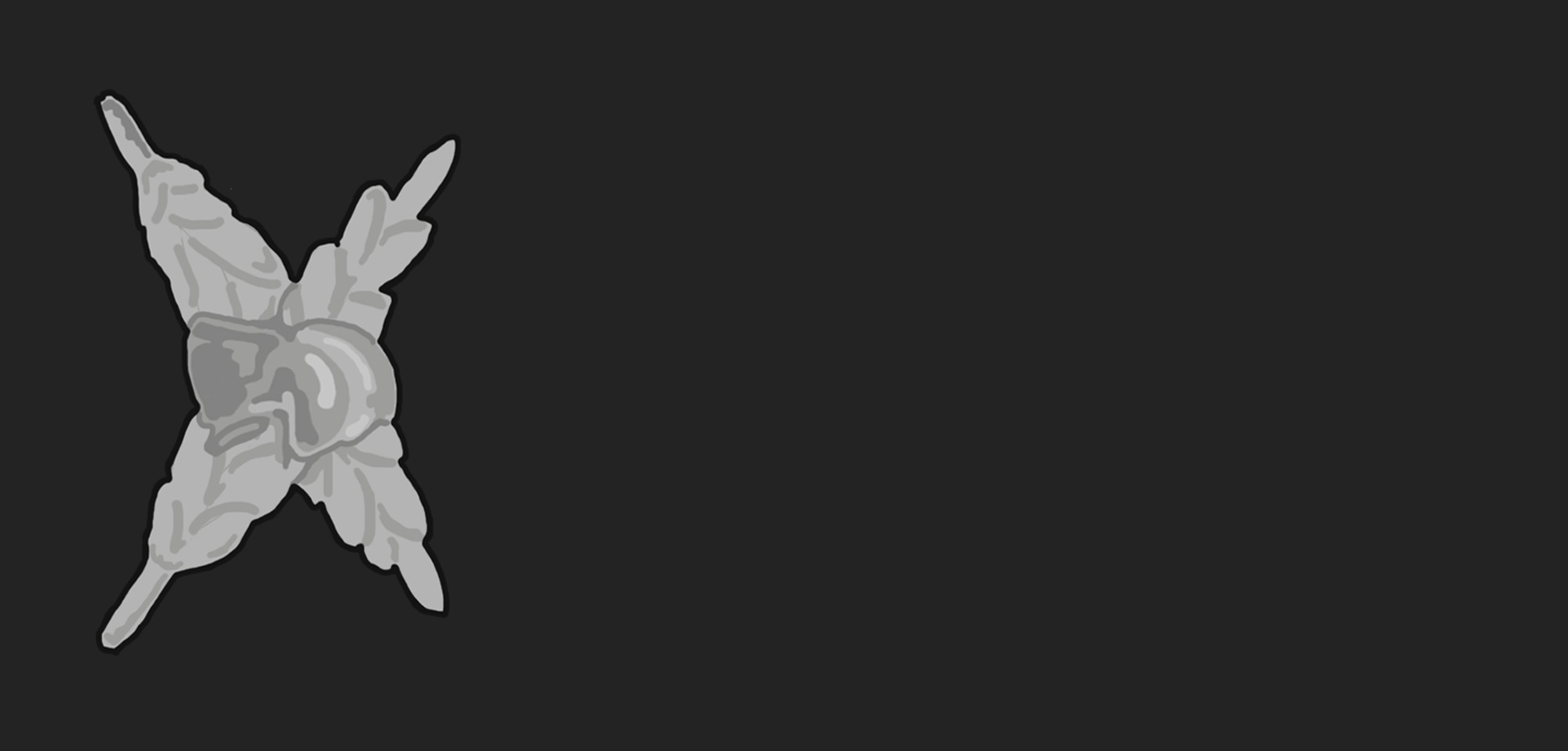
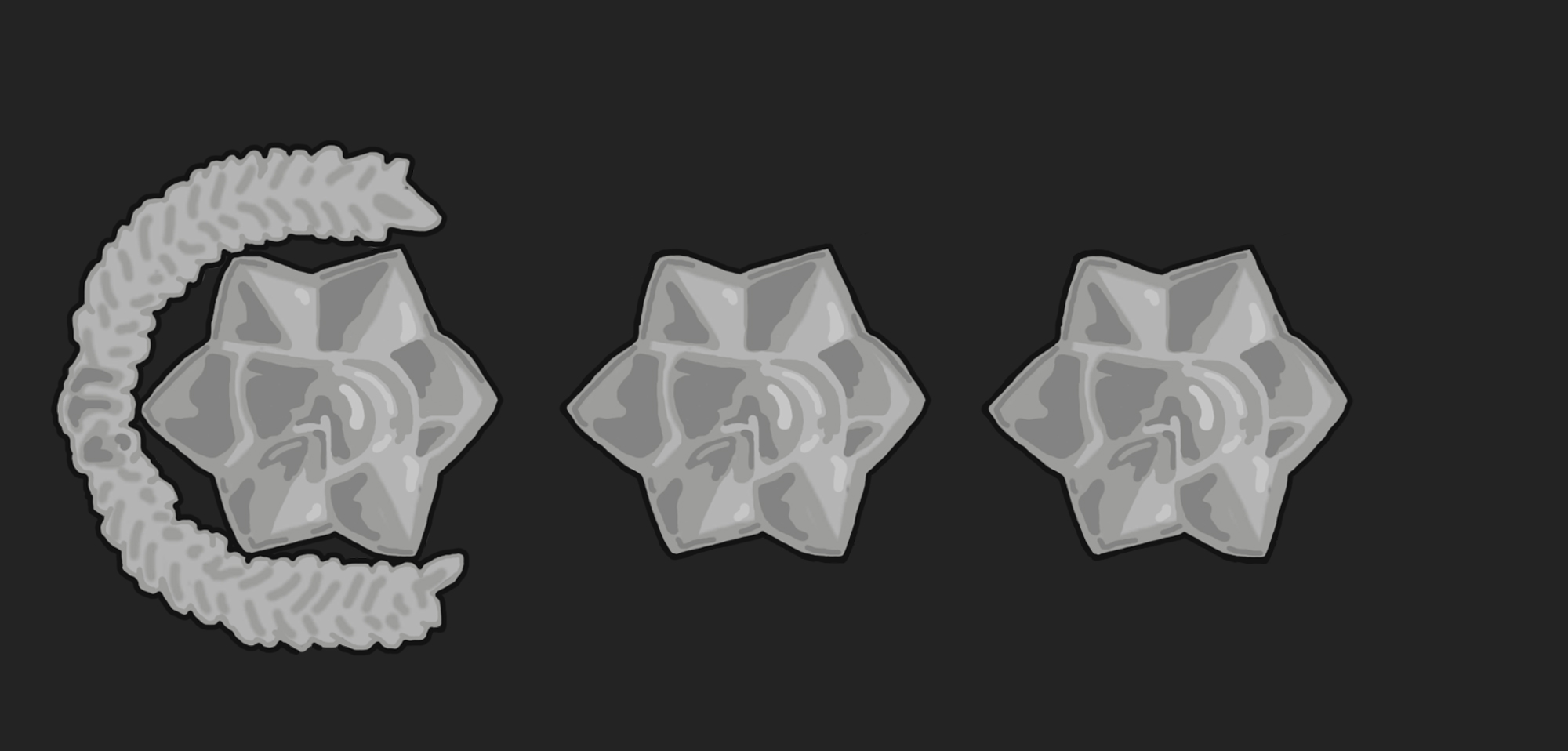
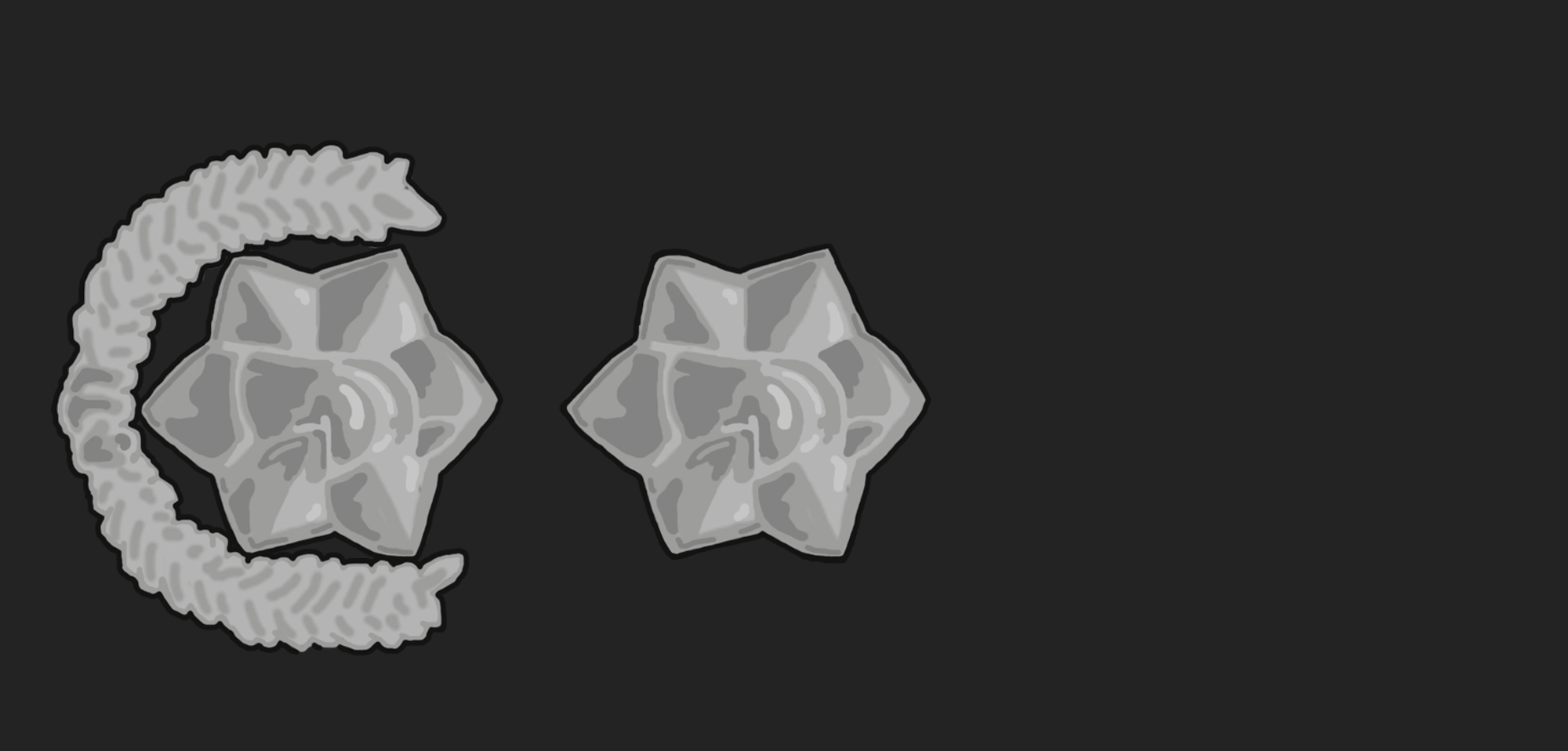
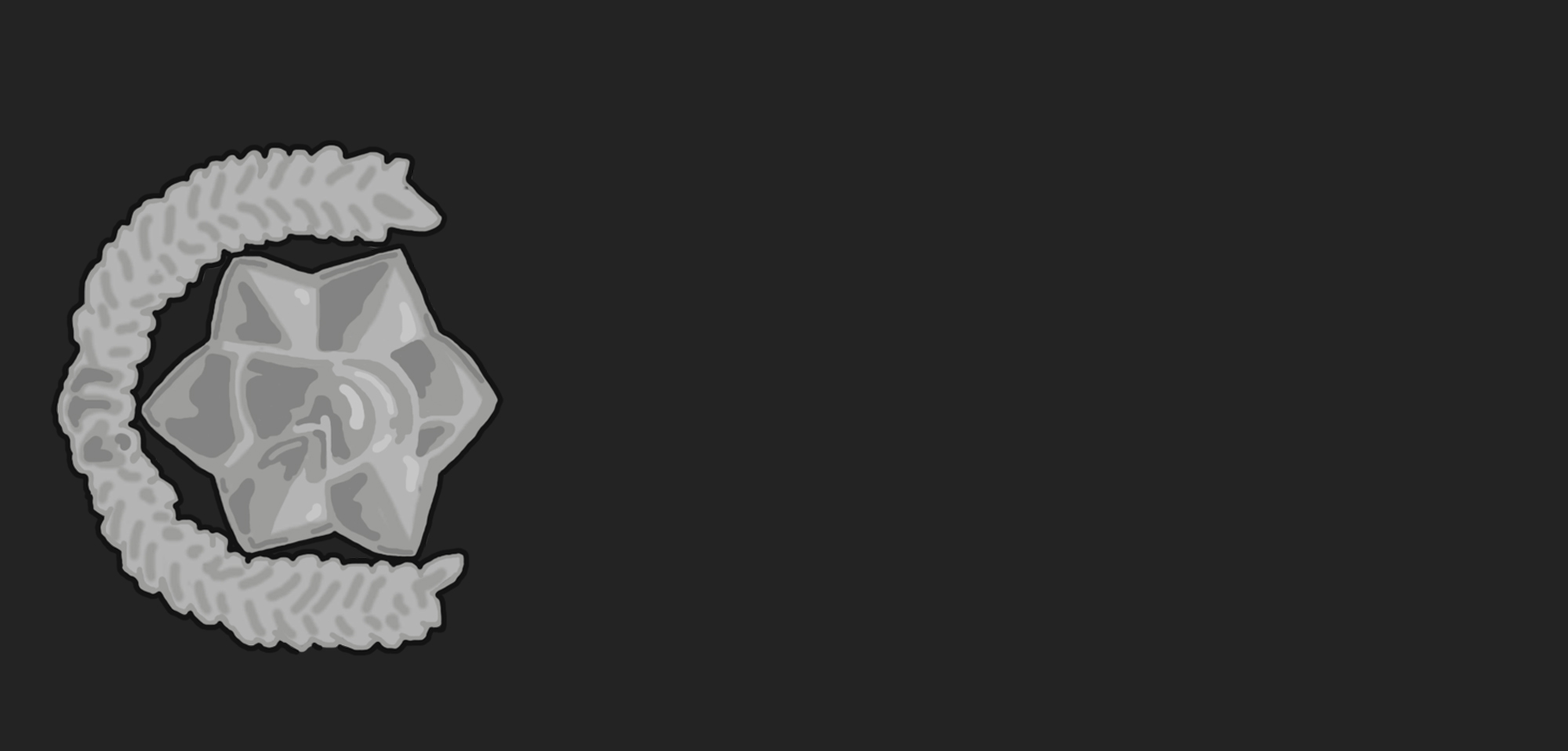
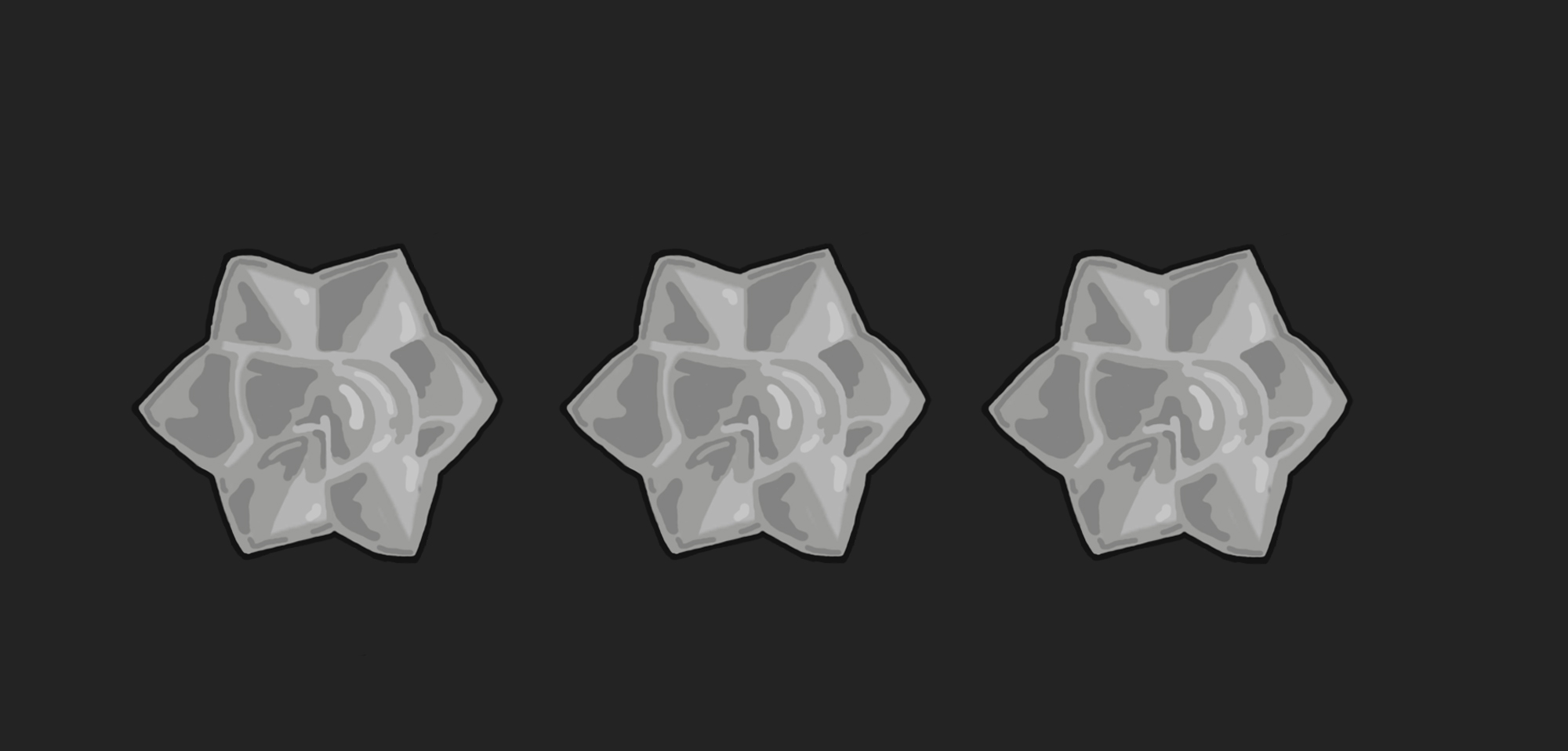
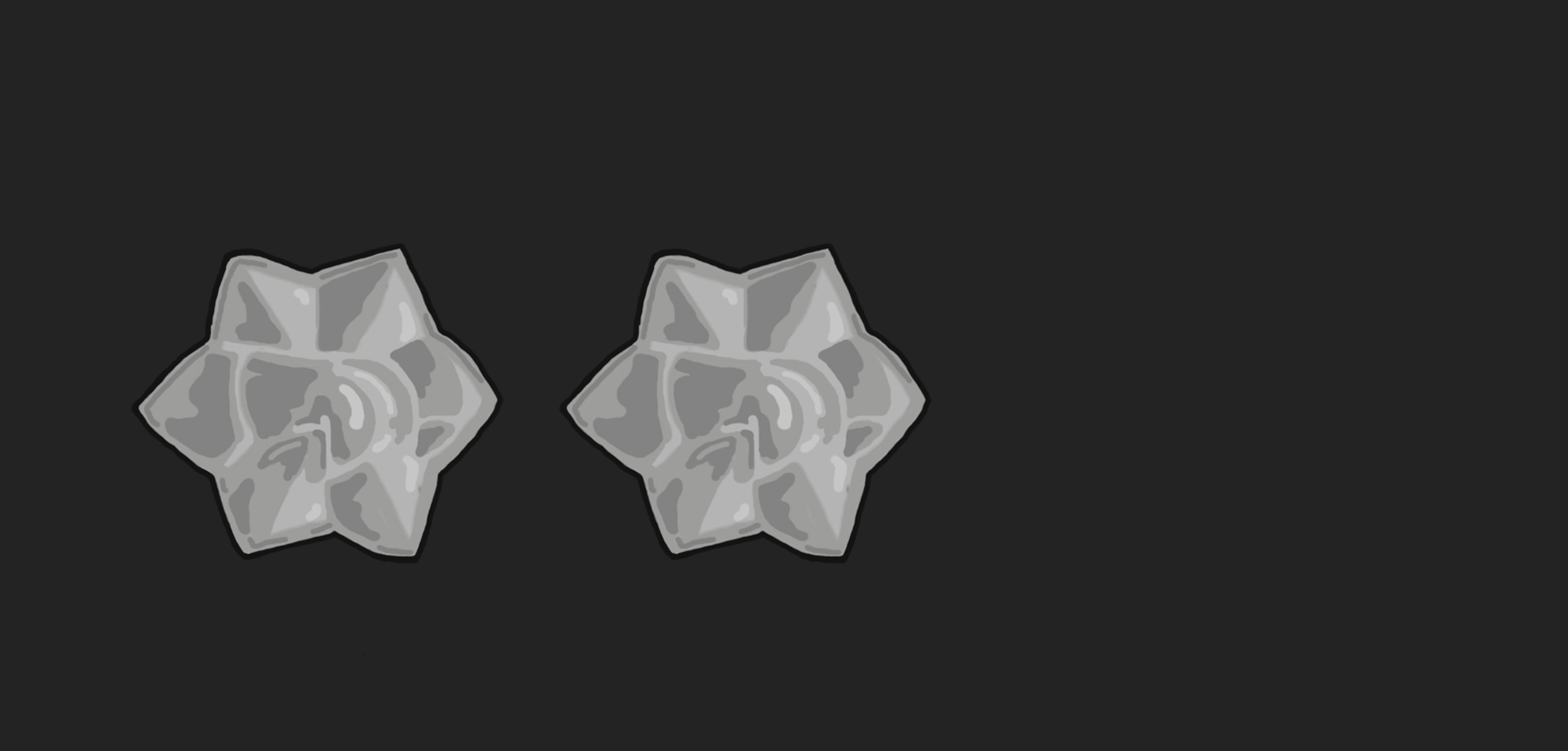
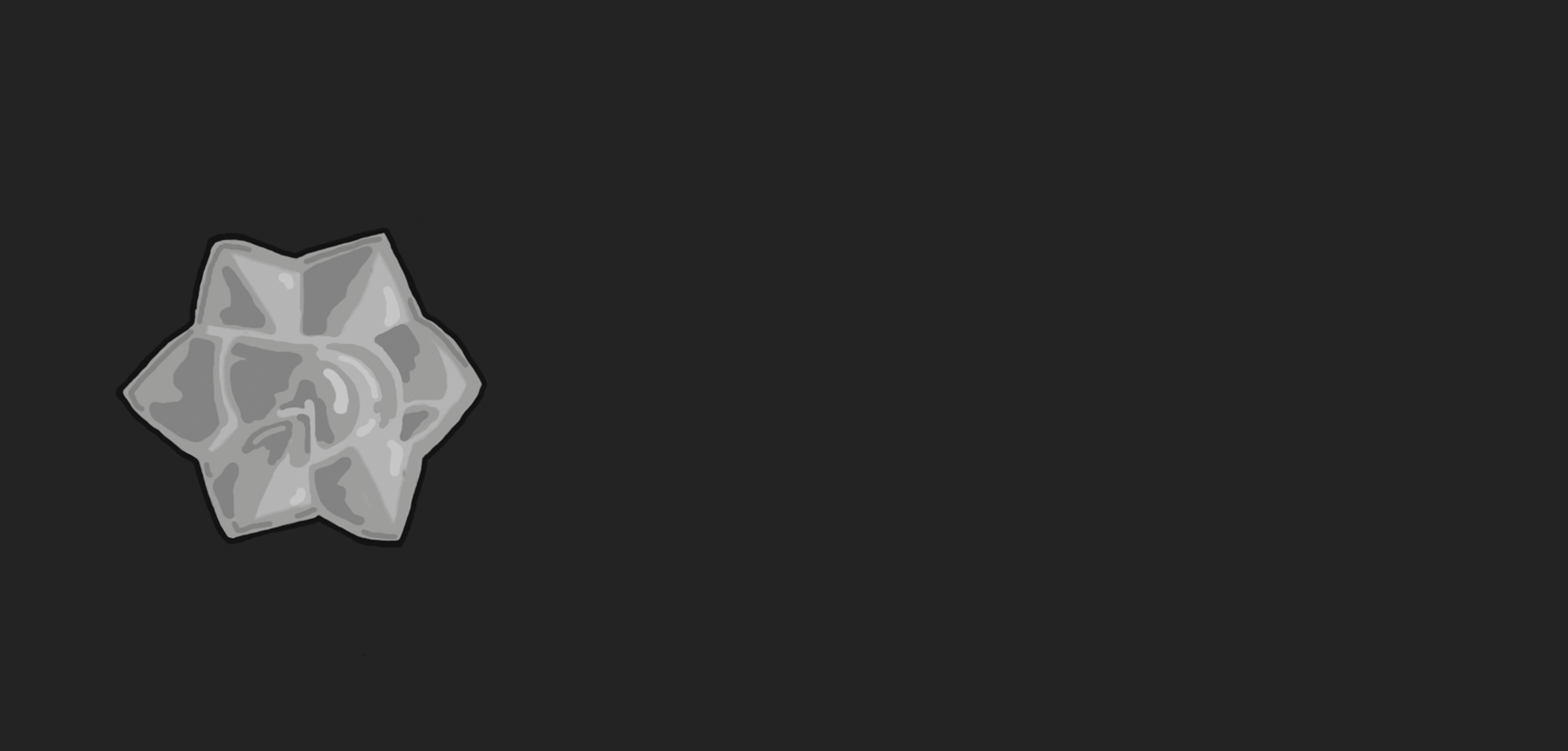
	Rav tafsar (רב טפסר)	Tafsar (טפסר)	Tat tafsar (תת טפסר)	Tafsar mishne (טפסר משנה)	Segan tafsar (סגן טפסר)	Ráv Reshef (רב רשף)	Reshef (רשף)	Lahav (להב)	Lahav mishne (להב משנה)
English	Lieutenant general firefighter	Major general firefighter	Brigadier general firefighter	Colonel firefighter	Lieutenant colonel firefighter	Major firefighter	Captain firefighter	First lieutenant firefighter	Second lieutenant firefighter

Other Ranks

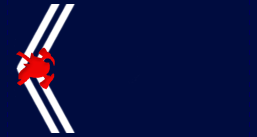
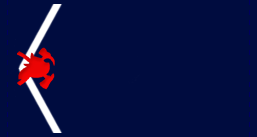
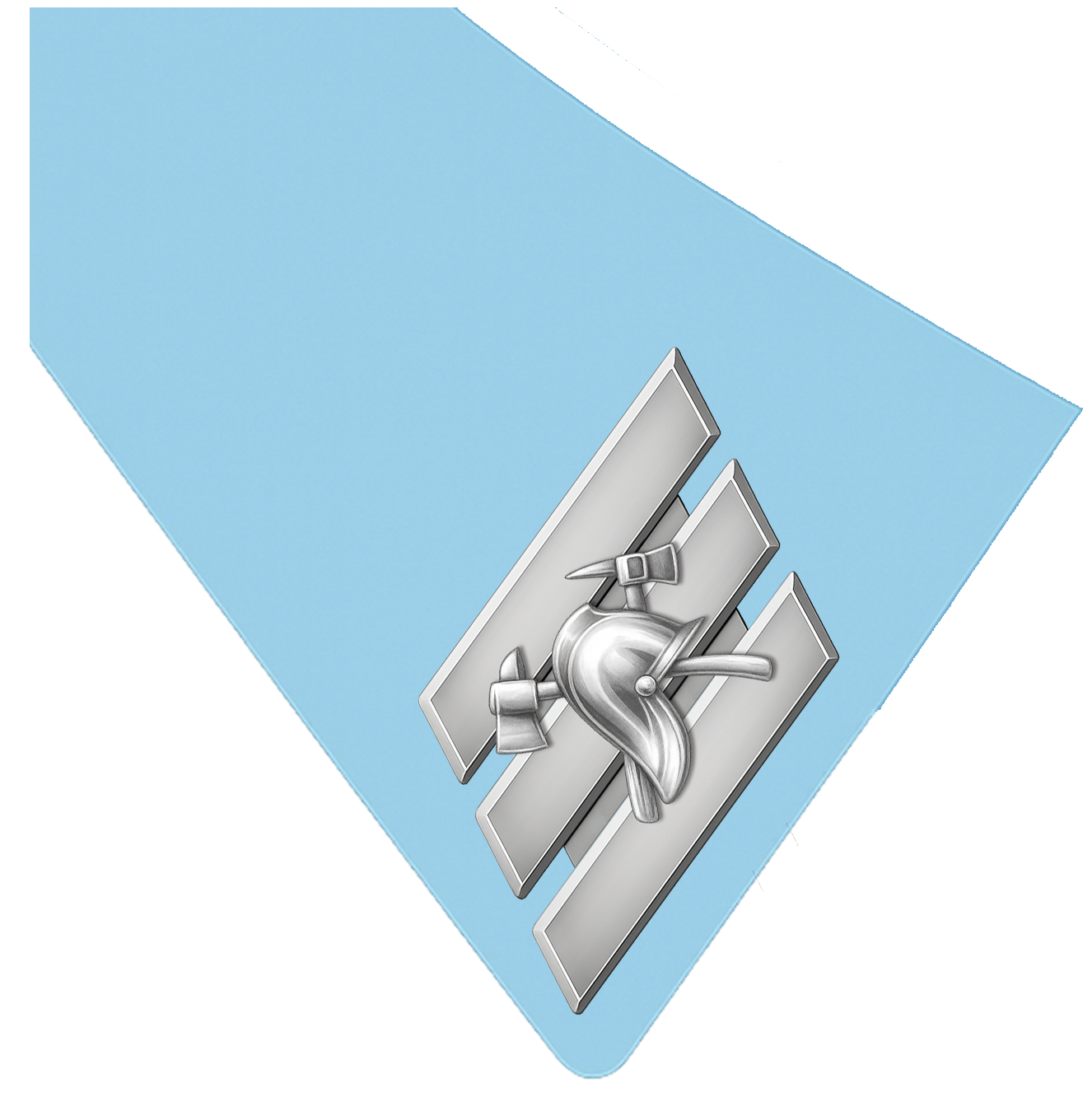
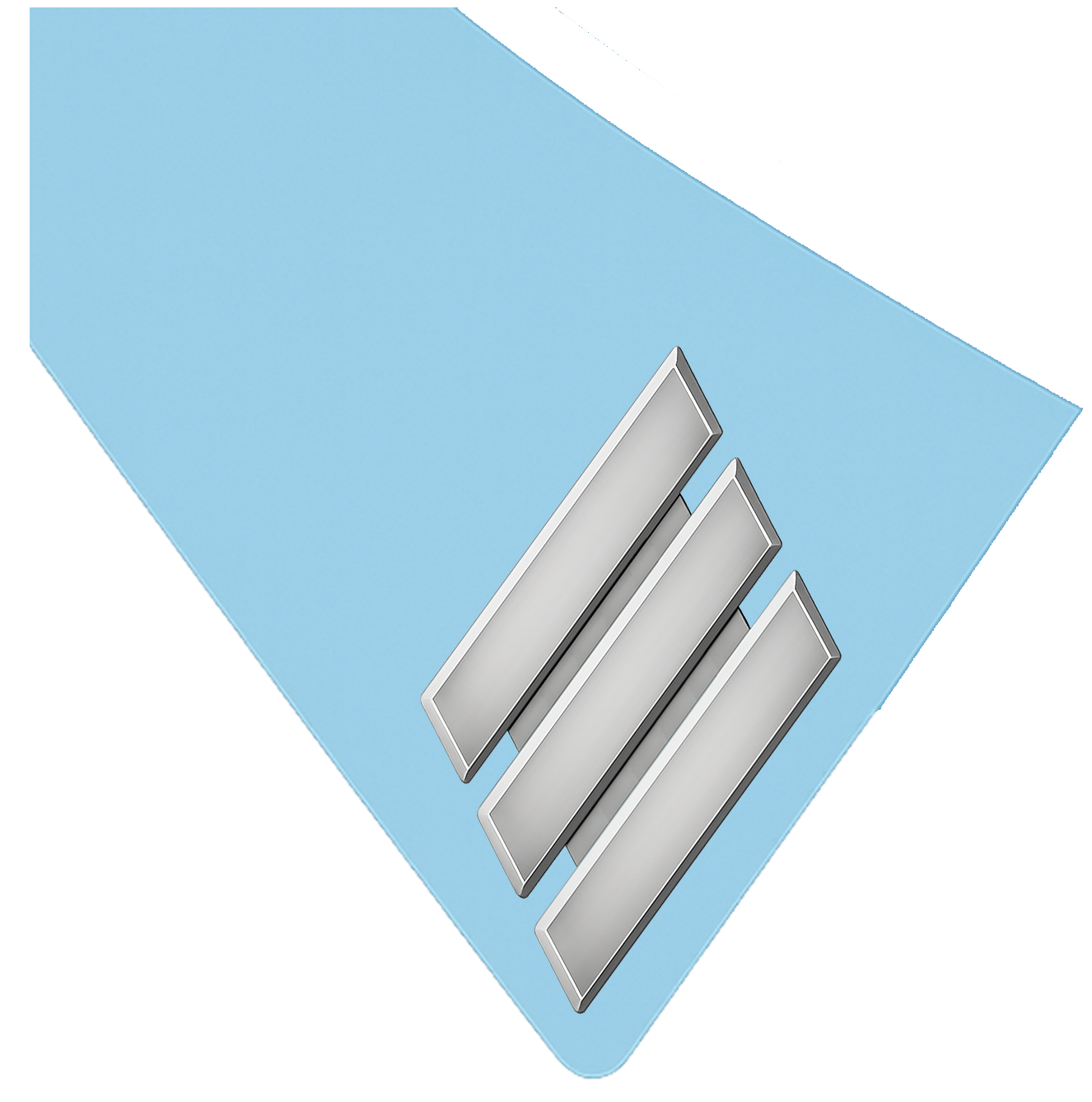
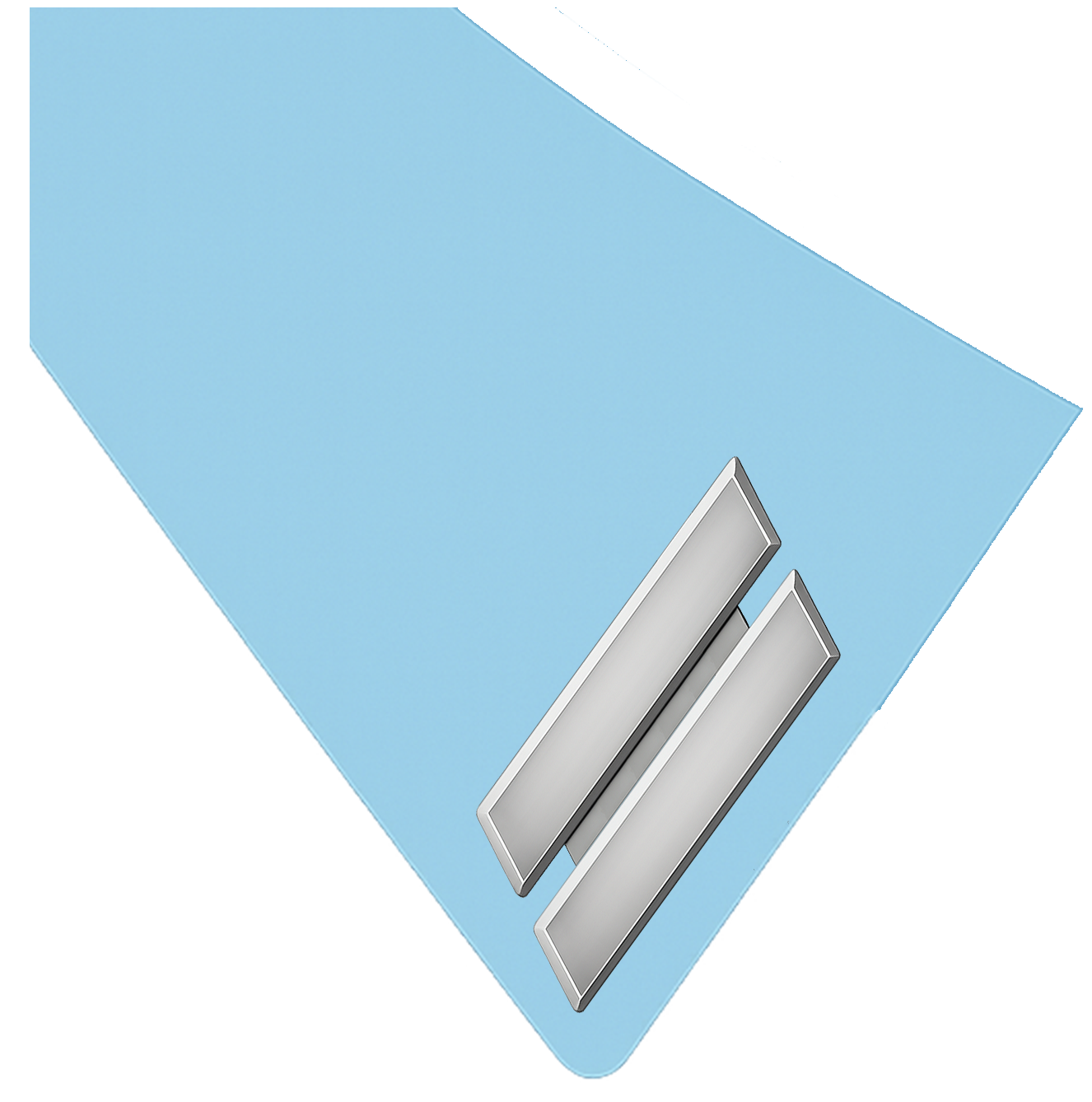
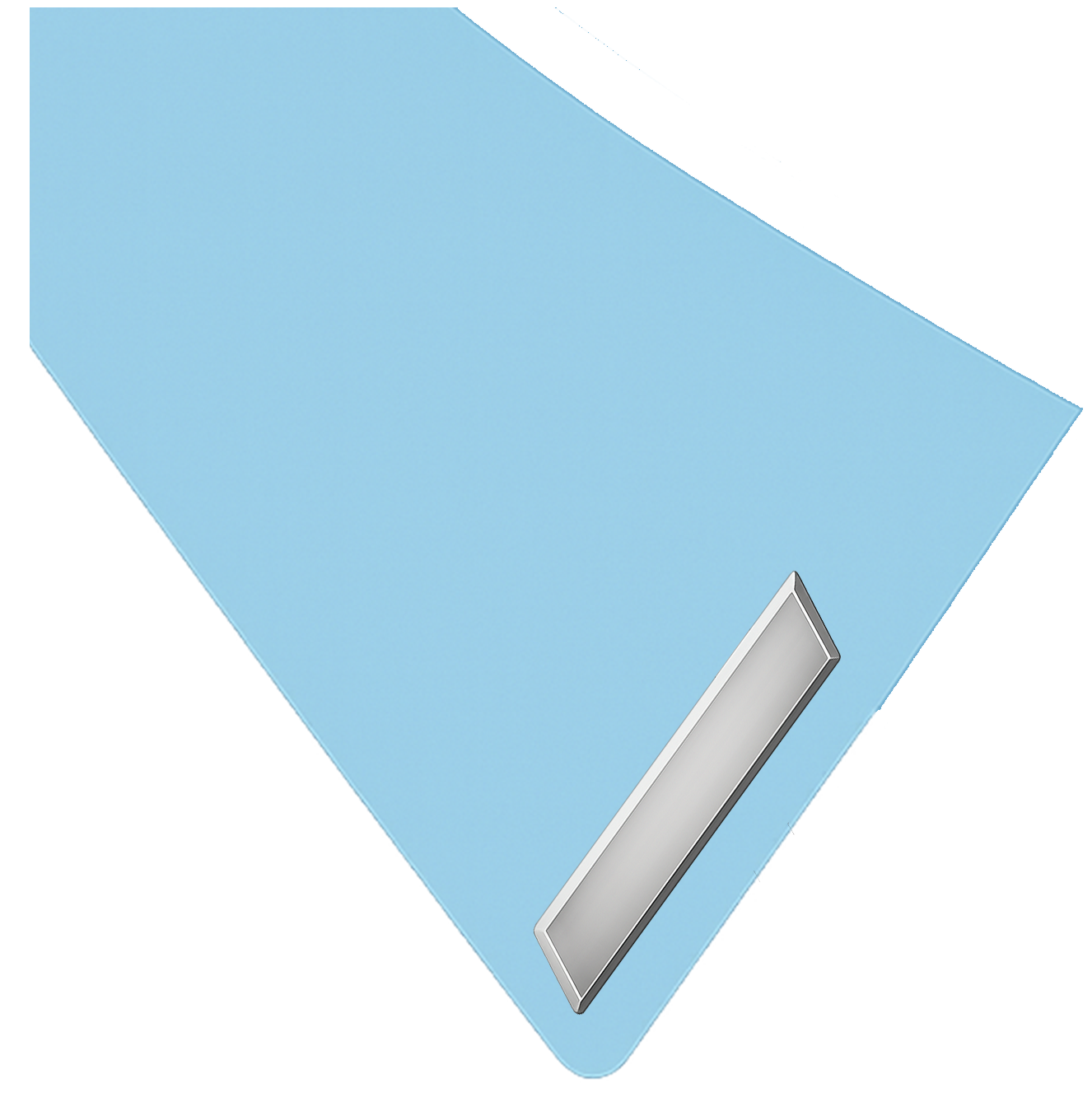
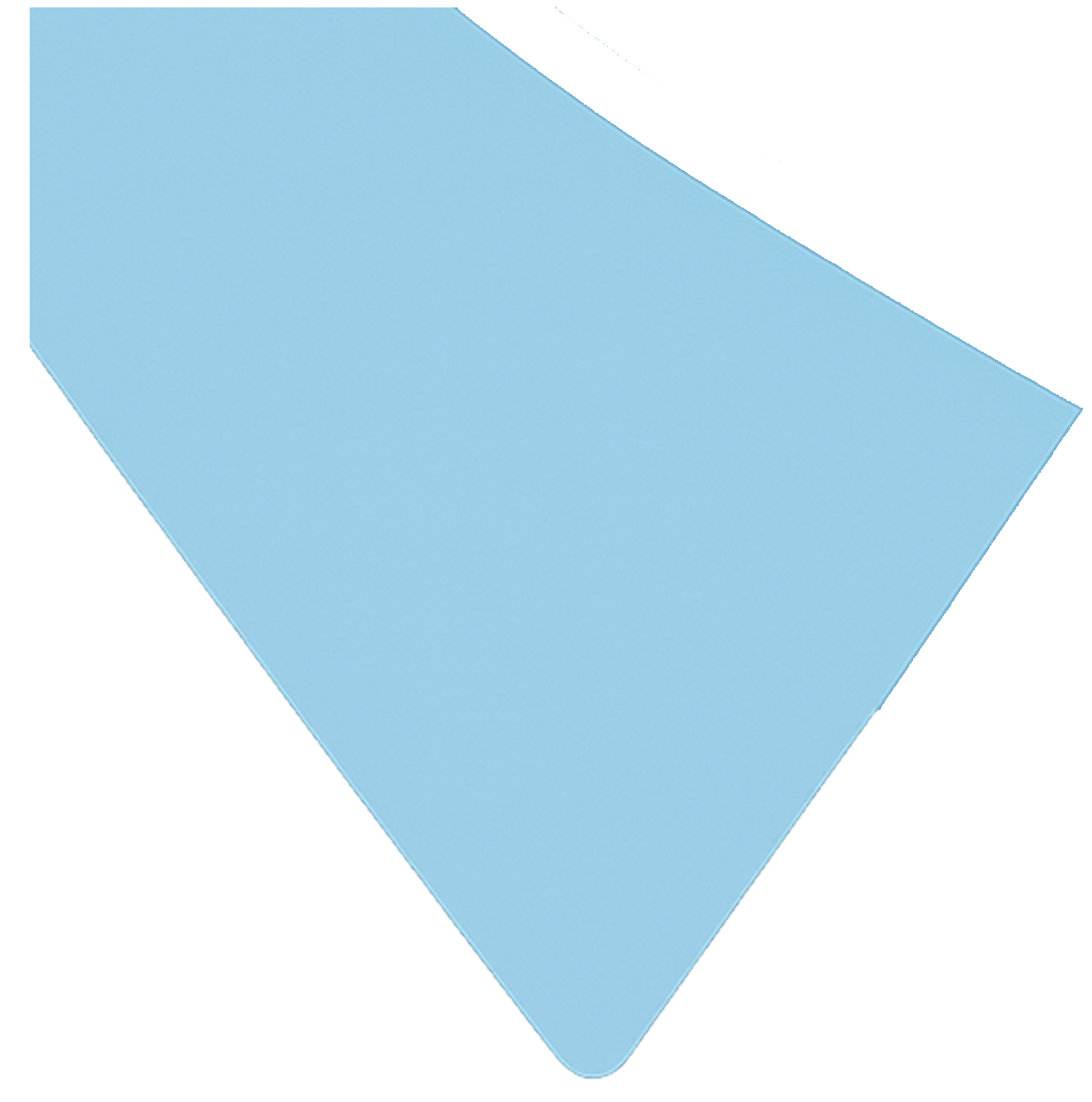
	Rav semel bakhir kabai (רב-סמל בכיר-כבאי)	Rav semel rishon kabai (רב-סמל ראשון-כבאי)	Rav semel kabai (רב-סמל-כבאי)	Semel kabai (סמל כבאי)	Rav kabai (רב כבאי)	Lokhem esh rishon (לוחם אש ראשון)	Lokhem esh (לוחם אש)
English	Sergeant major firefighter	Master sergeant firefighter	Sergeant 1st class firefighter	Sergeant firefighter	Corporal firefighter	Senior firefighter	Firefighter

== Italy ==
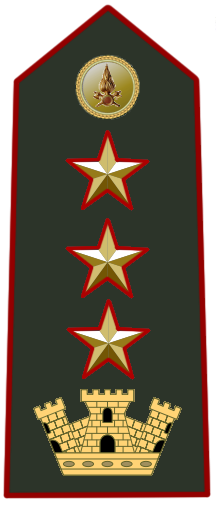
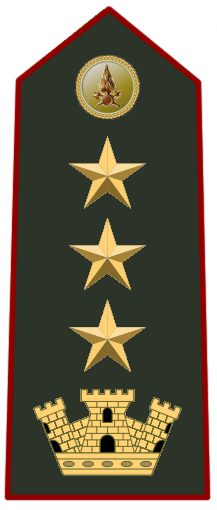
Chief fire officers
Dirigente generale Capo di corpo	Dirigente generale	Dirigente superiore di livello C	Dirigente superiore di livello D	Dirigente superiore di livello E	Dirigente superiore di livello F

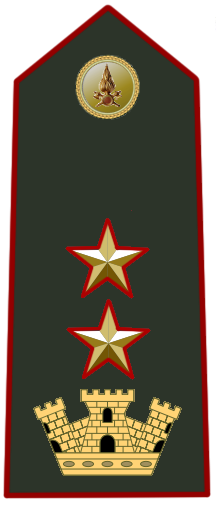
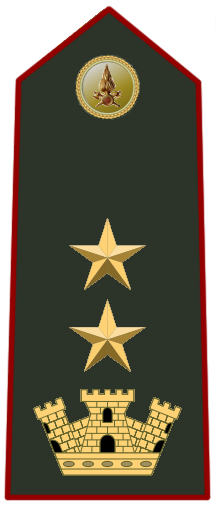
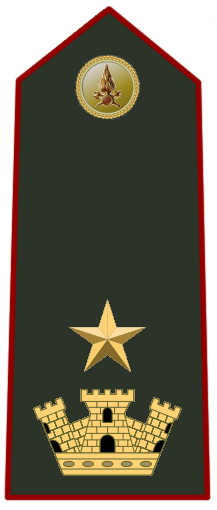
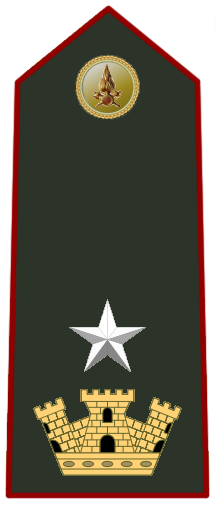
Senior Fire officers
Direttore vice dirigente con funzioni dei vicario dei dirigente di livello E	Direttore vice dirigente	Direttore	Vice direttore

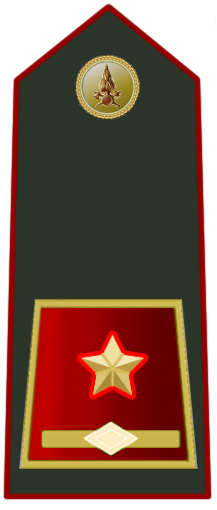
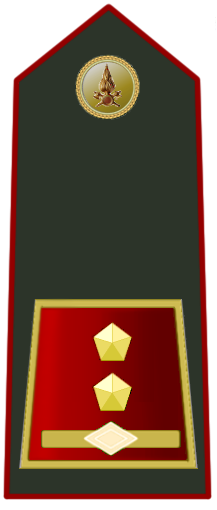
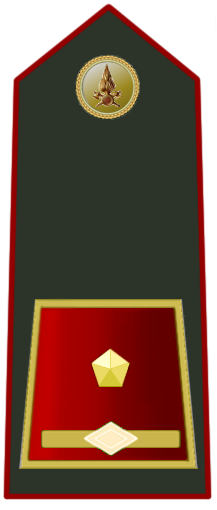
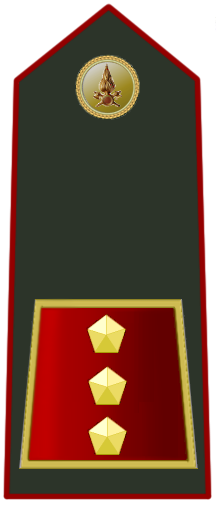
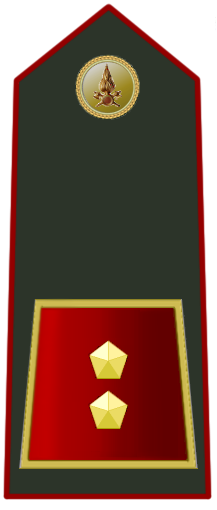
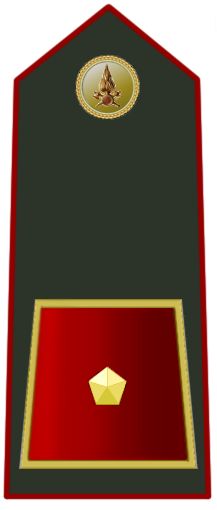
Station commanders
Sostituto direttore antincendi capo esperto	Sostituto direttore antincendi capo	Sostituto direttore antincendi	Ispettore antincendi coordinatore	Ispettore antincendi esperto	Ispettore antincendi

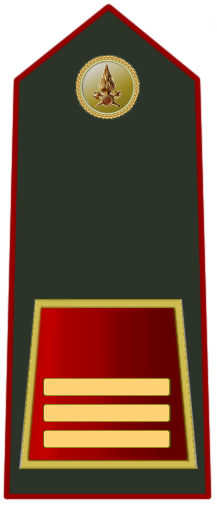
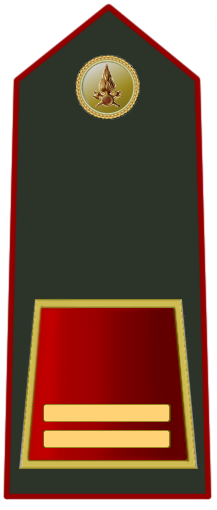
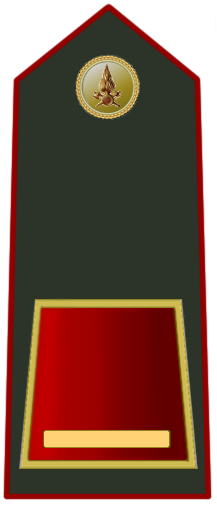
Crew commanders
Caporeparto	Caposquadra esperto	Caposquadra

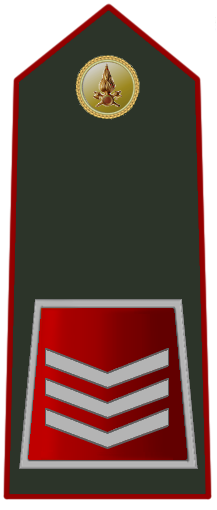
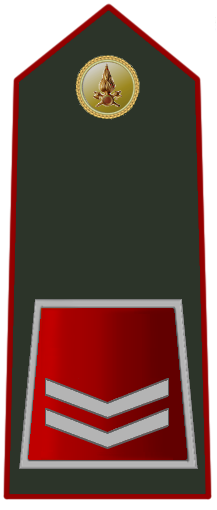
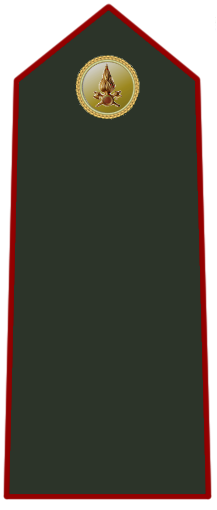
Firefighters
Vigile del fuoco coordinatore	Vigile del fuoco esperto	Vigile del fuoco

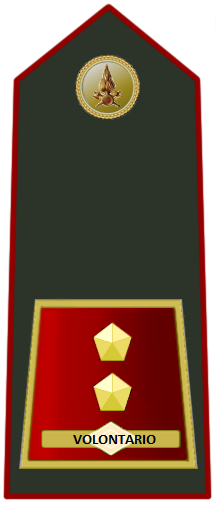
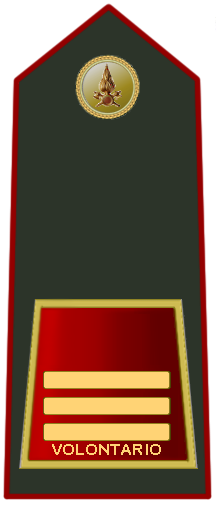
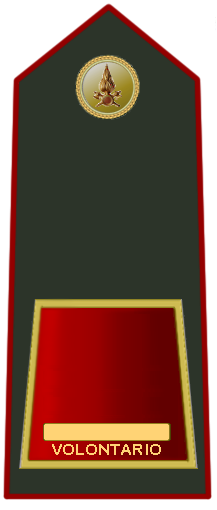
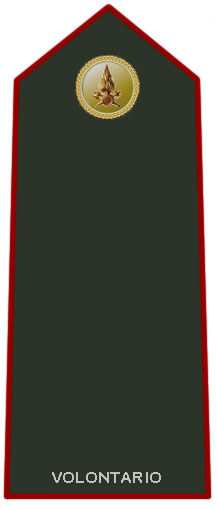
Volunteer firefighters
Funzionario tecnico antincendi volontario	Caporeparto volontario	Caposquadra volontario	Vigile del fuoco volontario

== Japan ==
=== Municipal fire departments ===
The rank structure and insignia of the career municipal fire departments of Japan are dictated in regulations published by the Fire and Disaster Management Agency, the nation's coordinating body for fire and rescue services. In formal and station wear, rank is indicated by a small rectangular badge, normally worn on the left breast, consisting of varying numbers of lines and stars (the star used on the badge is the Firefighter's Emblem of Japan), whereas in operational wear rank is normally indicated by bands on the headwear of varying number and thickness according to rank.

Rank	Roles in a department serving the special wards (Tokyo Fire Department)	Roles in a department serving a designated city or over 700,000 residents	Roles in a department serving 300,000 to 700,000 residents	Roles in a department serving 100,000 to 300,000 residents	Roles in a department serving less than 100,000 residents	Badge Insignia	Helmet Markings
Fire Chief (aka Fire Superintendent-General) Japanese: 消防総監 Hepburn: Shōbō sōkan	Chief of the Department						
Deputy Chief (aka Fire Chief Superintendent) Japanese: 消防司監 Hepburn: Shōbō shikan	Vice-Chief of the Department, HQ Chief of Division	Chief of the Department					
First Assistant Chief (aka Fire Senior Superintendent) Japanese:消防正監 Hepburn: Shōbō seikan	HQ Chief of Division, District Chief	Vice-Chief of the Department, HQ Chief of Division, Station Chief	Chief of the Department				
Assistant Chief (aka Fire Superintendent) Japanese:消防監 Hepburn: Shōbō kan	Counsellor of the Department, HQ Chief of Section, Station Chief	HQ Chief of Section, Station Vice-Chief	Vice-Chief of the Department, HQ Chief of Division, Station Chief	Chief of the Department			
Battalion Chief (aka Fire Senior Commander) Japanese:消防司令長 Hepburn: Shōbō shirei-chō	HQ/Station Chief of Section, Vice-Counsellor of the Department, Station Vice-Chief	HQ/Station Chief of Section, Battalion Commander	HQ Chief of Section, Station Vice-Chief, Battalion Commander	Vice-Chief of the Department, HQ/Station Chief of Section, Station Chief	Chief of the Department		
Fire Captain (aka Fire Commander) Japanese: 消防司令 Hepburn: Shōbō shirei	HQ/Station Assistant Chief of Section, HQ/Station Chief of Subsection, Battalion Commander	HQ Assistant Chief of Section, HQ/Station Chief of Subsection, Company Commander	HQ/Station Assistant Chief of Section, HQ Chief of Subsection, Company Commander, Platoon Commander	HQ/Station Assistant Chief of Section	Vice-Chief of the Department, HQ Chief of Section, HQ Assistant Chief of Section, Station Chief, Station-Vice Chief, Battalion Commander		
Fire Lieutenant (aka Fire Assistant Commander) Japanese: 消防司令補 Hepburn: Shōbō shirei-ho	HQ/Station Senior Staff, Company Commander, Platoon Commander	HQ Senior Staff, HQ Chief Examiner, Station Chief of Subsection, Platoon Commander	HQ/Station Chief Examiner, Station Chief of Subsection	HQ/Station Chief of Subsection, Company Commander	HQ/Station Chief of Subsection, Company Commander, Platoon Commander		
Fire Sergeant (aka Firefighter Chief) Japanese: 消防士長 H Hepburn: Shōbō shichō	HQ Assistant Senior Staff, Station Team Leader, Station Team Member	HQ Assistant Senior Staff, Station Team Leader, Station Team Member	HQ/Station Senior Staff, Station Team Leader, Station Team Member	HQ/Station Chief Examiner, Platoon Commander	HQ/Station Chief of Subsection, HQ/Station Chief Examiner, Platoon Commander		
Assistant Fire Sergeant (aka Assistant Firefighter Chief) Japanese: 消防副士長 Hepburn: Shōbō fuku-shichō	HQ Team Member, Station Team Leader, Station Team Member	HQ Team Member, Station Team Leader, Station Team Member	HQ Assistant Senior Staff, Station Team Leader, Station Team Member	HQ/Station Assistant Chief Examiner	HQ/Station Senior Staff		
Firefighter Japanese: 消防士 Hepburn: Shōbō shi	HQ Team Member, Station Team Leader, Station Team Member	HQ Team Member, Station Team Leader, Station Team Member	HQ Team Member, Station Team Leader, Station Team Member	HQ Team Member, Station Team Leader, Station Team Member	HQ Team Member, Station Team Leader, Station Team Member		

=== Volunteer fire corps ===
The rank structure and insignia of the reserve volunteer fire corps of Japan are also dictated by the Fire and Disaster Management Agency. As with the career departments, in formal and station wear, rank is indicated by a small rectangular badge, normally worn on the left breast, consisting of varying numbers of lines and stars (the star used on the badge in this case is the Volunteer Fire Corps Emblem of Japan), whereas in operational wear rank is normally indicated by bands on the headwear of varying number and thickness according to rank.

Rank	Volunteer Fire Chief Japanese: 団長 Hepburn: Danchō	Volunteer Assistant Fire Chief Japanese: 副団長 Hepburn: Fuku danchō	Volunteer Squad Chief Japanese: 分団長 Hepburn: Bun danchō	Volunteer Assistant Squad Chief Japanese: 副分団長 Hepburn: Fuku-bun danchō	Volunteer Company Chief Japanese: 部長 Hepburn: Buchō	Volunteer Crew Chief Japanese: 班長 Hepburn: Hanchō	Volunteer Firefighter Japanese: 団員 Hepburn: Dan'in
Badge Insignia							
Helmet Markings							

== Luxembourg ==
Higher cadre of professional and volunteer fire fighters Cadre supérieur des pompiers volontaires et professionnels
Insignia								
French	Directeur général	Colonel	Lieutenant-colonel	Major	Capitaine	Lieutenant 1ère classe	Lieutenant	Lieutenant-aspirant
English	Director general	Colonel	Lieutenant colonel	Major	Captain	Lieutenant 1st class	Lieutenant	Aspirant lieutenant

Middle cadre of professional and volunteer fire fighters Cadre moyen des pompiers volontaires et professionnels
Insignia				
French	Adjudant-major	Adjudant-chef	Adjudant	Adjudant-aspirant
English	Chief warrant officer	Master warrant officer	Warrant officer	Aspirant warrant officer

Basic cadre of professional and volunteer fire fighters Cadre de base des pompiers volontaires et professionnels
Insignia								
French	Sergent-major	Sergent-chef	Sergent	Caporal-chef 1ère classe	Caporal-chef	Caporal	Brigadier	Brigadier-aspirant
English	Sergeant major	Master sergeant	Sergeant	Master corporal 1st class	Master corporal	Corporal	Brigadier	Aspirant brigadier

== Malaysia ==
No.	Rank	Abbreviation	Rank (English)	Grade	Epaulet	
No.	Rank	Abbreviation	Rank (English)	Grade	Shoulder board	Collar badge
Penguasa Bomba (fire superintendent)
1	Ketua Pesuruhjaya Bomba	KPjB	Chief fire commissioner	JUSA A		
2	Pesuruhjaya Bomba	PjB	Fire commissioner	JUSA B		
3	Timbalan Pesuruhjaya Bomba	TPjB	Deputy fire commissioner	JUSA C		
4	Penolong Kanan Pesuruhjaya Bomba	PKPjB	Senior assistant fire commissioner	KB 54		
5	Penolong Pesuruhjaya Bomba	PPjB	Assistant fire commissioner	KB 52		
6	Penguasa Kanan Bomba I	PgKB I	Senior fire superintendent I	KB 48		
7	Penguasa Kanan Bomba II	PgKB II	Senior fire superintendent II	KB 44		
8	Penguasa Bomba	PgB	Fire superintendent	KB 41		
Penolong Penguasa Bomba (assistant fire superintendent)
9	Timbalan Penguasa Bomba	TPgB	Deputy fire superintendent	KB 38		
10	Penolong Kanan Penguasa Bomba	PKPgB	Senior assistant fire superintendent	KB 32		
11	Penolong Penguasa Bomba	PPgB	Assistant fire superintendent	KB 29		
Pegawai Bomba (fire officer)
12	Pegawai Bomba Tinggi	PBT	Leading fire officer	KB 26		
13	Pegawai Bomba Kanan I	PBK I	Senior fire officer I	KB 24		
14	Pegawai Bomba Kanan II	PBK II	Senior fire officer II	KB 22		
15	Pegawai Bomba	PB	Fire officer	KB 17 / 19	No insignia	

== Netherlands ==
Hoofdcommandeur	Fire chief
Adjunct-Hoofdcommandeur	Deputy fire chief
Commandeur	Division chief
Hoofdbrandmeester	Battalion chief
Brandmeester	Captain
Hoofdbrandwacht	Engineer
Brandwacht	Fire fighter
Algemene / Aspirantfuncties	Trainee

== New Zealand ==
In New Zealand, rank is shown on epaulettes on firefighters' station uniform, and through colours and stripes on firefighter helmets. As the nation only has a single fire service, Fire and Emergency New Zealand, ranks are consistent through the country.

Rank	Epaulette	Helmet
Recruit firefighter (RFF)	Blank with "RECRUIT"	Fluro-green
Firefighter (FF)		Yellow, one white stripe
Qualified firefighter (QFF)		Yellow, one red stripe
Senior firefighter (SFF)		Yellow, two red stripes
Station officer (SO)		Red, one blue stripe
Senior station officer (SSO)		Red, two blue stripes
Deputy chief fire officer (DCFO)		White, one blue stripe and Deputy Chief Fire Officer label
Chief fire officer (CFO)		White, two blue stripes and Chief Fire Officer label
Assistant Commander (AC)		Silver, Assistant Commander label
Commander (CD)		Silver, one blue stripe, Commander label
Assistant national commander (ANC)		Silver, two blue stripes, Assistant National Commander label
Deputy national commander (DNC)		Black, Deputy National Commander label
National commander (NC)		Black, National Commander label

== Nicaragua ==
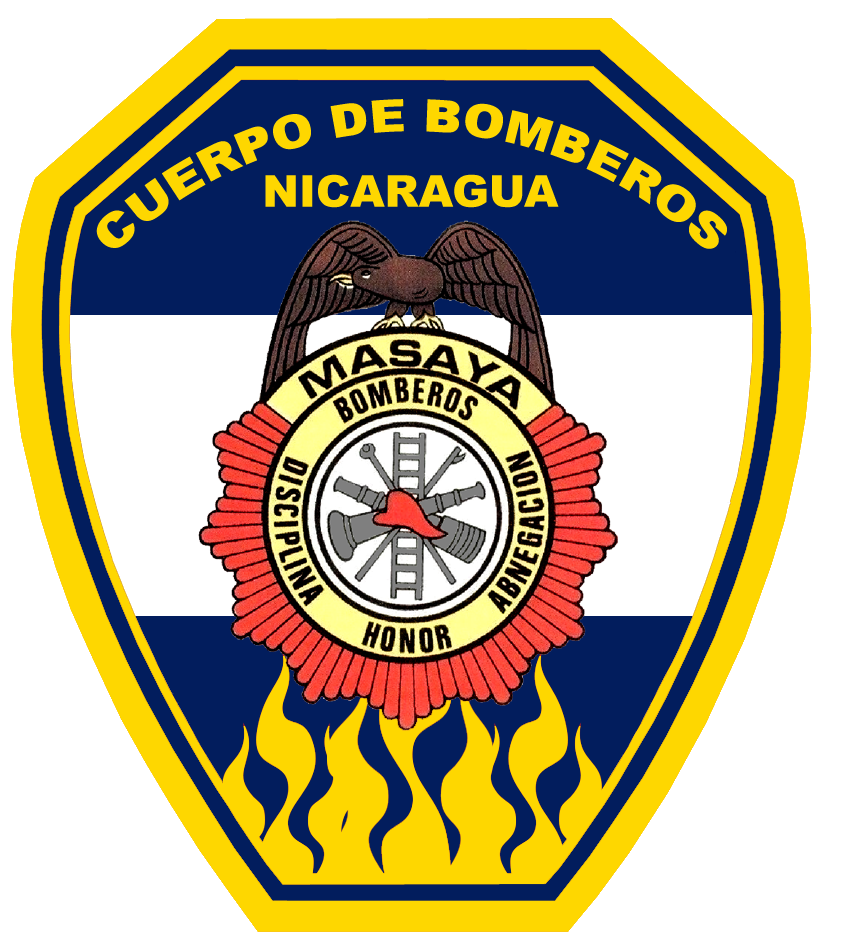
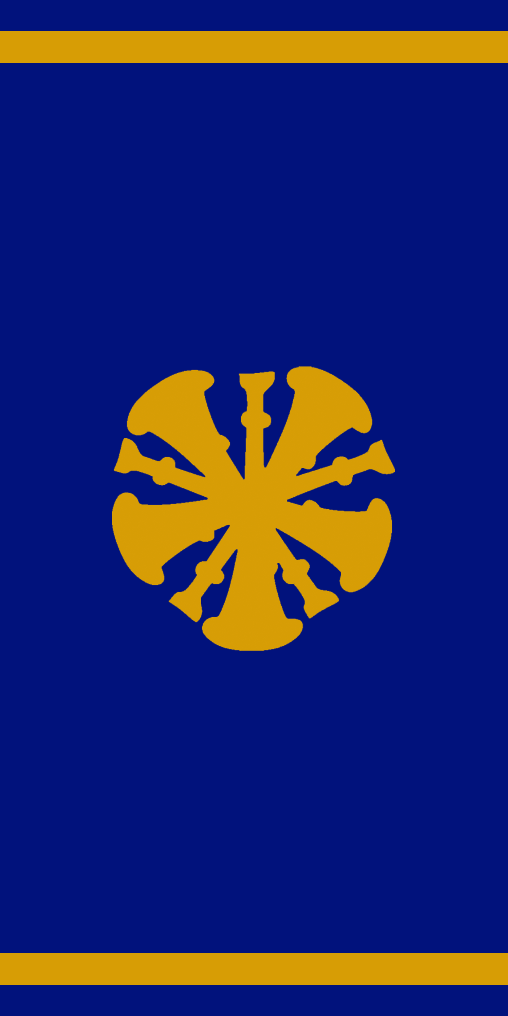
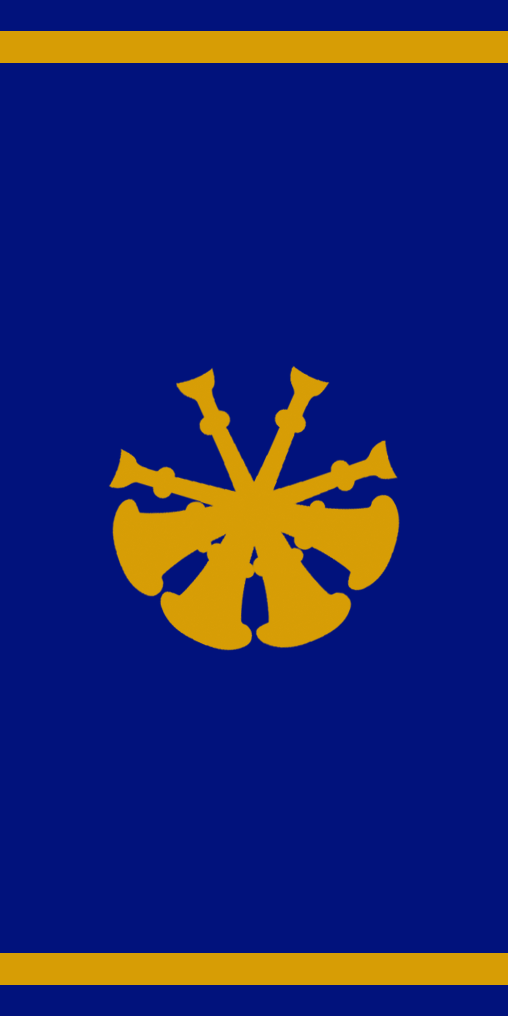
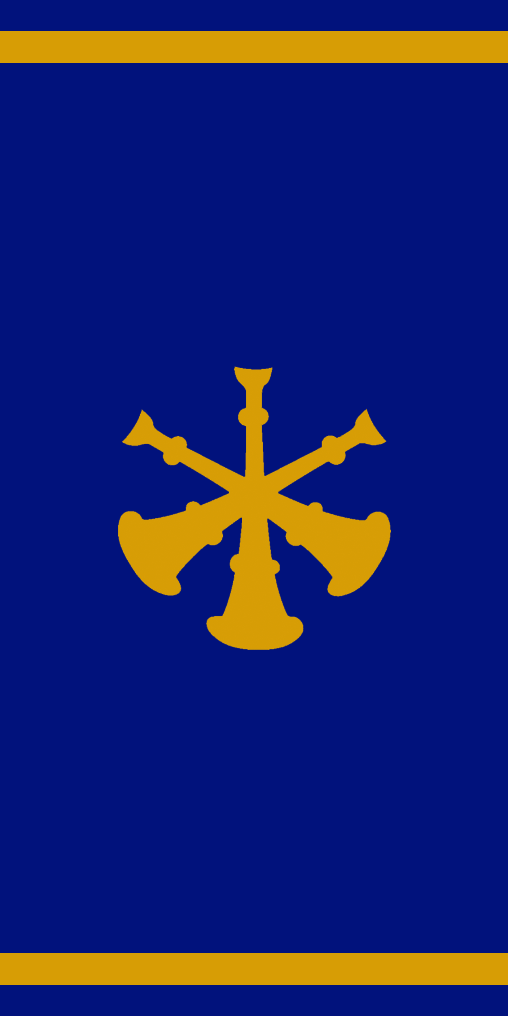
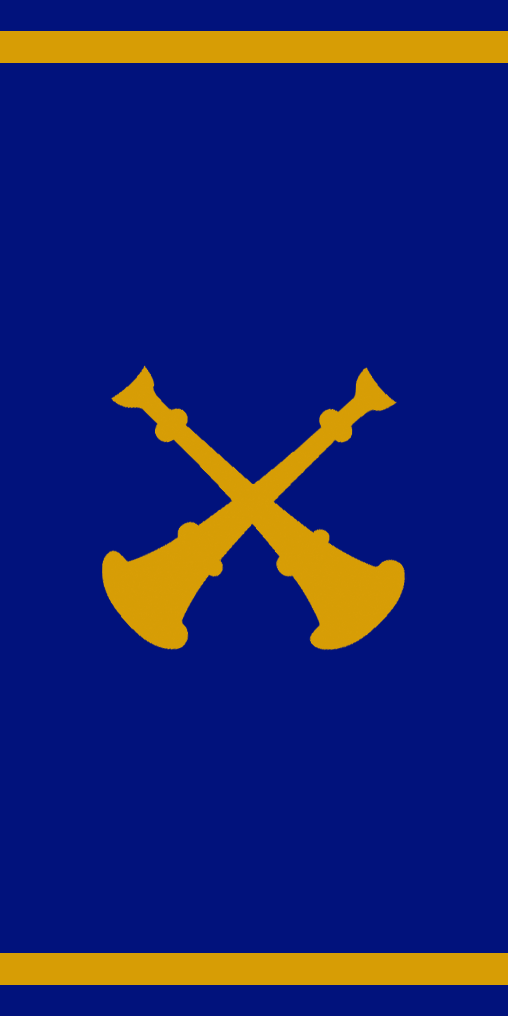
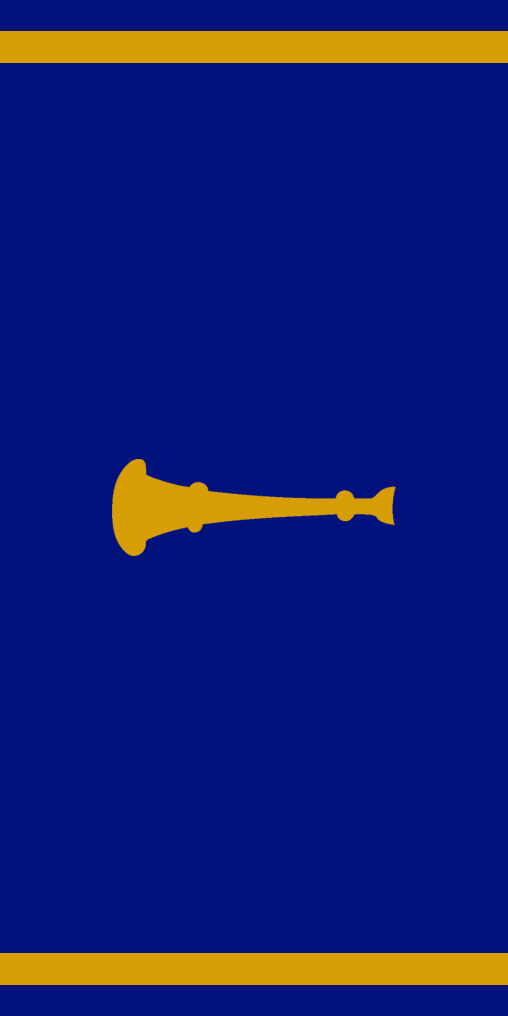
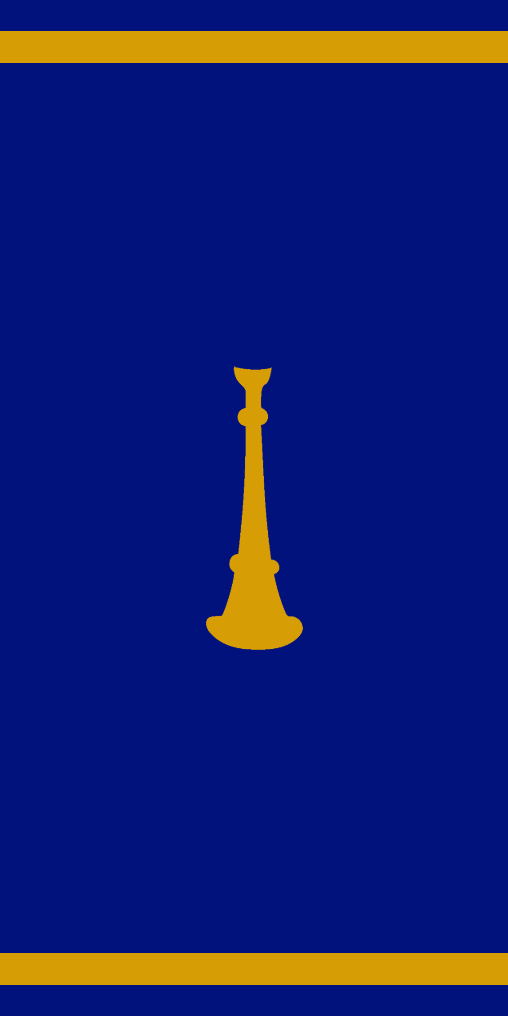
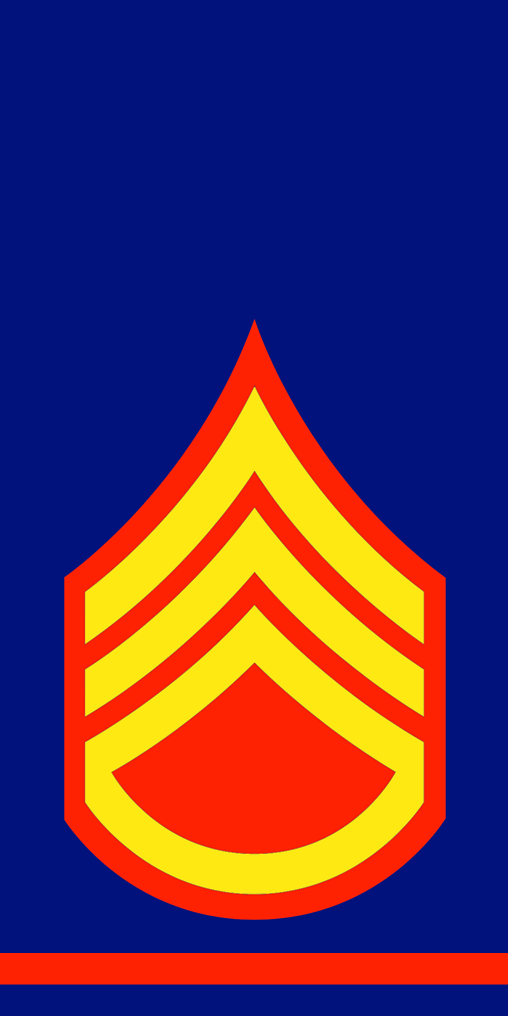
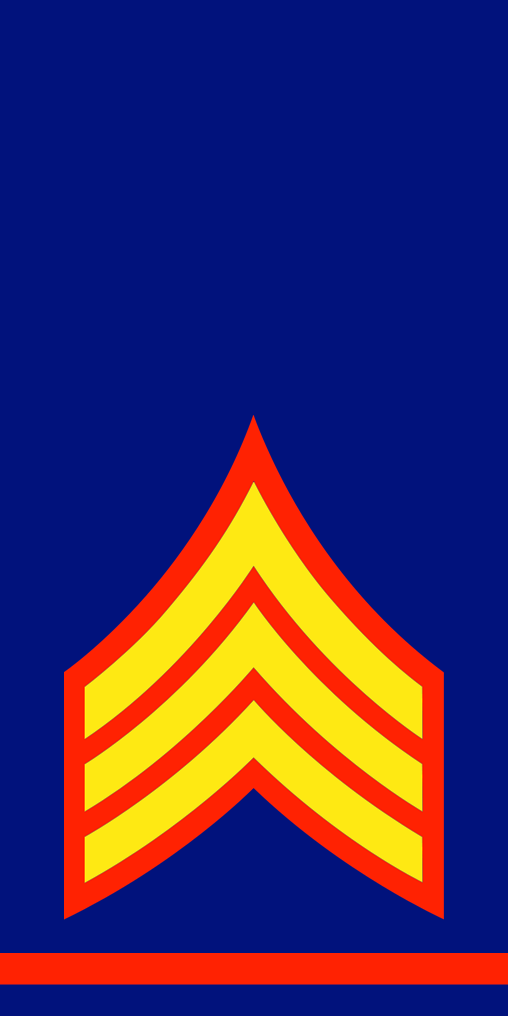
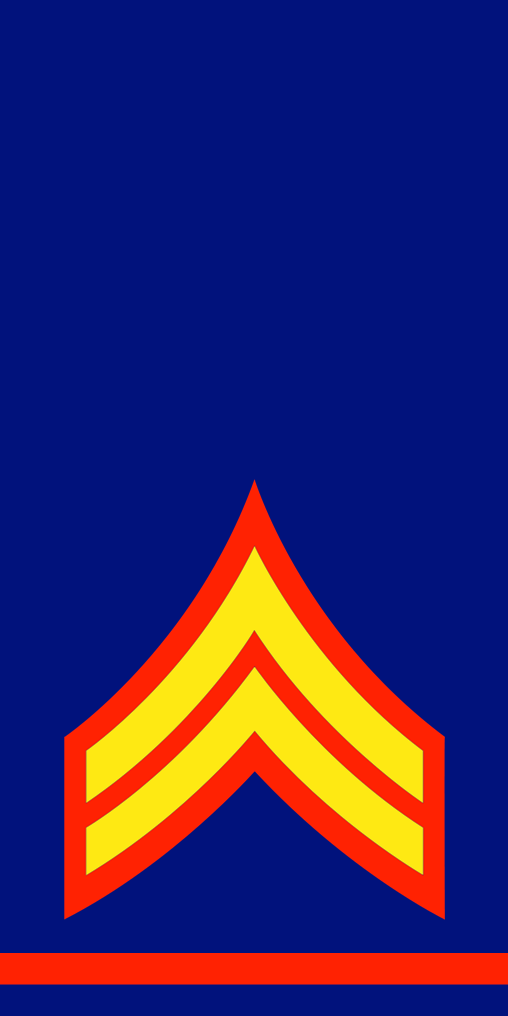
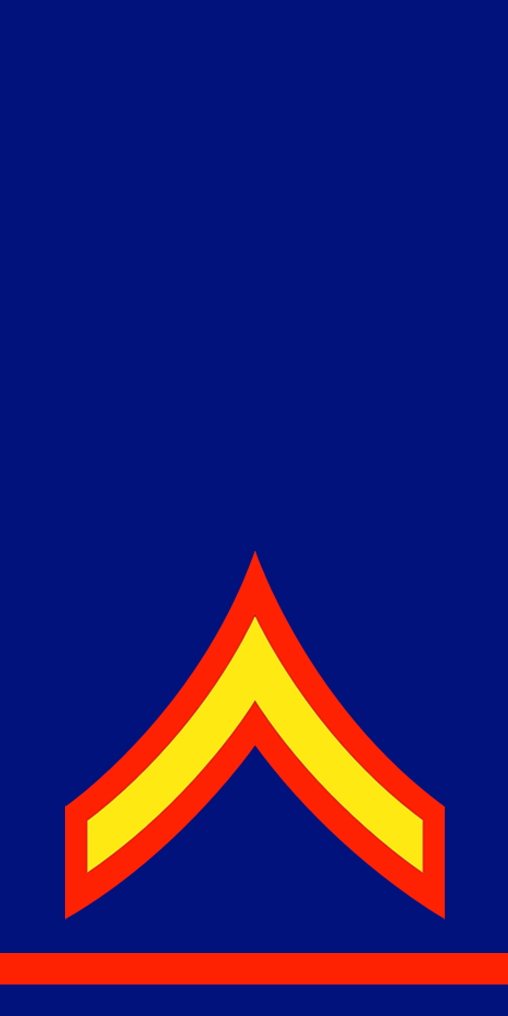
	Rank insignia
Officers
	Comandante; Primer Jefe	Comandante	Mayor	Capitán	Teniente	Subteniente
Troops
			Sargento 1.º	Sargento	Cabo 1.º	Cabo

== Philippines ==
=== Commissioned officers ===
- Fire director (major general)
- Fire chief superintendent (brigadier general)
- Fire senior superintendent (colonel)
- Fire superintendent (lieutenant colonel)
- Fire chief inspector (major)
- Fire senior inspector (captain)
- Fire inspector (lieutenant)

=== Non-commissioned officers ===
- Senior fire officer 4 (executive master sergeant)
- Senior fire officer 3 (chief master sergeant)
- Senior fire officer 2 (senior master sergeant)
- Senior fire officer 1 (master sergeant)
- Fire officer 3 (staff sergeant)
- Fire officer 2 (corporal)
- Fire officer 1 (firefighter)

== Peru ==
Cuerpo General de Bomberos Voluntarios del Perú

Category	General Officers			Superior Officers		Officers			Sub-Officers
	sinmarco	sinmarco	sinmarco	sinmarco	sinmarco	sinmarco	sinmarco	sinmarco	sinmarco
Rank	Comandante general	General de brigada	Brigadier mayor	Brigadier	Teniente brigadier	Capitán	Teniente	Subteniente	Seccionario

== Poland ==
=== State Fire Service ===
Generał brygadier General brigadier Major general	Nadbrygadier; Chief brigadier Brigadier general	Starszy brygadier Senior brigadier Colonel	Brygadier; Brigadier; Lieutenant colonel
Młodszy brygadier Junior brigadier Major	Starszy kapitan Senior captain Captain	Kapitan; Captain; First lieutenant	Młodszy kapitan Junior captain Second lieutenant
Aspirant sztabowy Staff aspirant Command sergeant major	Starszy aspirant Senior aspirant Sergeant major	Aspirant; Aspirant; Master sergeant	Młodszy aspirant Junior aspirant Sergeant 1st class
Starszy ogniomistrz Senior firemaster Staff sergeant	Ogniomistrz; Firemaster; Sergeant	Młodszy ogniomistrz Junior firemaster Corporal	
Starszy sekcyjny Senior section leader Specialist	Sekcyjny; Section leader Private 1st class	Starszy strażak Senior firefighter Private	Strażak; Firefighter; Private

=== Volunteer Fire Services ===
Local level

President	Chairman of the Audit Committee	Vice President and Fire Chief	Deputy Fire Chief	Member of the Audit Committee	Board Member

Platoon Commander	Deputy Platoon Commander	Section Commander	Deputy Section Commander	Team Commander	Senior Firefighter	Firefighter

=== Fire Brigades 1941 ===
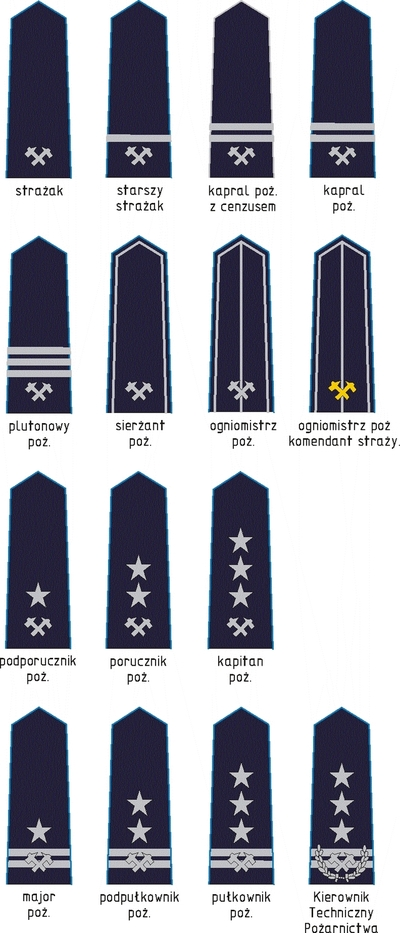
400p

== Romania ==
Commissioned officer ranks

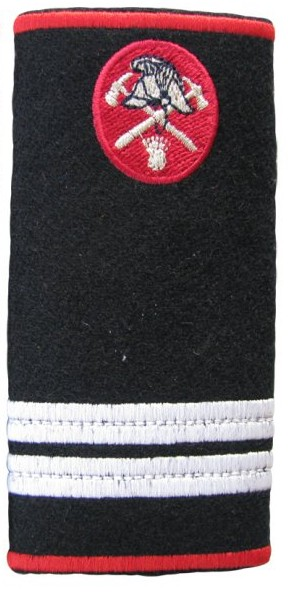
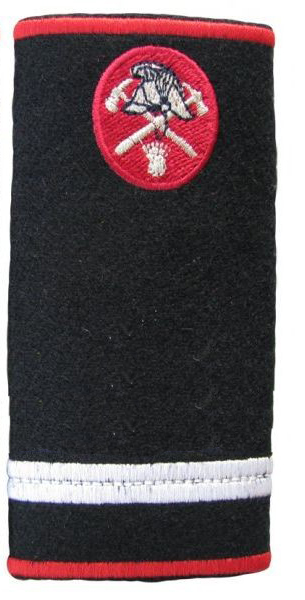
NATO code	OF-10	OF-9	OF-8	OF-7	OF-6	OF-5	OF-4	OF-3	OF-2	OF-1
(Romania) Romanian Military Firefighters Corps
(Romania) Romanian Military Firefighters Corps	Mareșal	General	General-locotenent	General-maior	General de brigadă	Colonel	Locotenent-colonel	Maior	Căpitan	Locotenent	Sublocotenent

Other ranks

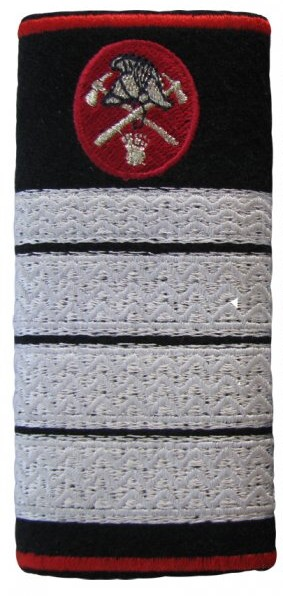
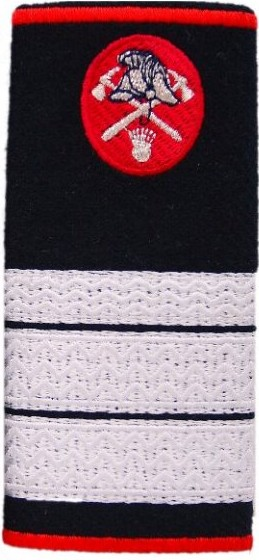
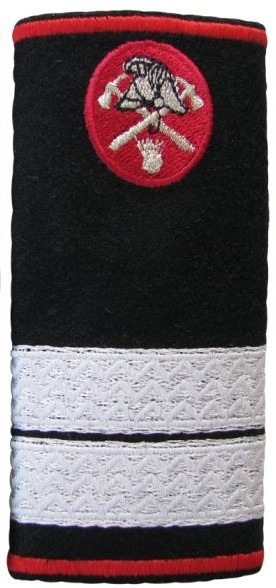
NATO code	OR-9		OR-8	OR-7	OR-6	OR-5	OR-4	OR-3	OR-2	OR-1
(Romania) Romanian Military Firefighters Corps
(Romania) Romanian Military Firefighters Corps	Plutonier adjutant șef	Plutonier adjutant	Plutonier-major	Plutonier	Sergent-major	Sergent

== Russian Federation ==
Rank insignia Personnel of the Russian State Fire Service use special ranks of internal service (apart from military personnel of the service who use military ranks).

	Senior command personnel			Senior command personnel			Middle command personnel				Officer students
Rank	Colonel General of Internal Service	Lieutenant General of Internal Service	Major General of Internal Service	Colonel of Internal Service	Lieutenant Colonel of Internal Service	Major of Internal Service	Captain of Internal Service	Senior Lieutenant of Internal Service	Lieutenant of Internal Service	Junior Lieutenant of Internal Service	Officer Student
Rank insignia											

	Junior command personnel						Privates
Rank	Senior Warrant Officer of Internal Service	Warrant Officer of Internal Service	Master Sergeant of Internal Service	Senior Sergeant of Internal Service	Sergeant of Internal Service	Junior Sergeant of Internal Service	Private of Internal Service
Rank insignia							

Helmet insignia

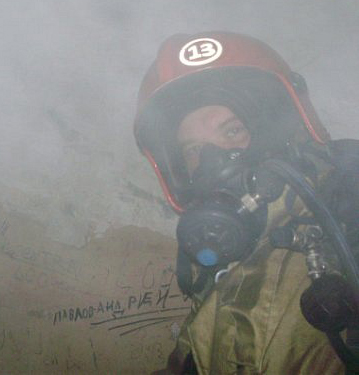
A Russian firefighter with a head of duty shift fire station helmet.

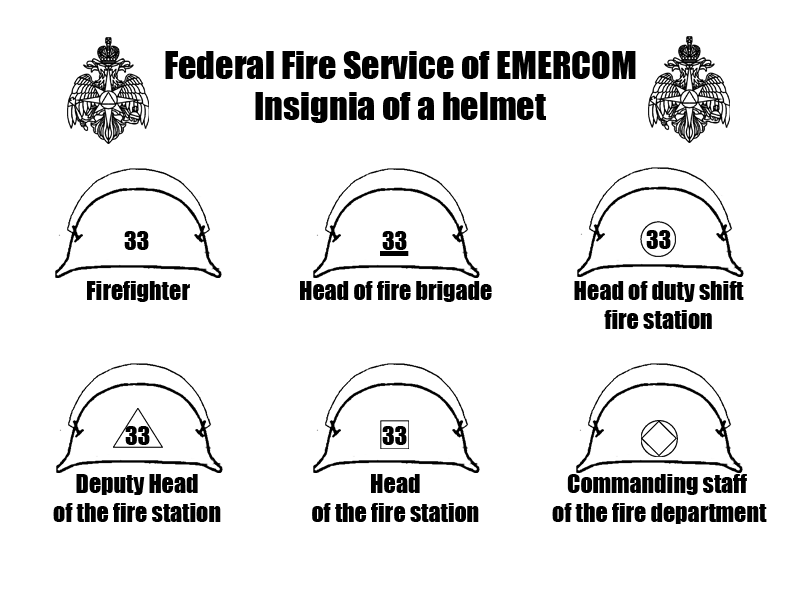

Rank	Helmet colour/markings
Firefighter	The all color helmet with the applied number, indicating the fire station
Head of fire brigade	The all color helmet with the applied number, indicating the fire station, underlined by line 50 mm wide and 5 mm thick
Head of duty shift fire station	The all color helmet with the applied a circle, inside which the applied number is indicating the fire station
Deputy head of the fire station	The all color helmet with the applied a triangle, inside which the applied number is indicating the fire station
Head of the fire station	The all color helmet with the applied a square, inside which the applied number is indicating the fire station
Commanding staff of the fire department	The all color helmet with the applied a circle, inside which the applied a rhombus

== Singapore ==
Officers

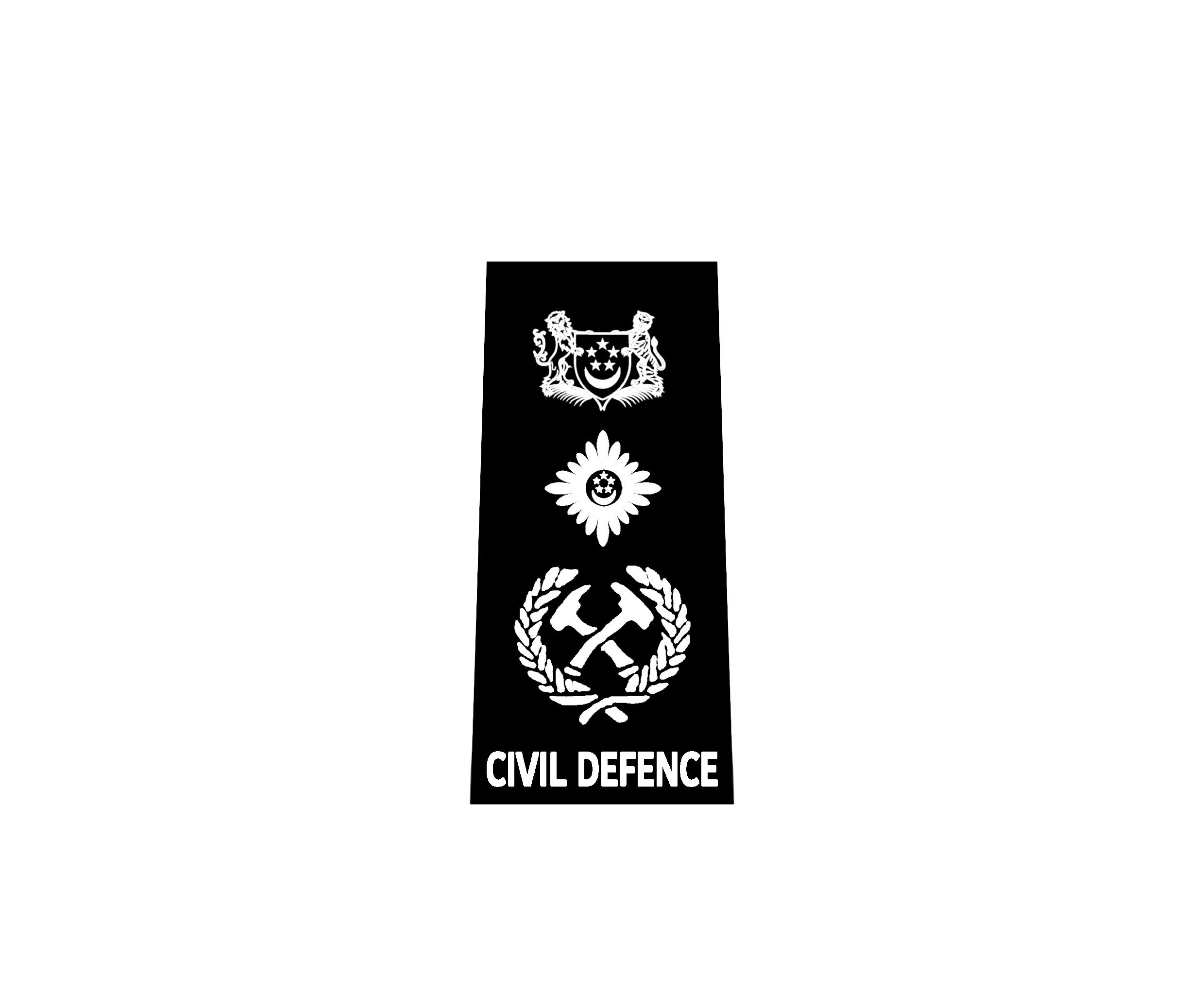
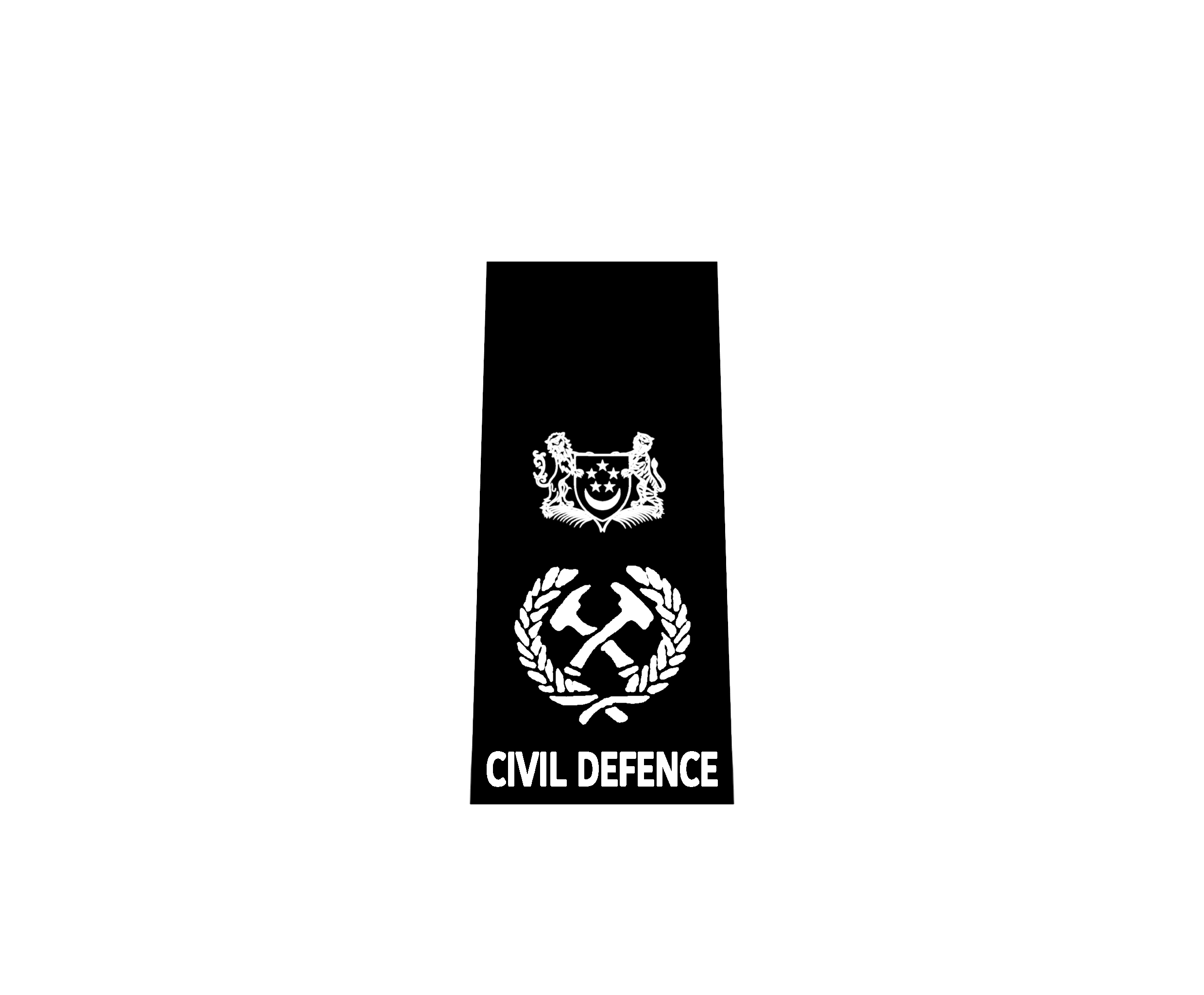
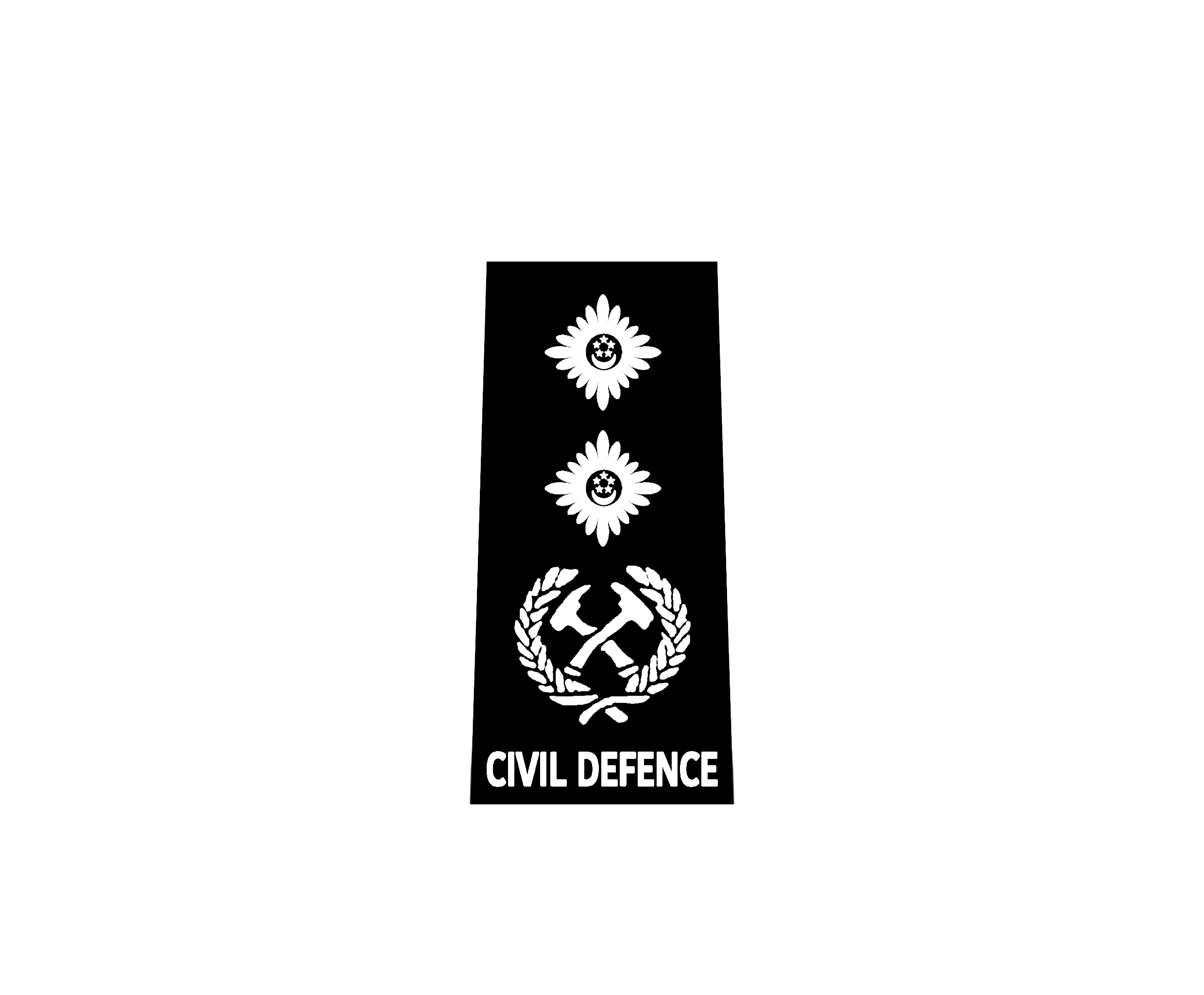
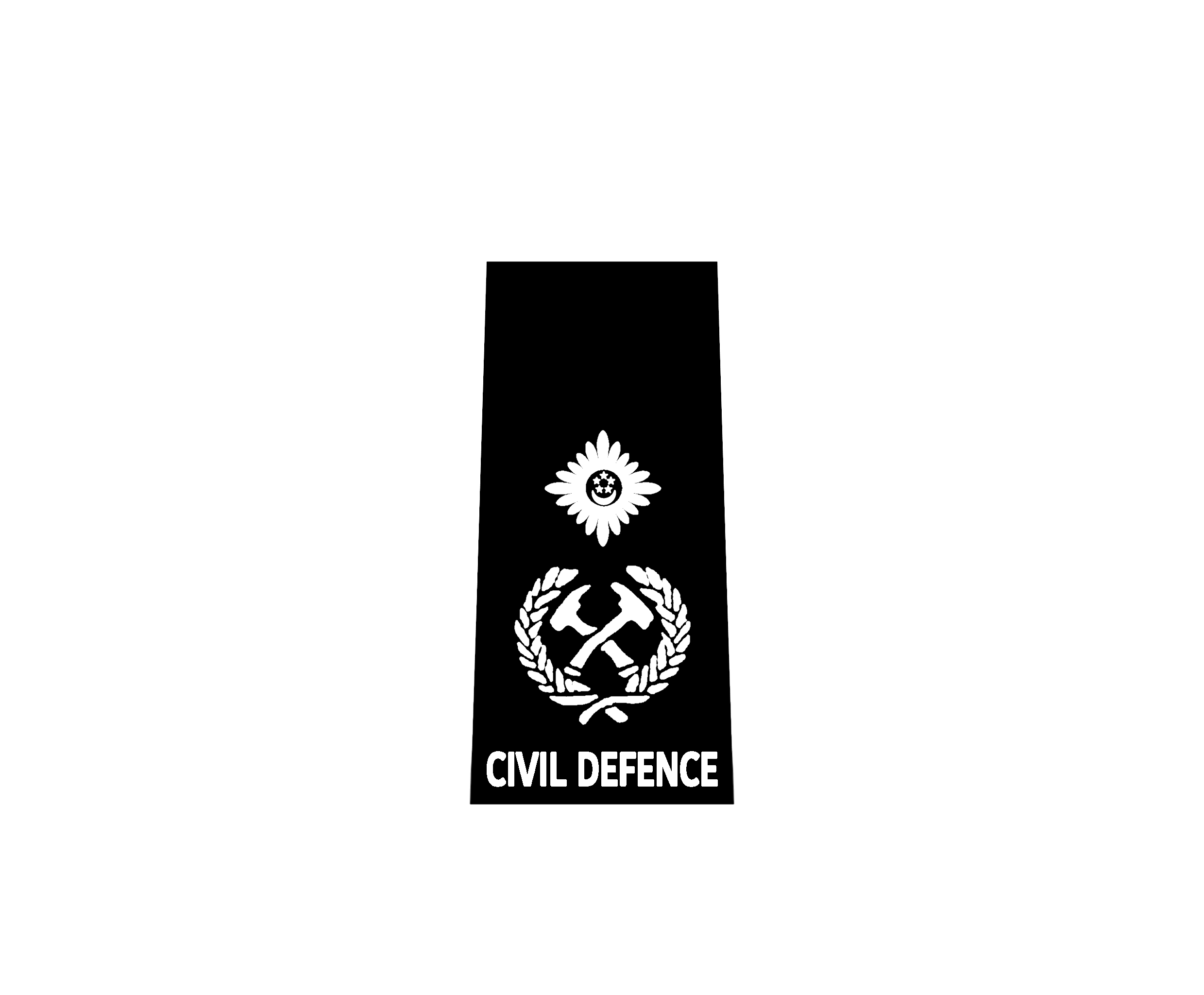
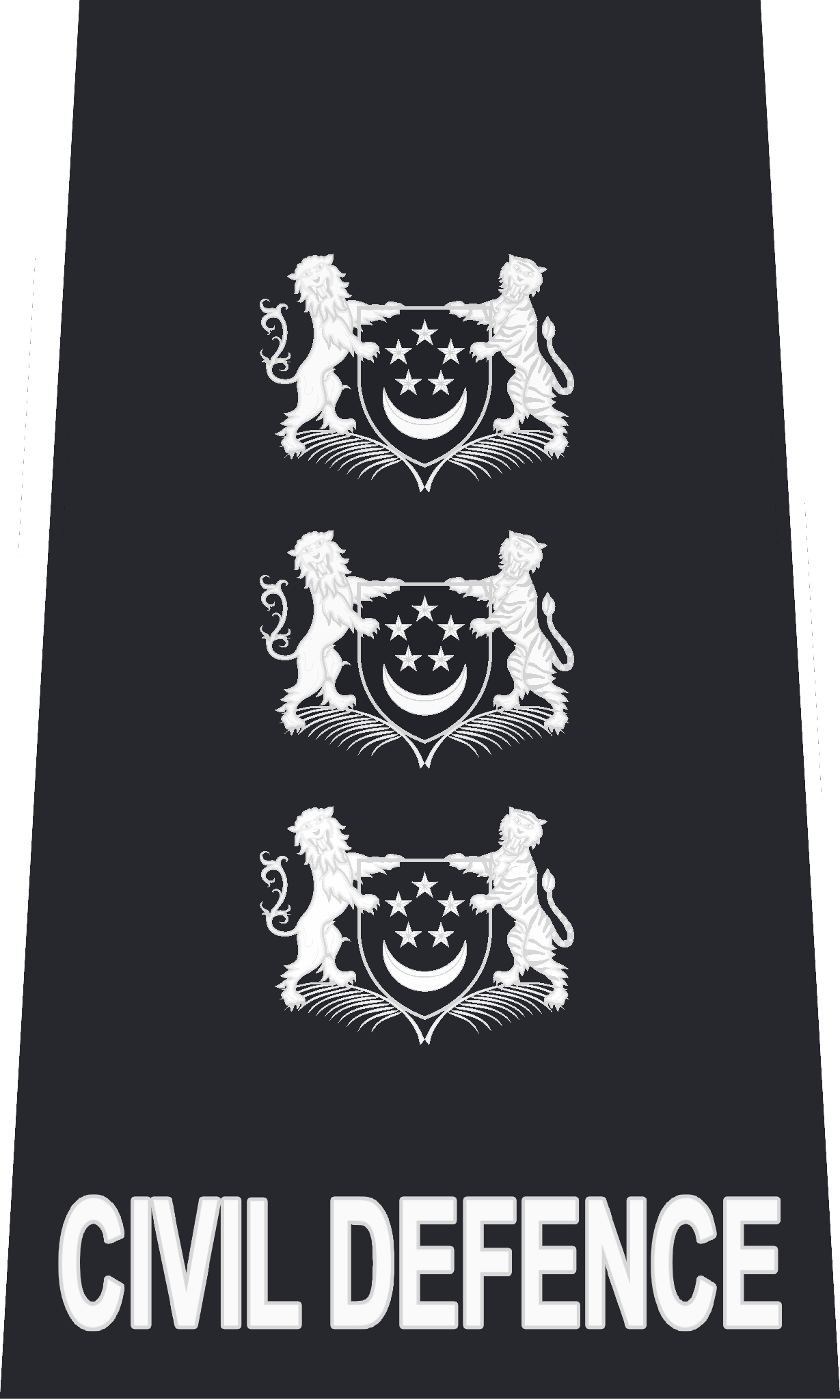
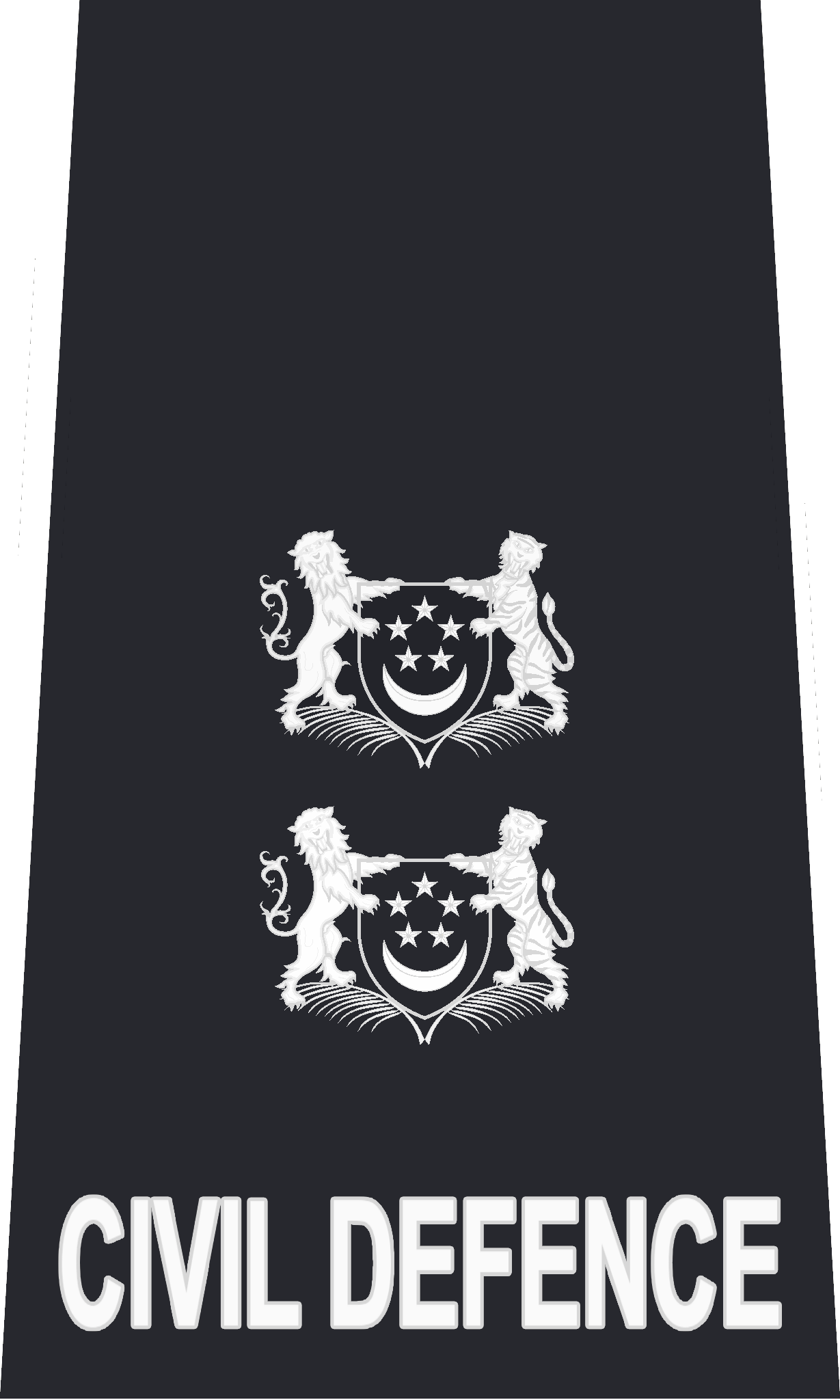
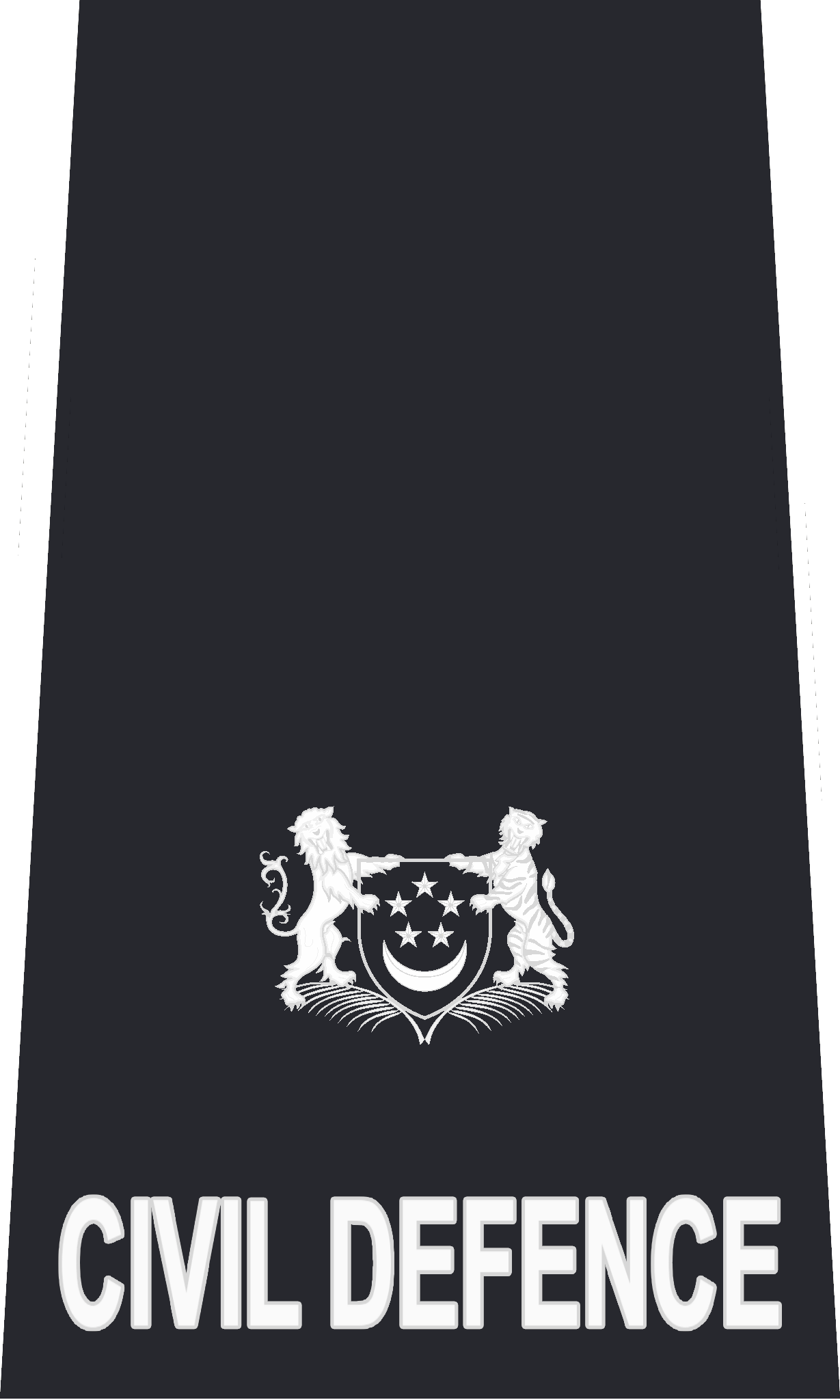
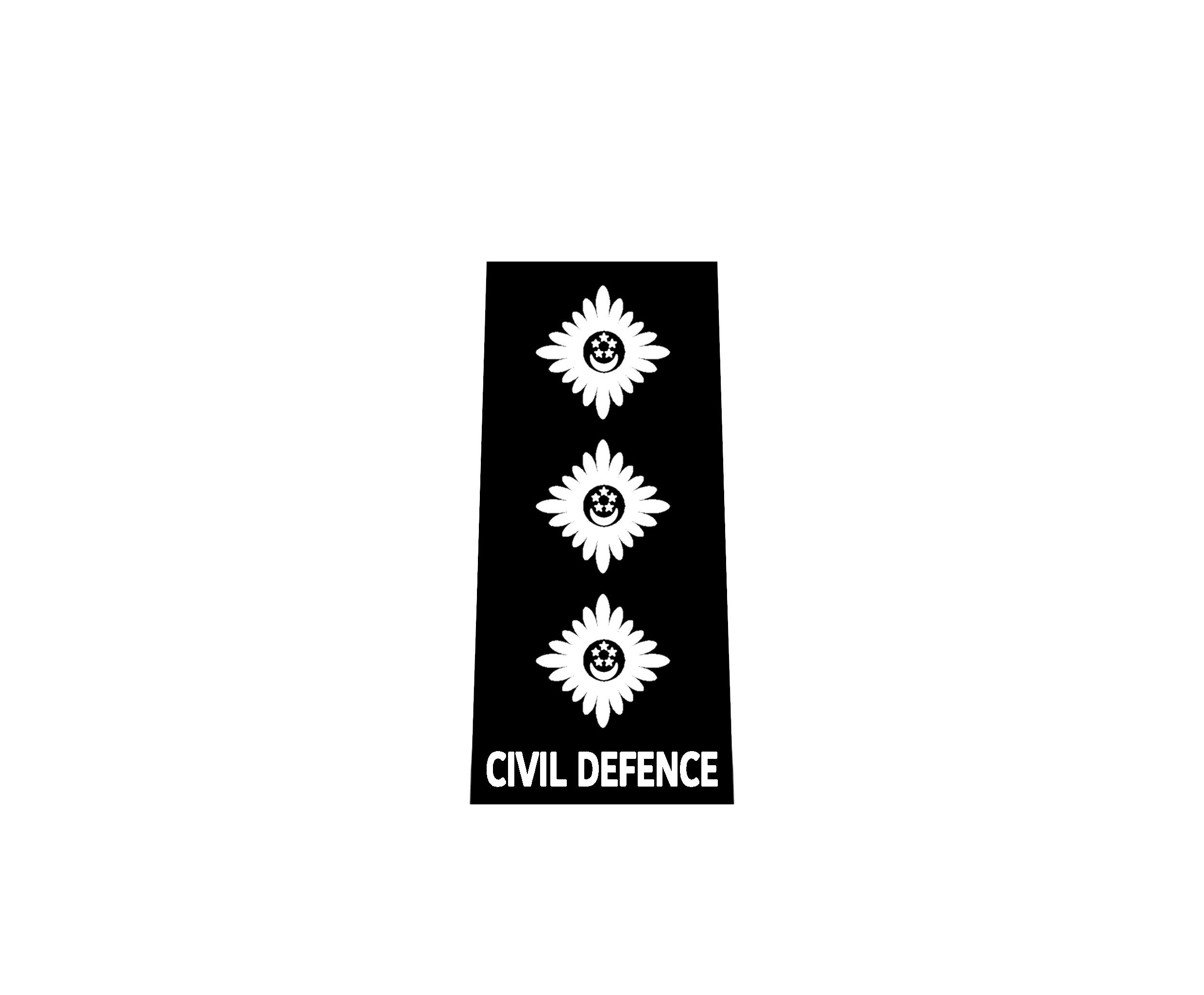
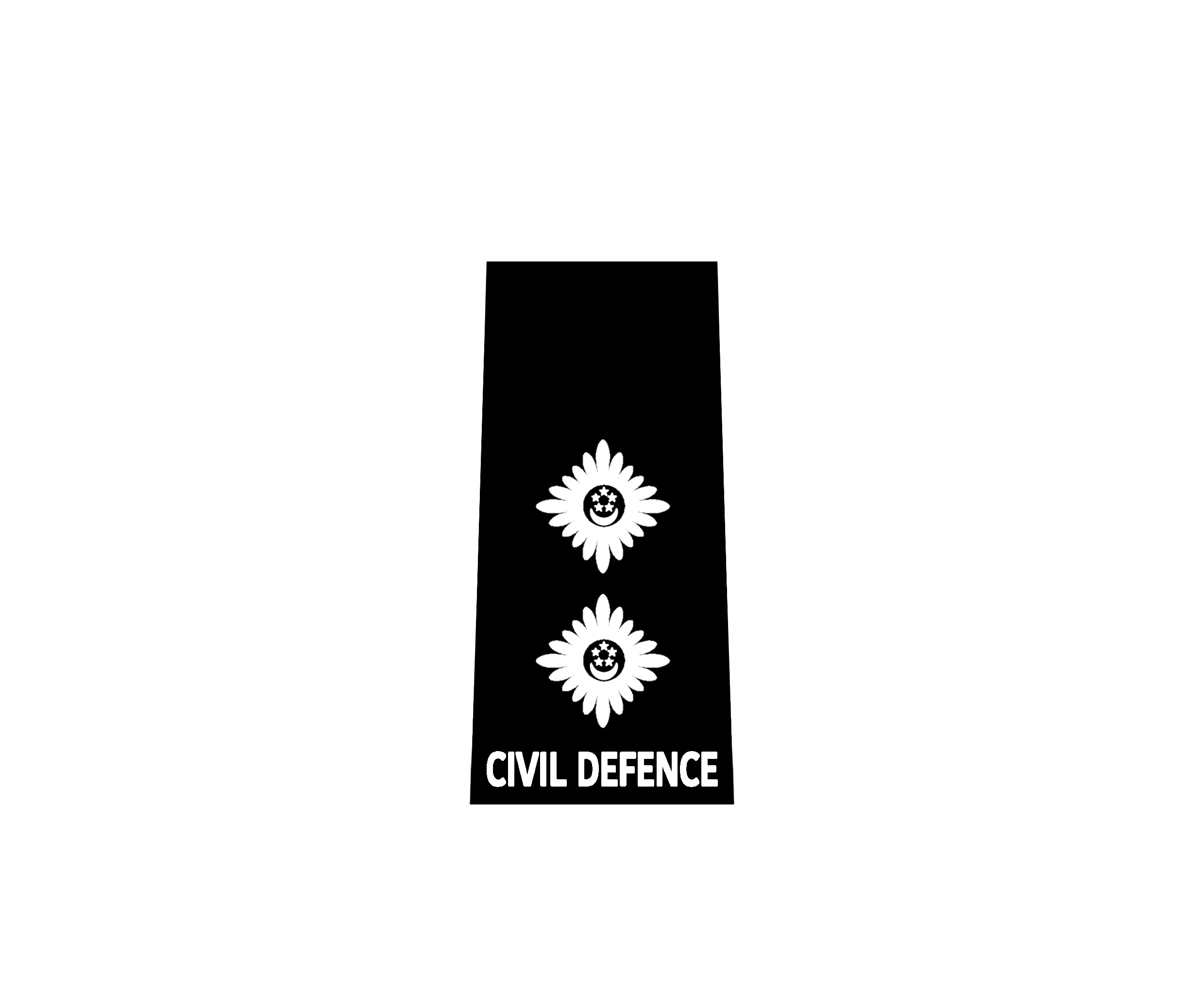
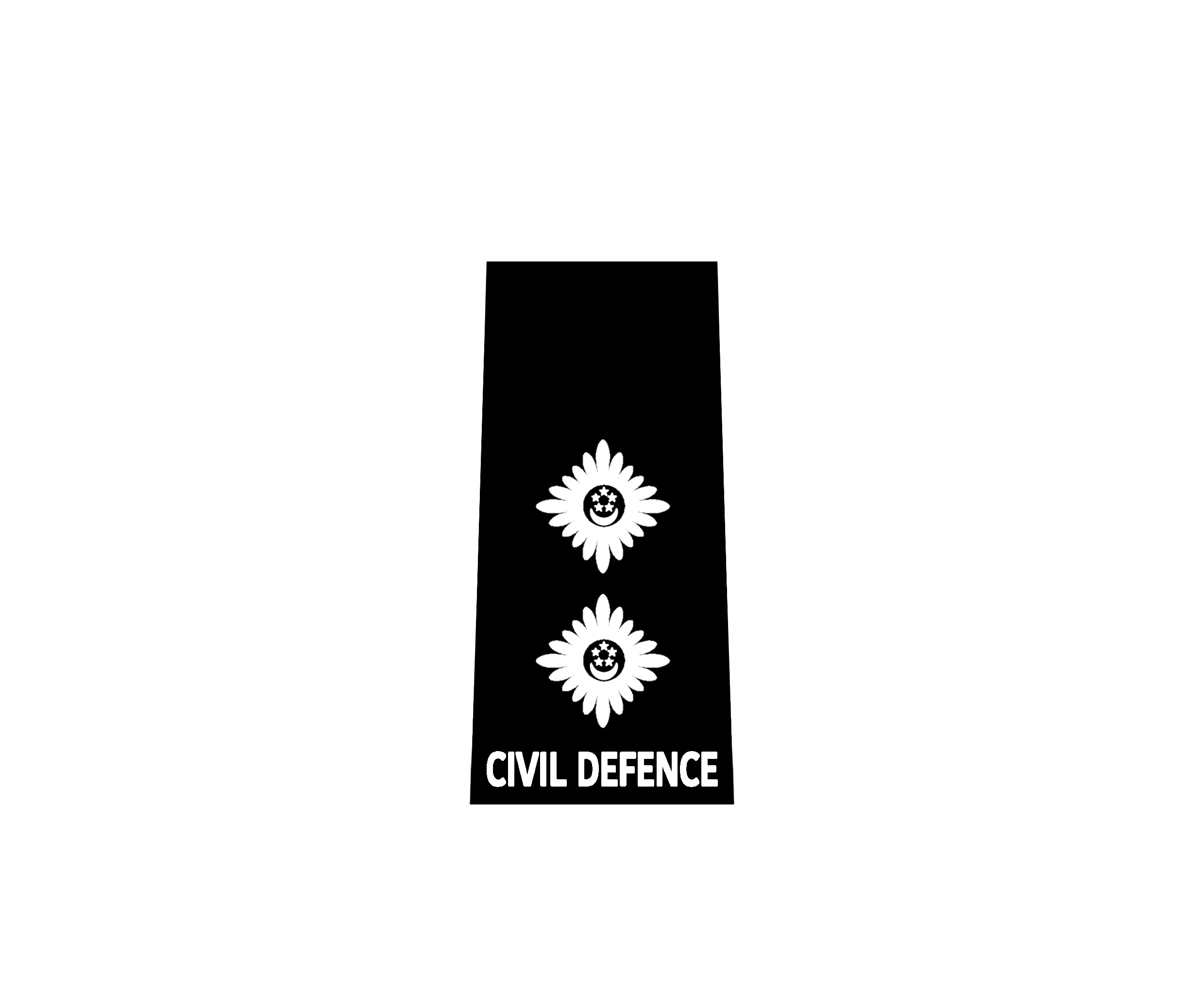
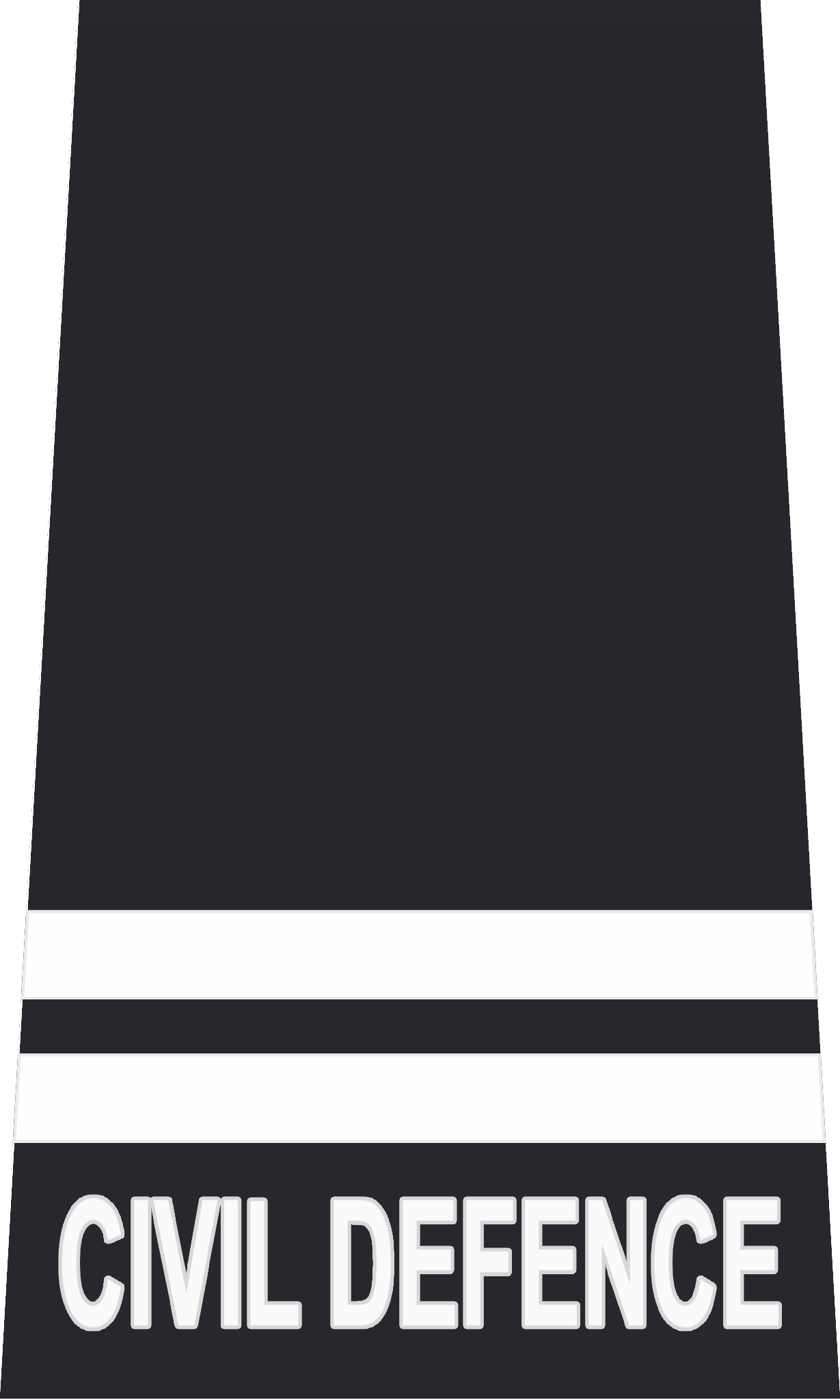
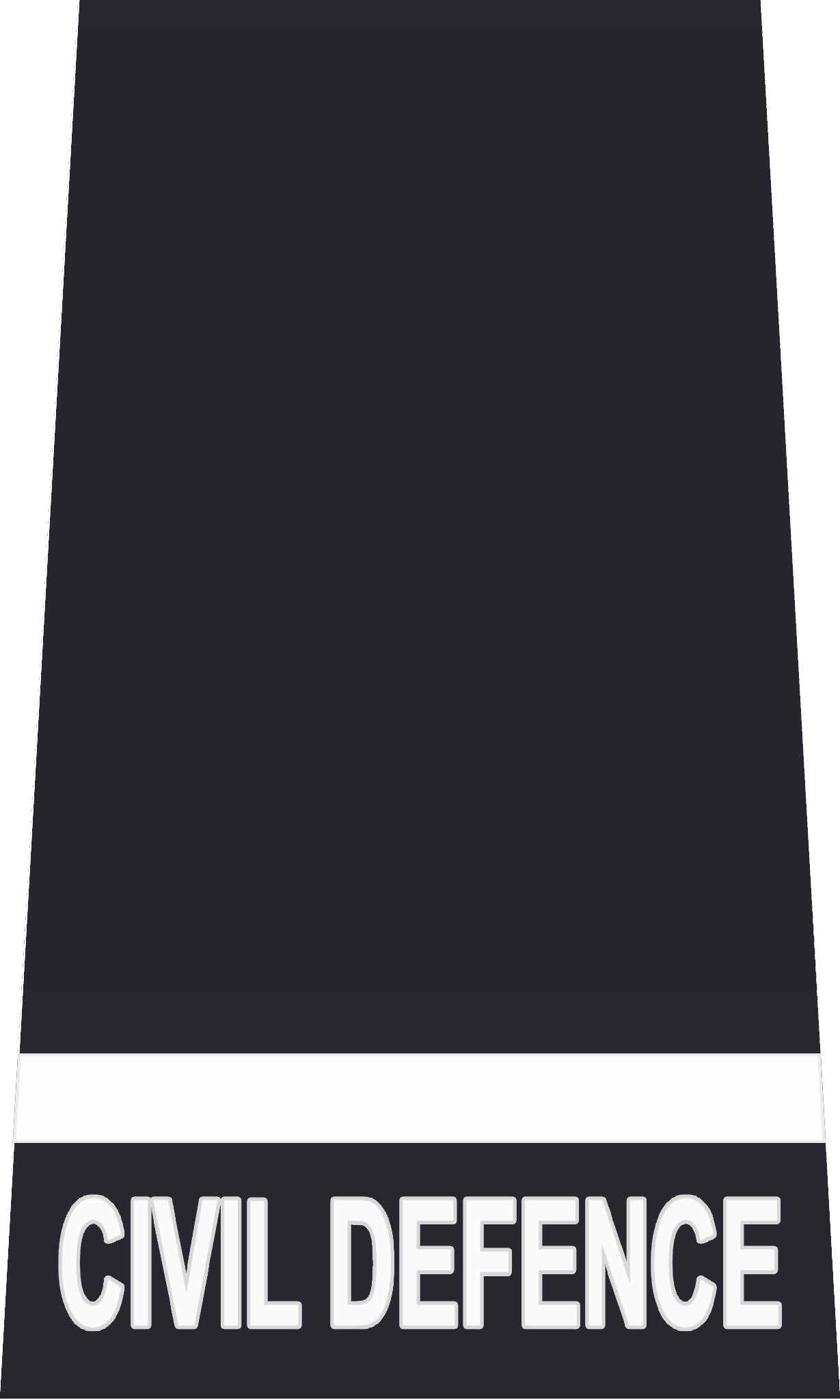
Rank group	General / flag officers				Senior officers			Junior officers
Singapore Civil Defence Force
Singapore Civil Defence Force	Commissioner	Deputy commissioner	Senior assistant commissioner	Assistant commissioner	Colonel	Lieutenant colonel	Major	Captain	Lieutenant	Second lieutenant	Officer cadet

Warrant officers

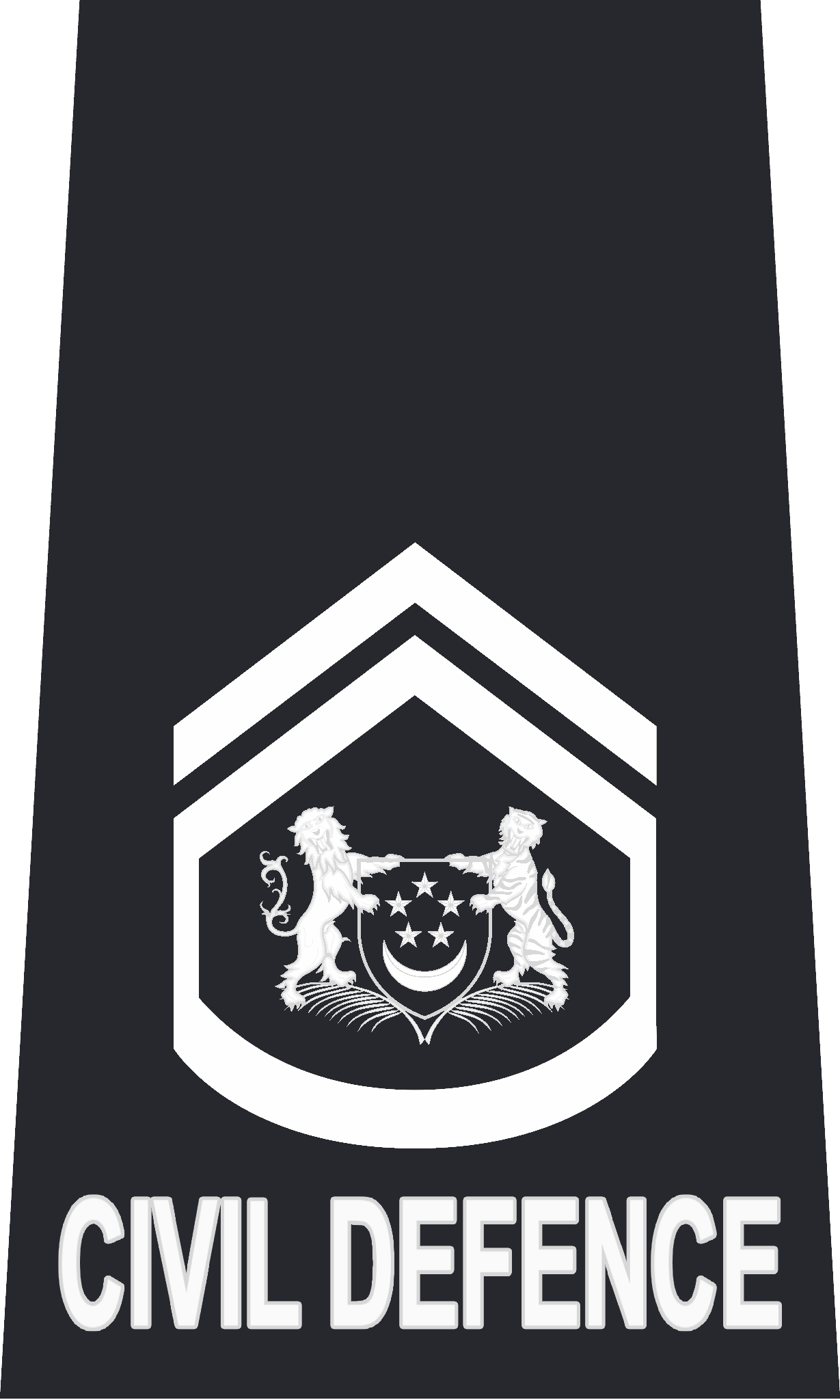
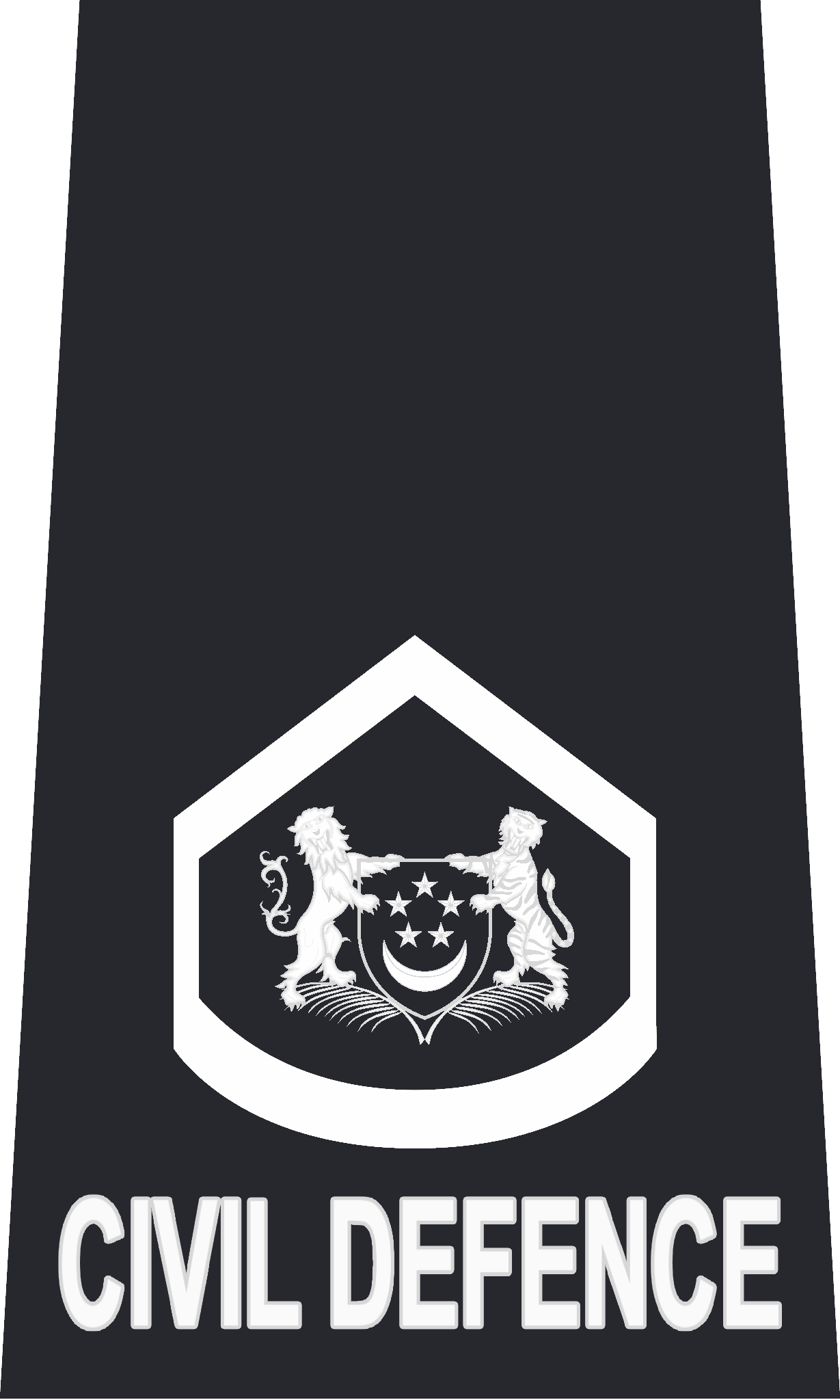
Rank group	Warrant officers
Singapore Civil Defence Force
Singapore Civil Defence Force	Warrant officer 2	Warrant officer 1

Other ranks

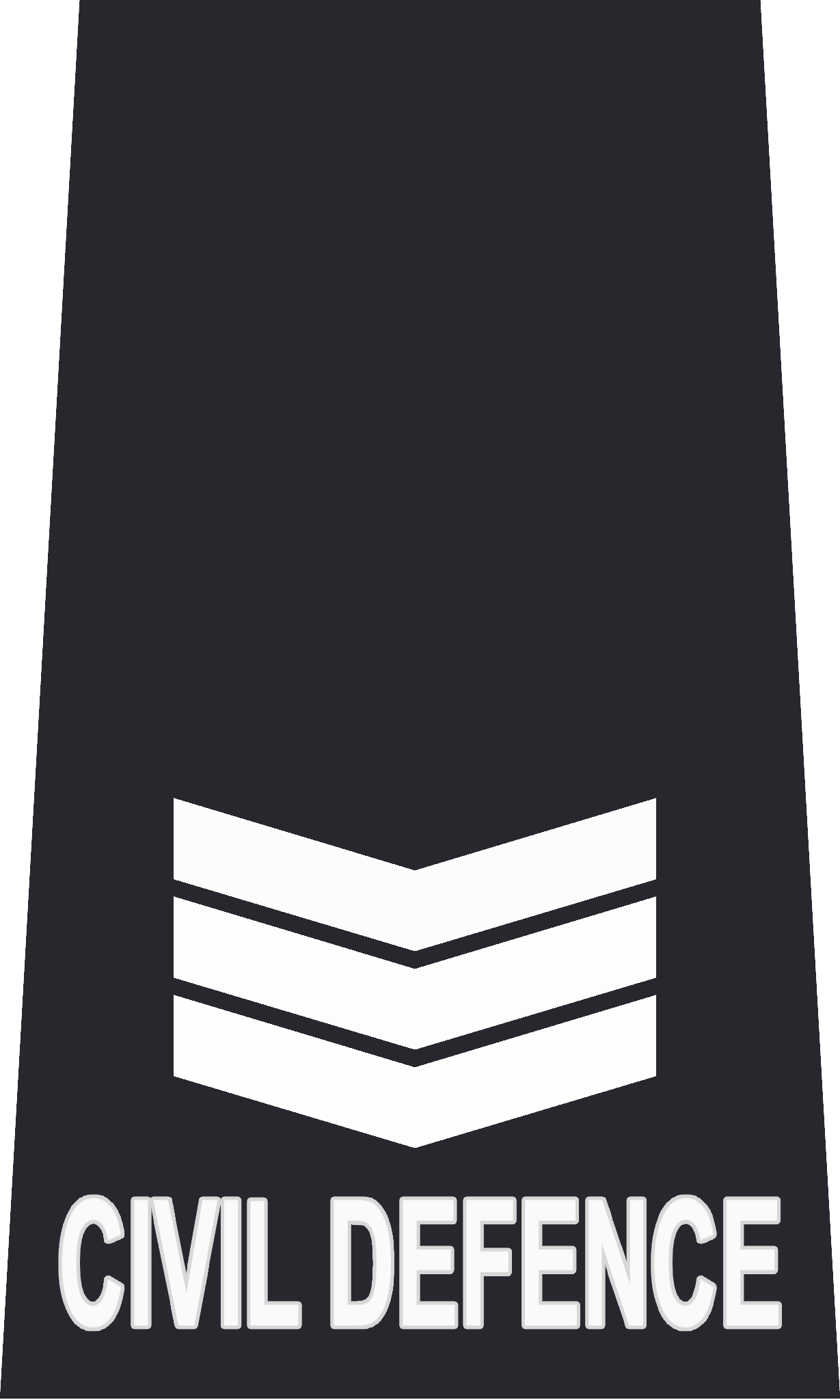
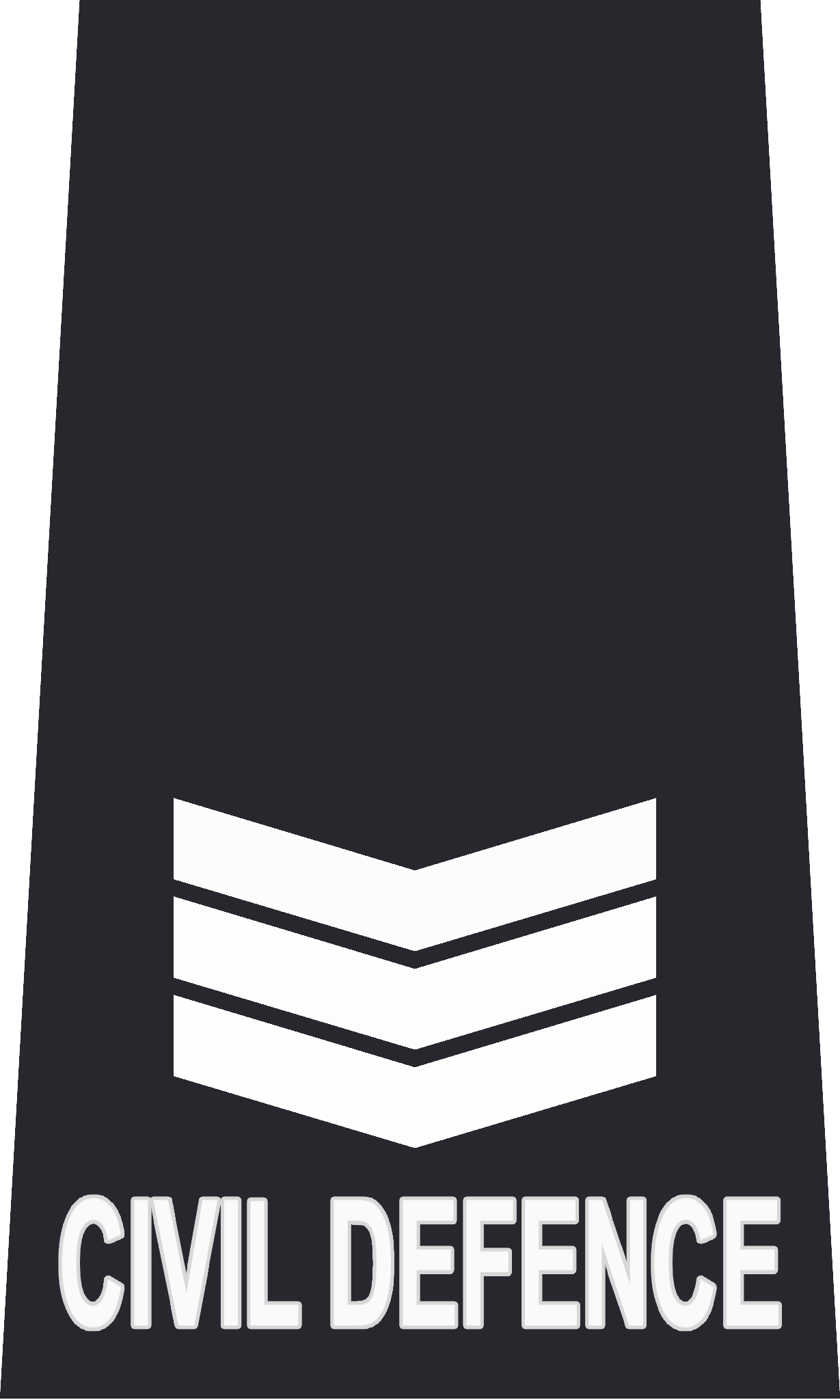
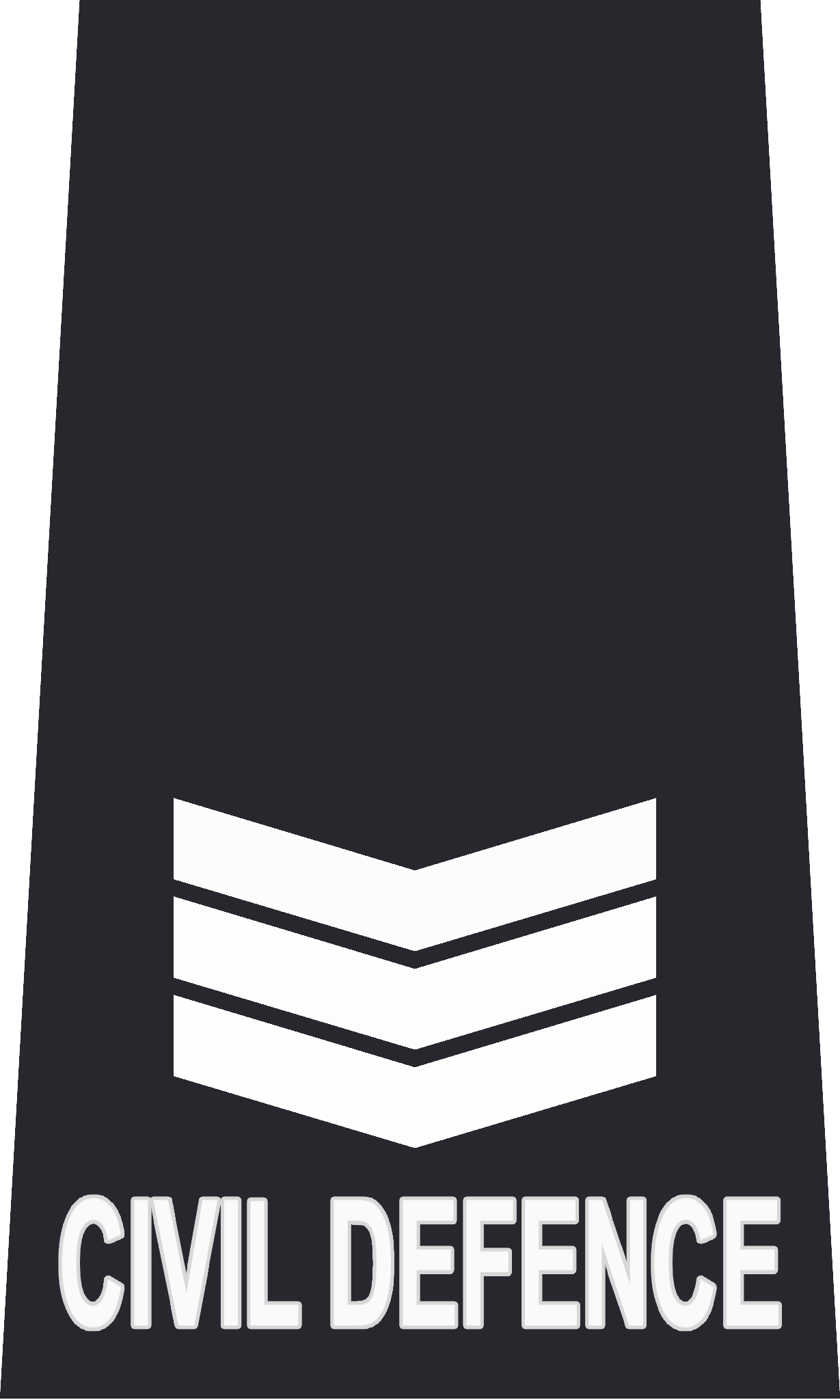
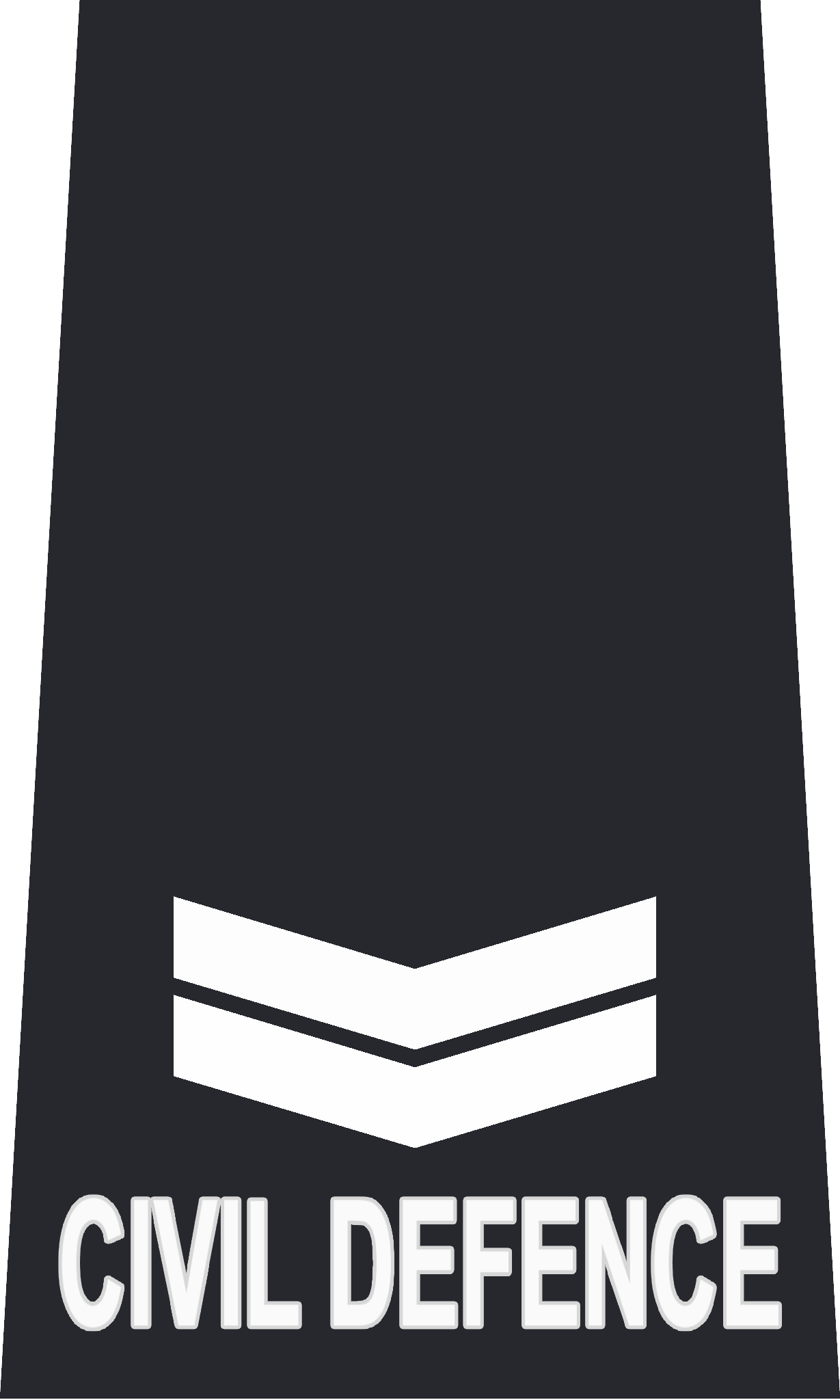
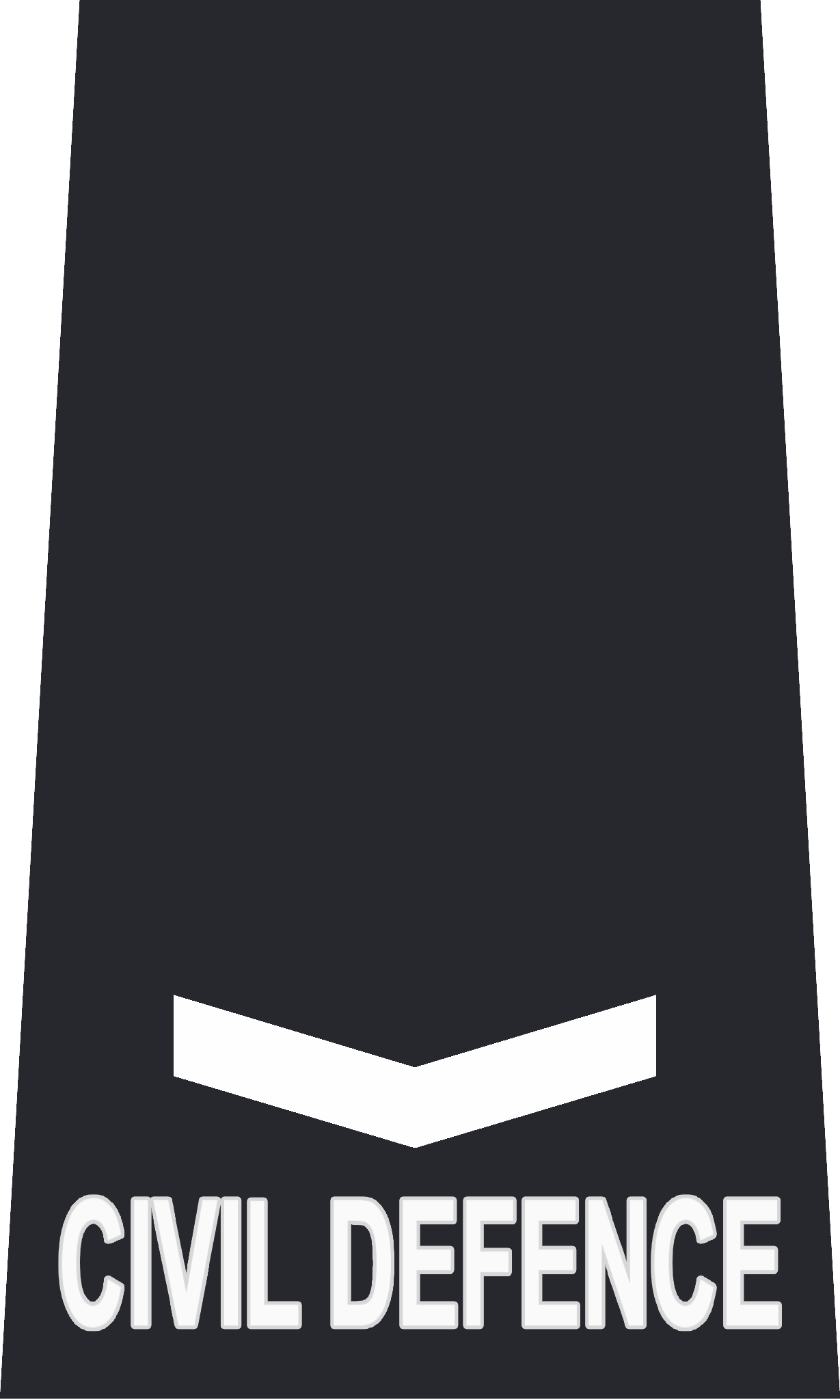
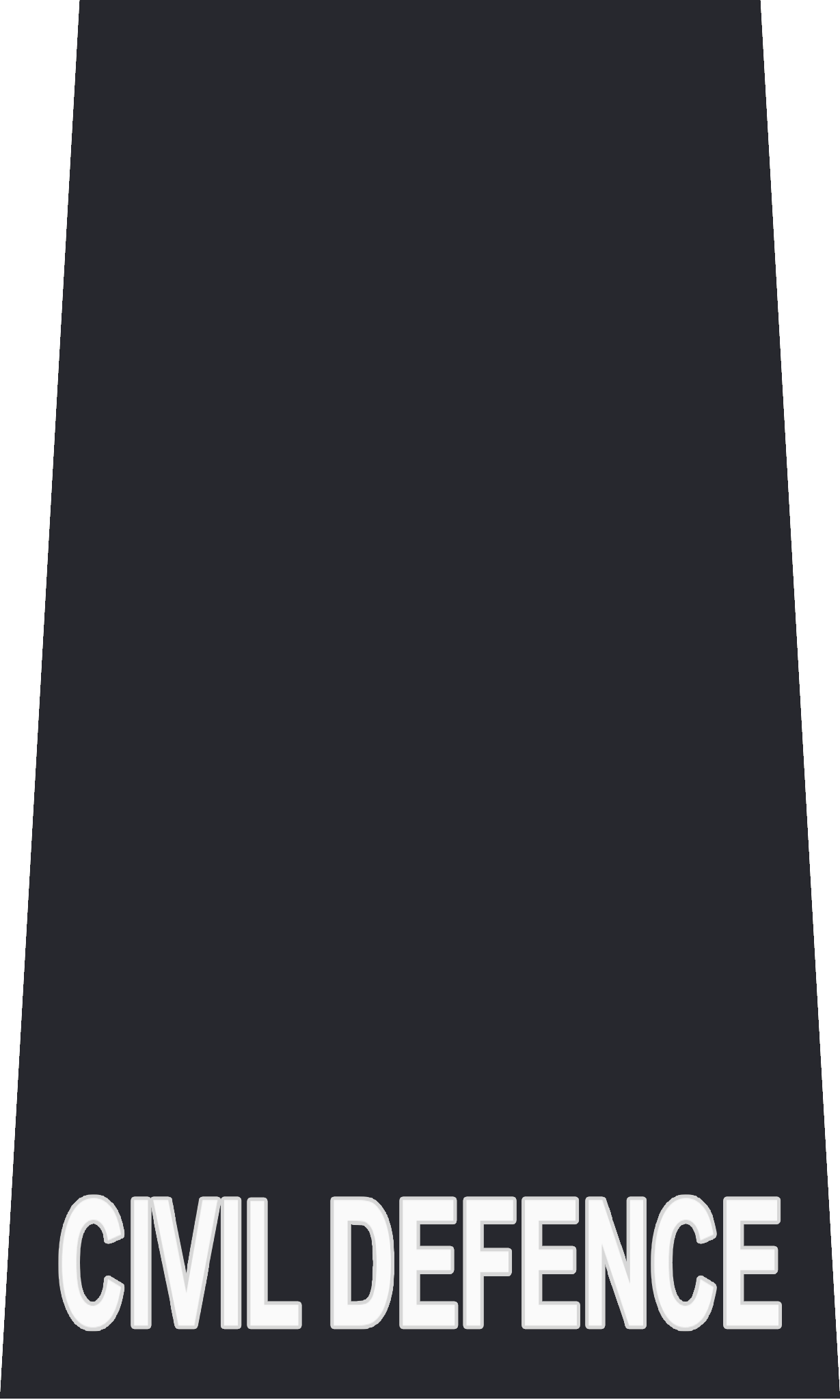
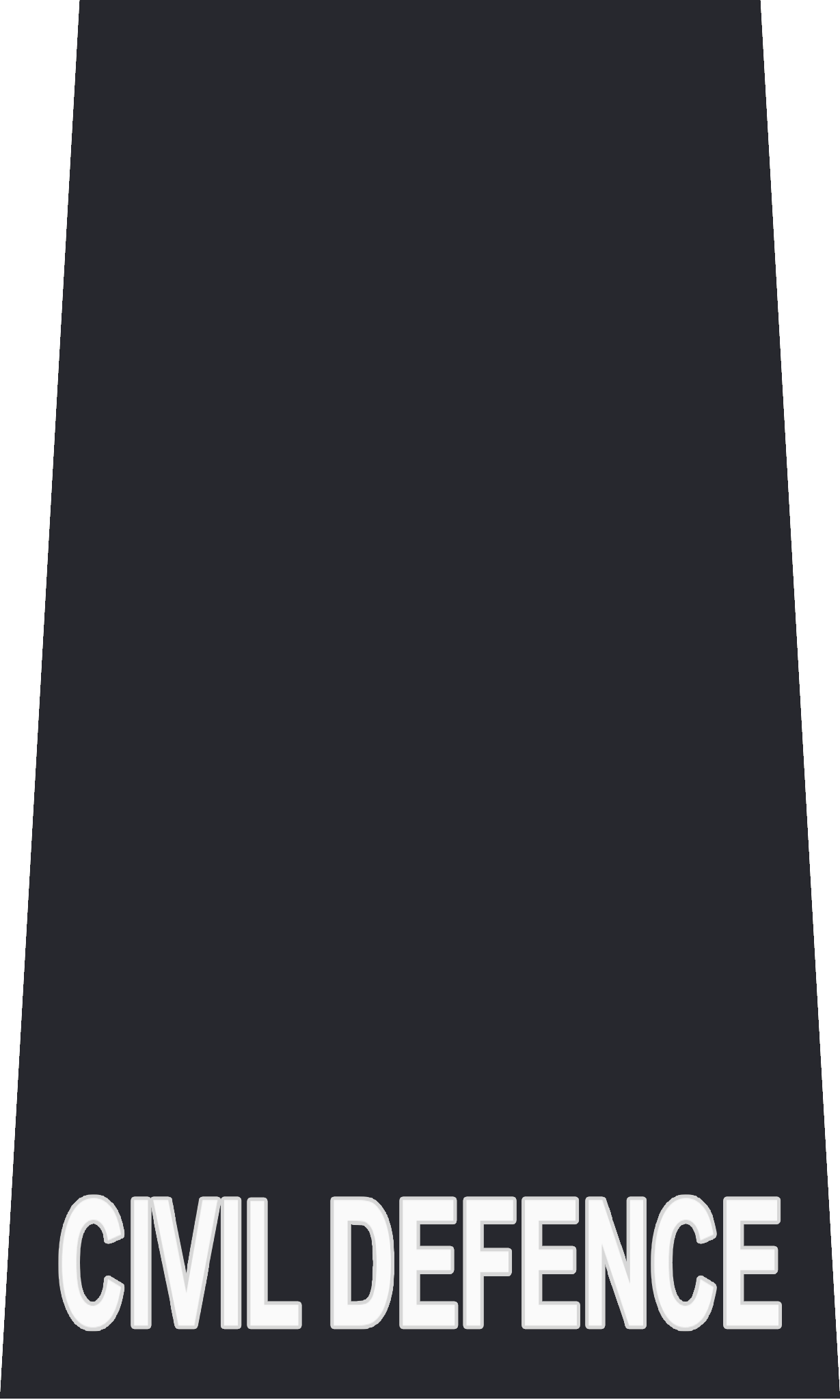
Rank group	Senior NCOs			Junior NCOs		Enlisted
Singapore Civil Defence Force
Singapore Civil Defence Force	Sergeant 3	Sergeant 2	Sergeant 1	Corporal	Lance corporal	Private	Recruit

== Soviet Union ==
1936								1937–1939			
Category		City Fire Department BBV		Paramilitary Fire Service PMB				Category	City Fire Department	Paramilitary Fire Service	
Category		1936		From 16.06.1936		From 13.09.1936		Category	From 17.11.1937	From 15.04.1938	From 26.02.1939
BBV	PMB	Collar	Forearms	Collar patches	Forearms	Collar patches	Upper arm	Category	Collar patch	Collar patch	Collar patch
Private		n/a						Private			no changes
К-1	К-1	n/a						К-1, К-2			no changes
К-2	К-2	n/a						К-1, К-2			no changes
К-3	n/a	n/a									
К-4	К-3	знак по 1936						К-3			no changes
К-5	К-4	знак по 1936						К-4			no changes
К-6	К-5	знак по 1936						К-5			no changes
К-7	К-6	знак по 1936						К-6			no changes
К-8	К-7	знак по 1936						К-7			no changes
К-9	К-8	знак по 1936						К-8			no changes
К-10	К-9	знак по 1936						К-9			no changes
К-11	К-10	знак по 1936						К-10			
К-12	К-11	знак по 1936						К-11			
К-13	К-12	знак по 1936						К-12			
n/a	К-13	n/a	n/a					К-13	n/a	n/a	

== Switzerland ==
Officer grades

Rank epaulettes							
Rank name	German	Oberst	Oberstleutnant	Major	Hauptmann	Oberleutnant	Leutnant
Rank name	French	Colonel	Lieutenant colonel	Major	Capitaine	Premier lieutenant	Lieutenant
Rank name	Italian	Colonnello	Tenente colonnello	Maggiore	Capitano	Primo tenente	Tenente
Rank name	Romansh	Colonel	Litinent colonel	Maior	Chapitani	Primlitenant	Litenet

Other grades

Rank epaulettes									
Rank name	German	Adjutant Unteroffizier	Feldweibel	Fourier	Wachtmeister	Korporal	Gefreiter	Soldat	Rekrut / Aspirant
Rank name	French	Adjudant sous-officier	Sergent-major	Fourrier	Sergent	Caporal	Appointé	Soldat	Recrue / Aspirant
Rank name	Italian	Aiutante sottufficiale	Sergente maggiore	Furiere	Sergente	Caporale	Appuntato	Soldato	Recluta / Aspirante
Rank name	Romansh	Adjutant sutuffizier	Primsergent	Furier	Sergent	Caporal	Appuntà	Schuldà	Recruit

== Taiwan ==
Level	1	2	3	4	5	6	7	8	9	10	11
	Director general	Deputy director general * Fire chief of metropolitan city	Level 3 positions	Level 4 positions	Level 5 positions	Level 6 positions	Level 7 positions	Level 8 positions	Team leader	Team member	Basic level

== Tunisia ==
Tunisian firefighter's ranks are the same as the army, police and national guard.

== Turkey ==
Head of Department	Divisional Managers		Station Managers		Crew Managers
					orta
Daire Başkanı; Chief Fire Officer	Müdür; Assistant Chief; Fire Officer	Şube Müdürü; Divisional Officer	Birim Amiri; Station Officer	Amir; Sub-Officer	Çavuş; Leading; Firefighter

== United Kingdom, Crown dependencies, British Overseas Territories ==
=== Contemporary ===
Other fire service title	Chief fire officer	Deputy chief fire officer	Assistant chief fire officer		Area manager	Group manager	Station manager	Watch manager	Crew manager		Firefighter
London title	Commissioner	Deputy commissioner	Assistant commissioner		Deputy assistant commissioner	Group commander (borough commander)	Station commander	Station officer	Sub-officer	Leading firefighter	Firefighter
Scottish title	Chief Officer	Deputy Chief Officer	Assistant Chief Officer	Deputy Assistant Chief Officer	Area Commander	Group Commander	Station Commander	Watch Commander	Crew Commander		Firefighter
Isle of Man title	Chief fire officer	Deputy chief fire officer				Divisional officer	Assistant divisional officer	Station officer	Sub officer	Leading firefighter	Firefighter
Gibraltar title	Chief fire officer	Deputy chief fire officer				Divisional officer		Station officer	Sub officer	Leading firefighter	Firefighter
Insignia											

=== National Fire Service (1941–1948) ===
Rank	Chief Regional Fire Officer	Fire Force Commander	Assistant Fire Force Commander; Regional Woman Fire Officer	Divisional Officer; Area Officer	Column Officer; Assistant Area Officer	Senior Company Officer; Group Officer	Company Officer; Assistant Group Officer	Section Leader; Senior Leading Firewoman	Leading Fireman; Leading Firewoman	Fireman; Firewoman
Insignia										

== United States ==
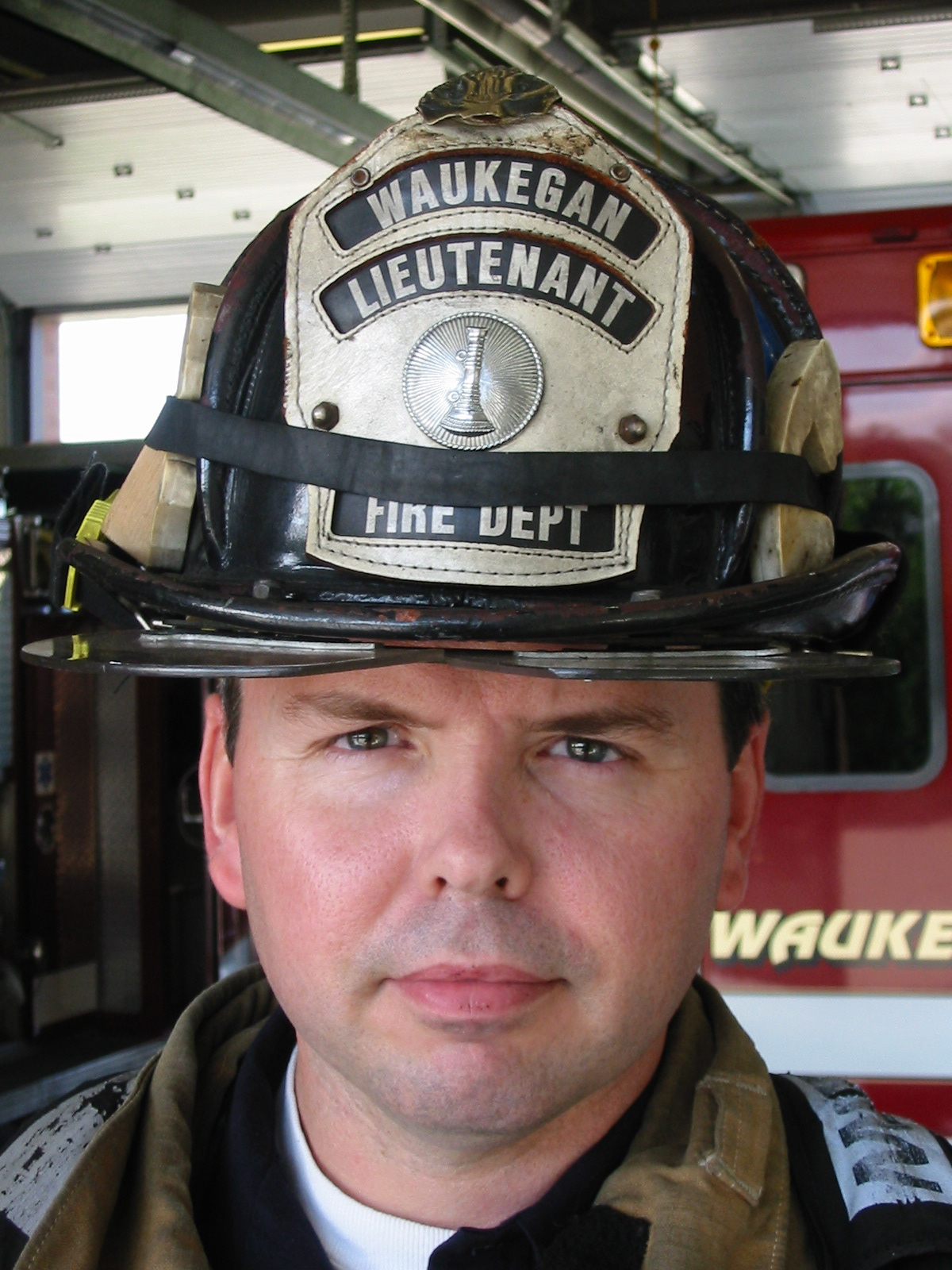
An American firefighter with a lieutenant's helmet

This ranking system is close to universal across all regions. There may be jurisdictions that do not utilize this rank structure, though they are rare.

In the United States, helmet colors often denote a fire fighter's rank or position. Generally, white helmets denote chief officers, (battalion chiefs, division chiefs, etc.), and red helmets denote company officers, (captains, lieutenants). While not universal, there are other commonalities, such as black for non-ranked firefighters, blue for EMS, and green for probationary firefighter.

There are some region specifics for helmet colors, though they have little to do with rank. For example, in San Francisco the SFFD paint their helmets based on a color system that denotes the apparatus they are assigned to.

Officer ranks are most commonly denoted by the number of speaking trumpets – a reference to a megaphone-like device used in the early days of the fire service, although currently and incorrectly called "bugles" – or by striping. Ranks proceed from one (lieutenant) to five (fire chief) trumpets.

The ranks of Deputy and Assistant Chief may differ based on region: one area may have the Assistant Chief as higher rank than Deputy, while another jurisdiction would be the opposite - Deputy out-ranking Assistant.

Rank	Insignia
Firefighter	No rank insignia
Engineer/apparatus operator/driver operator	No rank insignia
Lieutenant	
Captain	or
Battalion Chief/District Chief	or side by side
Division Chief/Assistant Chief/Deputy Chief	
Deputy Chief or Assistant Chief	
Fire Chief	

Typically, the captain is the ranking officer of a fire station, (which may include anywhere from one apparatus up to several apparatus), and the lieutenant is typically in charge of a single apparatus.

There are also both state (e.g. CalFire in California) and federal (e.g. U.S. Forest Service) rank structures. These align with the typical ranking of the rest of the North American fire service.

Some other U.S. fire departments such as the New York City Fire Department (FDNY) use military rank insignia (specifically sleeve insignia, though it is not an official part of the FDNY uniform code) in addition to the traditional bugles.

== Vatican City ==
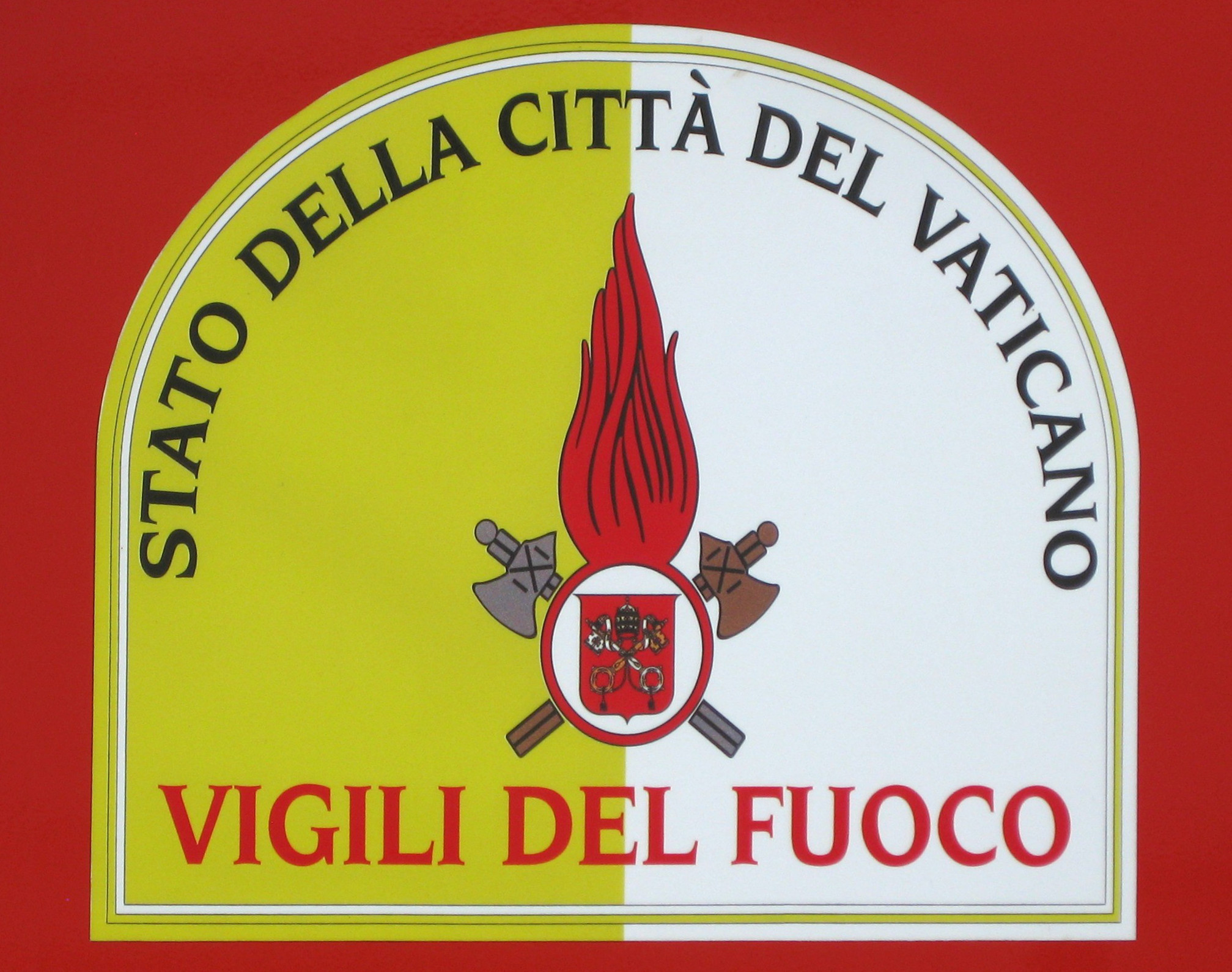
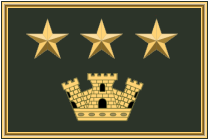
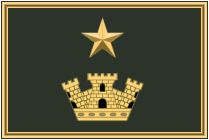
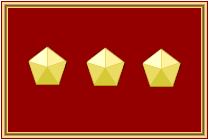
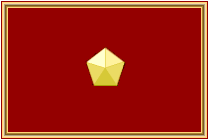
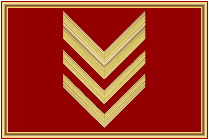
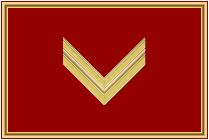
	Chief officers	Officers	SNCOs		NCOs	Firefighters	Students
Corps of Firefighters of the Vatican City State
Corps of Firefighters of the Vatican City State	Primo Dirigente coordinatore	Capo squadra esperto	Capo Squadra di prima classe	Capo Squadra di seconda classe	Vigile del fuoco prima classe	Vigile del fuoco seconda classe	Allievo vigile del fuoco

== Venezuela ==
The firefighter units of the National Directorate for Civil Protection and Firefighting follow a rank system modeled more on the National Guard and the French Paris Fire Brigade. However, officer ranks follow US influence in the insignia.

	General Officers		Superior Officers			Subaltern Officers		
Rank	Primer General de Bomberos	General de Bomberos	Coronel de Bomberos	Teniente Coronel de Bomberos	Mayor de Bomberos	Capitán de Bomberos	Premier Teniente de Bomberos	Teniente de Bomberos
Rank insignia								
English	Major general firefighter	Brigadier general firefighter	Colonel firefighter	Lieutenant colonel firefighter	Major firefighter (Battalion chief)	Captain firefighter	Lieutenant firefighter	Second lieutenant firefighter

	Sub-Officers			Corporals		Troops	
Rank	Sargento Mayor de Bomberos	Sargento Primero de Bomberos	Sargento Segundo de Bomberos	Cabo Primero de Bomberos	Cabo Segundo de Bomberos	Distinguido de Bomberos	Razo de Bomberos
Rank insignia							no insignia
English	Sergeant major firefighter	Staff sergeant firefighter	Sergeant firefighter	Corporal firefighter	Lance corporal firefighter	Senior firefighter	Firefighter

== See also ==
- List of police ranks
- Ranks and insignia of gendarmeries
- List of comparative military ranks
