= French Armed Forces =

Combined military forces of France

- Forces armées françaises
- Emblem of the French Defence Staff
- Founded: 26 May 1445 (581 years, 132 days)
- Service branches: French Army; French Navy; French Air and Space Force; National Gendarmerie
- Headquarters: Hexagone Balard, Paris

Leadership
- Chief of the Armed Forces: President Emmanuel Macron
- Minister of the Armed Forces: Catherine Vautrin
- Chief of the Defence Staff: Général d'armée aérienne Fabien Mandon

Personnel
- Military age: 17.5
- Conscription: None
- Active personnel: 264,000 (2026)
- Reserve personnel: 43,444 (2025)
- Deployed personnel: ~11,000

Expenditure
- Budget: €61.8 billion ($71.7 billion) (2025, including pensions) €50.5 billion ($58.5 billion) (2025, excluding pensions)
- Percent of GDP: ~2.1% (2026)

Industry
- Domestic suppliers: Airbus; ArianeGroup; Dassault Aviation; MBDA; Naval Group; KNDS France; Safran; Thales
- Foreign suppliers: United States; United Kingdom; Brazil; Switzerland; Germany; Netherlands; Italy; Norway; Canada; Belgium; Austria; NATO; European Union
- Annual imports: US$84 million (2014–2022)
- Annual exports: US$2.60 billion (2014–2022)

Related articles
- History: Military history of France; Warfare directory of France; Wars involving France; Battles involving France
- Ranks: Army ranks Navy ranks Air and Space Force ranks

The French Armed Forces (French: Forces armées françaises, pronounced [fɔʁs aʁme fʁɑ̃sɛːz]) are the military of France. They consist of four service branches: The Army, the Navy, the Air and Space Force, and the National Gendarmerie. The National Guard serves as the French Armed Forces' military reserve force.

Under the French constitution, the president of France serves as commander-in-chief of the French military. The Chief of the Defence Staff, currently Général d'armée aérienne Fabien Mandon, oversees all military operations.

France has the ninth largest defense budget in the world and the second largest in the European Union (EU). It also has the largest military by size in the EU. As of 2025, the total active personnel of the French Armed Forces are 264,000, along with 43,000 reservists; including the National Gendarmerie (which numbered 155,000 in 2024), France's military manpower is 462,000.

France is frequently considered a top-tier military power, often ranking among the top ten due to its global capabilities and independent nuclear umbrella; according to the 2026 Global Firepower Index, the French Armed Forces are the world's sixth most powerful military.

The Armed Forces continuously rank as one the institutions in which the French people have the highest confidence. A 2023 IFOP poll showed that 89% of the French trusted their Armed Forces.

== History ==
The military history of France encompasses an immense panorama of conflicts and struggles extending for more than 2,000 years across areas, including modern France, greater Europe, and French territorial possessions overseas. According to British historian Niall Ferguson, the French participated in 50 of the 125 major European wars that have been fought since 1495; more than any other European state. They are followed by the Austrians who fought in 47 of them, the Spanish in 44 and the English (and later British) who were involved in 43. In addition, out of all recorded conflicts which occurred since the year 387 BC, France has fought in 168 of them, won 109, lost 49 and drawn 10.

The Gallo-Roman conflict predominated from 60 BC to 50 BC, with the Romans emerging victorious in the conquest of Gaul by Julius Caesar. After the decline of the Roman Empire, a Germanic tribe known as the Franks took control of Gaul by defeating competing tribes. The "land of Francia", from which France gets its name, had high points of expansion under kings Clovis I and Charlemagne. In the Middle Ages, rivalries with England and the Holy Roman Empire prompted major conflicts such as the Norman Conquest and the Hundred Years' War. With an increasingly centralized monarchy, the first standing army since Roman times, and the use of artillery, France expelled the English from its territory and came out of the Middle Ages as the most powerful nation in Europe, only to lose that status to Spain following defeat in the Italian Wars. The Wars of Religion crippled France in the late 16th century, but a major victory in the Thirty Years' War made France one of the most powerful nations on the continent once more. In parallel, France developed its first colonial empire in Asia, Africa, and in the Americas. Under Louis XIV, France achieved military supremacy over its rivals, but escalating conflicts against increasingly powerful enemy coalitions checked French ambitions and left the kingdom bankrupt at the opening of the 18th century.

Resurgent French armies secured victories in dynastic conflicts against the Spanish, Polish, and Austrian crowns. At the same time, France was fending off attacks on its colonies. As the 18th century advanced, global competition with Great Britain led to the Seven Years' War, where France lost its North American holdings. Consolation came in the form of dominance in Europe and the American Revolutionary War, where extensive French aid in the form of money and arms, and the direct participation of its army and navy led to America's independence. Internal political upheaval eventually led to 23 years of nearly continuous conflict in the French Revolutionary Wars and the Napoleonic Wars. France reached the zenith of its power during this period, dominating the European continent in an unprecedented fashion under Napoleon Bonaparte, but by 1815 it had been restored to its pre-Revolutionary borders. The rest of the 19th century witnessed the growth of the Second French colonial empire as well as French interventions in Belgium, Spain, and Mexico. Other major wars were fought against Russia in the Crimea, Austria in Italy, and Prussia within France itself.

Following defeat in the Franco-Prussian War, Franco-German rivalry erupted again in the First World War. France and its allies were victorious this time. Social, political, and economic upheaval in the wake of the conflict led to the Second World War, in which the Allies were defeated in the Battle of France and the French government surrendered and was replaced with an authoritarian regime. The Allies, including the government in exile's Free French Forces and later a liberated French nation, eventually emerged victorious over the Axis powers. As a result, France secured an occupation zone in Germany and a permanent seat on the United Nations Security Council.

The imperative of avoiding a third Franco-German conflict on the scale of those of two world wars paved the way for European integration starting in the 1950s. France became a nuclear power with its first test of an atomic bomb in Algeria in 1960. Since the 1990s its military action is most often seen in cooperation with NATO and its European partners.

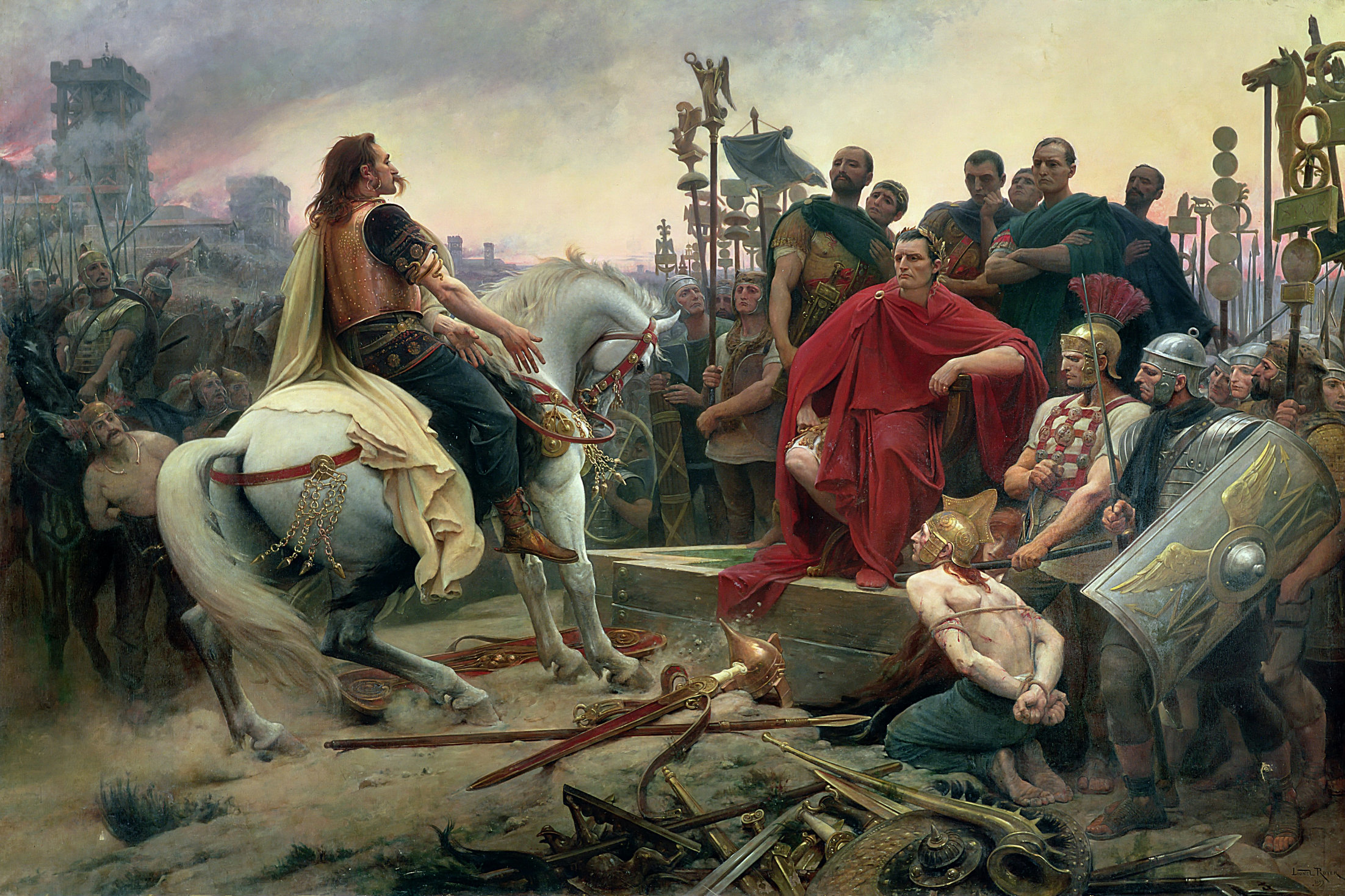
Vercingetorix throws down his arms at the feet of Julius Caesar after the Battle of Alesia during the Roman conquest of Gaul (58–50 BC)

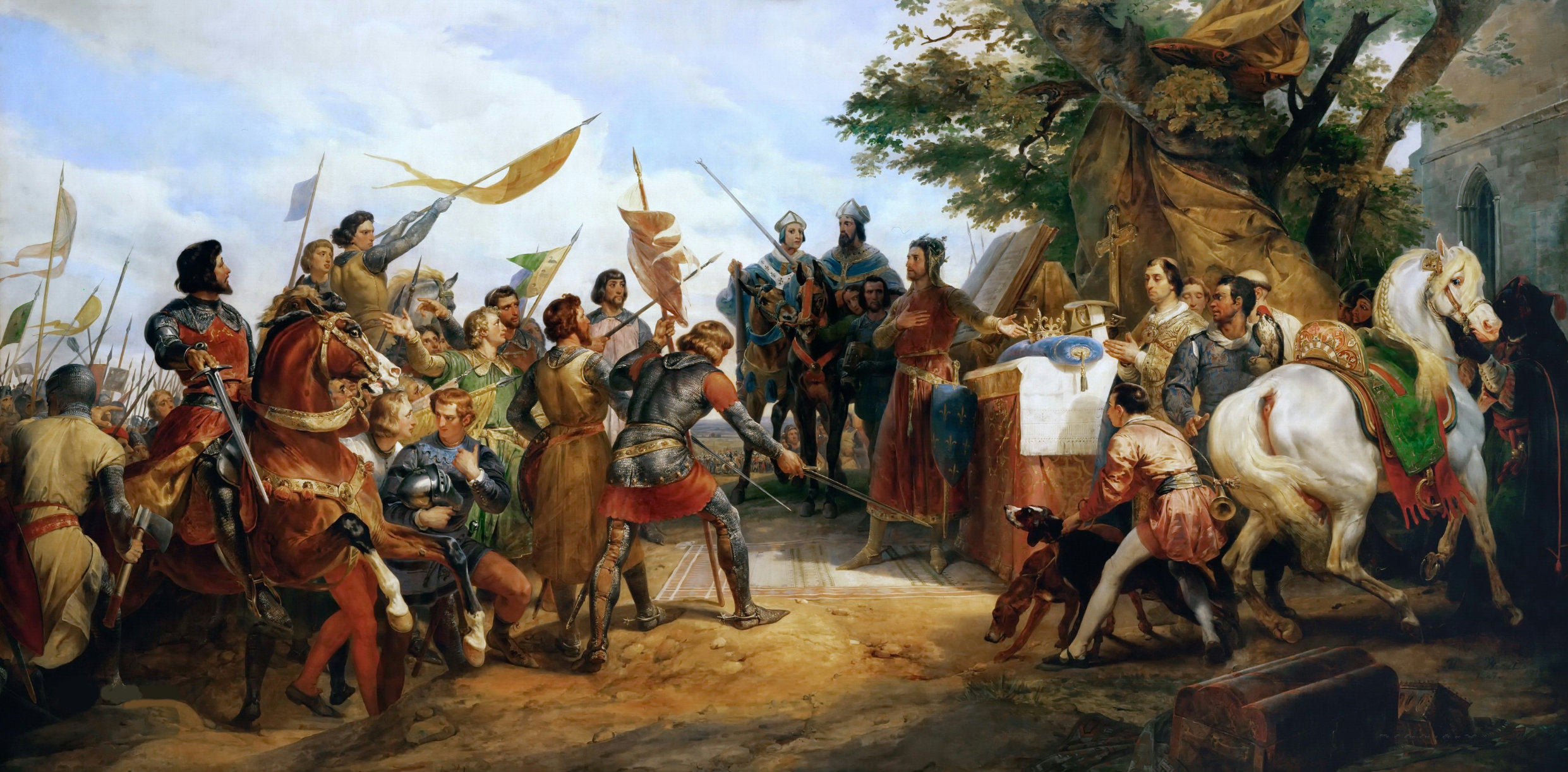
King Philip II shortly before the victorious Battle of Bouvines during the Anglo-French War (1213–1214)

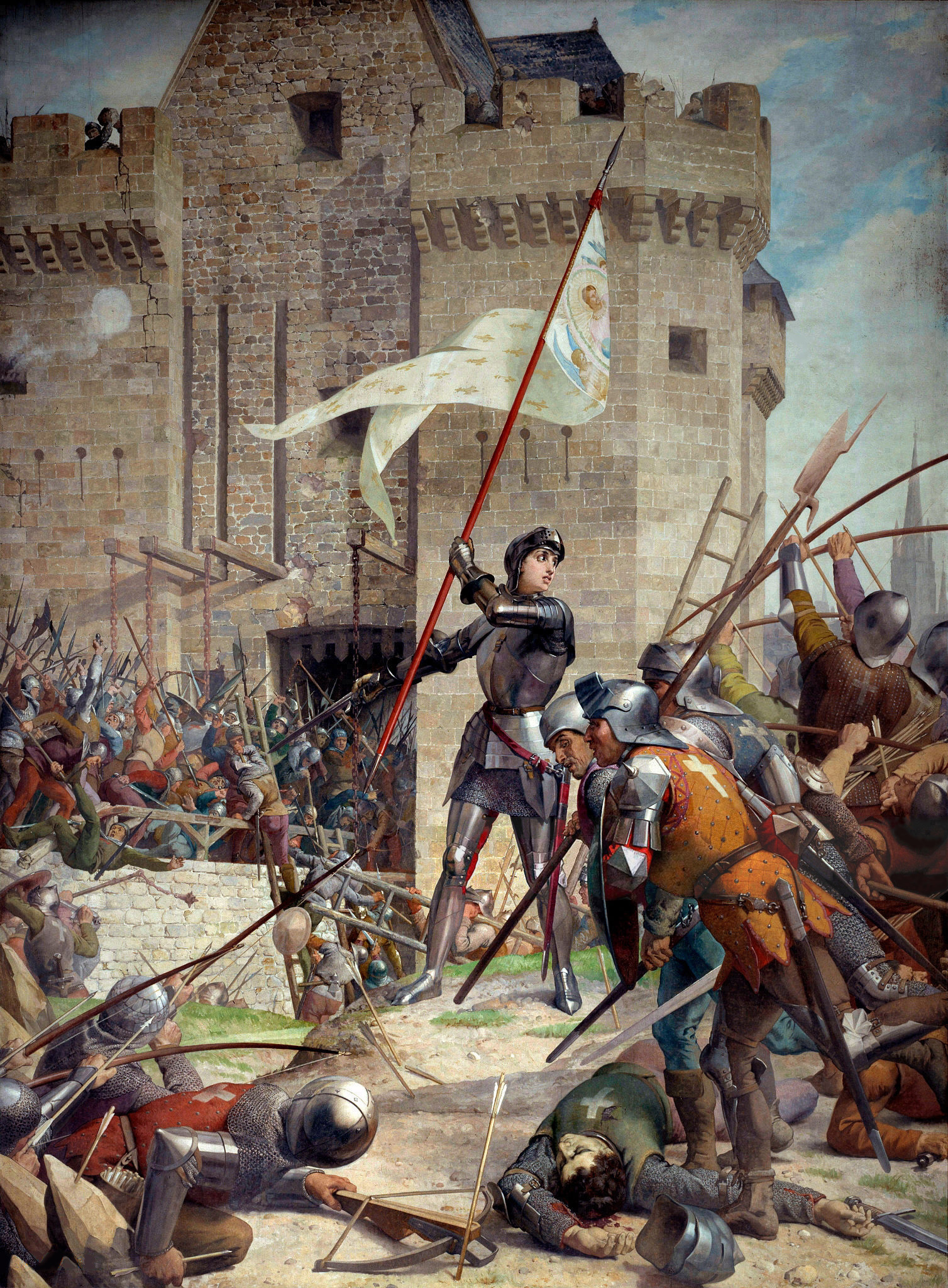
Joan of Arc at the Siege of Orléans during the Hundred Years' War (1337–1453)

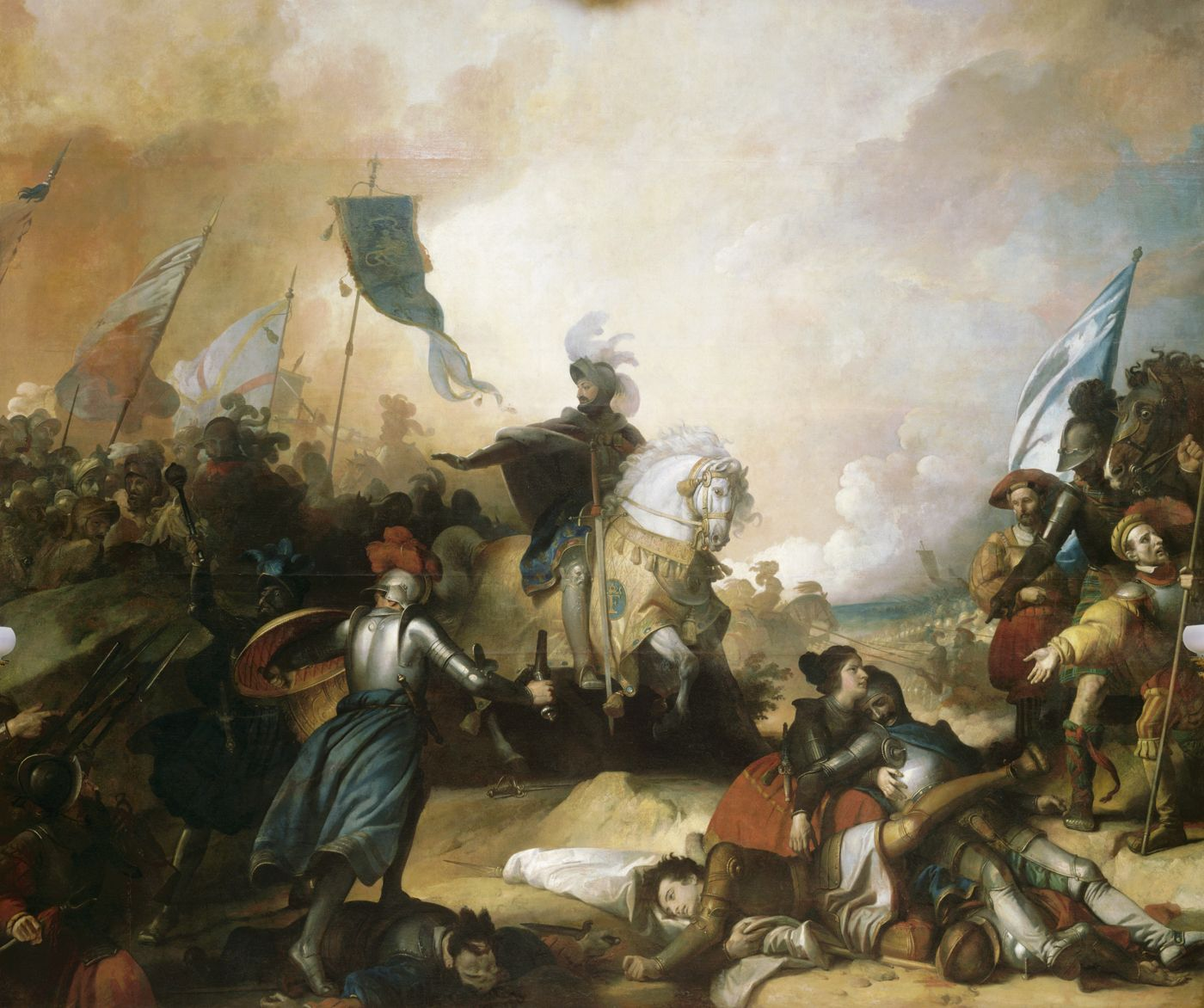
King Francis I at the Battle of Marignano during the Italian Wars (1494–1559)

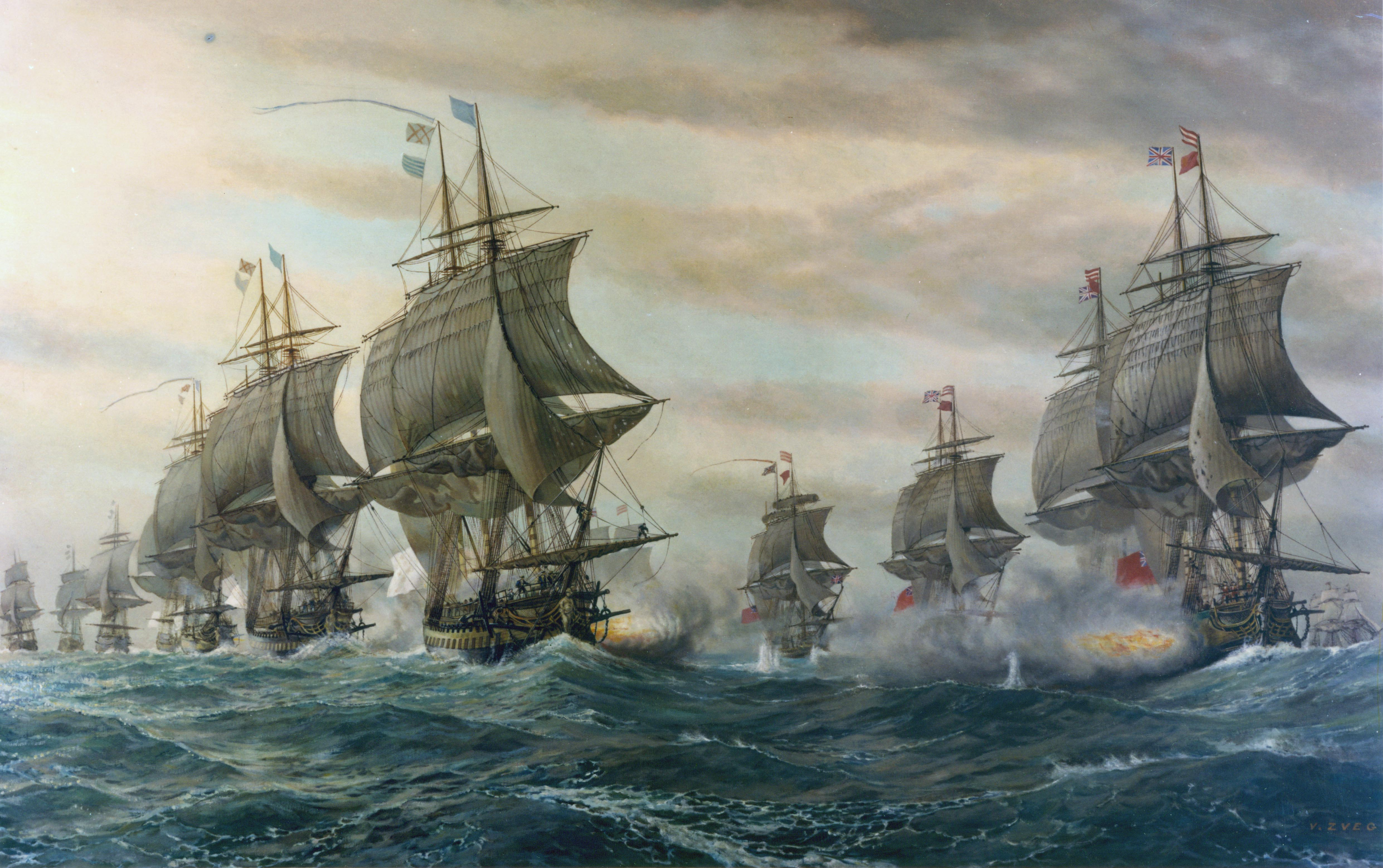
Battle of the Chesapeake during the American War of Independence (1775–1783)

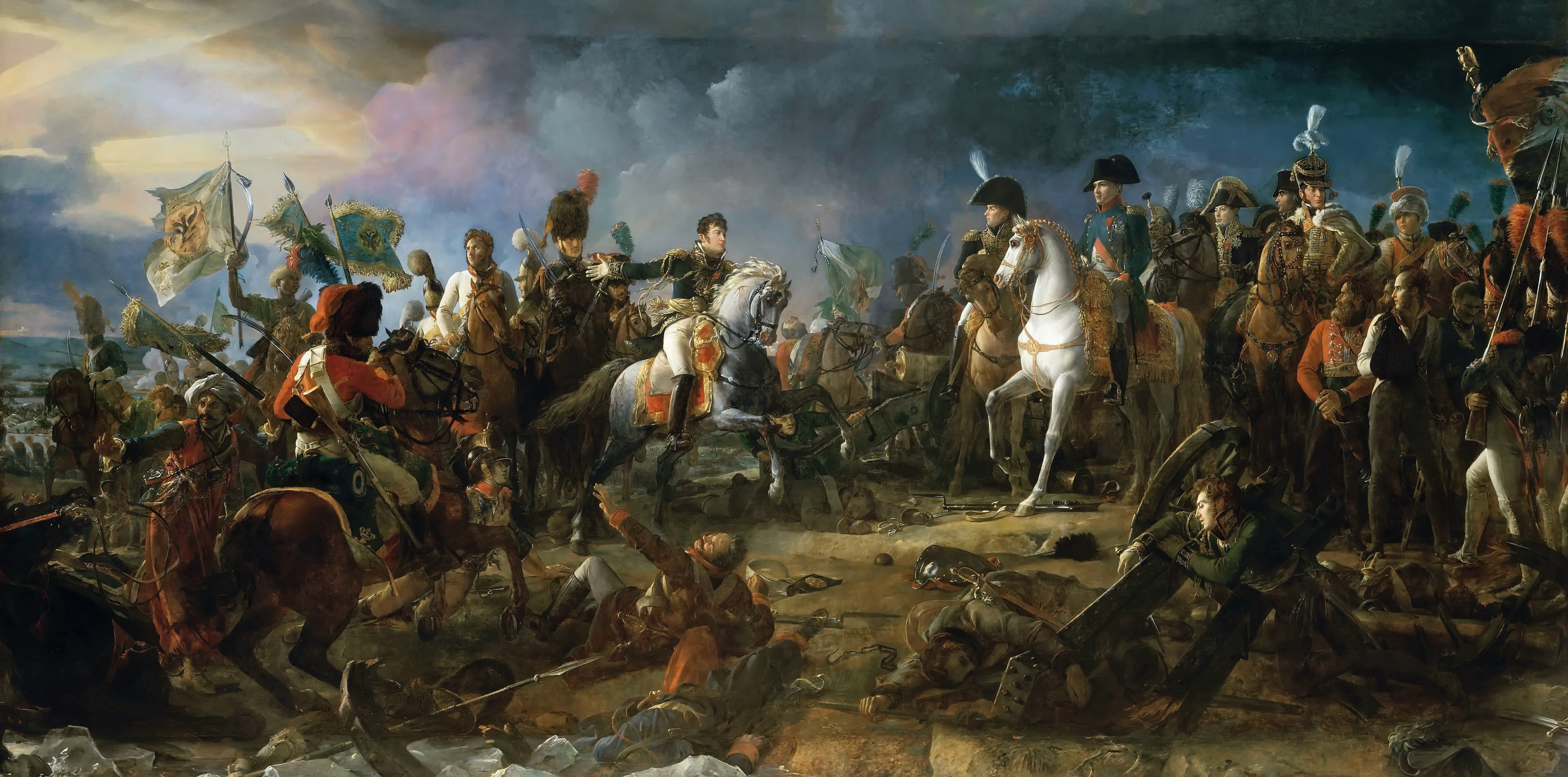
Napoleon Bonaparte at the Battle of Austerlitz during the French Revolutionary and Napoleonic Wars (1792–1815)

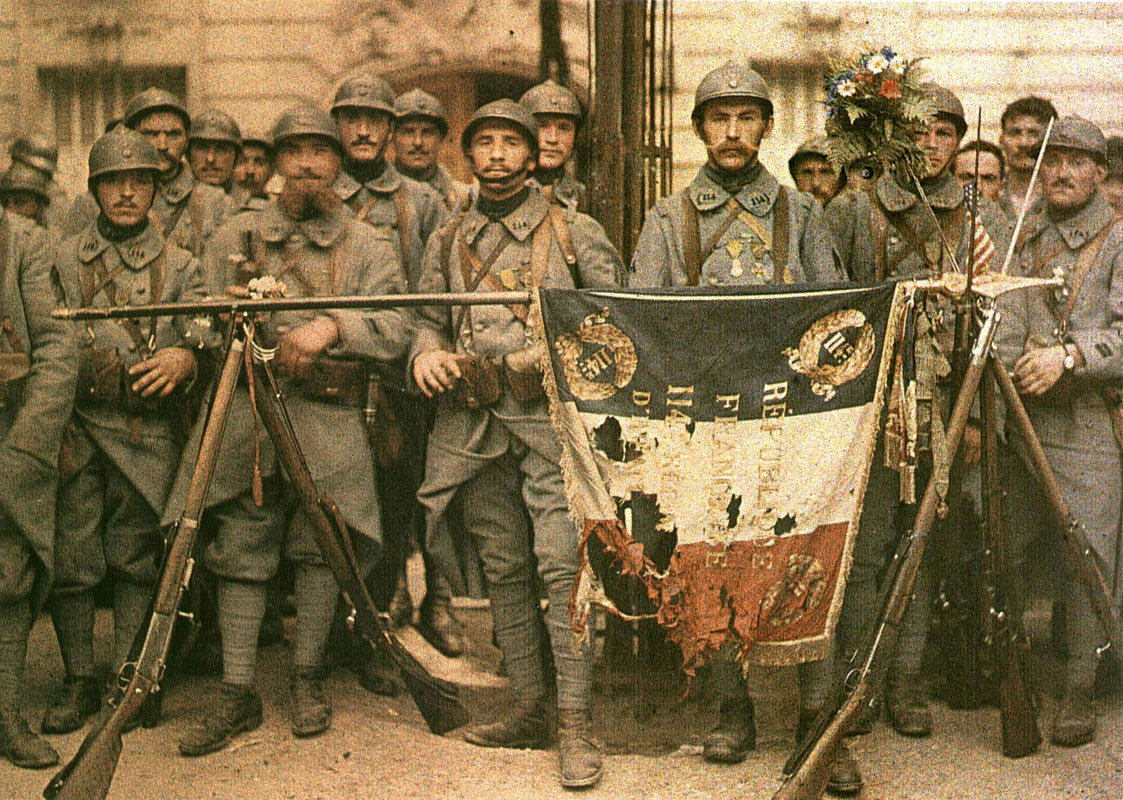
Poilus posing with their war-torn flag in 1917, during the First World War (1914–1918)

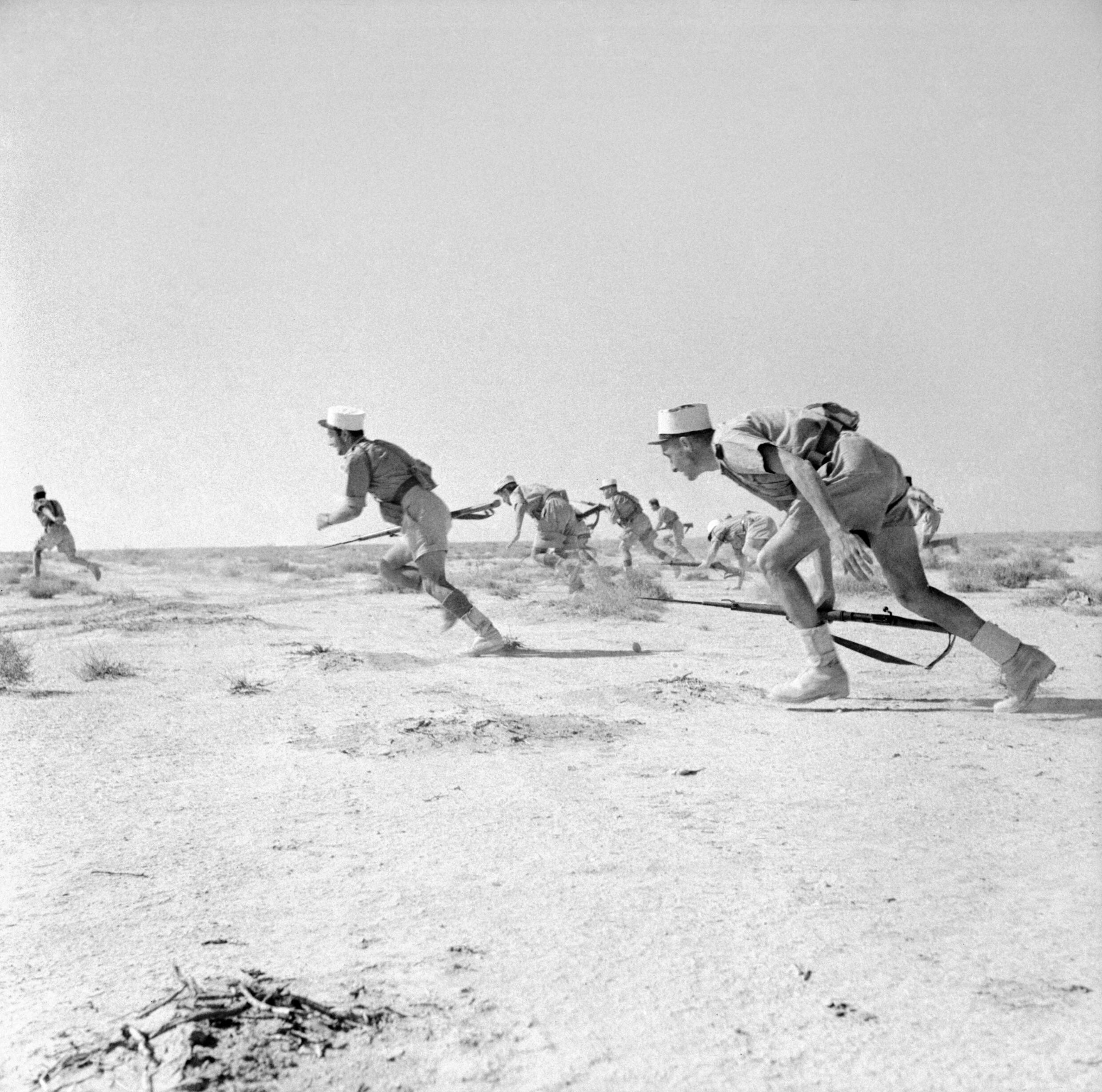
Free French Legionnaires at the Battle of Bir Hakeim during the Second World War (1939–1945)

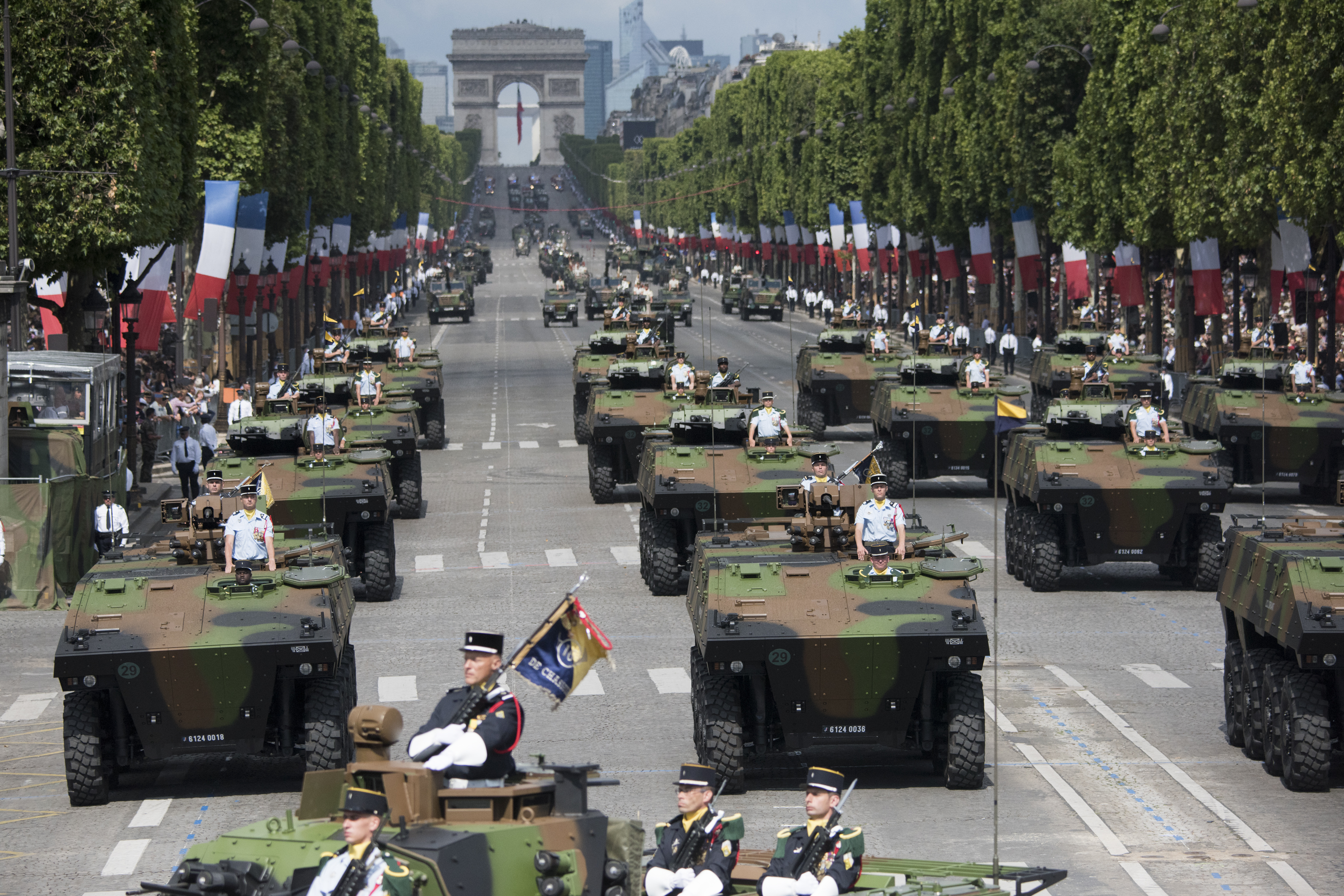
French soldiers, sailors and airmen marching down the Avenue des Champs-Élysées in Paris during the 14 July military parade

== International stance ==
Today, French military doctrine is based on the concepts of national independence, nuclear deterrence (see Force de dissuasion), and military self-sufficiency. France is a charter member of NATO, and has worked actively with its allies to adapt NATO—internally and externally—to the post-Cold War environment. In December 1995, France announced that it would increase its participation in NATO's military wing, including the Military Committee (France withdrew from NATO's military bodies in 1966 whilst remaining full participants in the Organisation's political Councils). France remains a firm supporter of the Organization for Security and Co-operation in Europe and other cooperative efforts. Paris hosted the May 1997 NATO-Russia Summit which sought the signing of the Founding Act on Mutual Relations, Cooperation and Security. Outside of NATO, France has actively and heavily participated in both coalition and unilateral peacekeeping efforts in Africa, the Middle East, and the Balkans, frequently taking a lead role in these operations. France has undertaken a major restructuring to develop a professional military that will be smaller, more rapidly deployable, and better tailored for operations outside of mainland France. Key elements of the restructuring include: reducing personnel, bases and headquarters, and rationalisation of equipment and the armaments industry.

Since the end of the Cold War, France has placed a high priority on arms control and non-proliferation. French Nuclear testing in the Pacific, and the sinking of the Rainbow Warrior strained French relations with its Allies, South Pacific states (namely New Zealand), and world opinion. France agreed to the Nuclear Non-Proliferation Treaty in 1992 and supported its indefinite extension in 1995. After conducting a controversial final series of six nuclear tests on Mururoa in the South Pacific, the French signed the Comprehensive Test Ban Treaty in 1996. Since then, France has implemented a moratorium on the production, export, and use of anti-personnel landmines and supports negotiations leading toward a universal ban. The French are key players in the adaptation of the Treaty on Conventional Armed Forces in Europe to the new strategic environment. France remains an active participant in: the major programs to restrict the transfer of technologies that could lead to the proliferation of weapons of mass destruction: the Nuclear Suppliers Group, the Australia Group (for chemical and biological weapons), and the Missile Technology Control Regime. France has also signed and ratified the Chemical Weapons Convention.

=== White Papers ===
==== 2008 ====
On 31 July 2007, President Nicolas Sarkozy ordered M. Jean-Claude Mallet, a member of the Council of State, to head up a thirty-five member commission charged with a wide-ranging review of French defence. The commission issued its White Paper in early 2008.

Acting upon its recommendations, President Sarkozy began making radical changes in French defense policy and structures starting in the summer of 2008. In keeping with post-Cold War changes in European politics and power structures, the French military's traditional focus on territorial defence will be redirected to meet the challenges of a global threat environment. Under the reorganisation, the identification and destruction of terrorist networks both in metropolitan France and in francophone Africa will be the primary task of the French military. Redundant military bases will be closed and new weapons systems projects put on hold to finance the restructuring and global deployment of intervention forces. In a historic change, Sarkozy furthermore has declared that France "will now participate fully in NATO," four decades after former French president General Charles de Gaulle withdrew from the alliance's command structure and ordered American troops off French soil.

==== 2013 ====
In May 2014, high ranking defence chiefs of the French Armed Forces threatened to resign if the defence budget received further cuts on top of those already announced in the 2013 White Paper. They warned that further cuts would leave the armed forces unable to support operations abroad.

=== Recent operations ===
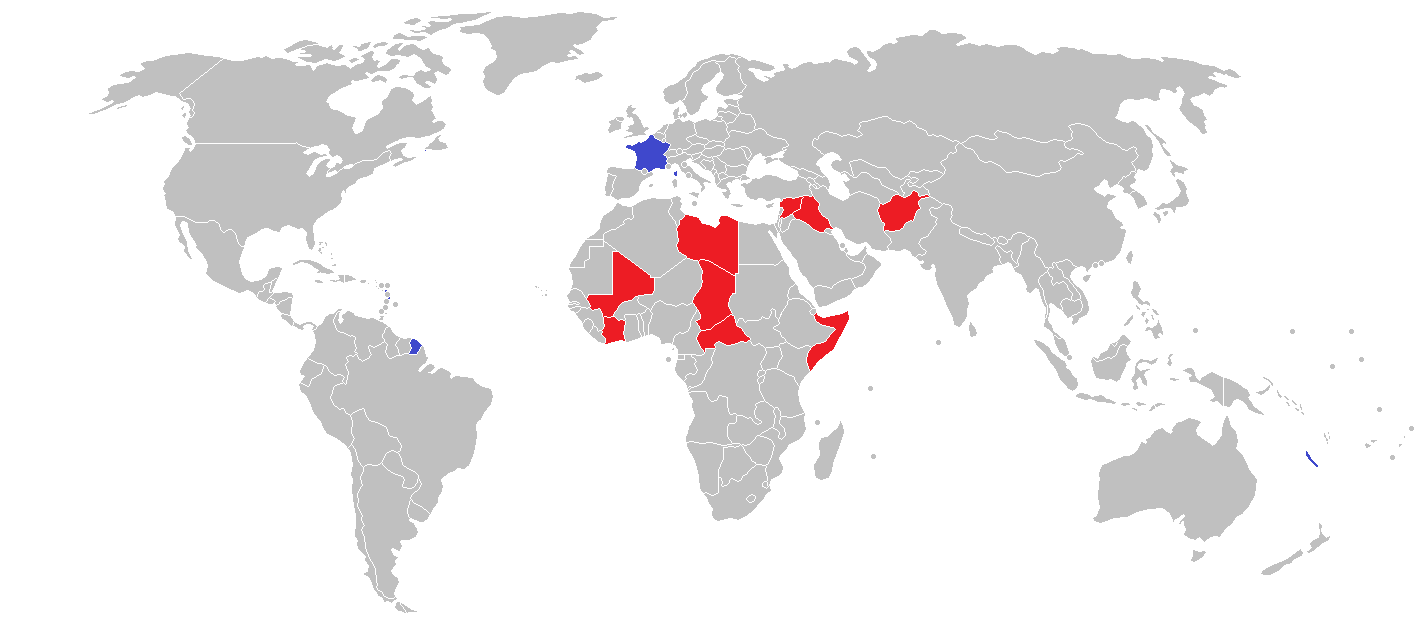
France French military interventions since 2001: Afghanistan, Ivory Coast, Chad, Libya, Somalia, Mali, Central African Republic, Syria, Iraq

There are currently 36,000 French troops deployed in foreign territories—such operations are known as "OPEX" for Opérations Extérieures ("External Operations"). Among other countries, France provides troops for the United Nations force stationed in Haiti following the 2004 Haiti rebellion. France has sent troops, especially special forces, into Afghanistan to help the United States and NATO forces fight the remains of the Taliban and Al Qaeda. In Opération Licorne a force of a few thousand French soldiers is stationed in Ivory Coast on a UN peacekeeping mission. These troops were initially sent under the terms of a mutual protection pact between France and the Ivory Coast, but the mission has since evolved into the current UN peacekeeping operation. The French Armed Forces have also played a leading role in the ongoing UN peacekeeping mission along the Lebanon-Israel border as part of the cease-fire agreement that brought the 2006 Lebanon War to an end. Currently, France has 2,000 army personnel deployed along the border, including infantry, armour, artillery and air defence. There are also naval and air personnel deployed offshore.

The French Joint Force and Training Headquarters (État-Major Interarmées de Force et d'Entraînement) at Air Base 110 near Creil maintains the ability to command a medium or large-scale international operation, and runs exercises. In 2011, from 19 March, France participated in the enforcement of a no-fly zone over northern Libya, during the Libyan Civil war, in order to prevent forces loyal to Muammar Gaddafi from carrying out air attacks on Anti-Gaddafi forces. This operation was known as Opération Harmattan and was part of France's involvement in the conflict in the NATO-led coalition, enforcing UN Security Council Resolution 1973. On 11 January 2013 France begun Operation Serval to fight Islamists in Mali and the Sahal Region with African support but without NATO involvement and launched Operation Barkhane to combat terror in African Sahal from 2014 to 2022.

=== Exercises ===
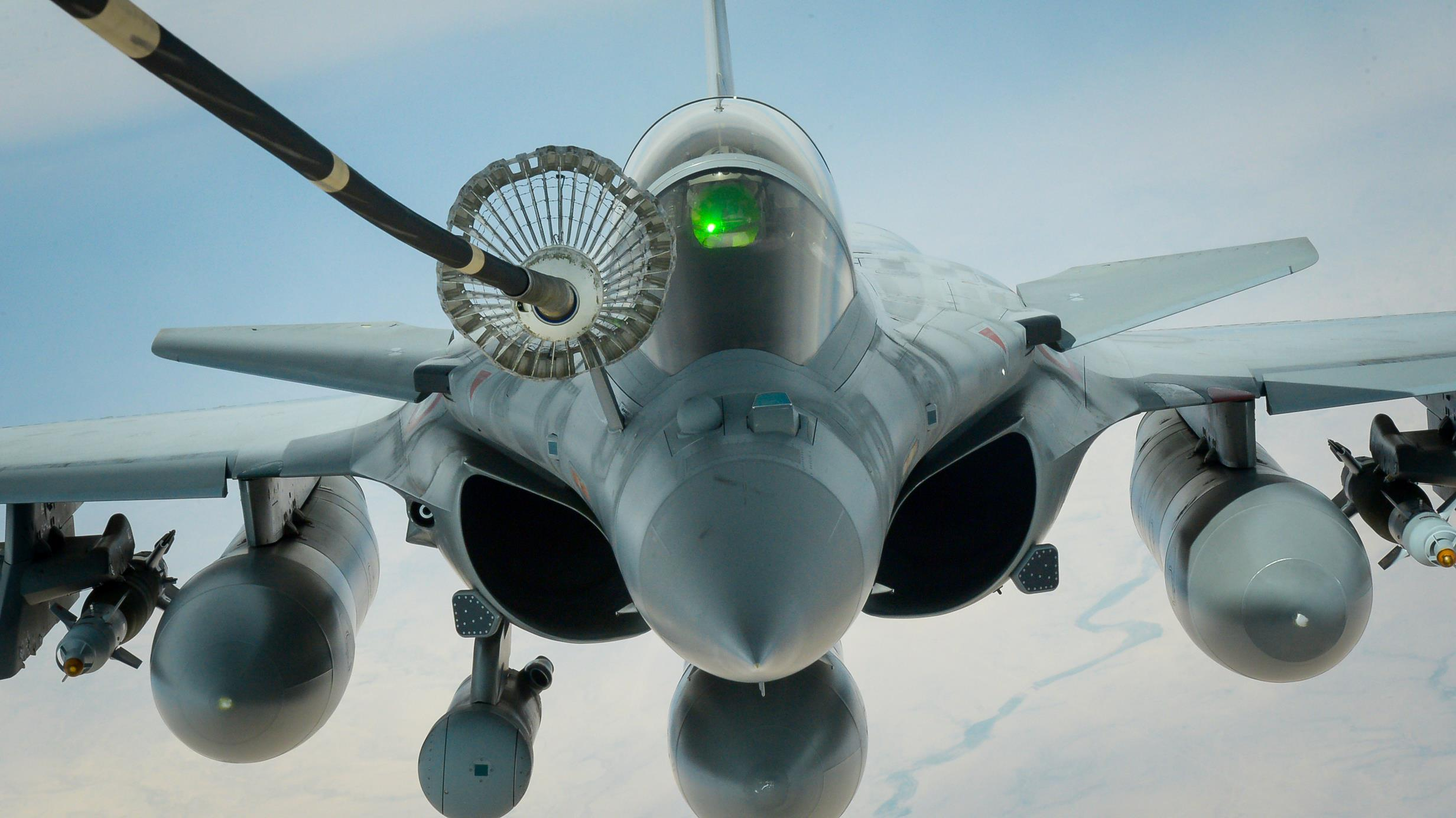
A Dassault Rafale refuels from a USAF KC-10 Extender

France participates in several recurring exercises with other nations, including:

- CRUZEX, joint aerial combat training exercises in Brazil.
- Caraibe 2013, every two years in the Caribbean, centering on Martinique and Guadeloupe.
- Croix du Sud, in New Caledonia every two years with Australia, New Zealand, the United States and other Pacific nations.
- Varuna, an annual naval exercise with India.
- NATO Air Defender 2023, the largest deployment exercise in NATO's history.

In 2023, Exercise Orion, the largest in decades, is to be held in the Champagne-Ardenne region. About 10,000 soldiers are expected to take part, along with the French navy and possibly forces from Belgium, Britain, and the United States.

== Personnel ==
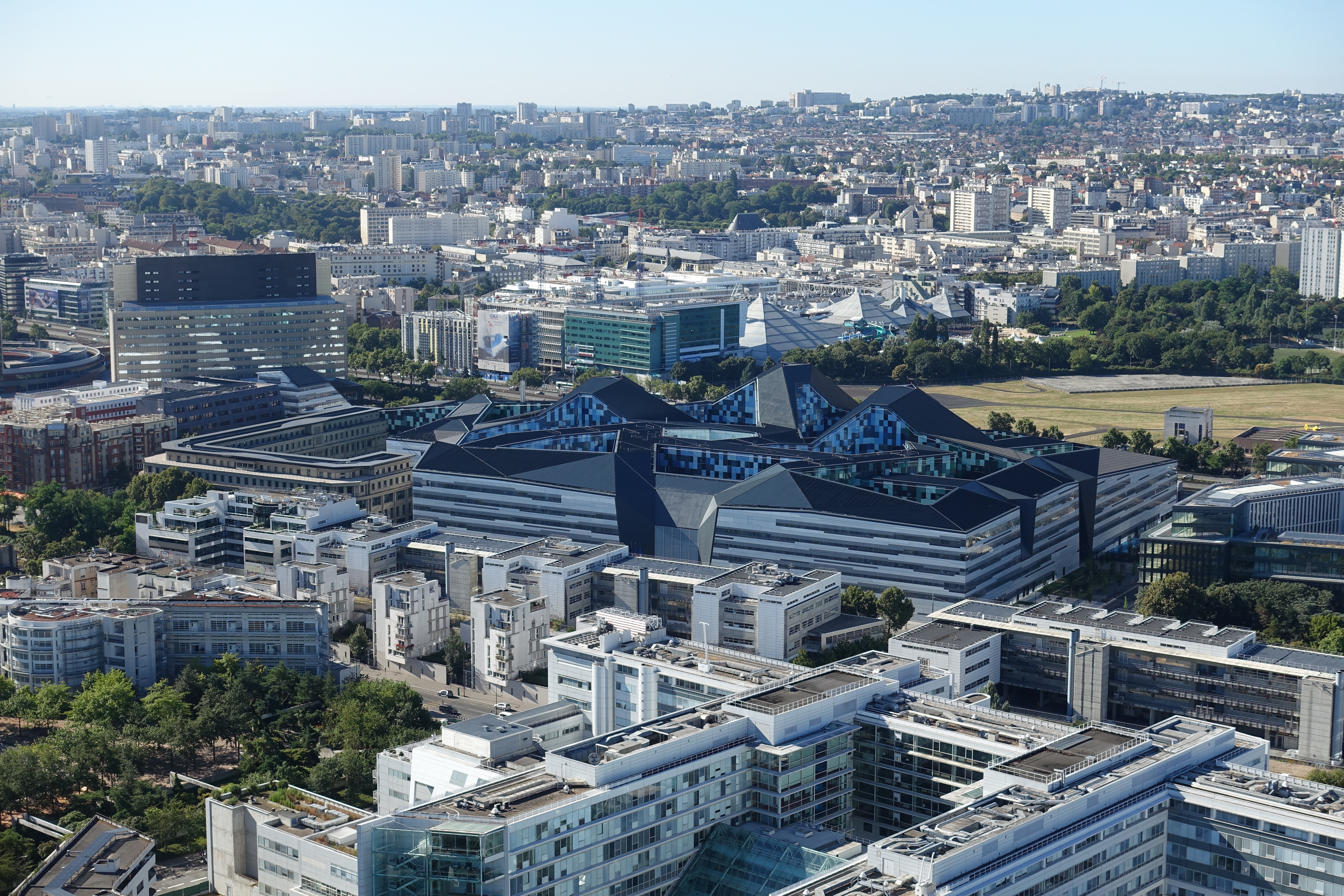
Hexagone Balard, the headquarters of the French Armed Forces

The head of the French armed forces is the President of the Republic, in his role as chef des armées. However, the Constitution puts civil and military government forces at the disposal of the gouvernement (the executive cabinet of ministers chaired by the Prime Minister, who are not necessarily of the same political side as the president). The Minister of the Armed Forces oversees the military's funding, procurement and operations.

Historically, France relied a great deal on conscription to provide manpower for its military, in addition to a minority of professional career soldiers. Following the Algerian War, the use of non-volunteer draftees in foreign operations was ended; if their unit was called up for duty in war zones, draftees were offered the choice between requesting a transfer to another unit or volunteering for the active mission.

In 1996, President Jacques Chirac's government announced the end of conscription and in 2001, conscription formally was ended. Young people must still, however, register for possible conscription (should the situation call for it). As of 2017 the French Armed Forces have total manpower of 426,265, and has an active personnel of 368,962 (with the Gendarmerie Nationale).

It breaks down as follows (2022):

- The French Army; 118,600 personnel.
- The French Air and Space Force; 43,597 personnel.
- The French Navy; 36,044 personnel.
- Tri-service DHS, SEO, and DGA; 17,647 personnel in medical, support and administrative roles, and in the acquisition of weapon systems.

The reserve element of the French Armed Forces consists of two structures; the Operational Reserve and the Citizens Reserve. As of 2022 the strength of the Operational Reserve is 25,785 personnel.

Apart from the three main service branches, the French Armed Forces also includes a fourth military branch called the National Gendarmerie. It had a reported strength of 103,000 active personnel and 25,000 reserve personnel in 2018. They are used in everyday law enforcement, and also form a coast guard formation under the command of the French Navy. There are however some elements of the Gendarmerie that participate in French external operations, providing specialised law enforcement and supporting roles.

Historically the National Guard functioned as the Army's reserve national defense and law enforcement militia. After 145 years since its disbandment, due to the risk of terrorist attacks in the country, the Guard was officially reactivated, this time as a service branch of the Armed Forces, on 12 October 2016.

Since 2019, young French citizens can fulfill the mandatory service Service national universel (SNU) within the Armed Forces in the service branch of their choice.

== Organisation and service branches ==
Placed under the command of the staffs, the French armed forces include the five service branches, the Army, the National Navy, the Air and Space Force, the National Gendarmerie, and the National Guard, as well as the support services and joint organizations:

=== French Army (Armée de terre) ===
- Special Forces
- Airborne Units (Troupes aéroportées)
- Infantry (Infanterie)
- Armoured Cavalry (Arme blindée cavalerie)
- Artillery (Artillerie)
- Foreign Legion (Légion étrangère)
- Troupes de Marine
- French Army Light Aviation (Aviation légére de l'armée de terre, ALAT)
- Engineers (Génie)
- Paris Fire Brigade (brigade des sapeurs-pompiers de Paris)
- Signal Corps (Transmissions)
- Transport and logistics (Train)
- Matériel (Supply)
- Intelligence (Renseignement)

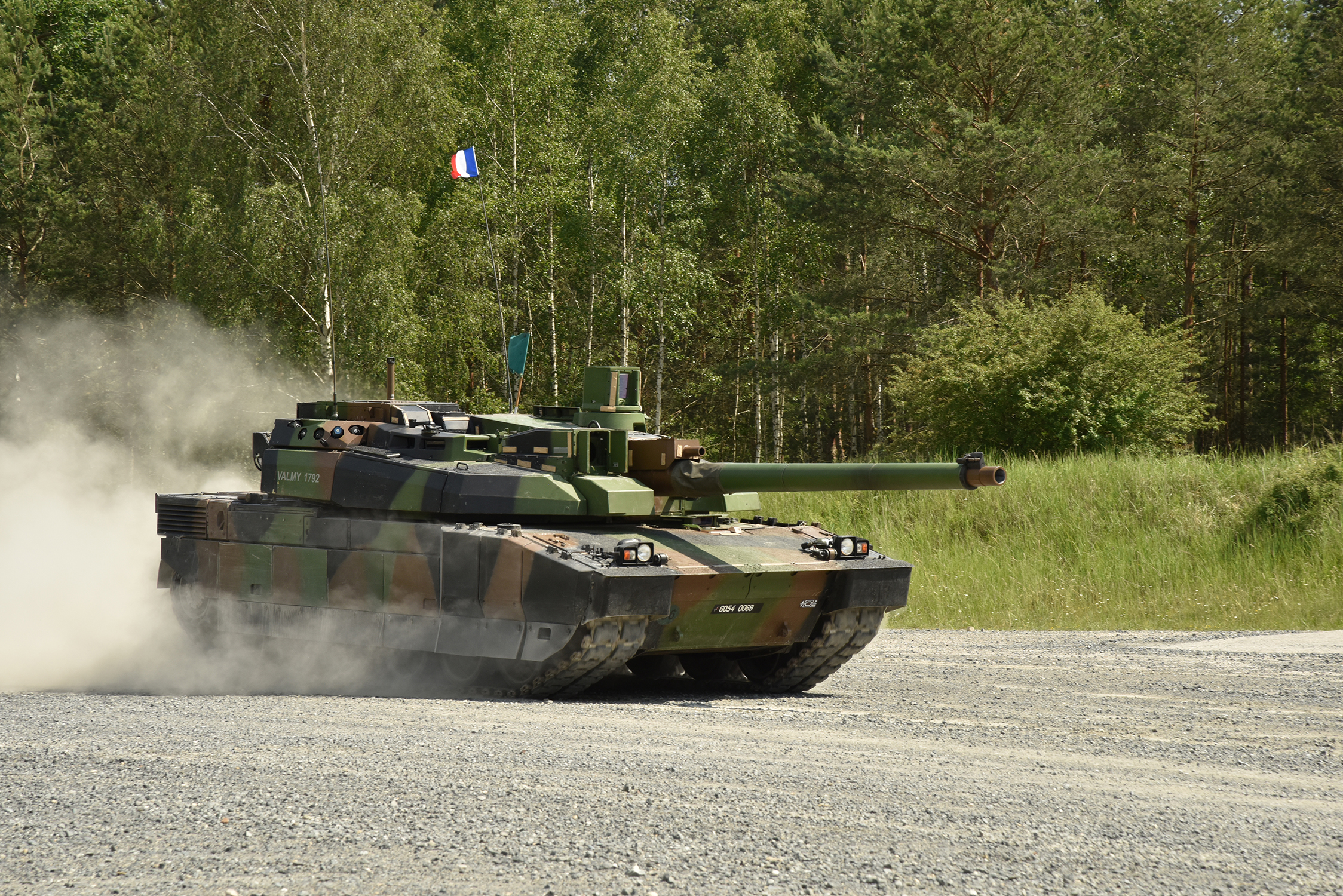
Leclerc main battle tank taking part in the Strong Europe Tank Challenge

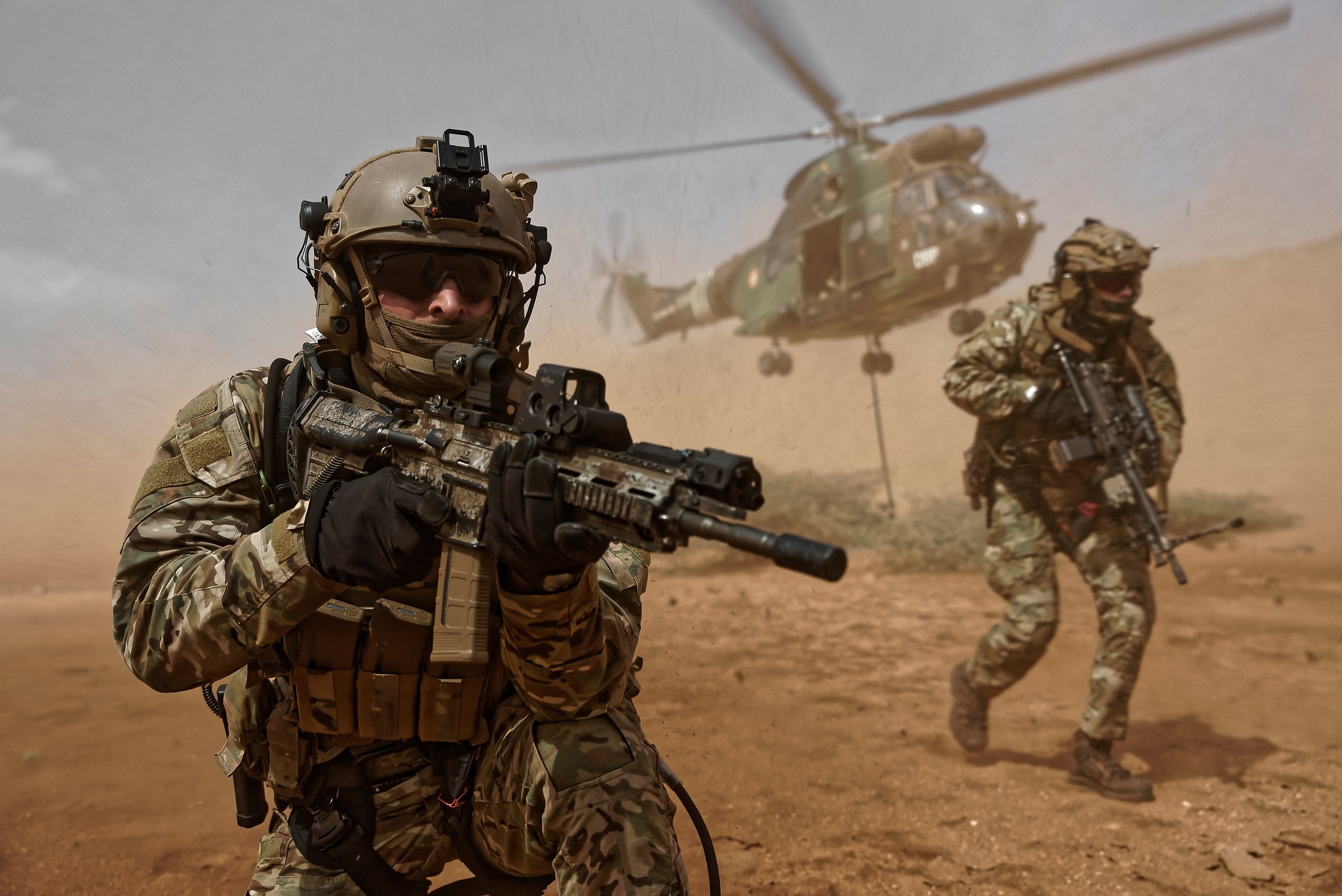
Soldiers of the 13th Parachute Dragoon Regiment in Djibouti

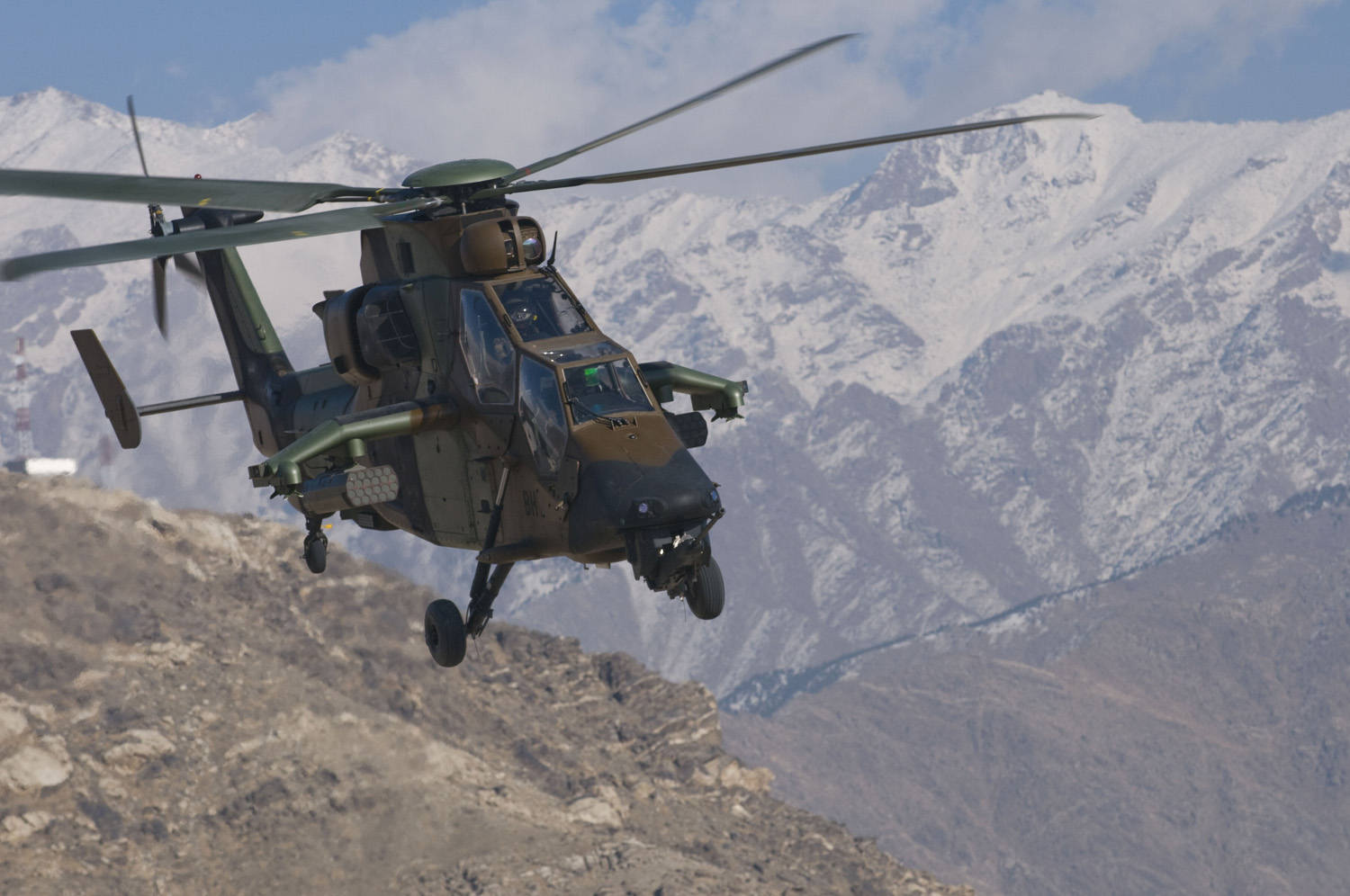
Eurocopter Tiger twin-engine attack helicopter

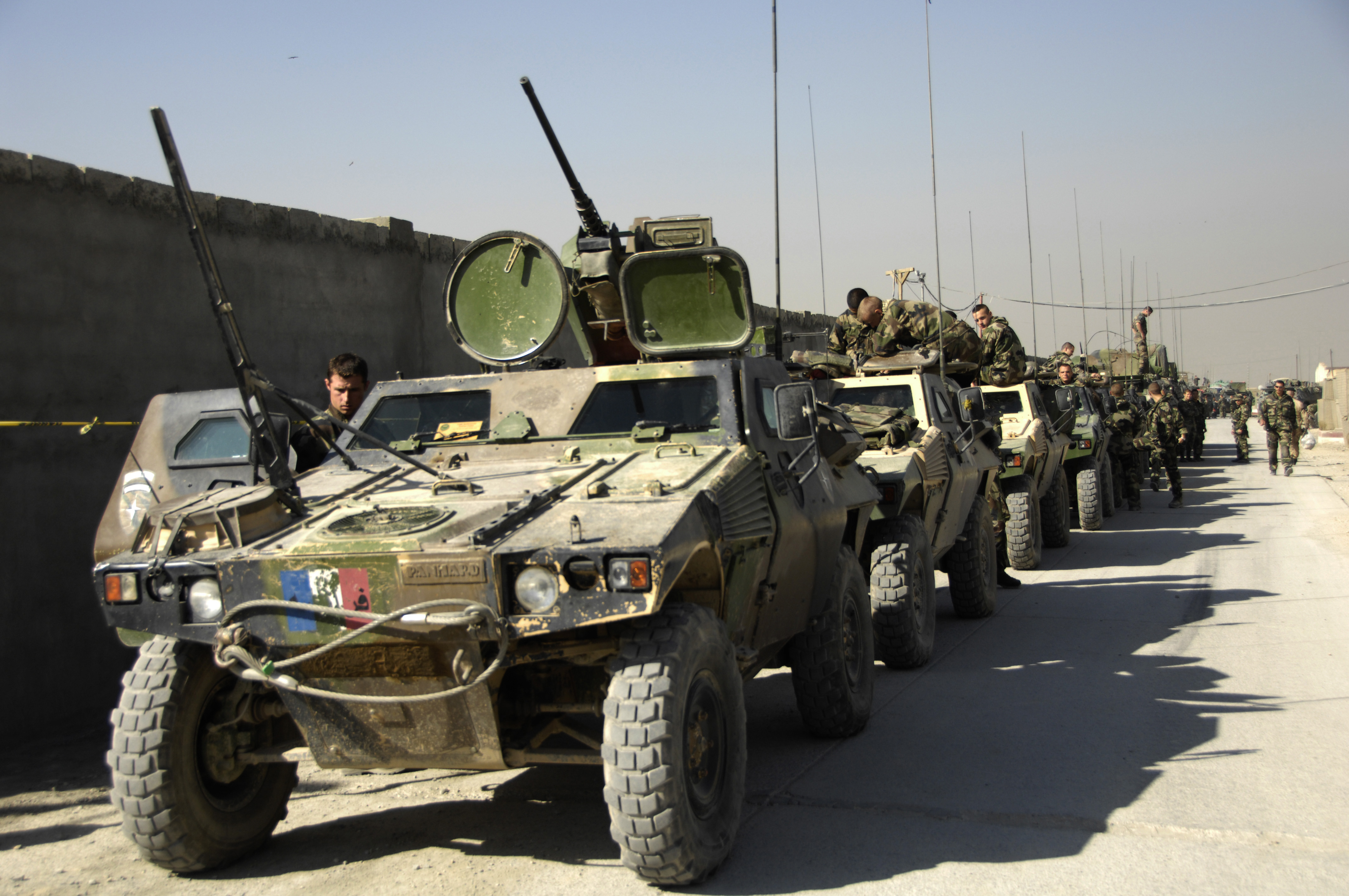
Column of VBLs in Afghanistan

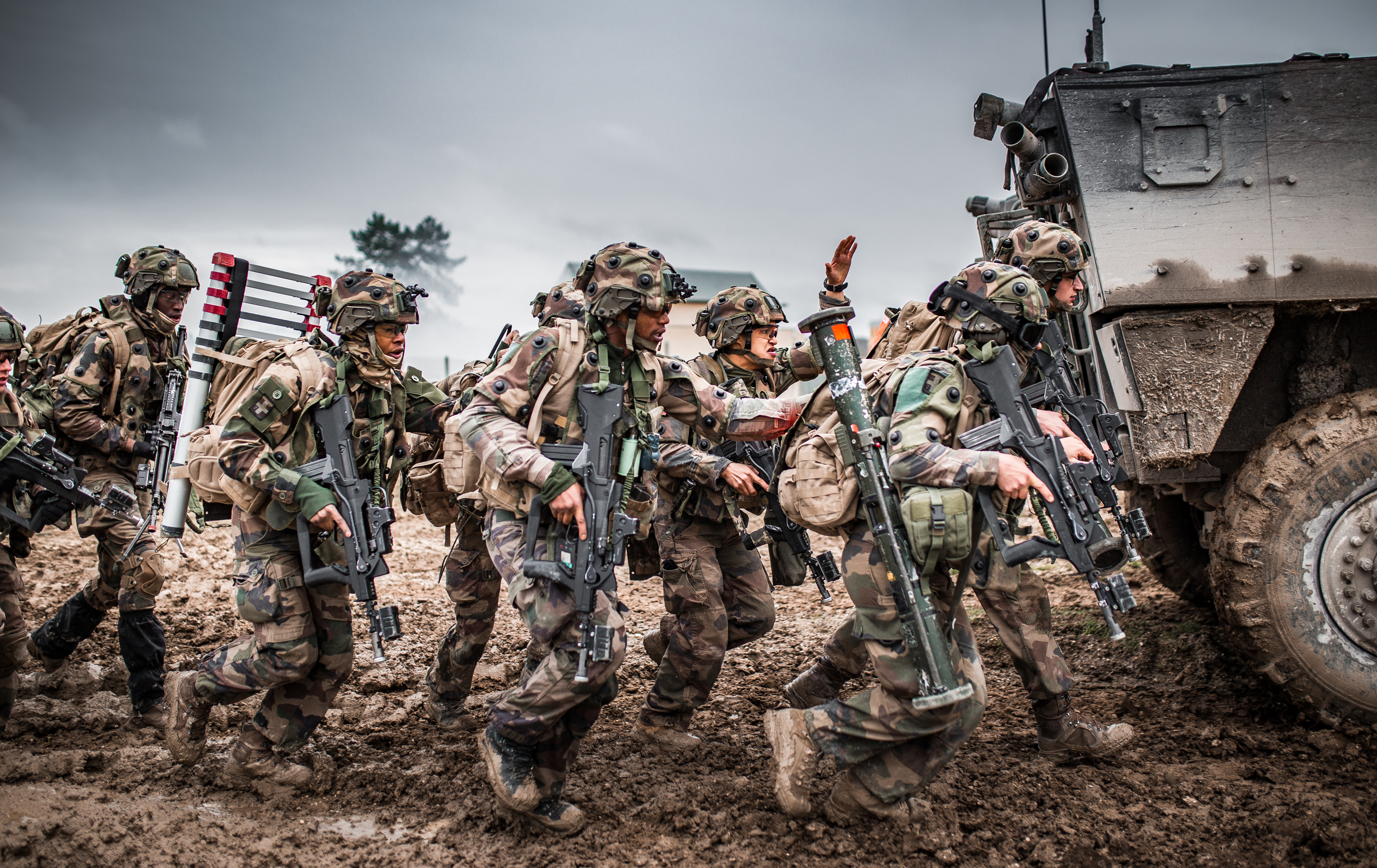
Soldiers of the 35th Infantry Regiment in formation behind a VBCI

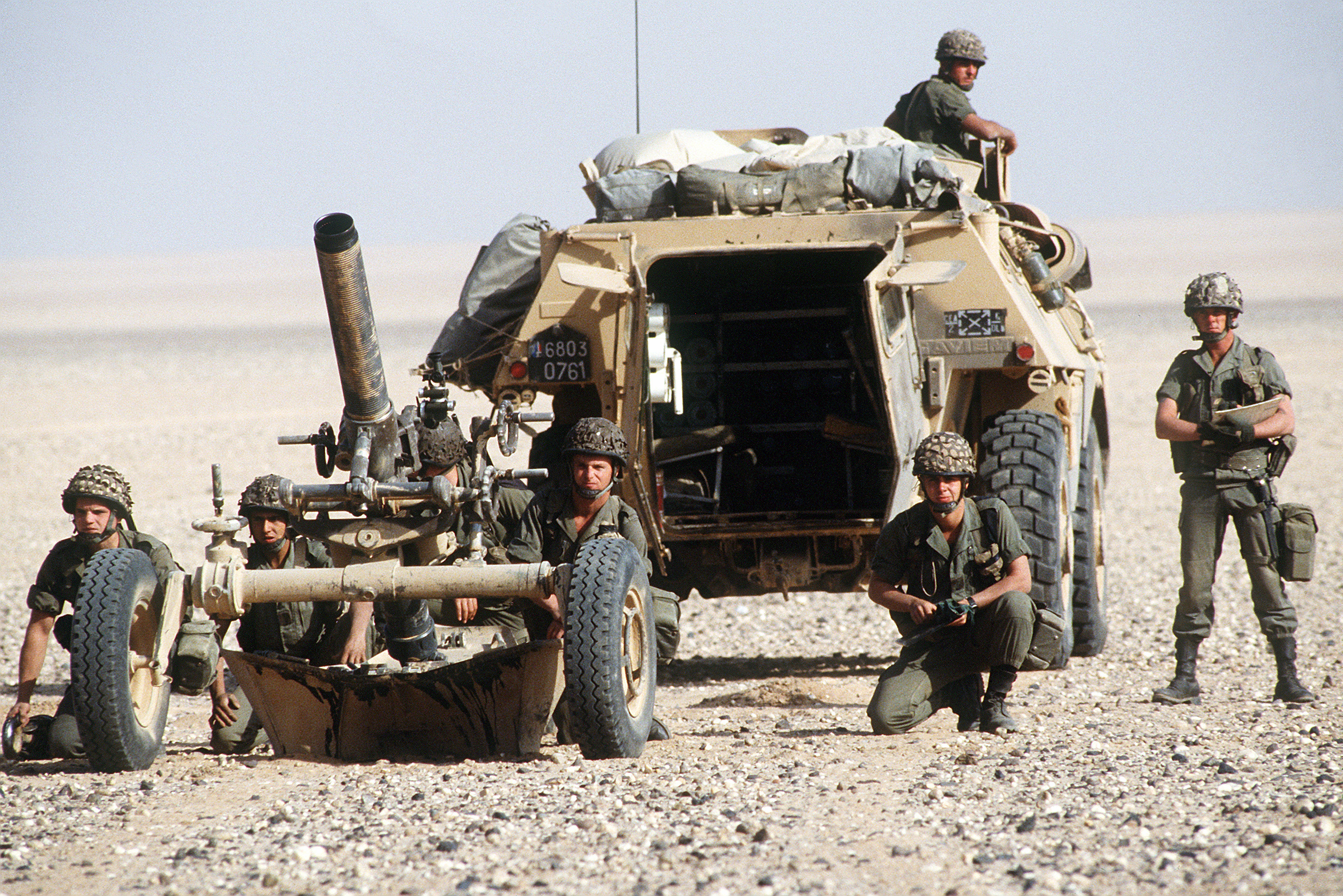
MO-120 RT heavy mortar of the 2nd Foreign Infantry Regiment during Opération Daguet

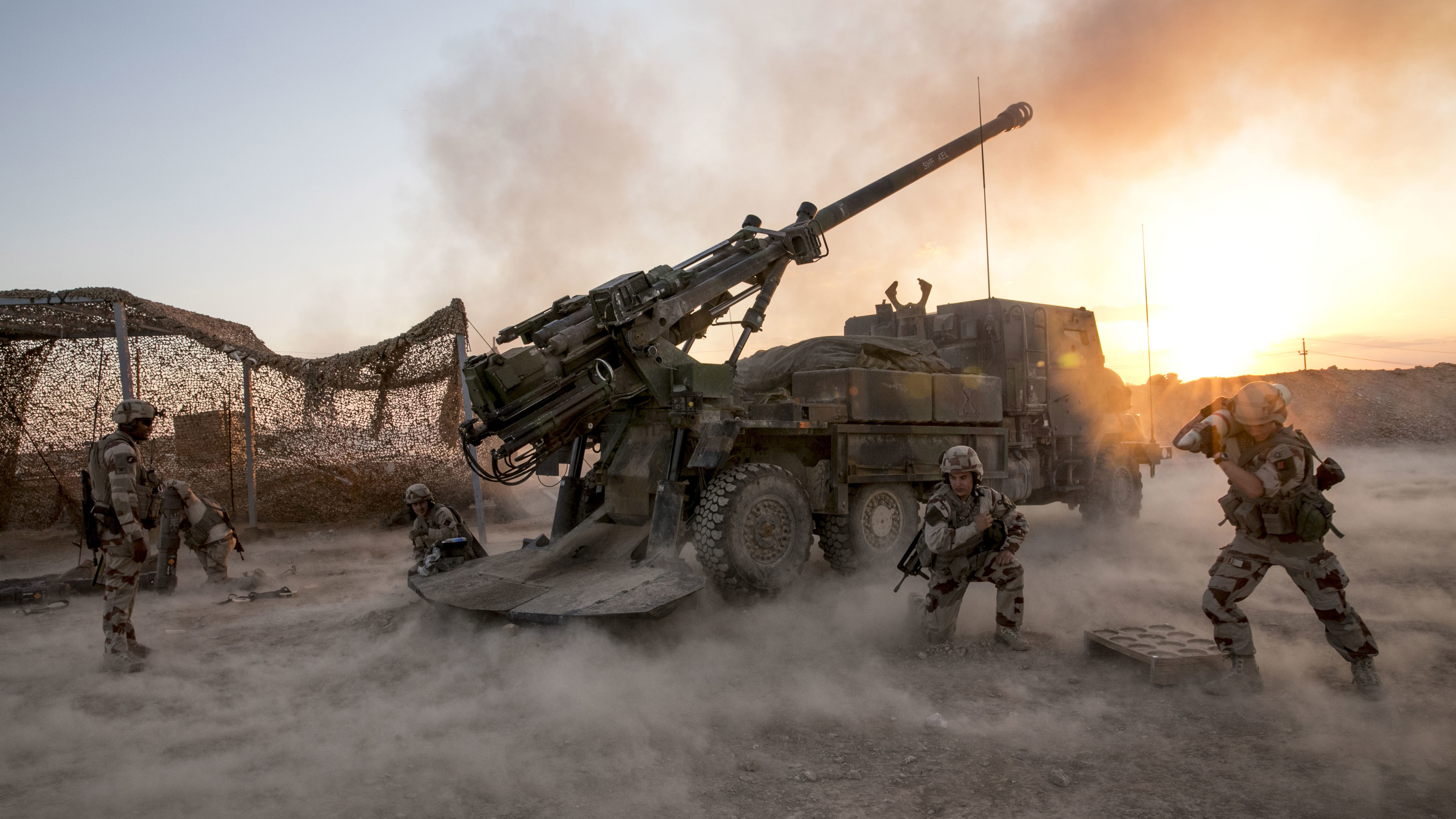
CAESAR self-propelled howitzer on the Iraqi-Syrian border

=== National Navy (Marine nationale) ===
- Parachute Units of the French Navy
  - Naval Infantry and Naval Commandos (Fusiliers Marins)
- Naval Air Arm (Aviation navale)
- Submarine Force (Forces sous-marines)
- Naval Action Force (Force d'action navale)
- The Marseille Marine Fire Battalion

In addition, the National Gendarmerie form a Coast Guard force called the Gendarmerie Maritime which is commanded by the French Navy.

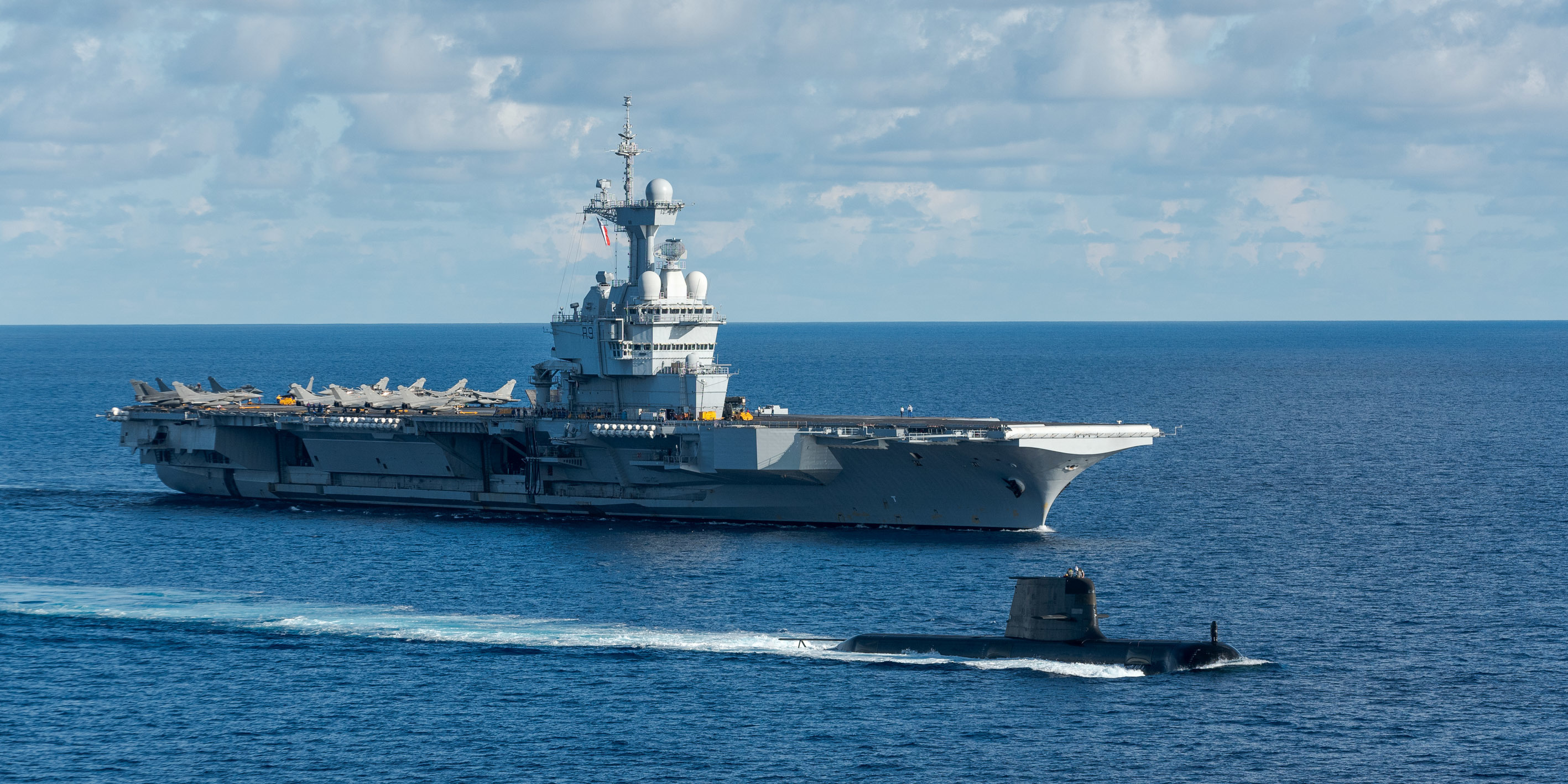
Charles de Gaulle (R91) nuclear-powered aircraft carrier

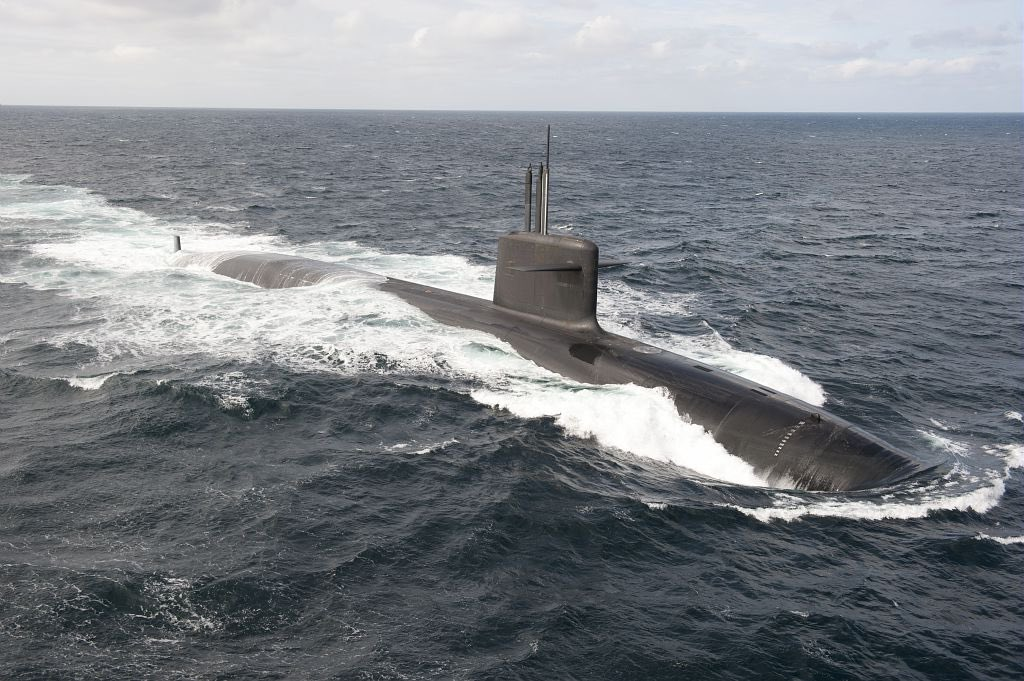
Triomphant-class nuclear ballistic missile submarine

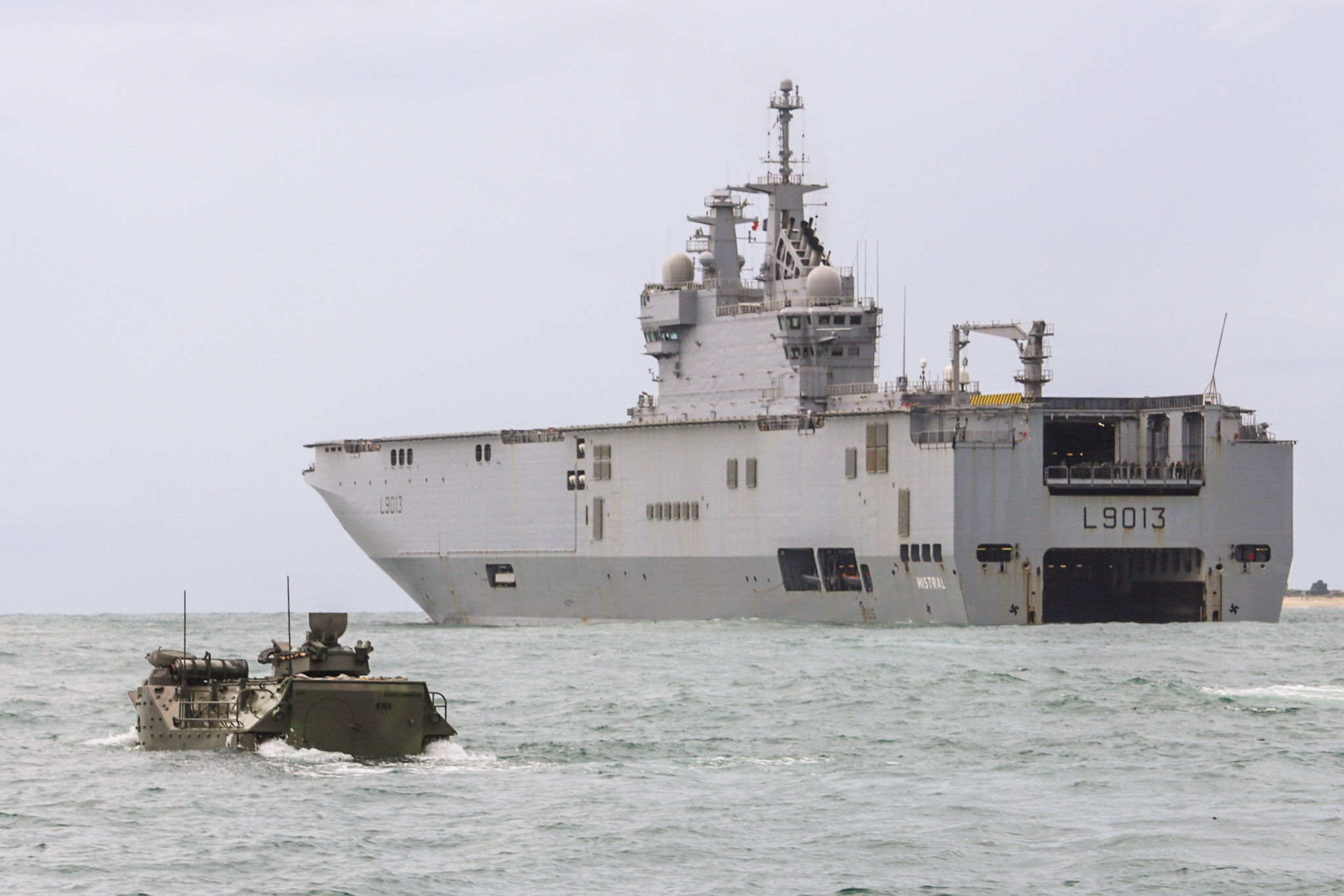
Mistral-class amphibious assault helicopter carrier

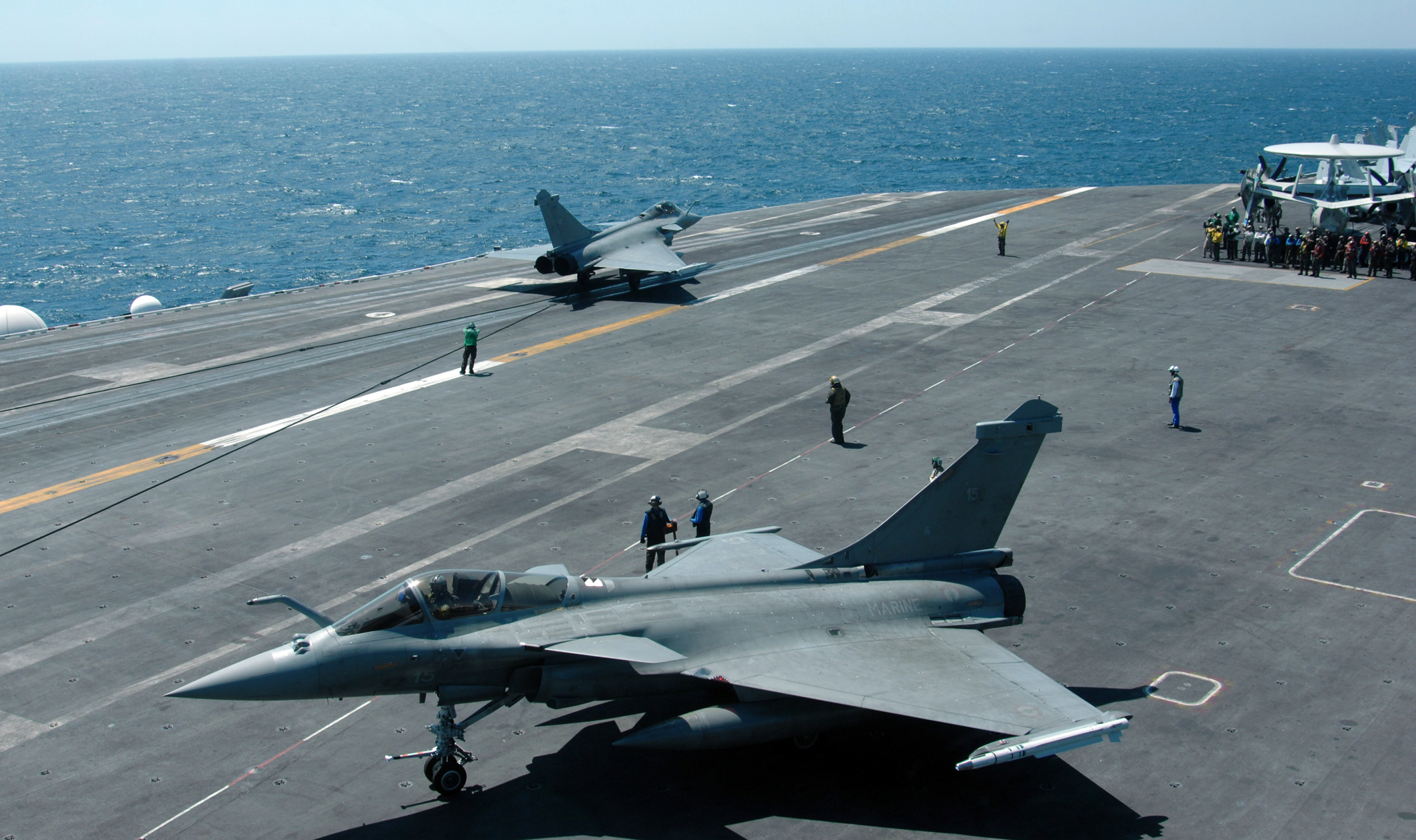
Rafale multirole fighter of the French Naval Aviation

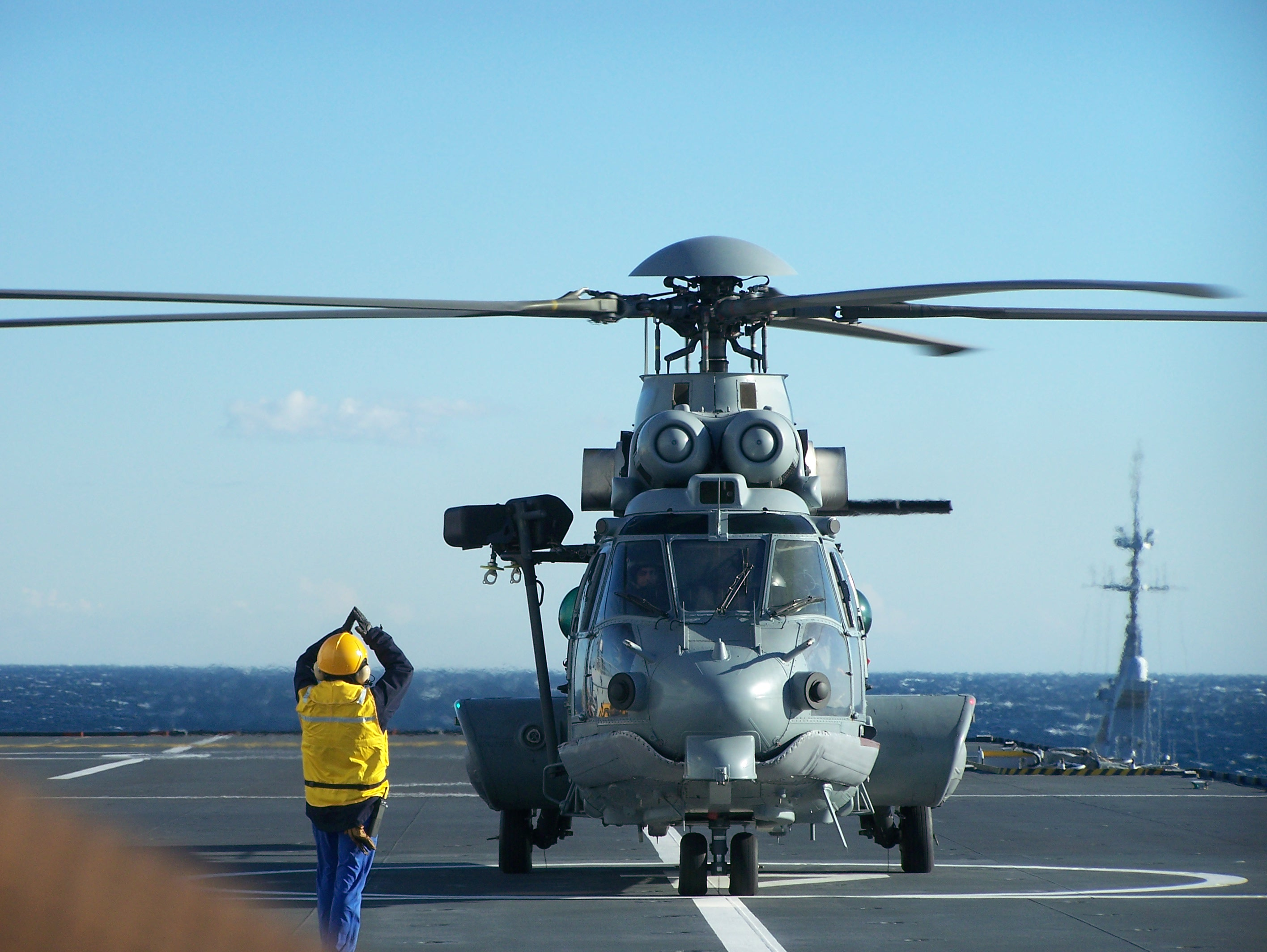
Caracal military transport helicopter

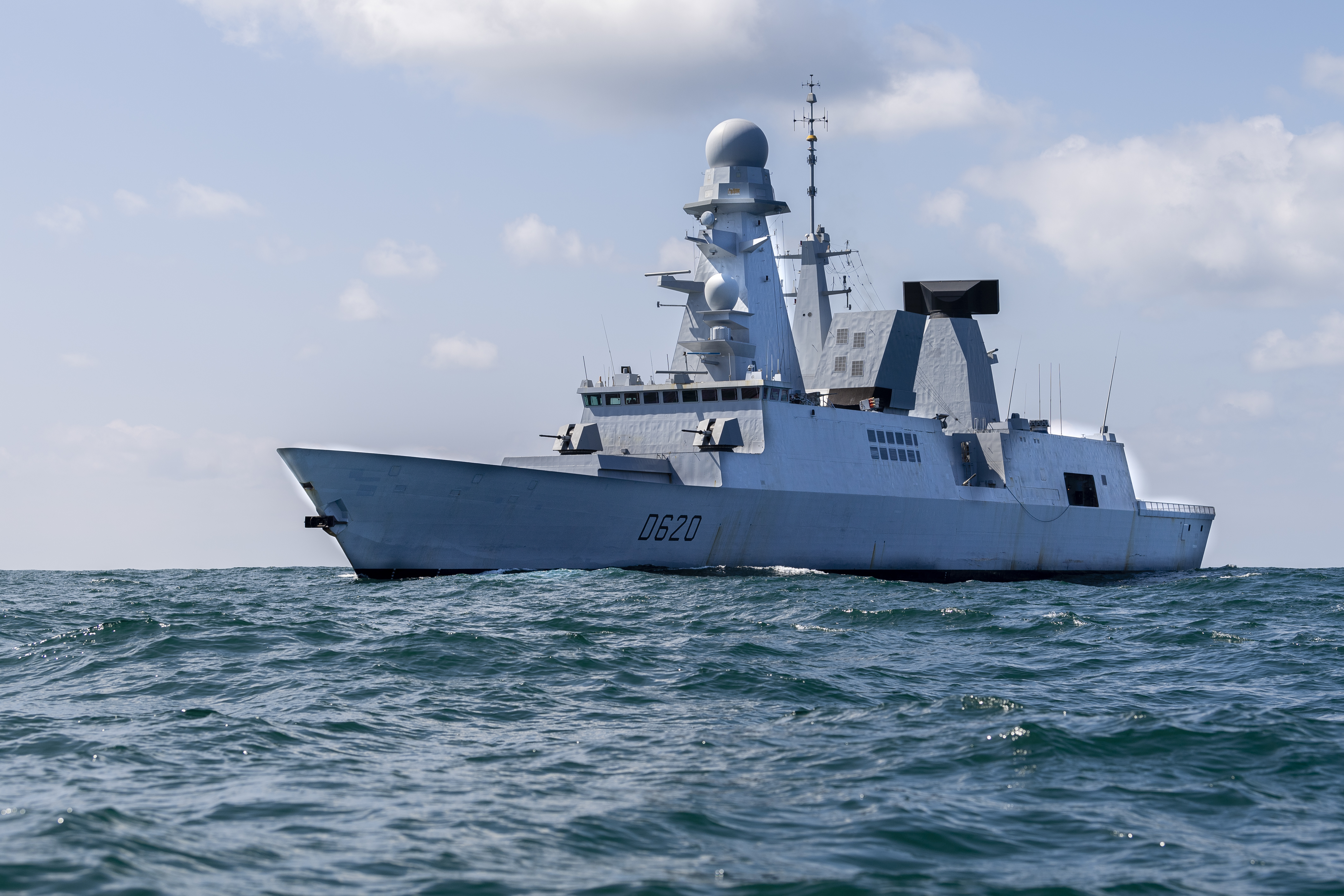
Horizon-class Forbin (D620) frigate

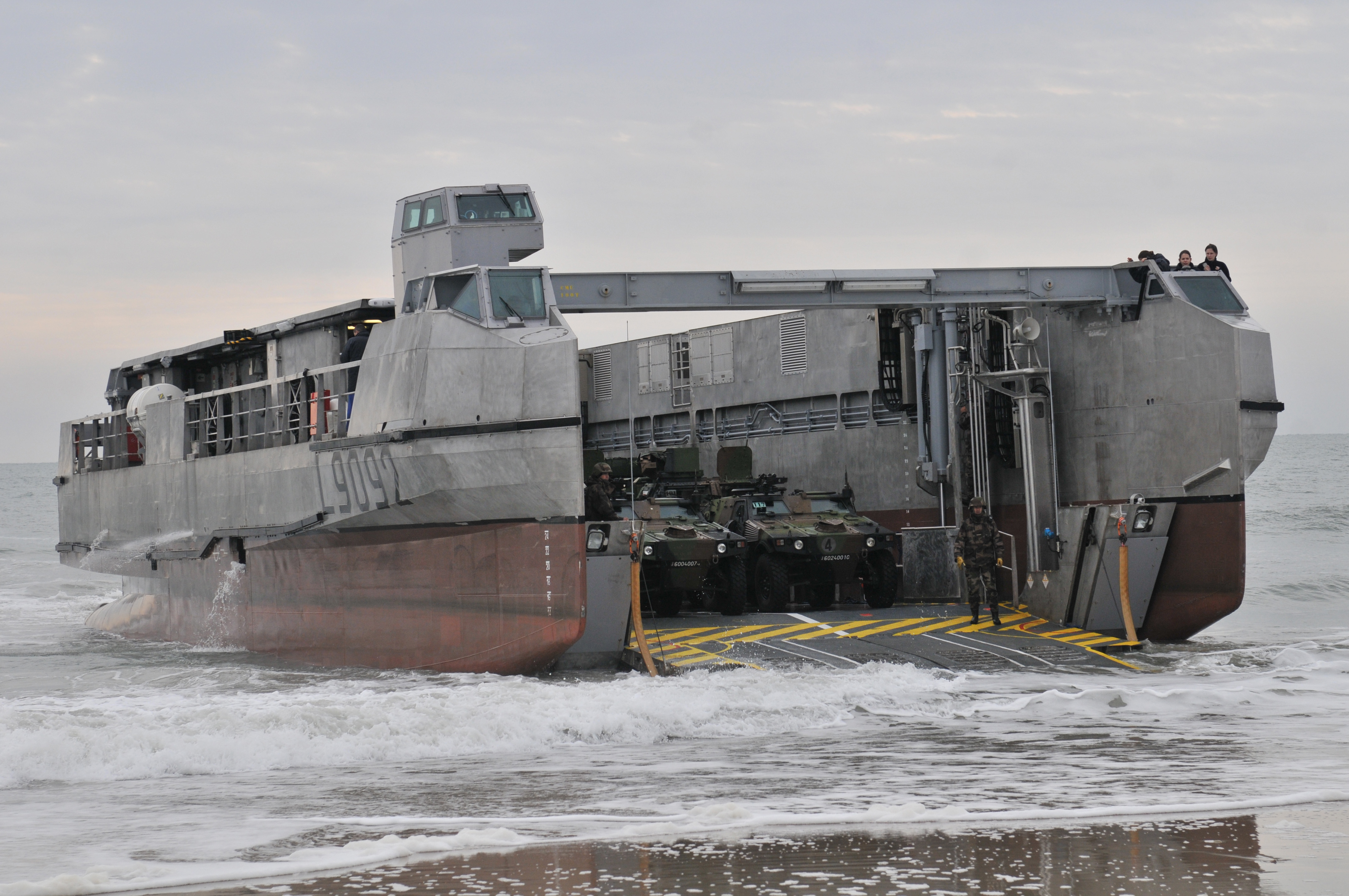
EDA-R, high-speed amphibious landing craft

=== French Air and Space Force (Armée de l'air et de l'espace) ===
- French Space Command
- Parachute Units of the French Air and Space Force
  - Air and space force ground troops (Fusiliers Commandos de l'Air)
  - Paratroopers/Special forces (Commando parachutiste de l'air)
- Territorial Air Defence

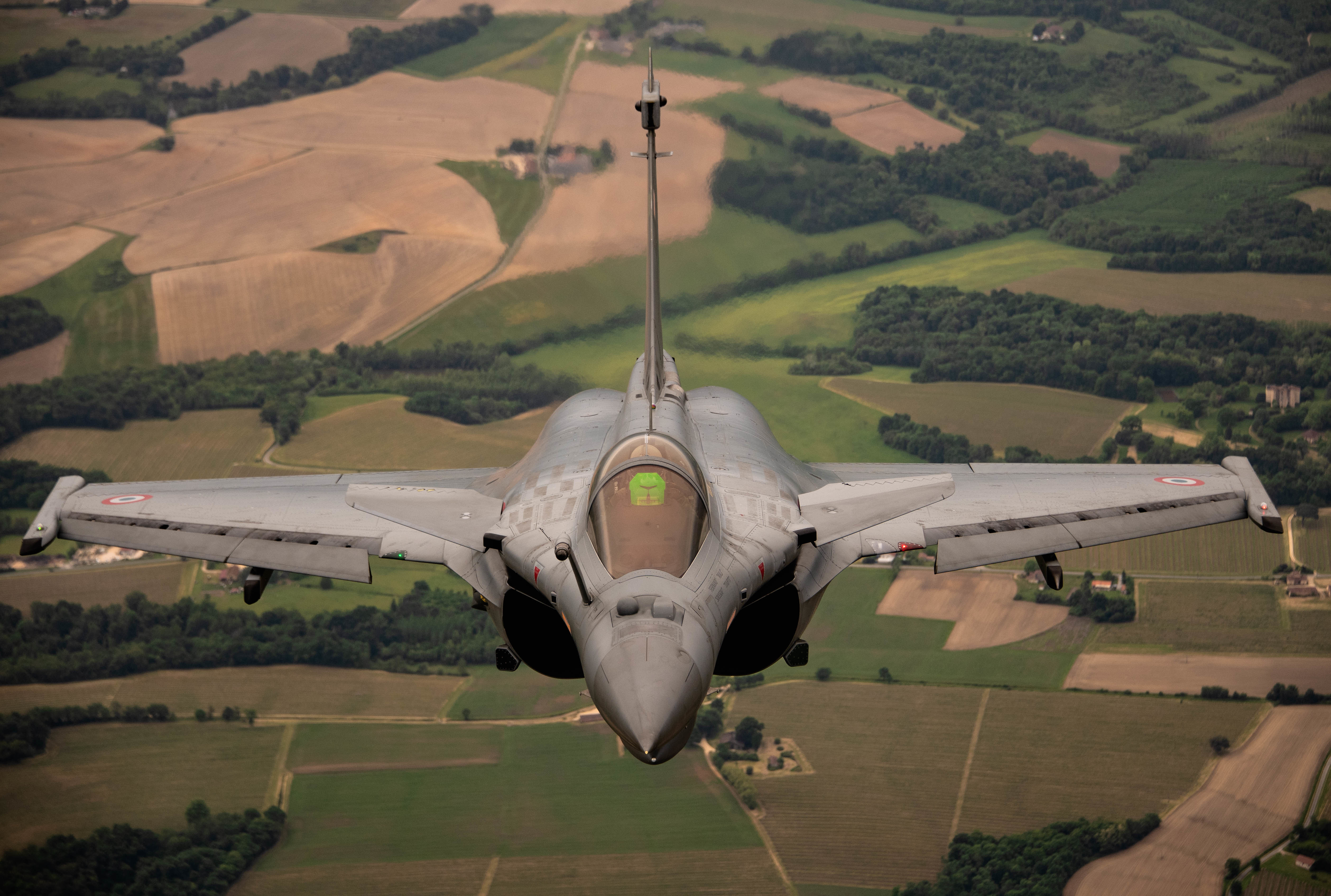
Rafale multirole combat aircraft

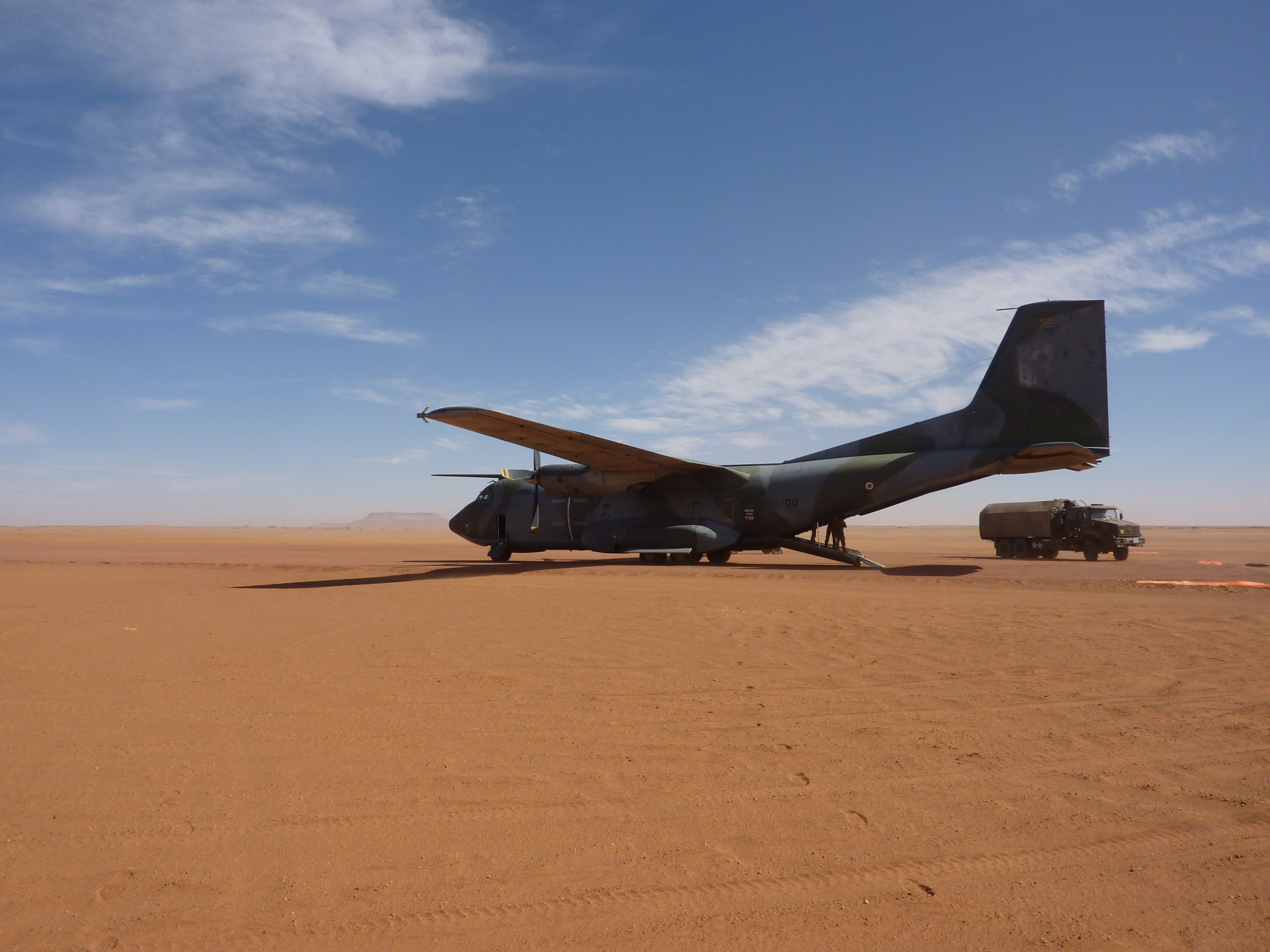
Transall C-160 military transport aircraft

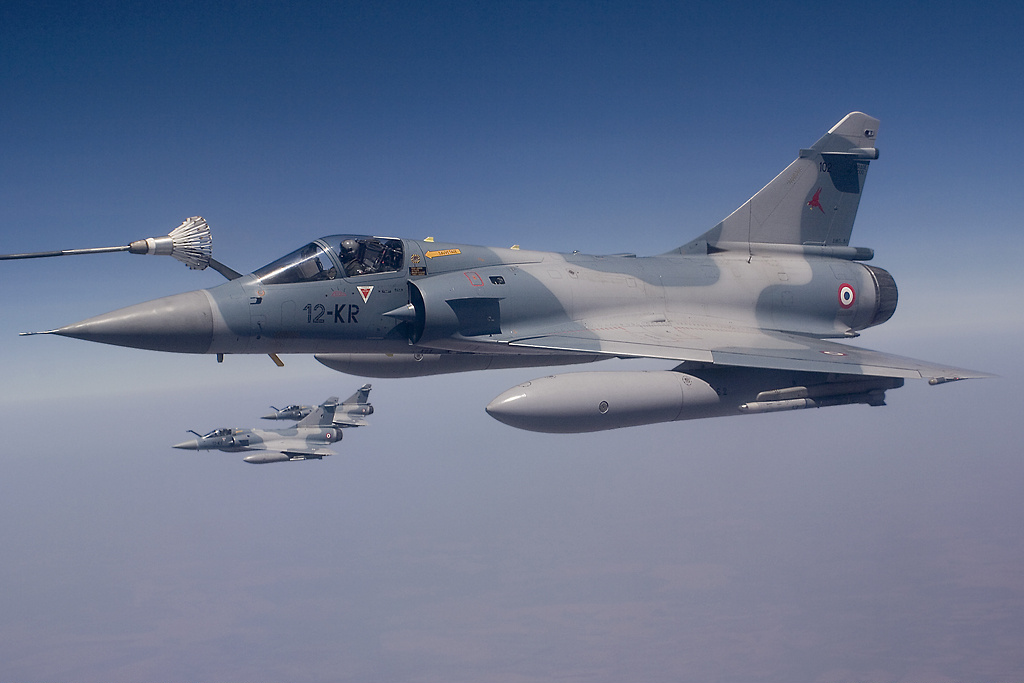
Mirage 2000-5 fighter aircraft

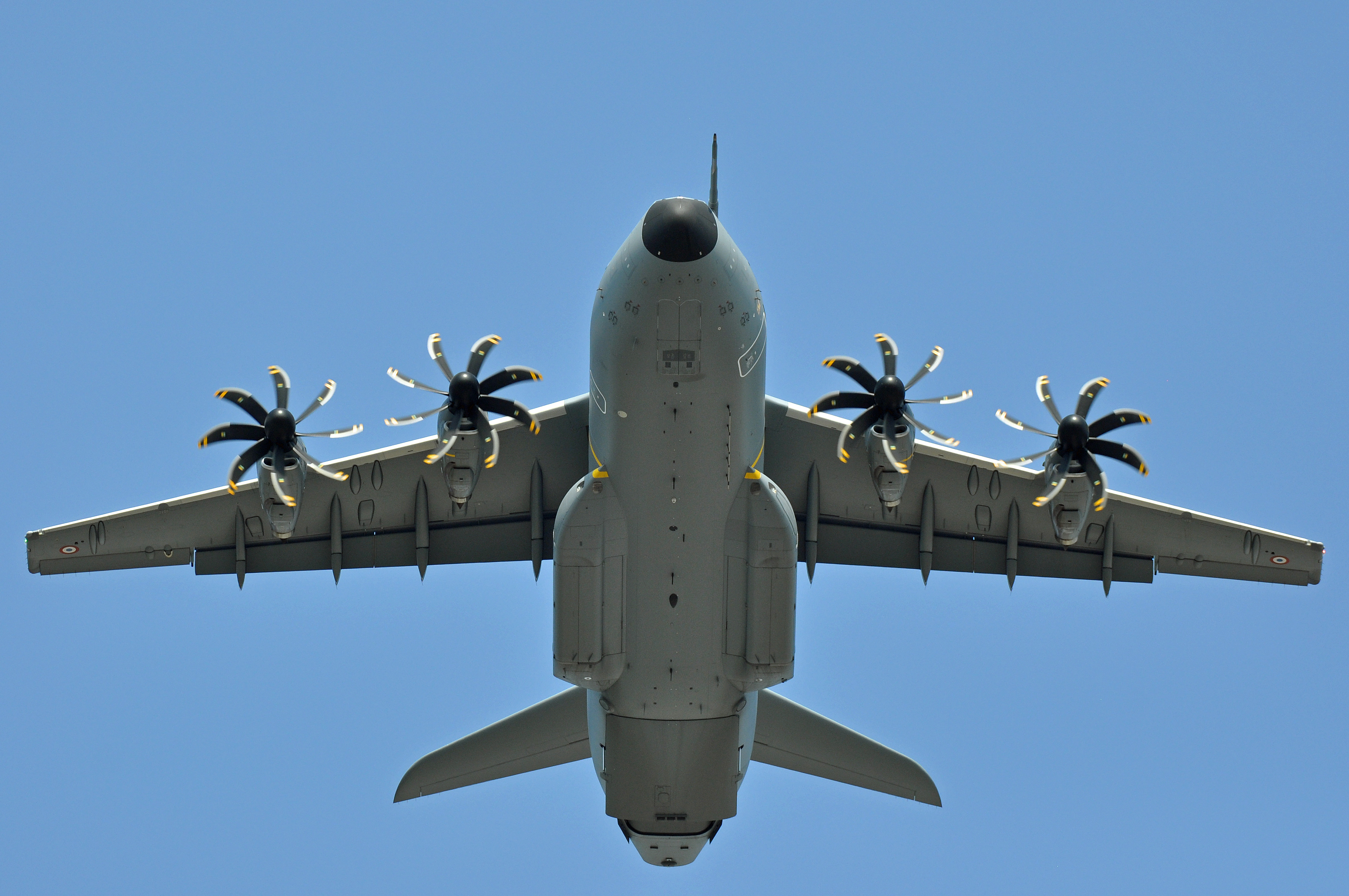
Airbus A400M Atlas tactical military transport aircraft

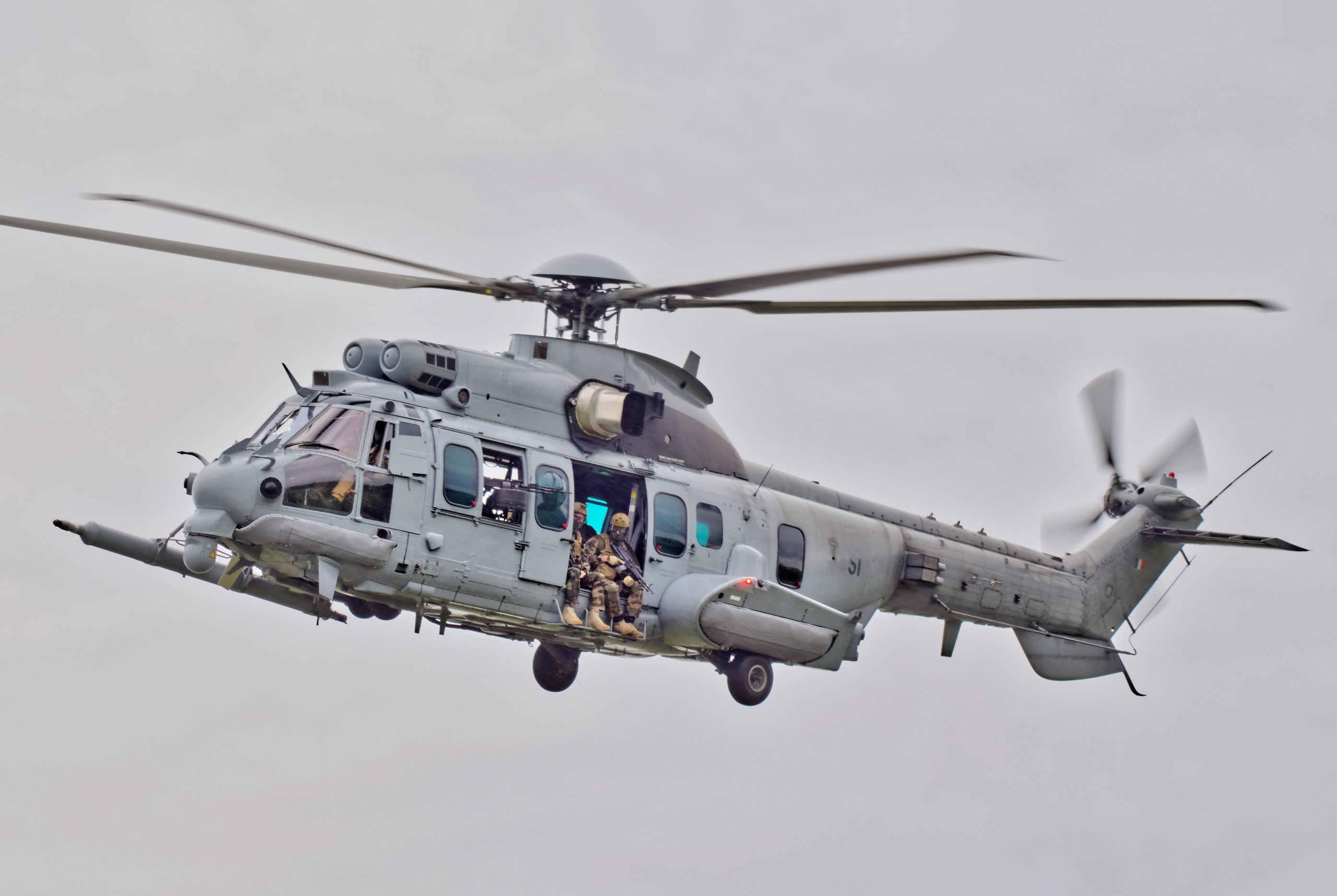
Eurocopter EC725, military transport helicopter

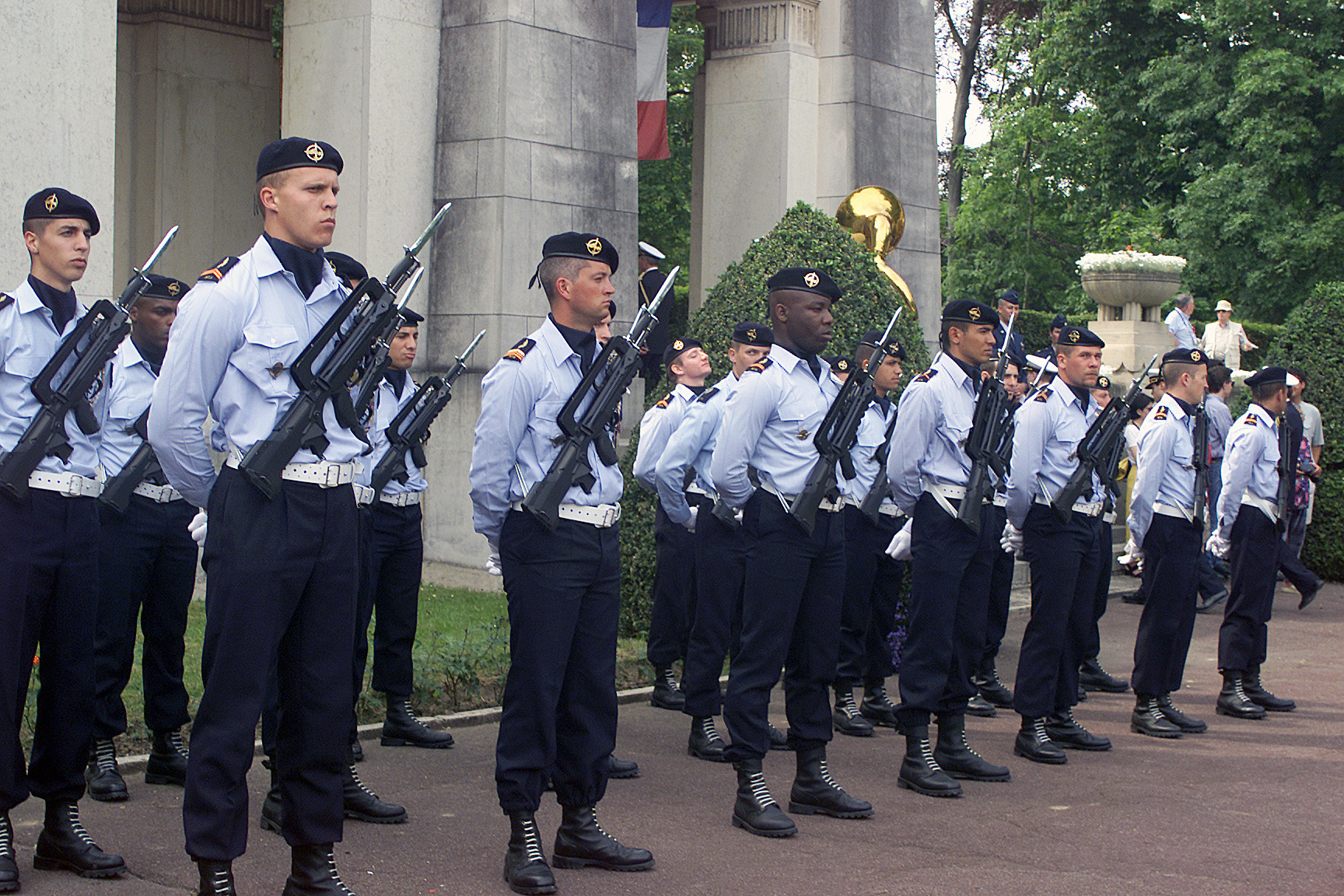
Parachute commandos of the French Air and Space Force

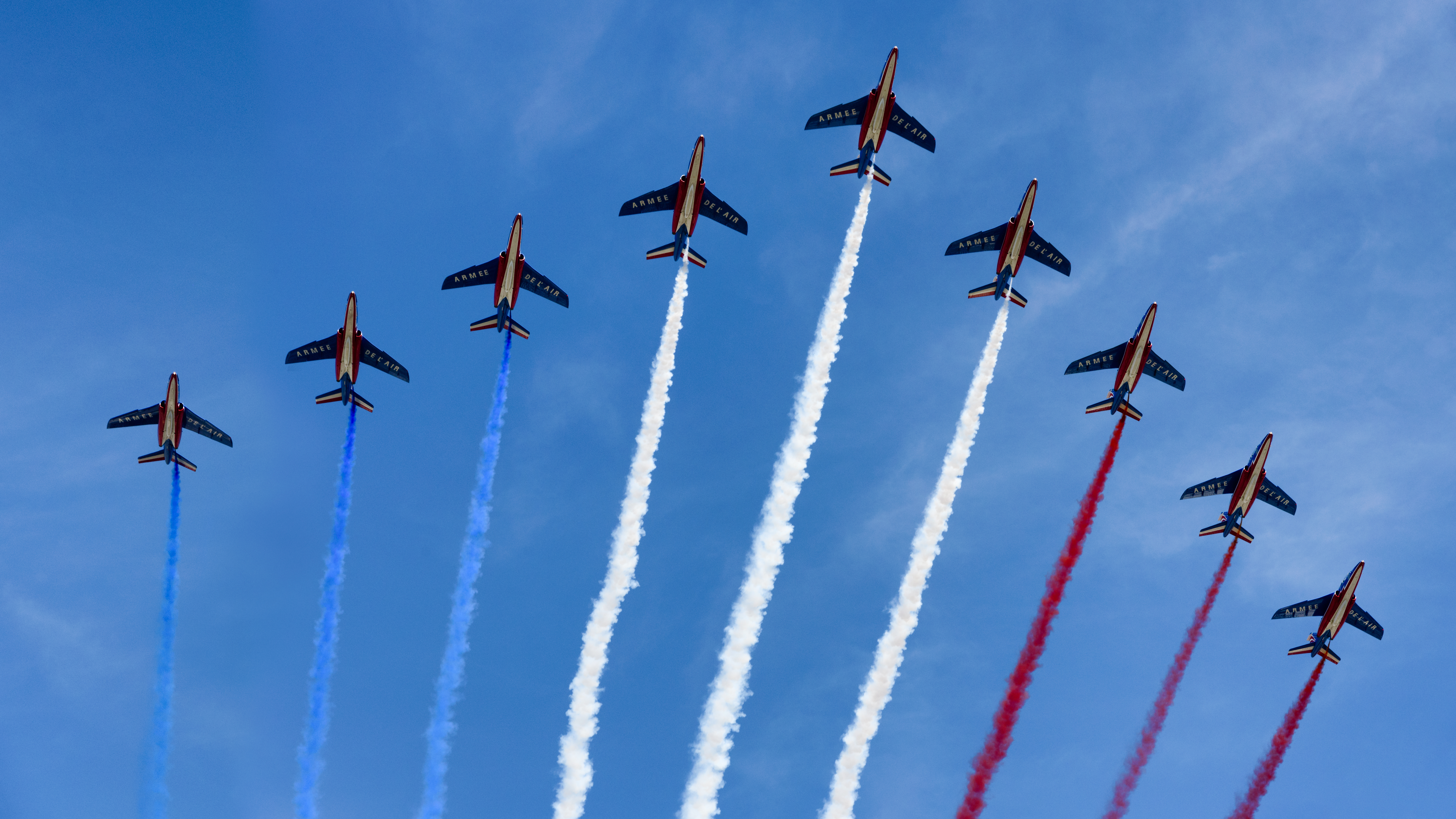
Formation flight of the Patrouille de France

=== National Gendarmerie (Gendarmerie nationale) ===
- Parachute Units of the National Gendarmerie
- Gendarmerie Départementale (GD) – territorial police force
- Gendarmerie Mobile (GM) – anti-riot unit and counter-terrorism group (GIGN)
- Garde républicaine – republican guard of France
- Gendarmerie des Transports Aériens – airport security force
- Gendarmerie de l'Air – used for Air and Space Force security
- Gendarmerie Maritime – coast guard unit
- Provost Gendarmerie – provides military police services to French Armed Forces personnel in deployments outside France
- Overseas Gendamerie – provides military police services in the French overseas dependencies and territories, as well as to embassies of France abroad

The National Gendarmerie is primarily a military and airborne capable police force which serves as a rural and general purpose police force.

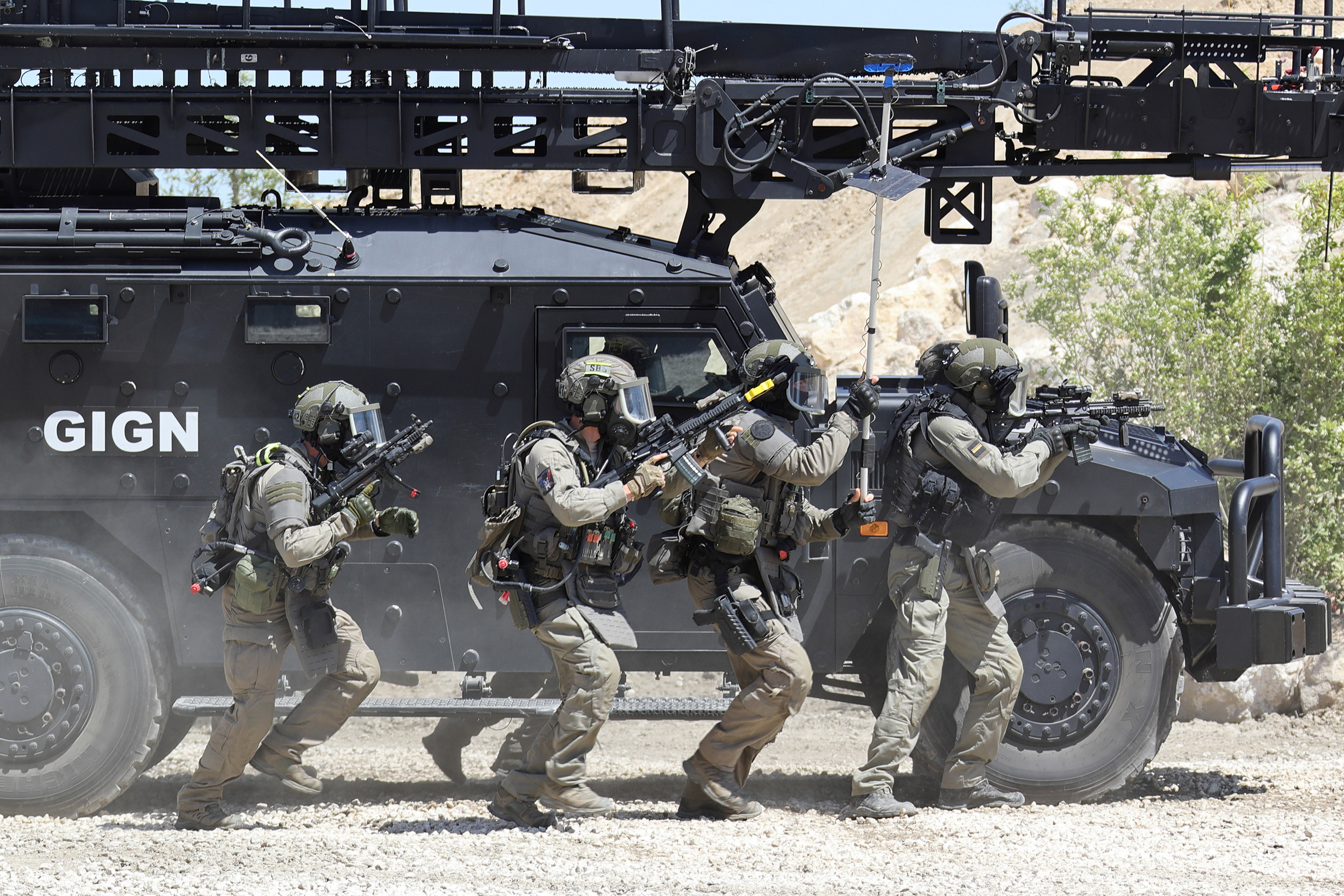
GIGN unit progressing in front of a Sherpa assault ladder vehicle during training

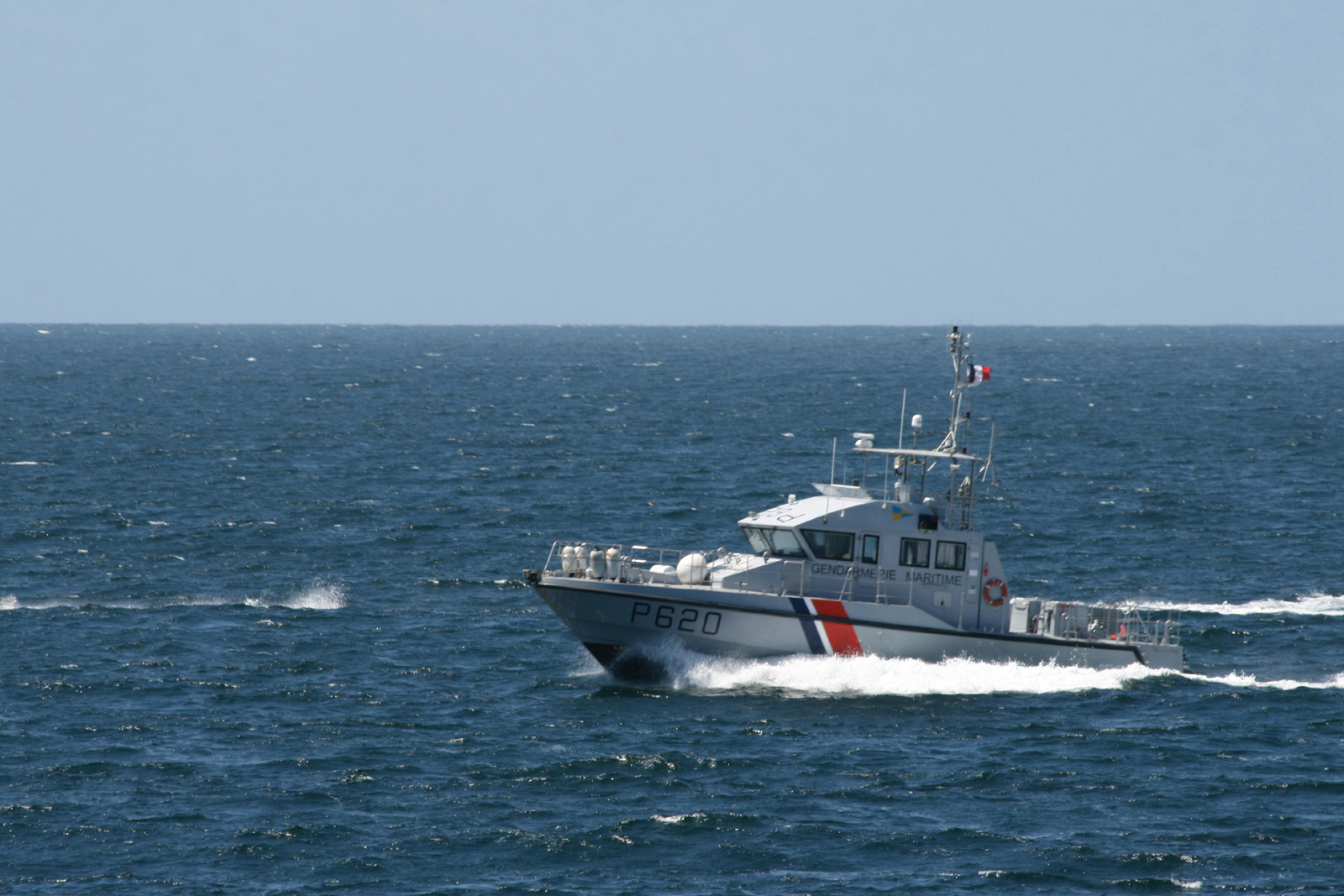
Sèvre (P620), coastal maritime surveillance patrol boat

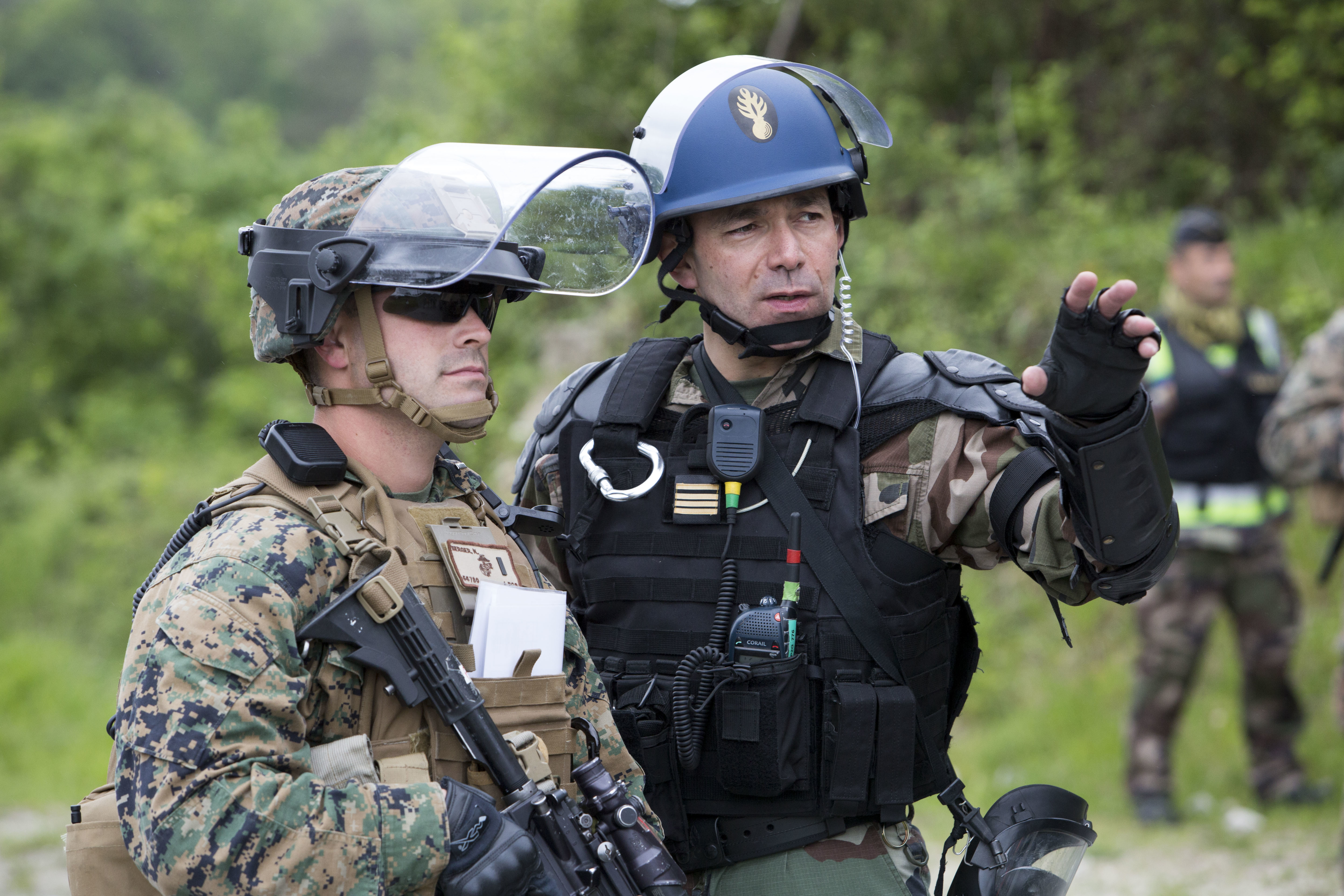
French gendarmes and U.S. Marines during a joint exercise

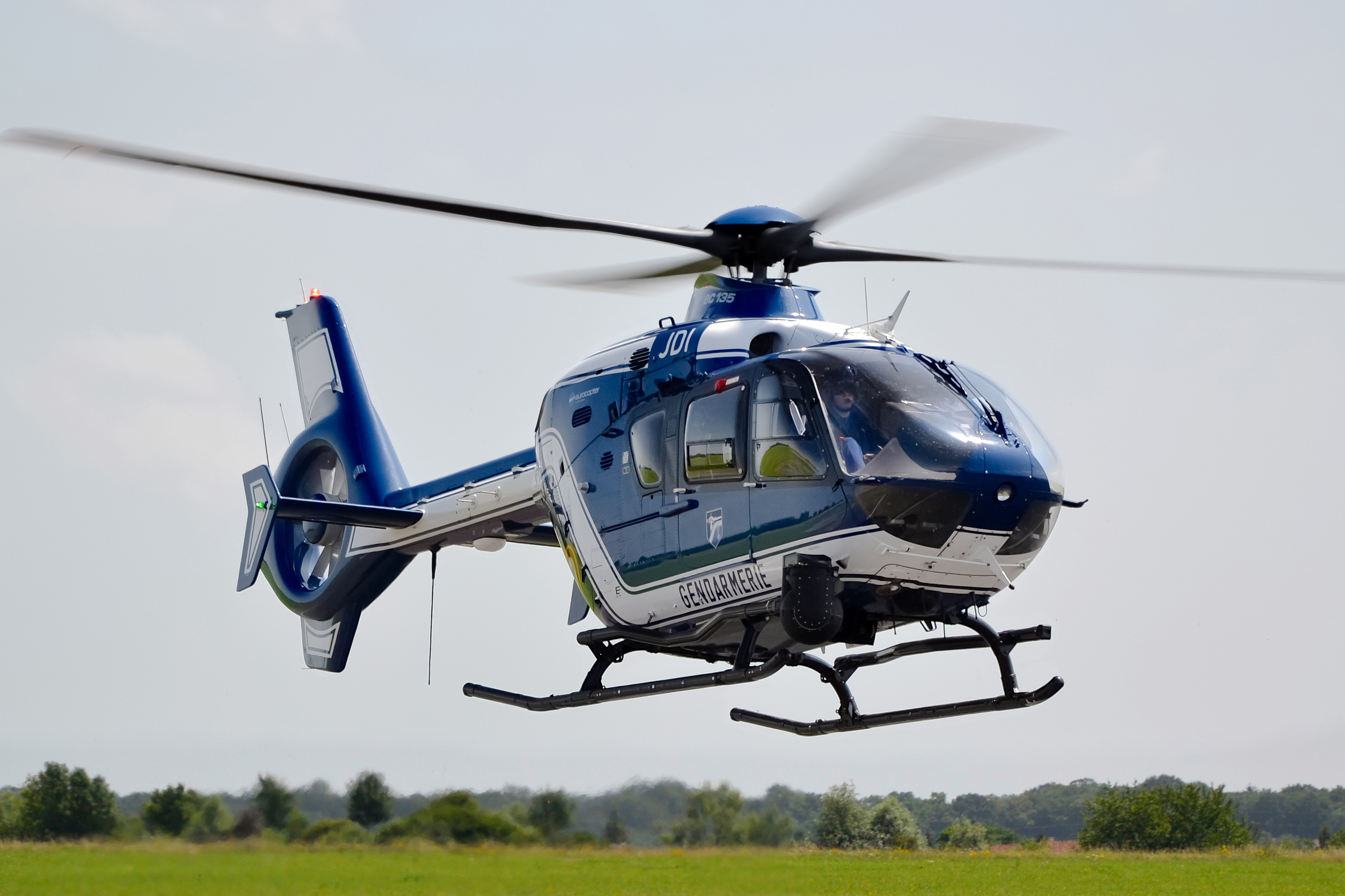
Eurocopter EC135 helicopter operated by the Gendarmerie’s air units

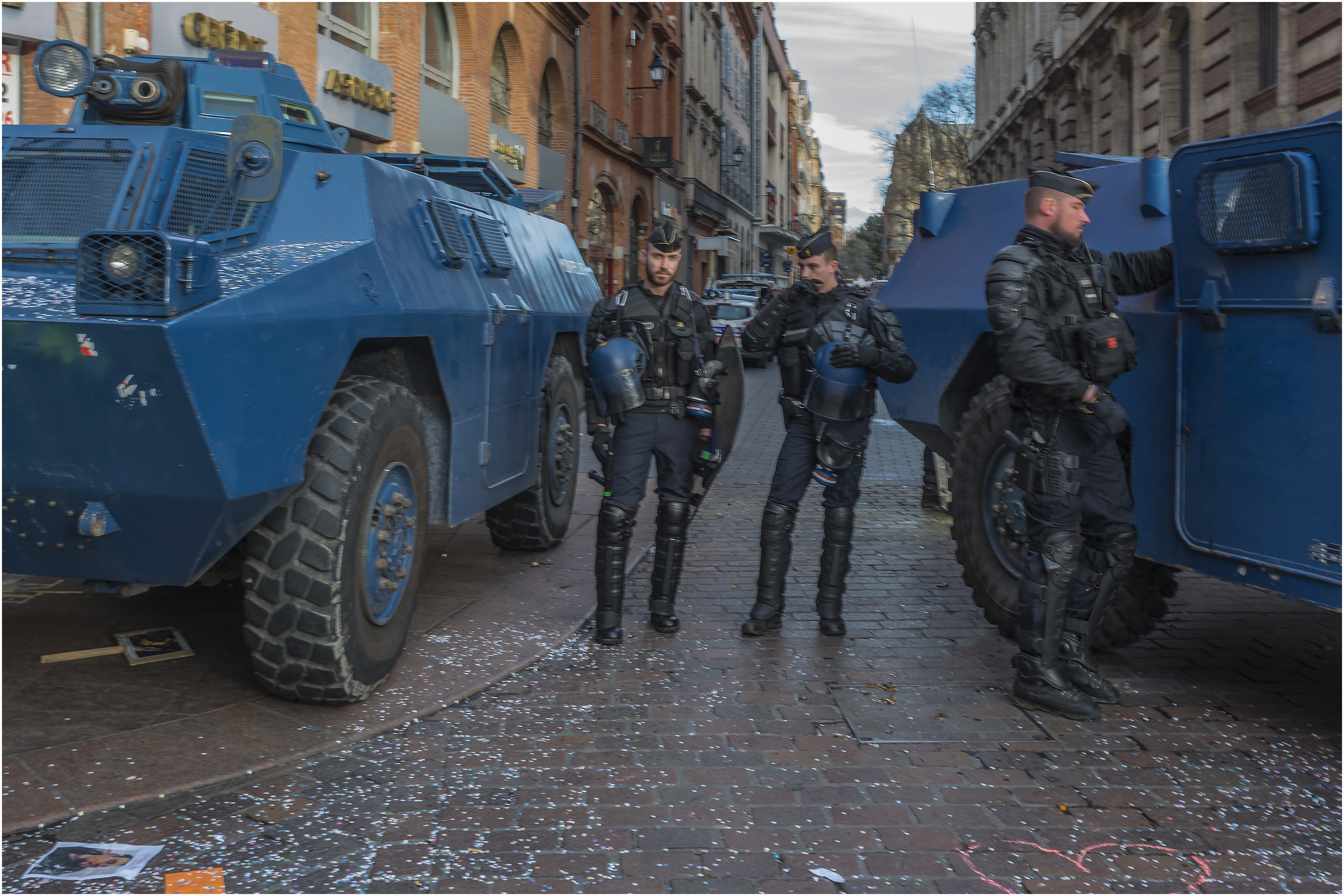
Berliet VXB-170 four-wheel armoured vehicle of the Mobile Gendarmerie

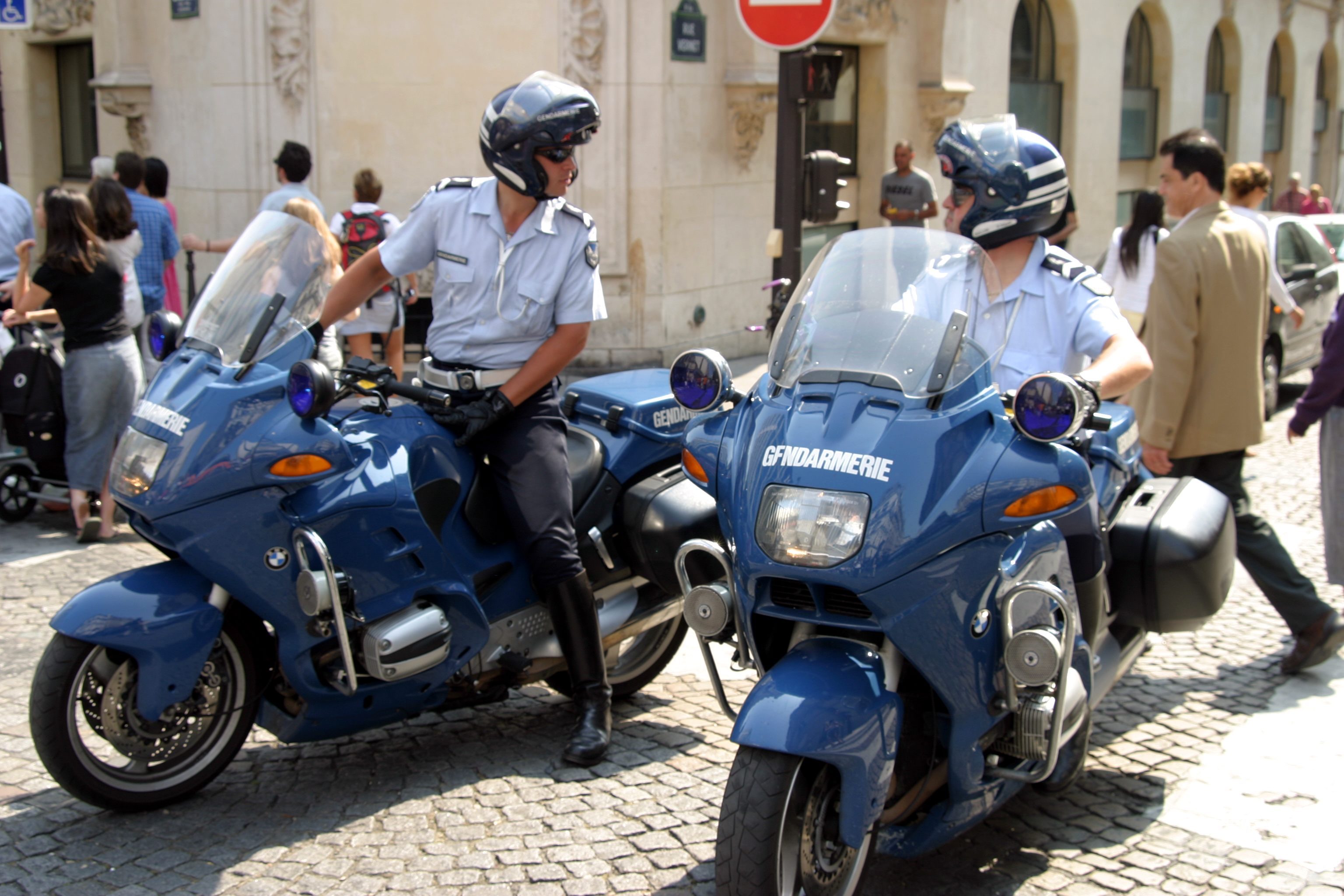
Gendarmes of a motorcycle brigade

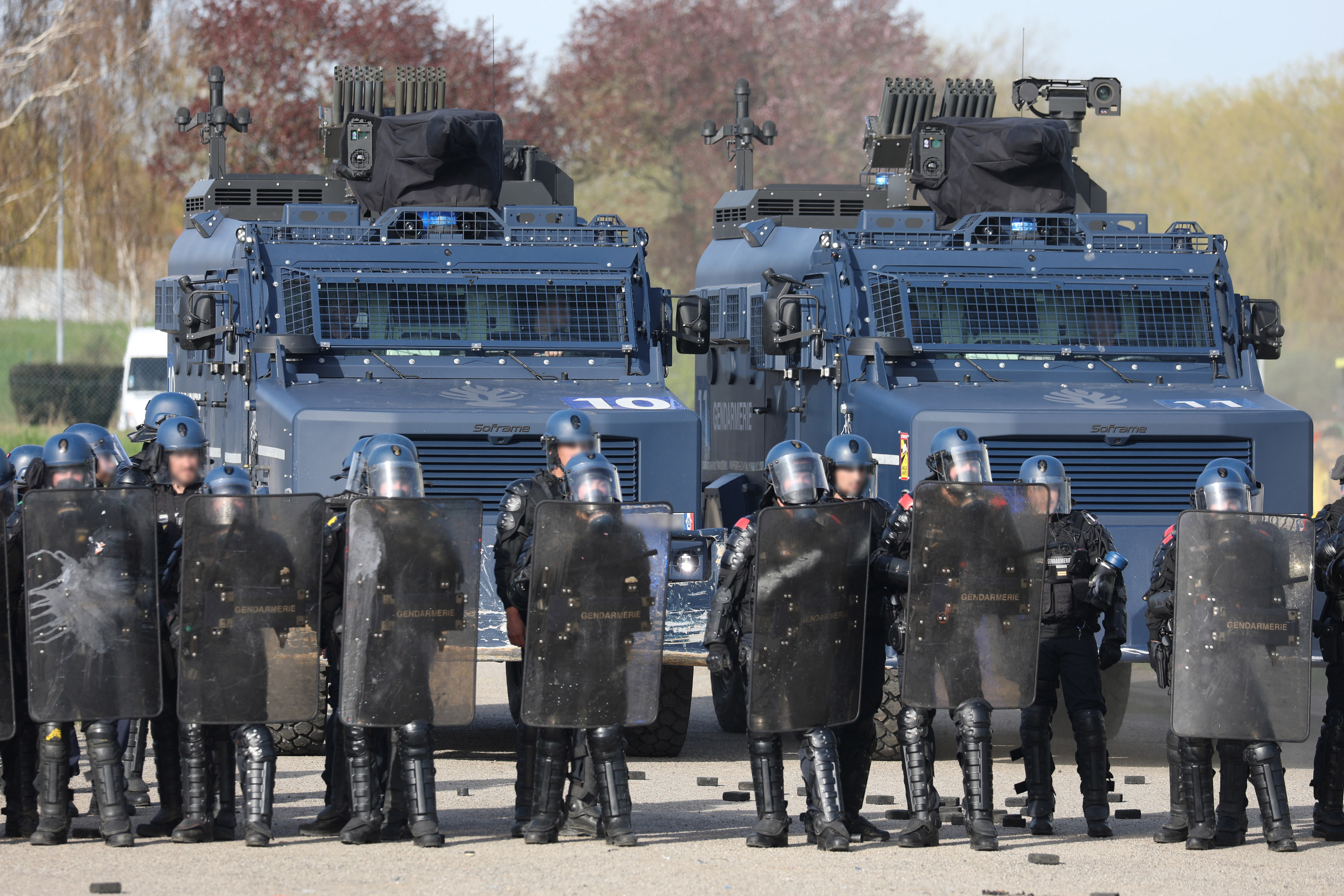
VIPG Centaure armored vehicle of the Mobile Gendarmerie during a demonstration

=== National Guard (Garde nationale) ===
Reactivated in 2014, the National Guard serves as the official primary military and police reserve service of the Armed Forces. It is placed under the jurisdiction of Ministry of the Armed Forces and serves as a reserve force. It also doubles as a force multiplier for law enforcement personnel during contingencies and to reinforce military personnel whenever being deployed within France and abroad.

== See also ==
- Bastille Day Military Parade
- Combined Joint Expeditionary Force (CJEF)
- Foreign Legion
- History of the French Navy from 1715 to 1789
- Lists of military equipment of France
- List of equipment of the French Army
- List of active military aircraft of the French Armed Forces
- Military history of France
- National Office for Veterans and Victims of War
- The Lancaster House Treaties (2010)
- Troupes de Marine
- Unmanned aerial vehicles in the French Armed Forces

== Bibliography ==
- International Institute for Strategic Studies. The Military Balance 2021. London: Routledge. ISBN 9781032012278.
