= Conscription in Germany =

Between 1956 and 2011, Germany conscripted men subject to mandatory military service (German: Wehrpflicht, German: [ˈveːɐ̯ˌp͡flɪçt]). After a proposal on 22 November 2010 by Karl-Theodor zu Guttenberg, the German Minister of Defence at the time, Germany put conscription into abeyance on 1 July 2011. While the German constitution retains the legal instruments for reintroducing conscription in Germany, currently only men over 18 years of age can be conscripted whilst women cannot under any circumstance (auf keinen Fall) be required to "serve with a weapon" (Dienst mit der Waffe). (Note: Women and LGBTQ+ people, just like men, are able to serve in the military, but unlike men during the constitutional states of tension and defence, only on a voluntary basis. To achieve proper and complete equality with men by being just as required to protect and defend the country as men are, a change to the constitution is necessary.)

The constitution (called Basic Law for the Federal Republic of Germany) and several special laws (e.g., Wehrpflichtgesetz) regulate these duties and exceptions. In the last year of active conscription, men were obliged to either (1) serve six months in the military, which they could refuse, or alternatively (2) complete an alternative civilian service of at least six months in hospitals, youth organisations, nursing homes, rescue services, emergency medical services, care of disabled people or a civil defence organisation. Families of those who were victims of or oppressed by the Nazi regime (predominantly Jews) were exempted from conscription, although some volunteered to serve.

== History ==
=== Military service for conscripts ===
Men who did not state that they were conscientious objectors and did not request civil service were by default conscripted into military service (Wehrdienst) in the Bundeswehr. Basic training (Allgemeine Grundausbildung) comprised three months of combat training, then three months' service at an assigned post. The conscript would normally reach the rank of Obergefreiter (NATO code OR-3, comparable to U.S. Army Private First Class). During his service, he received free health care, housing, food, and railway travel between his home and military base. Conscripts were paid between €9.41 and €10.95 per day of basic pay (depending on rank) plus several bonus payments such as distance-from-home pay, additional food pay for days absent from service.

=== Service in Civil Protection Services ===
Conscripts could also opt for a civilian substitute service, which was, by law, equal to military service, consisting mostly of medical ambulance organisations and organisations for disaster relief (Katastrophenschutz). This was subject to validation by local authorities, who usually were allowed a certain contingent of such volunteers per year of birth. Thus, organizations such as the Technical Relief Service (Technisches Hilfswerk, abbreviated to THW), volunteer fire services, and other emergency assistance and crisis management agencies such as the Red Cross were supported in performing their volunteer services in disaster response. In the ambulance services, their service could overlap with the service of conscientious objectors.

Conscripts that served in civil protection received no payment outside of compensations for clothing and transportation expenses, as they were performing an honorary service (ehrenamtlich).

=== Conscientious objection ===
The German constitution requires that conscientious objection be possible, and therefore conscripts were allowed to perform civilian alternative service (Zivildienst or Wehrersatzdienst). The conscientious objection had to be declared in a personal letter to the local branch (Kreiswehrersatzamt), with an appendix outlining one's moral objections. The branch then sent this appendix to the Federal Office for Civilian Service (Bundesamt für den Zivildienst) for approval or denial. From 1983, denial of conscientious objection claims was quite rare, but prior to 1983 the objector had to defend the validity of his claim before a committee at the draft office. These claims must have been directed against war and military service in general, without regard to the circumstances, and, if they were rejected (which was then a common outcome), the only legal recourse was to challenge the decision in administrative court. While the option of conscientious objection is required by law, in the past there were several hurdles in place to discourage it. Until 1983 conscientious objectors had to undergo a Gewissensprüfung (lit. 'conscience inspection'), an oral examination before a board that tried their motivations, which could decide to deny them conscientious objector status.

Those who objected had to perform civilian alternative service, lasting the same amount of time as military service, plus one additional month, during which they may have found employment with a civilian institution that renders a public service, such as a kindergarten, hospital, rehabilitation center or assisted living facility for the elderly. Alternative service could be more convenient than military service since the conscript could continue living at home rather than in military barracks.

Before German reunification in 1990, residents of West Berlin were exempt from conscription as West Berlin did not formally belong to the Federal Republic of Germany. Therefore some young men moved to West Berlin immediately upon their high school graduation in order to avoid conscription, and thus served neither in the military nor in an alternative service. A total of around 50,000 West German men evaded conscription by moving to West Berlin.

In East Germany, conscripts who were not willing to bear arms were drafted into the National People's Army as construction soldiers (Bausoldaten). They were deployed to public construction projects, and sometimes also to fill worker shortages in various parts of the East German economy, such as the mining industry. Men who served as Bausoldaten were frequently subjected to discrimination by the East German state, even after they had finished their service. For example, former Bausoldaten were often barred from enrolling at university.

=== Duration and payment ===
The German constitution also requires that the duration of civilian service does not exceed that of military service. Beginning in 2003, civilian service was of the same duration in months as military service. Until then there was a rate in hours both services had to serve, which was then divided by the average daily work hours in military and civil service. Thereby, civil service tended to be 1–3 months longer than military service, as the latter used to have 50 working hours a week (as opposed to 40 working hours in civil organisations). This made four "military weeks" equivalent to five "civil weeks". This practice was abolished when the conscription duration was reduced from 10/12 months to 9/9 and later 6/6 months.

=== Exemption from service ===
Women were not conscripted, but they could serve voluntarily. Since 1975 women have been allowed to serve in medical and music band functions. In 2001 the European Court of Justice ruled that limiting women to these functions was against European law. Subsequently, all positions in the Bundeswehr were opened up to women but without also changing the constitution that would have made all genders equal in this regard.

Under a deal between the German Defense Ministry and the Central Council of Jews in Germany, Jews descending from Holocaust victims (up to the third generation) were exempted from military service obligations, but could still volunteer for military service. For decades, volunteering for military service was taboo in the German-Jewish community, but eventually, Jews began joining. In 2007, there were an estimated 200 Jewish soldiers serving in the Bundeswehr.

Men could be exempted from conscription for various reasons. The most frequent reason was medical exemption (Ausmusterung). All conscripts, including conscientious objectors but excluding those exempt for other reasons, had to attend a medical examination (Musterung) at the local conscription branch (Kreiswehrersatzamt). Those who did not pass were exempted from conscription, both military and civilian.

Anyone sentenced to more than a year of imprisonment, or who was charged with a felony against peace, democracy, the state, or state security was not conscripted. Priests were also not drafted, and another provision released everyone from military service who had two siblings who had already served. The same was true for men whose fathers, mothers, or siblings died in military or civil service. Men who were married, living in a registered civil union, or had children were also free to choose. In addition, anyone employed in areas of significant public interest could be exempted from military service upon request. This mostly applied to policemen, career firemen, and specialists in telecommunication and engineering services.

=== Alternative services to Zivildienst ===
Another alternative was to become a foreign Entwicklungshelfer (lit. 'development helper'), which means that the person would be expected to work in a technical capacity in a recognized developing country for a period of not less than two years. To qualify for this option, the candidate had to meet the requests of the chosen agency which included formal vocational training or an educational program that granted a recognized qualification in a marketable skill making him a useful asset in a developing host country. Many men who chose this option became so engaged in the developmental needs of these countries that they stayed abroad many years longer than the legal requirement. The disproportionately high percentage of German nationals found in many international aid, conservation, medical and technical assistance organizations active in developing countries may be directly attributable to this.

Women and unconscripted men were able to opt into serving one year of voluntary service in a social or environmental institution, called Freiwilliges Soziales Jahr (FSJ) and Freiwilliges Ökologisches Jahr (FÖJ), respectively. It was not a real alternative to military service, but for most practical purposes identical to the civilian alternative service that conscientious objectors were required to serve. This included social security coverage for the term of service and might have given the young attendee a direction for their later career as well as a certain improvement in soft skills.

=== Total resisters (Totalverweigerung) ===
If a conscripted man refused to serve in the military and refused alternative service, he was subject to legal prosecution and imprisonment. (Note: In 2007, a 20-year-old man was arrested by the Bundeswehr for being AWOL (Absent Without Official Leave).) The sentence was dependent upon the way he refused to serve. In the military it was prosecuted under military law as desertion (Fahnenflucht) and insubordination (Gehorsamsverweigerung), whereas in the civilian alternative service it was AWOL (Dienstflucht). It was never a court-martial. The accused man was often prosecuted under juvenile law and in theory could be fined or imprisoned for up to five years. In practice, the most frequent punishment was three months imprisonment, as longer first-time sentences would be recorded in his Polizeiliches Führungszeugnis (certificate of conduct).

== Political debate to suspend conscription ==
The post-Cold-War downsizing of the Bundeswehr led to a considerable decrease in demand for young conscripts. Of all men reaching conscription age, less than one half actually served. In 2005, about 15% served in the military whilst 31% performed civilian service or some other form of alternative service. More than 36% were screened out for medical reasons. This percentage was lower in the past (15% in 2003), but to avoid conscripting more men than needed, medical standards were raised. The remainder included those that were exempted for various reasons, but was mostly made up of men who were not conscripted because the military had already met its recruitment goals. This led to discussions about "conscription equality" (Wehrgerechtigkeit) – the principle that conscription be applied equally and non-discriminatorily to all men. The issue of Wehrgerechtigkeit was one aspect of the political debate over whether the Bundeswehr should be converted into a purely volunteer-based, professional army.

=== Historical arguments ===
Proponents of conscription reason that it conserved the military's firm rooting in civilian society and warn that a professional army might return to the militaristic, anti-democratic and elitist traditions of the Nazi and German Empire eras – despite the fact that those regimes also practiced conscription. Conscription is sometimes defended as a tradition dating back to the 1848 revolution, intended to ensure the continuity of the democratic state.

=== Military arguments ===
Military detractors of conscription reasoned that shortening the service to six months, which was necessary to accommodate a constant number of conscripts in a shrinking army, had made conscription worthless because conscripts receive too little training. Military proponents countered that some service is better than none at all, bringing male citizens in contact with their military and thereby countering fears of an increasing disconnect between military and male society.

Another factor was the armed forces' difficulty to find volunteers for senior positions beyond the conscript level. Many soldiers in advanced ranks were recruited from former conscripts who volunteer to extend their service. Abolishing conscription could close this pathway into the military. Therefore, military leaders feared that the abolition of conscription would lead to recruitment shortages for higher ranking positions as well.

=== Financial arguments ===
Some detractors of conscription expected considerable savings in defence spending from abolishing conscription, because it would allow a downsizing of the armed forces, which owe much of their current size to the need to accommodate large numbers of conscripts. It was arguable how such a reduction in size would affect the Bundeswehr's capabilities. Those in favour of a downsizing claimed that it would not affect the ability to act in conflict theatres, since conscripts at the time could not be involuntarily deployed to such theatres, which were therefore the domain of a quasi-professional army only anyway.

Experiences of countries who have abolished conscription, especially the United States and France, show that professional armed forces can be more expensive than a conscription-based military. Professional armies need to pay their soldiers higher wages, and have large advertising expenses to attract sufficient numbers of able recruits. The difficulties in recruiting soldiers for advanced ranks without conscription, as well as difficulties in retaining such higher-ranking soldiers whose term of service time ends, indicates that a professional army might have to make considerable financial efforts to be competitive as an employer.

=== Civic arguments ===
Civilian detractors argued that conscription was simply anachronistic, instilling an undue sense of militarism in young men, and also delaying their entry into the workforce. Others argued that especially young people often detached themselves from their community, consuming its benefits but trying to avoid its duties. Conscription obliged at least the male portion of the population to pay society back through military and civilian service.

Furthermore, abolishing conscription also meant abolishing civilian service. A purely civilian compulsory service would be incompatible with the German basic law, which permitted conscription only for the purpose of defense. This caused a considerable drop in the number of people working in the care of children and elderly people. Such care facilities often relied on civilian service to furnish them with large numbers of very low-paid workers.

Apart from that, professional forces tend to recruit largely from underprivileged groups in society. In 2007 for example, a disproportionate number of soldiers (about 4 out of 10) who volunteer beyond their basic service came from the poorer eastern parts of Germany. It was feared that a professional force would increase this trend, disconnecting the armed forces from the more affluent groups in society.

== Political process to re-establish a mandatory military service ==
Due to the Russian invasion of Ukraine, European governments are striving to strengthen their military forces. To increase the number of active soldiers in the Bundeswehr, several measures have been discussed. In 2024 the idea was for German male citizens that have reached the age of 18 to complete a mandatory questionnaire. Questionnaire recipients were to provide information about their motivation for military service. 40,000 men would then be compelled to attend a muster. However, this was never implemented and has now been abandoned.

== New military service and demand-based conscription ==
In November 2025, the Merz cabinet agreed to reintroduce mandatory registration and mandatory health examination (Musterung) for all candidate male (Note: The determining factor is legal gender, and thus includes transgender individuals who have transitioned to the male gender.) citizens in Germany; citizens of other genders are not considered equal to males in this regard at this time. The corresponding law came into force on 1 January 2026, with mandatory Musterung for men born in 2008 beginning on 1 January 2027. From this date forward, candidate male citizens will be required to undergo mandatory registration and health examination. Despite the designation as Neuer Wehrdienst (lit. 'new military service'), this does not at this time directly constitute an obligation to perform military service. However, the law stipulates a target growth rate for the Bundeswehr by 2035, although the actual measures to be taken should these targets not be met – which is generally accepted as the expected outcome – are left to future legislation. One possible measure under consideration, called Bedarfswehrpflicht (lit. 'demand-based conscription'), comprises a random selection process (such as a lottery system) of candidate men for obligatory military service to reach target troop strength.

The new law also requires "all men under 45" that want "to leave [Germany ...] for longer than three months" to get prior "approval from the Bundeswehr" whilst also obligating "the military career centre to issue it." Until 2025, this requirement applied only while "Germany was in a state of national defence or mobilisation." The requirement also applies to dual-citizens, but not to "men who already live permanently abroad and have established their livelihood outside Germany". When the law was approved by parliament, many young people joined protests against the change. "We don't want to spend half a year of our lives locked up in barracks, being trained in drill and obedience and learning to kill," one organizer wrote on social media, reflecting broader youth opposition to the reintroduction of military obligations.

On 7 April 2026, Defence Minister Boris Pistorius suspended the travel-notification requirement by directive, while the underlying statutory authority remained in force.

== Further mandatory services ==
In Germany, beside the suspended military service, a few other mandatory services are possible and implemented by law in some municipalities, states and nationwide.

=== Border Guard Service ===
By constitutional law a Compulsory Border Guard Service in the Federal Police (Bundespolizei), the renamed Federal Border Guard (Bundesgrenzschutz) can be implemented. Currently conscription is suspended in peacetime, similar to conscription for military service.

=== Compulsory Fire Service ===
A Compulsory Fire Service for a local fire department is in force in a handful of municipalities.

=== Dyke Relief Service ===
In cases of flooding or crevasse, a dyke relief service (Deichhilfe) may be enforced where citizens can be drafted by municipalities for cleanup services or to make dykes safe.

=== Hand and hitch-up services ===
So-called hand and hitch-up services (Hand- und Spanndienste) or more contemporary the (mandatory) municipal services (Gemeindedienste) is an obligatory service, that can be requested by a local government and is still enforced in small townships to maintain municipal properties and infrastructure.

== See also ==
- Pacifism in Germany
- NATO
- Two Plus Four Agreement

== Sources ==
- Abbas, Ahmad (4 April 2026). "Germany's Overlooked Exit Rule: Men Aged 17 to 45 Now Need Bundeswehr Permission to Leave". Investment Migration Insider.
- Die Bundesregierung (5 December 2025). "Der Neue Wehrdienst" [The New Military Service]. Federal Government of Germany (in German). Presse- und Informationsamt der Bundesregierung.
- Großwald (12 June 2026) [2026-04-04]. "Germany Quietly Reactivates §3 Wehrpflichtgesetz Travel-Approval Authority over Male Nationals 17–45". Großwald. Berlin.
- Mazumdaru, Srinivas (4 April 2026). "German Men Need Military Permit for Extended Stays Abroad". Deutsche Welle.
- NDR Info (19 December 2025). "Neues Wehrdienstgesetz - Fragen und Antworten" [New Military Service Law - Questions and Answers]. Norddeutscher Rundfunk (in German).
- Rawnsley, Jessica (4 April 2026). "German Males Under 45 May Need Military Approval for Long Stays Abroad". BBC.
