= German Emergency Acts =

1968 West German laws

Final public Debate in german Parliament, vize chancellor Willy Brandt speaking (May 30th, 1968)

The German Emergency Acts (Notstandsgesetze) were passed on 30 May 1968 at the time of the First Grand Coalition between the Social Democratic Party of Germany and the Christian Democratic Union of Germany. It was the 17th constitutional amendment to the Basic Law, adding emergency clauses to ensure the federal government's ability to act in crises such as natural disasters, uprisings or war.

The inclusion of emergency laws in the German Basic Law was one condition imposed by the Allies before they would transfer full sovereignty to the Federal Republic of Germany after the Second World War. This was in order to ensure the safety of their troops still stationed in Germany.

On 27 May 1968 the Allied Control Council declared that they would give up their right of control (Vorbehaltsrecht) if the Emergency Acts were passed. On 30 May, when the law was voted on, the FDP was the only party to stand firm against their introduction. Of the Grand Coalition, 54 members also voted against them. The laws came into effect on 28 June 1968, marking the end of the special powers the Allied forces had been given over Germany in the Statute of Occupation of 21 September 1949.

The passing of the Emergency Acts was preceded by fierce domestic political debates, which contributed to the establishment of the APO ("Außerparlamentarische Opposition", lit. 'Extraparliamentary Opposition'). The critics of the Emergency Acts referred to the catastrophic effects of the emergency decrees of the Weimar Republic (Article 48 of the Weimar Constitution), which gave the President of the Reich extensive powers in the event of an unspecified emergency.

== Contents ==
Basic rights up to Artikel 13 in the root text (May, 23th 1949)

The Emergency Acts regulate the state of emergency, the state of defence, the state of tension and disaster events. A state of emergency can come into effect when an external threat impedes a normal democratic decision-making process. The Joint Committee then assumes essential parliamentary functions.

The emergency clauses include regulations in the Basic Law regarding:

- Article 10 (Restriction of the fundamental rights of the secrecy of letters, post and telecommunications)
- Article 11 (Restriction of the fundamental right to freedom of movement)
- Article 12a (Conscription, alternative service, compulsory service for defense purposes, including the protection of the civilian population in a state of defence)
- Article 20 paragraph 4 (Right of resistance)
- Article 53a (Emergency legislation by the Joint Committee)
- Article 81 (Legislative emergency)
- Article 115 (State of defence)

== See also ==
- German student movement
- History of Germany
- Politics of Germany
