= Federal Volunteers Service =

German government program

The Federal Volunteers Service (German: Bundesfreiwilligendienst) is a German government program which encourages volunteerism among German and foreign adults of any age for public welfare, especially for social, ecological and cultural engagement. Every person who has finished school can apply for a volunteer position in a welfare institution accredited by the federal government. The main difference between the old-established juvenile volunteer services voluntary social year or the voluntary ecological year, which are open for persons until the age of 27, is the possibility of people of any age to volunteer.

== Brief history of volunteering in Germany ==
In West Germany, Liselotte Funcke advocated in the 1960s a voluntary social year for young women Already in the 1950s there were as State mass initiative in East Germany for National integration, which took care of the removal of the rubble of World War II. In the 1960s this was the initiative of the "Mach mit Bewegung" ("participate movement").

The starting end of the 1990s by recurring debate on a possible abolition of conscription and the high demand for places in the youth volunteer services led the Federal Ministry for Family Affairs (BMFSFJ), in 2003, a commission of experts "for the future of civil society" convened. Representatives of social and environmental organizations and the relevant ministries drafted a final report, that suggested, among other things, the promotion of inter-generational volunteer services. Two corresponding model projects started from 2004 but included only projects with weekly working hours to a maximum of 20 hours, so not up to the full-time use in the youth volunteer services. From 2009 to the end of 2011 a follow-up project "Voluntary Service all generations" offered only a part-time (8 hours per week) engagement.

In summer 2010 Defence Minister Karl-Theodor zu Guttenberg enforced the suspension of conscription in Germany. The BMFSFJ instantly drafted a bill for the Bundesfreiwilligendienst in the departmental co-ordination. The Zivildienst, the mandatory alternative service for conscientious objectors had to be suspended as well, if the draft for military service in the German armed forces "Bundeswehr" is suspended. About 80,000 - 130,000 Zividienst-draftees per year served in the years 2000 - 2010 in healthcare facilities and retirement homes, which would be missing after the suspension of conscription. With effect of 28 April 2011 and a relatively short legislative procedure the' 'Law on the Federal Voluntary Service (BFDG Federal Voluntary Service Act)' entered into force. After initial reluctance, the service is now regarded as a success, due to the fact that in the first five years more than 216,000 persons became a "Bufdi" or "BFDler/BFDlerin" (for Bundesfreiwilligendienstleistende, German for Federal Volunteer), how the volunteers serving the BFD are called. Several associations and support stand for a further expansion of the service, after almost all the seats were awarded in 2012.

== Statutory rule ==
Everybody, and not only German citizens, is allowed to become volunteer of the Federal Volunteers Service after finishing the minimum school age. There is no upper age limit. The service has to be fulfilled like full employees in 40 working hours per week. The minimum length of service is 12 months, with some exceptions. Volunteers over the age of 27 are allowed to serve again after five years. For the service period the volunteer has to pay full social insurance like a normal employee.

== Funding ==
Depending on the institution the volunteers are working the federal government pays a part or all costs, especially for social insurance. The volunteer only gets pocket money.

== Tasks of the BFD ==
- The service is the commitment to the 'common good' in social, environmental and cultural fields as well as in sports and - promote the civil protection and the integration - new in relation to the youth volunteer services. It also serves to lifelong learning.
- Potential volunteers are all individuals after completion of the minimum school age and without limitation upwards.
- The work is done in full-time; for volunteers over 27 years there is also a reduction of more than 20 hours possible.
- The service time is generally 12 months, in special undertakings between 6 and 24 months; a denomination in 3-month blocks is possible in special cases.
- Adults over 27 years of age may every five years again become federal volunteer.
- Accommodation, food, clothes and pocket money should be paid similarly to the youth volunteer services.
- Operating units can become non-profit institutions of the social and environmental field.
- Seminars must be visited in analogy to the youth volunteer services of 25 days per year, regardless of the working week. At 12 months deviating service a seminar is a month more or less mandatory (§ 4 Abs. 3). A seminar week must serve the political education and should "be carried out usually in the existing state civil service schools".
- Educational support of all volunteers is provided.
- The social insurance correspond to those in the youth volunteer services, therefore the volunteers are insured as workers. There is (regardless of the amount of paid pocket money) compulsory insurance under the statutory social law.
- All operating units have to be recognized by the Federal Government, where all previously recognized community service agencies are automatically considered approved. New bodies are recognized by the Federal Government or by one of FSJ / FÖJ carrier with the consent of the respective state.
- The working arrangement is closed to the joint proposal of operation sites and volunteers between the Federal Government and the volunteer. This is therefore a bilateral employment relationship, but that is no employment relationship, in which the carrier not a party, but the contractor is the federal government.
- All federal volunteers choose once a year seven speakers and seven alternates who will represent the interests of young volunteers, especially against the BAfzA and the BMFSFJ.
- To issue a qualified certificate for each volunteer is duty of the operating units.

== Number of federal volunteers ==
Already in 2011 the year of the establishment of the BFD, more volunteers joined the service than positions were available. An overview of the number of volunteers:

Number of BFD-volunteers
Year	volunteers	year	volunteers
2011	Foundation of BFD	2021	37,404
2012	34,345	2022	36,255
2013	40,327	2023	34,966
2014	42,733	2024	35,251
2015	37,408	2025	33,240
2016	41,168	2026	-
2017	41,912	2027	-
2018	41,190	2028	-
2019	39,196	2029	-
2020	38,218	2030	-

Although there are two popular volunteer services provided by the FSJ and the FÖJ for adults up to 27, by far most volunteers at the BFD are up to the age of 26. In general there are more female than male volunteers (as of May 2025).

Age groups and percentage of genders BFD volunteers
Age groups	female	male	nonbinary / third gender	not specified	in total
up to the age of 26	47.14 %	29.15 %	0.28 %	0.10 %	76.66 %
between the age of 27 and 65	11.98 %	9.55 %	0.03 %	0.02 %	21.59 %
the age of 66 and older	0.85 %	0.89 %	0.01 %	0.00 %	1.75 %
all age groups	59.98 %	39.59 %	0.32 %	0.12 %	100.00 %

The most BFD volunteers (as of 2025) are active in following states:

Volunteers by state
State	number of volunteers	percentage	state	number of volunteers	percentage
North Rhine-Westphalia	7,042	21.19 %	Schleswig-Holstein	1,212	3.65 %
Baden-Württemberg	5,651	17.00 %	Thuringia	1,153	3.47 %
Lower Saxony	4,040	12.15 %	Mecklenburg-Vorpommern	1,115	3.35 %
Bavaria	3,027	9.11 %	Brandenburg	1,090	3.28 %
Saxony	2,647	7.96 %	Rhineland-Palatinate	845	2.54 %
Saxony-Anhalt	1,502	4.52 %	Hamburg	813	2.45 %
Berlin	1,294	3.89 %	Bremen	374	1.13 %
Hesse	1,220	3.67 %	Saarland	215	0.65 %

== See also ==
- Volunteering
- Voluntary social year
- Voluntary ecological year
