= Zivildienst in Austria =

Civilian service in Austria

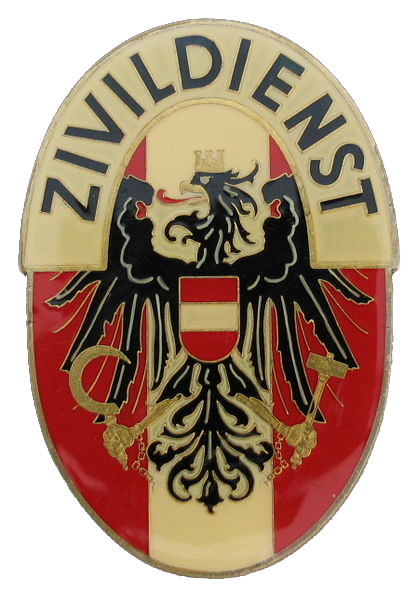
Badge of Zivildienst (Austria, 1982)

The Zivildienst (German, translated verbatim to "Civilian Service", but "compulsory paid community service" is more contextually equivalent) is the mandatory alternative service (Wehrersatzdienst) for conscientious objectors of the national military service in the Austrian Armed Forces. Officially called Zivildienstleistender (ZDL) or Zivildiener it is common to call them Zivi.

Since 1975, drafted men may refuse the military service on conscientious reasons and serve in the compulsory alternative community service instead. This generally involves work in social services like hospitals, youth organisations, nursing homes, rescue services, emergency medical services, and care of the disabled. The service usually lasts nine months. About more than 40% of the drafted male citizens in Austria choose this option by declaring a conflict of conscience.

There is no conscription for women, therefore women are not obliged to serve as Zivildiener, substituting for the still extant draft. Austrian women do, however, volunteer for the FSJ filling gaps.

== History ==
In 1955, when conscription was introduced in Austria again, an alternative civilian service for conscientious objectors was not provided. Similar to the so-called construction soldiers in East Germany, a regular military service without a weapon (German: ordentlicher Präsenzdienst ohne Waffe) could be performed on request. The duration of this special service took three months longer than the regular military service. Between 1956 and 1974 only 3,277 applications were made for regular military service without a weapon, of which 3,266 were approved.

The compulsory alternative community service was introduced under the Kreisky II cabinet in 1975 due to pressure by pacifist groups. The military was pleased by the development, because it led to fewer disruptions of military service due to pacifists refusing the use of weapons. Once an Austrian has completed compulsory alternative service, he is exempt from military service for life, and can therefore never be called for military duty, but if necessary again to a special alternative civilian service.

Though compulsory community service is firmly anchored in the constitution together with military service, it is supposed to be reserved for exceptional cases. Between 1975 and 1991 conscientious objectors had to explain their doubts in front of a commission, which would determine whether or not they would be sent to the Zivildienst. The compulsory community service lasted eight months, the same length as military service. The law was amended in 1991 so that objectors only need to declare their objection, rather than facing a commission. As a result, the number of objectors rose, so the length of the civilian service was increased in stages: first to 10 months in 1992; then 11 months; then 12 months in 1997 (including two weeks of holidays).

Between 1 April 2002 and 30 September 2005, the Zivildienstverwaltungs GmbH, organized as an affiliated limited liability company of the Austrian Red Cross, was responsible for distributing compulsory service personnel on behalf of the then responsible Austrian Federal Ministry of the Interior. This ended after the Austrian Constitutional Court demanded this activity as part of government and its integration into the interior ministry. Since October 2005, the Agency for the Alternative Civil Service (in German: ZISA for Zivildienstserviceagentur) handles all issues regarding the compulsory community service. Originally the ZISA was a departement of the interior ministry, between January 2020 until July 2022 the ZISA was part of the Federal Ministry of Agriculture, Regions and Tourism and since July 2022 the ZISA is part of the Federal Chancellery.

In 2004, the term of military service was reduced to six months, as recommended by a reform commission. Accordingly, the length of compulsory community service was adapted to nine months in 2006. Compulsory community service personnel, however, have the option to add another three months to their service for better pay through a private contract.

== Organisations taking advantage of Zivildienst personnel ==
Most conscientious objector draftees have to work for the Austrian Red Cross. Beyond that, more compulsory community service personnel have to work in eldercare and in hospitals. Other organisations are, for example, emergency medical services, kindergartens, fire brigades, in communities as crossing guards and other social organisations which care for the disabled or refugees. A few have to work in agriculture.

=== Occupational Areas ===
Occupational Areas of Zivildiener (in 2022)
Activity	total number	percentage
Emergency medical services	5,674	39.5%
Social care and handicapped aid services	3,855	26.8%
Geriatric care	1,613	11.2%
Hospitals	1,187	8.3%
Child care	584	4.1%
Disaster relief services and civil protection	387	2.7%
Refugee care, integration and consulting of foreigners	390	2.7%
Social work in agriculture	175	1.2%
Public security and traffic safety (crossing guards service)	169	1.2%
Nursing and health care	117	0.8%
Care for drug addicts	66	0.5%
Youth care	43	0.3%
Prisons	39	0.3%
environmental protection	27	0.2%
Domestic memorial service	25	0.2%
Civil defense	19	0.1%

== Types of Alternative Civilian Service ==
=== Regular Alternative Civilian Service ===
By 2014, more than 16,600 conscientious objectors enlisted on "Regular Alternative Civilian Service" (German: Ordentlicher Zivildienst), and the number of men enlisted for the mandatory alternative community service personnel has steadily increased. Since 2015, the number is decreasing. In 2019, the percentage of eligible men opting for Zivildienst increased again, but the actual number decreased, due to a year with a low birth rate. Therefore, the Austrian government decided to widen eligibility to the so-called "partial eligibility" (German: "Teiltauglichkeit"). Starting from January 2021, every man without physical or intellectual disabilities will be eligible for Zivildienst (and military service) to have the maximum number of men available for all mandatory services.

==== Number of enrolments for mandatory alternative community service ====
In 1975, 344 young men only registered for the newly created alternative civilian service, since then the number of man applying for Zivildienst has risen and remains at a level of around 40-50% of all fit men.

Number of conscripts registered for Zivildienst
Year	Number	Percentage	Number of fit conscripts	Number of partially fit conscripts (since 2021)
2015	15,888	48.65%	32,659	-
2016	14,987	46.16%	32,468	-
2017	13,932	45.79%	30,815	-
2018	13,466	43.82%	30,728	-
2019	13,428	47.77%	28,107	-
2020	14,093	48.40%	29,114	-
2021	15,392	42,95%	35,835	641
2022	16,380	N/A	N/A	711
2023	14,630	45.50%	31,516	639

==== Regional differences of enrolments for mandatory alternative community service ====
There are severe regional differences, while in Vorarlberg (52.8%) and Vienna (53.5%) more than half of the drafted men registered for the mandatory alternative community service (as of 2014), in Carinthia only slightly more than a quarter (26.3%) of eligible male citizens become conscientious objectors. By 2018, 66% of the male citizens of Vienna had opted to become Zivis.

Draft to Zivildienst per state in 2022
State	Number of conscripted men for Zivildienst	Percentage
Vienna	3,283	22.85%
Upper Austria	2,815	19.59%
Lower Austria	2,302	16.02%
Styria	1,830	12.73%
Tyrol	1,296	9.02%
Vorarlberg	960	6.68%
Salzburg	902	6.28%
Carinthia	548	3.81%
Burgenland	434	3.02%

=== Special Alternative Civilian Service ===
In times of crisis or during the state of emergency, the government can re-draft conscientious objectors under the age of 50, who already fulfilled their regular obligatory civil alternative service, for "Special Alternative Civilian Service" (German: Außerordentlicher Zivildienst). In April 2020, due to the COVID-19 pandemic, for the first time in history of Austrian Zivildienst, 3,500 men started with Außerordentlicher Zivildienst. 2,000 men volunteered and 1,500 men were drafted to special alternative service for the duration of three months after fulfilling their period of service to assist in the Austrian medical service. Due to a lack of necessity, the "Special Alternative Civilian Service" was stopped at the end of July 2020.

== Voluntary services as an alternative to the regular Zivildienst ==
=== Austrian Service Abroad ===
Since 1992, Austrian conscripts have the opportunity to work abroad. Andreas Maislinger took the idea from the German Action Reconciliation Service for Peace and founded the Austrian Service Abroad (in German: Auslandsdienst). This service is not part of the regular alternative civilian service, but a substitute to the regular Zivildienst which exempts its participants from the compulsory community service. These positions are very popular, so participants often have to wait for years in order to receive one. The Austrian Service Abroad lasts twelve months and can be served in three different services:

==== Austrian Holocaust Memorial Service ====
The German name is Gedenkdienst (for Memorial Service). The organization takes care of victims of Nazism.

==== Austrian Social Service ====
The Austrian Social Service supports the social and economic development of a country. It can be done at various deployment locations that are operated by a multitude of partner organisations.

==== Austrian Peace Service ====
The Austrian Peace Service service can be provided in five accepted partner organizations, which are in China, Israel, Japan or the Netherlands. Goal is to spend a year in those countries and understand the enormous complexity of the conflicts and to make a little contribution to the lasting assurance of peace.

=== Voluntary ecological year ===
Since 2013, it is possible to volunteer for the program of the voluntary ecological year (in German: Freiwilliges Umweltjahr / FUJ) for a minimum period of 10 months instead of the Zivildienst. The FUJ is an educational and orientation year for teenagers and young adults.

=== Voluntary social year ===
Since 2016, it is possible to volunteer for a minimum of 10 months for the program of the voluntary social year (in German: Freiwilliges Sozialjahr / FSJ) as an alternative to the regular Zivildienst. Reasons to join this program include gaining benefits, but it takes a few months longer than the Zivildienst.

== Compensation for Food ==
There has been years-long controversy in Austria as to the compensation for food of compulsory community service personnel. In 2001, an amendment to the law gave users of alternative civil service draftees a duty to ensure the proper nutrition of Zivildienst personnel, but did not define what "proper nutrition" entails.

As a result, many users of compulsory community service personnel chose to pay only €6.00 EUR per day in compensation for food, resulting in many protests and complaints. In the opinion of compulsory community service personnel, €6.00 EUR per day is insufficient to guarantee proper nutrition. As a result, the issue was taken to the courts in October 2005. The judgement agreed that €6.00 EUR per day is insufficient, and determined that an appropriate amount would be between €11.26 EUR and €13.60 EUR per day. This is the same amount to which military personnel are entitled.

== Weapon ban ==
Compulsory community service draftees are banned from owning or carrying weapons for fifteen years after completion of their service, which could impact negatively on their future employability. Those who served the Zivildienst were also forbidden from later joining the police service in Austria. However, the law was amended in 2010 to introduce certain circumstances under which the weapon ban could be lifted to pursue a career with the police forces. This involves former alternative civilian service personnel declaring that their conscientious doubts are over.
