= Emergency medical services in Austria =

Emergency Medical Service (EMS, Rettungsdienst or more frequently just Rettung) in Austria is a service of public pre-hospital emergency healthcare, including ambulance service, provided by individual Austrian municipalities, cities and counties. It is primarily financed by the Austrian health insurance companies.

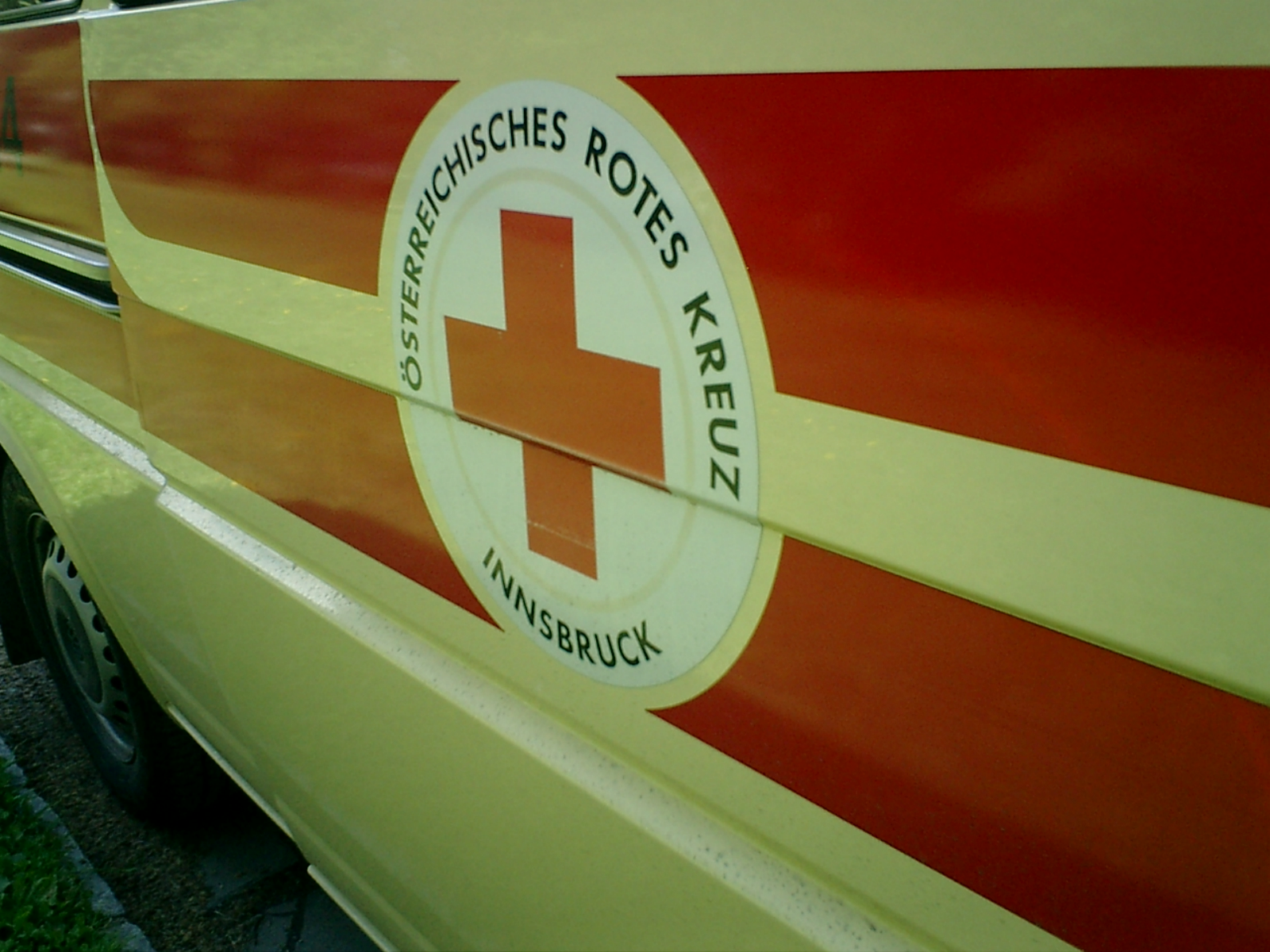
Emblem of the Austrian Red Cross on an ambulance in Innsbruck

== Organisation ==
St John Ambulance Service in Austria

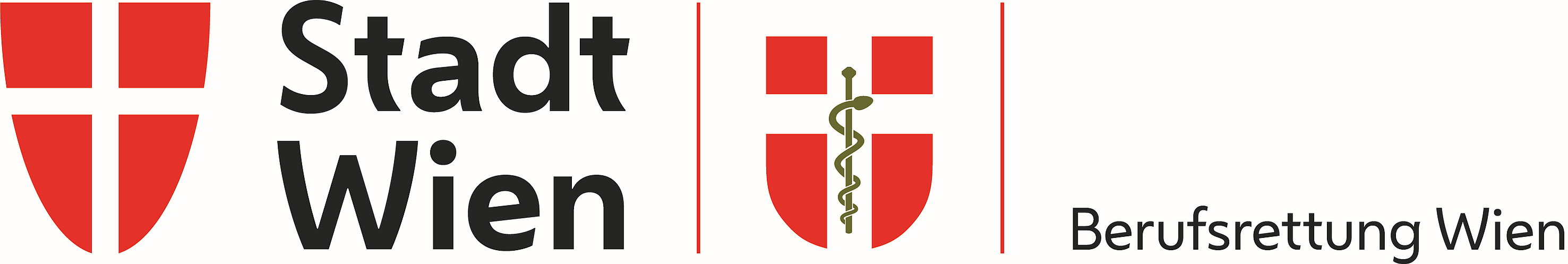
Logo of EMS Vienna. The city of Vienna operates the only one EMS in Austria, that is run by professional employees only.

Logo of the Austrian Workers Samaritans

In Austria the individual Austrian states (Bundesländer) are legally responsible for the provision of emergency services, but typically delegate these responsibilities to the individual community level. Municipalities, including both smaller communities (Gemeinden) and cities (Städte) are given responsibility by the State for operating EMS. Austrian law mandates the provision of rescue and fire services, including EMS, staffing and equipping according to levels which correspond to local population. Apart from Vienna, which operates its own EMS organisation (Berufsrettung Wien, also called Magistratsabteilung 70), all communities and cities delegate the responsibility to provide EMS to NPOs. Unlike other countries EMS in Austria is never provided by the fire department, the city of Admont being the only exception to this rule.

Apart from the Austrian Red Cross some other organisations provide EMS such as the

- Arbeiter-Samariter-Bund Österreichs (Labor-Samaritan-Alliance),
- the Malteser Hospitaldienst Austria (the Austrian organisation of the Order of Malta Ambulance Corps),
- the Johanniter-Unfall-Hilfe (the Austrian organisation of the St. John Ambulance) or
- the Grünes Kreuz (Green Cross).

=== Roles ===
As in many other places, in Austria, the EMS system performs two major functions:

- Emergency Services - Responding to all calls concerning immediate danger to the life and/or health of a person. This is the core component of the service, which is called Notfallrettung or Rettungsdienst in German. This service addresses acute onset illness and injury conditions, such as myocardial infarction, or accidents with severe injuries, to name just two. In severe cases the EMS-Crew is accompanied by an emergency physician (Notarzt). While these physicians are employees of the individual Austrian states and not the EMS organisation itself, they work together closely, sharing equipment, vehicles and uniforms.
- Non-Emergency Services - Arranging and performing the transport of non-emergency patients (i.e. transfer to, from, and between hospitals). This service is called Krankentransport or Sanitätseinsatz in German, and provides service to non-ambulatory patients with low-acuity or chronic conditions, or to those who are recovering from acute care situations, and who lack the ability to use other means of transport (i.e. by taxi, own car or public transport).

In addition to regular emergency and non-emergency services, there are Mobile Intensive Care Units MICU stationed in most of the major cities. These units correspond to the Critical Care Transport function found in other places. They are brought into action whenever a patient with a serious and complex medical condition, requiring advanced levels of support during transit needs to be transferred between hospitals. This service usually applies to intensive-care unit patients, hence the German name Intensivtransport.

While not formally affiliated with the EMS system, the General Practitioner (GP) frequently interacts with that system. In Austria, it is still commonplace for physicians to make house calls for those patients who are not able to visit a medical practice. Additionally, most cities and counties run a service called Ärztefunkdienst or Ärztenotdienst (Physician Home Call Service), which provides a GP to make housecalls for all people in the specific area. The physician will not only respond to patients from their own practice, but will also visit and treat patients all over the area. The GP service is usually only used for minor illnesses (i.e. fever, common cold), where a hospital stay is not necessary but the intervention of a Physician may be advisable. The availability of this service provides a better treatment option to those patients who, in other EMS systems, might generate low-acuity ambulance calls or emergency department visits. Occasionally, the visiting GP will contact the EMS dispatcher and order a Krankentransport, should it be determined following medical assessment, that the patient could be cared for in a safer and better manner in a hospital.

== Standards ==
=== Telephone numbers ===
==== Emergency telephone numbers ====
The nationwide emergency number for emergency medical services in Austria is 144. This number can be called toll-free from any phone (fixed-line, mobile or phone booth). This also applies to all the other emergency and most of the non-emergency numbers mentioned below. Alternatively the European emergency number 112 can also be used but by calling it one will end up at the nearest police station (which is nationwide available by calling 133) which will then pass the information to the EMS provider. In most cases it thus is advisable to call 144 as the call will be taken by a professional emergency medical dispatcher and help will be on its way more quickly. The European emergency number, however, must not be confused with the 122 which in Austria is the fire department. Dispatchers speak German and at least an intermediate level of English with focus on medical terms and issues.

==== Non-emergency telephone numbers ====
Apart from the emergency number there also is a huge variety of non-emergency numbers which should be used in non-emergency cases such as Krankentransport, for example. These numbers differ from region to region and provider to provider. Even though the Austrian Red Cross operates ambulances all over Austria there is a huge variety of non-emergency numbers such as 14 844 for Styria, 1484 for Carinthia or 01 52 144 for Vienna.

As already described above, in addition to the emergency and non-emergency services provided by the different organisations there is also a service called Ärztefunkdienst or Ärztenotdienst (Physician Home Call Service), which provides a GP to make housecalls for all people in the specific area and can be reached by dialling 141 everywhere in Austria.

The Healthcare number 1450, the first point of contact for health questions, was much used at the beginning of the COVID-19 pandemic in Austria. Because of the spread of the virus in mid-March 2020, there were about 70 times as many calls.

=== Vehicles ===
==== Landbased Ambulance ====
The Austrian EMS system's vehicles come in a wide variety of shapes and sizes. All of its vehicles must conform to most aspects of the requirements of European standard CEN 1789. The visual identity requirements of the European standard are deliberately not being followed, as they contradict to the traditional Austrian ambulance colours white and red (derived from the colours of the Red Cross' logo). Some organisations such as the Grünes Kreuz, however, have started to paint their new ambulances according to the requirements of the new standard. The five major types of vehicle are:

- The Krankentransportwagen (KTW), a van-type ambulance used for non-emergency transport.
- The Notfallkrankentransportwagen (NKTW), a multi-purpose vehicle serves a dual role as patient transport vehicle and as backup for emergency responses.
- The Rettungswagen (RTW), a larger van used for emergencies.
- The Notarztwagen (NAW), basically the same as a RTW but staffed with an emergency physician in addition to the other personnel.
- The Notarzteinsatzfahrzeug (NEF), a station wagon or small van. Its purpose is to bring the Notarzt (emergency physician) to the scene of the emergency, when required.

Other vehicles that are also employed include helicopters for the performance of air ambulance services or off-road vehicles to be able to access remote and impenetrable places.

In rural areas the most commonly used vehicles are NKTWs as they can be used for both, Krankentransports and emergencies. In bigger cities, however, a combination of RTWs and NKTWs is used to respond to emergencies. If a RTW or a NKTW is used to respond to an incident depends on two factors: The severity of the reported incident and the proximity of the vehicle. Both vehicles are staffed with similar personnel (at least two Rettungssanitäter, more commonly one Rettungssanitäter who acts as the ambulance driver and one Notfallsanitäter which takes care of the patient during the transport). If a severe incident such as, for example, a myocardial infarction is reported the dispatcher always sends the closest NKTW or RTW and a NEF to the scene. (See rendezvous system below for more information.)

EMS in Austria

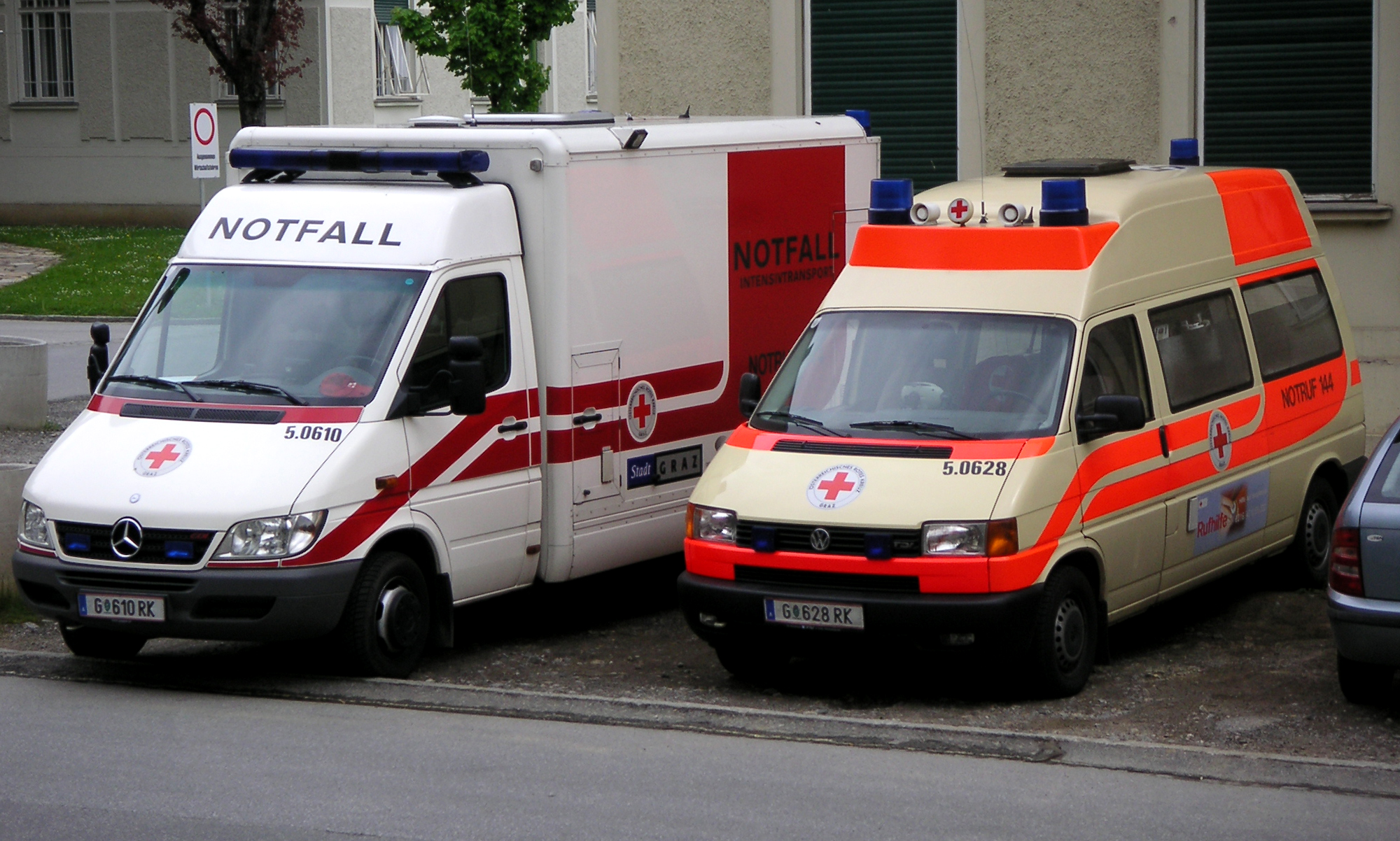
A RTW (left) and a NKTW (right) in Graz.

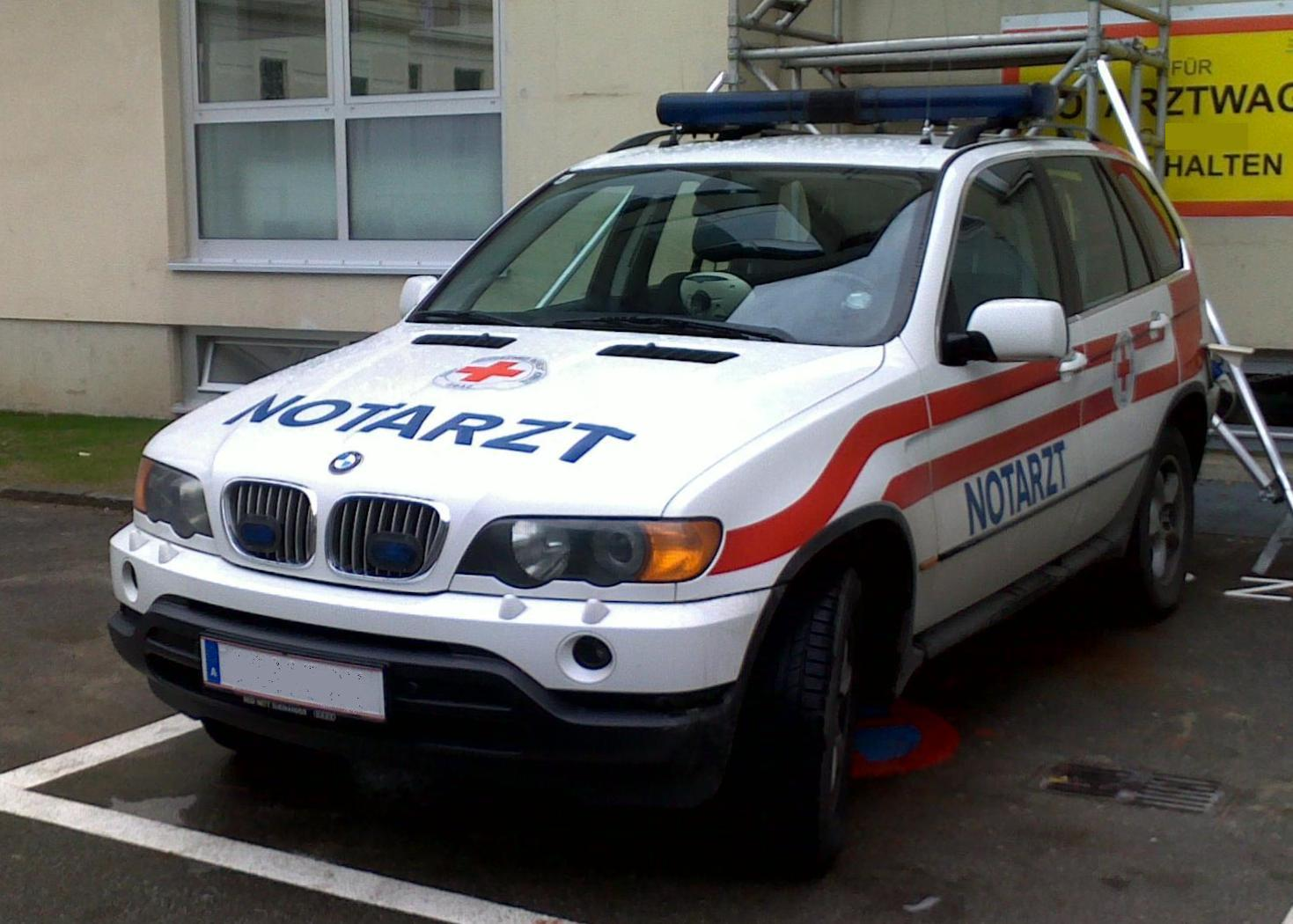
A NEF (NEF A) in Graz

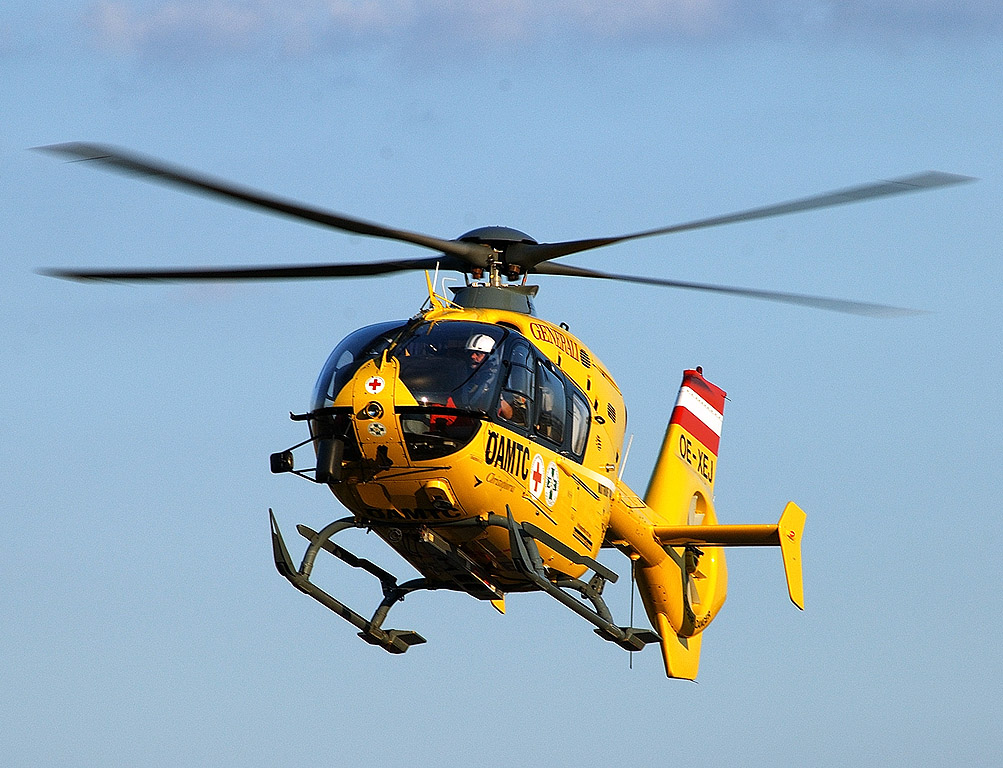
C12 air ambulance

==== Personnel ====
The medical emergency services are staffed by full-time employees, volunteers and drafted Zivildiener, which are conscientious objectors forced to serve up to nine months time in medical service, instead of military service.

- Rettungssanitäter (RS): Is a Basic Life Support EMT with 260–300 hours of training. The Rettungssanitäter is working mostly on KTW and NKTW vehicles. Because of the big number of volunteers, most of the Paramedics, have only this education level.
- Notfallsanitäter (NFS) except Vienna: Is an Intermediate Life Support EMT -I with 480 hours out and as well in hospital training. Before being allowed to start this education a minimum of 160 hours of experience is needed in the emergency medical service. According to the law (Sanitätergesetz) a Notfallsanitäter must always be aside an Emergency Physician-based vehicle as a Notarzteinsatzfahrzeug (NEF) and the Notarztwagen (NAW).
- Notfallsanitäter (NFS) in Vienna: in the city of Vienna a Notfallsanitäter must also be part of the team of each Rettungswagen (RTW). The Notfallsanitäter is trained according to international standards like the European Resuscitation Council (ERC) and mostly PHTLS and AMLS. He is allowed to administer some drugs, mostly oral and inhalative medications. The chief physician of the EMS Provider defines what drugs a paramedic is allowed to administer in which situation.
- Notfallkompetenz Arzneimittellehre und Venenzugang (NKA, NKV): The first Advanced Life Support Level in the Austrian Sanitätergesetz. Altogether the education will include 90 hours of training. The EMT will be allowed to start an I.V. and will have a bigger number of drugs to administer. According to the law, an EMT with this level will always have to inform a physician before starting intervention.
- Notfallkompezenz Intubation und Beatmung (NKI): Is currently the highest education level for Austrian EMT's. This level requires a minimum of 500 hours experience on a physician based emergency vehicle. The education includes 110 hours of in and out hospital training and will allow the EMT to intubate a patient without pre-medication in a cardiac arrest situation. The other skill set remains the same as of the NKV paramedic. This education is controversial in the Austrian Emercency Medical Services because of the different interests of EMS providers according to the training level of EMT. While some EMS providers barely educate Notfallsanitäter, some EMS providers already started an advanced paramedic education as a pilot project to improve the skill level and relieve the emergency physicians.
- Notarzt (Emergency physician): The highest trained staff in the Austrian Emergency Medical Service. After the medical study of 6 years he has to do 60 hours of pre-hospital medicine training course and will be allowed to work as a Notarzt. Mostly the Notarzt is already a trained anesthesiologist or in intensive care physician. The exact requirements to work as emergency physician are depending on the EMS provider the physician will work at.

==== Equipment ====
The basic equipment of the above-mentioned vehicles are obligatory and are minimal requirements:

- Basic First Aid kit.
- Dressings and Bandages
- Gurney and blankets
- Flexible stretcher, also called a Reeves stretcher.
- Rigid or collapsible transport chair, called a stair chair in the United States
- Mobile medical ventilator
- Basic diagnostic equipment, like blood-pressure cuffs.
- Portable defibrillator

Depending on the type of the vehicle, there are numerous items which have to be on the ambulance, among them are:

- An ECG monitor
- Rescue equipment
- Immobilization equipment like Cervical collars or spine boards
- Equipment for intravenous therapy

Additionally, several different kinds of drugs are found on an Ambulance, typically a selection of analgesics, anaesthetics, cardiac stimulants, substances for circulatory problems and antidotes. Narcotics are not widely carried on ambulances. Usually only the Notarzt will carry a small amount of Morphine, Fentanyl or Piritramide and closely guard them.

EMS Equipment and Work Environment

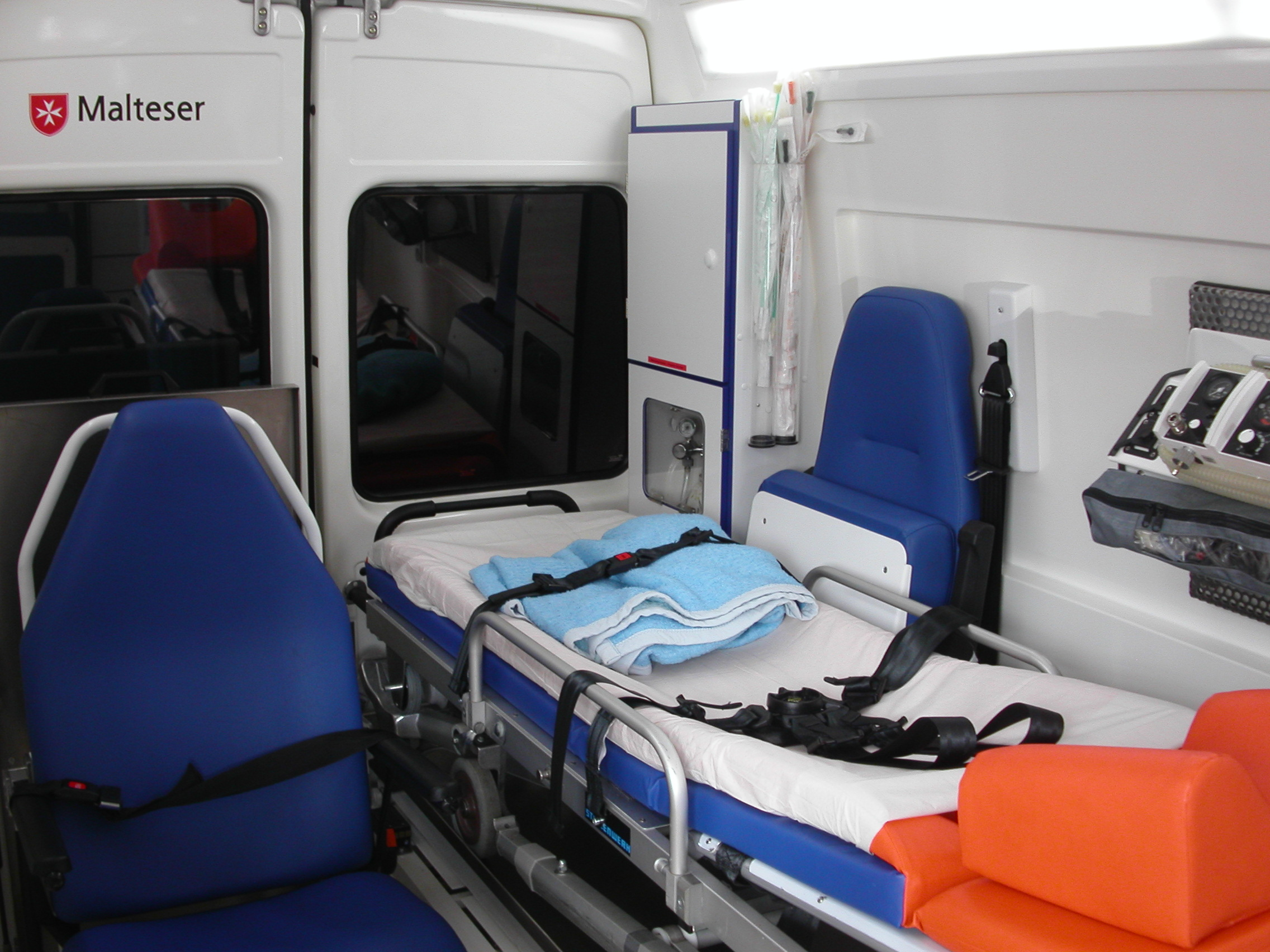
Interior view of a NKTW: transport chair (left) gurney (middle) paramedic's chair(right). One can also see the O_{2} - bottles (cabinet in the rear) and the medical ventilator (right foreground).

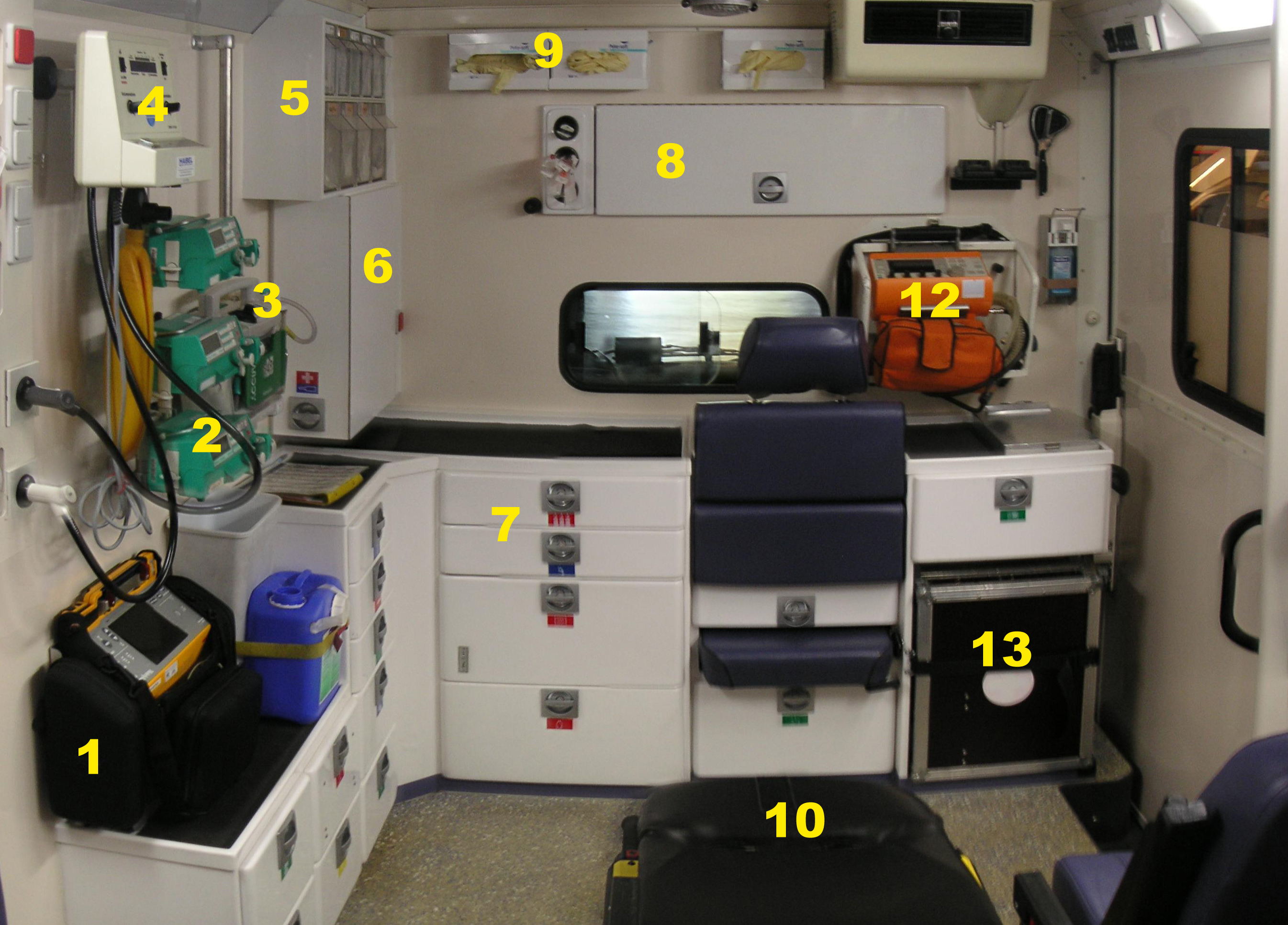
Interior of a RTW

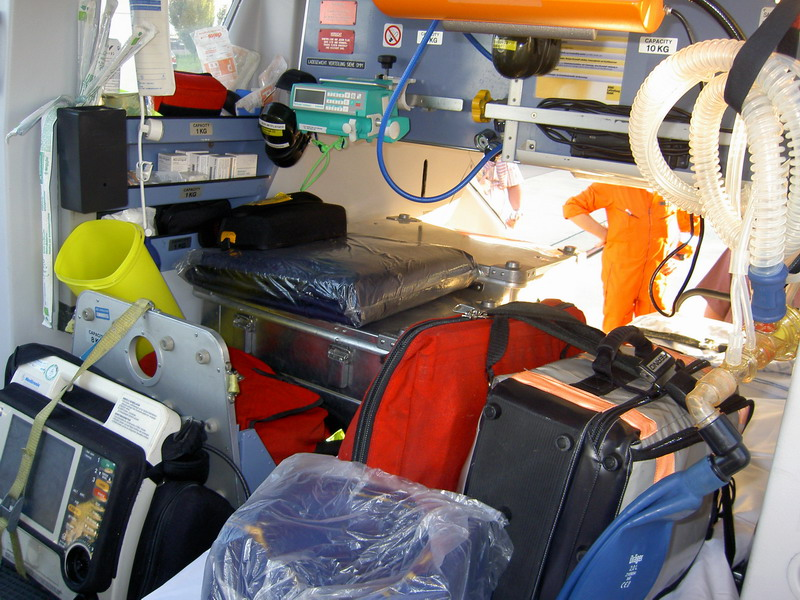
Interior view of an air ambulance helicopter

=== Dispatch ===
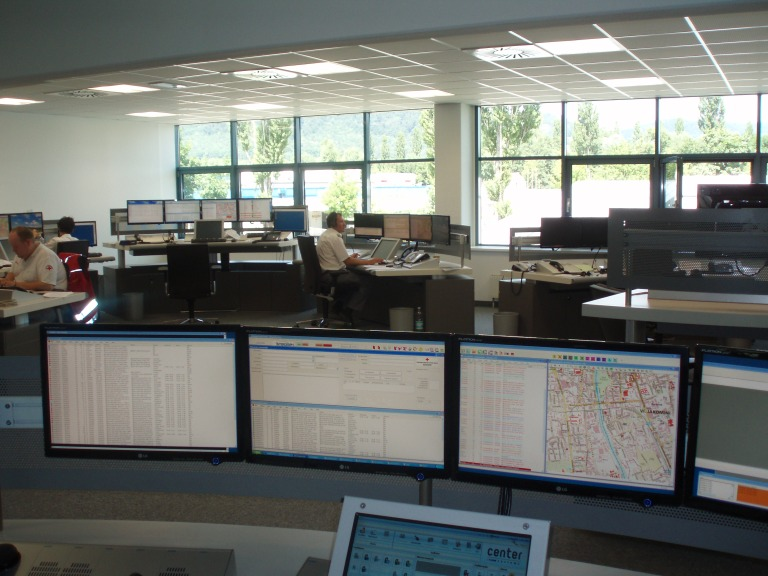
A modern Austrian Leitstelle

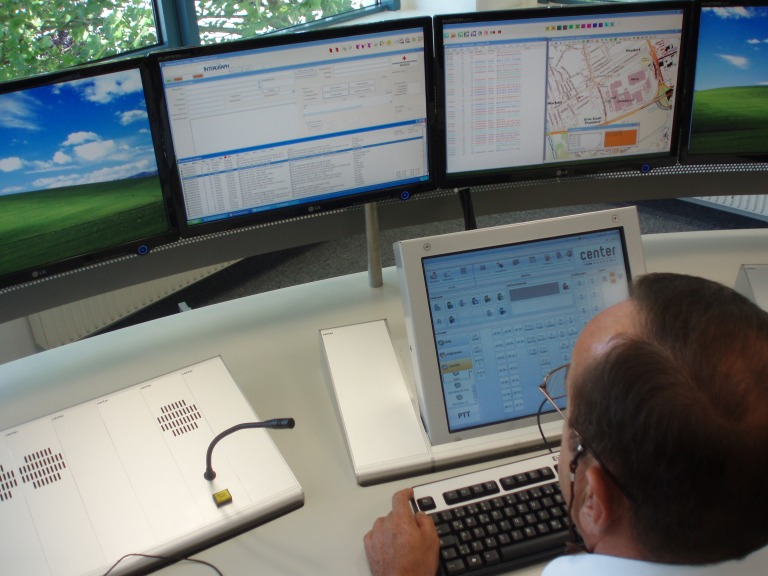
Workplace of a dispatcher

All emergency calls, regardless of the emergency number on which they originate, are routed to Dispatch Centres; in German Leitstelle. Until the year 2000 it was very common that every district had its own dispatch centre which, in a way, was quite ineffective. At present more and more trans-regional dispatch centres are being built. That means that all 144 calls in Styria, for example, are routed to the same dispatch centre in Graz no matter where in Styria the caller is located. The same trend can be seen in other federal states. A system similar to the U.S.-based 9-1-1 Public Safety Answering Point concept is not being used due to the significantly different nature of the calls for EMS, the fire brigade or the police.

Once a call via the local emergency number is placed, a call taker will answer and ask the caller about the nature of the emergency. While the caller is being interviewed about call specifics, the call taker is already working on the computer, which will provide prompt questions, provide advice, and suggest response resources for this emergency. Whilst the call taker is still talking to the caller a dispatcher will already look up the ambulance which is the closest to the scene and dispatch it. This computer system, while operating in German, is more or less similar to the AMPDS algorithm used by Emergency Medical Dispatchers in the United States but varies from one federal state to the other.

To illustrate, a call is received in the dispatch center about a possibly unconscious person. The call taker will immediately identify the call location, and will then ask further questions, in order to assess precipitating symptoms, specific location, and any special circumstances (no house number, a neighbor is calling, etc.). While this interview is occurring, the call taker will enter the command Bewusstlose Person (unconscious person) into the dispatch computer, resulting in an automatic suggestion to dispatch of a RTW (emergency ambulance) or NKTW and a NEF (emergency physician car). Upon entering the address of the patient, the computer will look for the emergency vehicles closest to this address. Now the dispatcher can send the whole package over the air and those two vehicles are alarmed, similar to Computer-assisted dispatch (CAD) in the United States. Whilst the vehicles are being alarmed by the dispatcher, the call taker may remain on the line with the caller, providing telephone advice or assistance until the EMS resources arrive on the scene. While still on the line with the caller the dispatcher is able to guide the ambulance to the scene and provide the crew with additional and more precise information about the incident. This, of course, happens without any notice of the caller and will help to get the EMS resources on scene more quickly.

==== Average response times ====
Apart from Burgenland the maximum response time (the maximum time in which an ambulance must be on scene) is not governed in Austria. The Red Cross, however, follows the self-imposed policy that every place next to a street has to be reached in at most 15 minutes in 95% of all cases. These requirements are met in most cases but one has to keep in mind, that response times differ very much depending on whether the incident occurred in a rural area or in a city as EMS stations are mostly located in cities. In cities the average response time is between five and ten minutes, in rural areas it is about eight to 15 minutes.
