= Compulsory Border Protection Service =

Compulsory national service in Germany

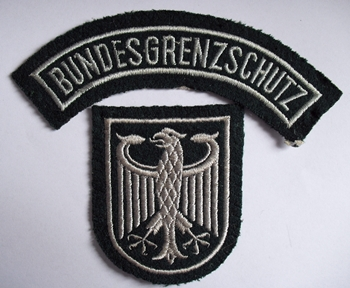
BGS Federal Eagle (Bundesadler) worn from 1976 until 2001

The Compulsory Border Protection Service (German: Grenzschutzdienstpflicht) was enacted by the German parliament in the Federal Border Protection Act of 18 August 1972, based on Article 12a of the German Constitution. The remaining provisions of the Federal Border Protection Act were repealed in 1994. However, compulsory border protection service has not been enforced since 1973. Anyone who serves or served in the Federal Border Protection (German: Bundesgrenzschutz) can no longer be assigned to the military service (§ 42a Conscription Law) in the Federal Defence Forces (German: Bundeswehr). In 2005 the Federal Border Protection was renamed the Federal Police (German: Bundespolizei) and any mandatory service would be performed there.

== History ==
The implementation of compulsory border protection service has to be seen in a historical context. Until the 1980s the BGS was organized as a paramilitary force that could be deployed nationwide, either at the inner-German border, but also elsewhere in case of civil disorder. Domestic military operations of any kind on the territory of West Germany were prohibited for the Bundeswehr at that time. The BGS used heavy military equipment and the officers were officially combatants until 1994. Furthermore, the member states of the Warsaw Pact maintained a very large number of Internal Troops, mainly staffed by conscript soldiers like the East German Volkspolizei-Bereitschaften (VPB). Interior troops were a considerable reinforcement of the infantry forces during the arms race of the Cold War period and were not affected by disarmament negotiations as they were not part of the regular military.

After the "German Emergency Acts" (German: Notstandsgesetze) were enacted in 1968, the tasks of the BGS changed slowly. The military task was gradually reduced, because in a State of Defence (German: Verteidigungsfall or V-Fall) the Bundeswehr was and still is thereafter empowered in very limited circumstances to be deployed in domestic disturbances. Nevertheless, the BGS was equipped with light and medium infantry weapons until the mid-eighties and still, now nominated as Bundespolizei maintains armoured personnel carriers like the LAPV Enok or Mowag Eagle.

== Drafting of Border Protection ==
Men at the age of eighteen, or older if they were former members of the Federal Police or if they had not previously served in the military or federal police, can be drafted to the border protection service. Mandatory service can be introduced if there are not enough volunteers joining the federal police. If the need is covered by volunteers at a later date, currently drafted persons are to be released. The employment status of the draftees is similar to the status during military service. The service is divided into border protection basic service, border protection exercises and perpetual border protection service in case of defense and in the cases mentioned in article 91 of the constitution. After their service has been completed, members are transferred to the border protection reserve.

== Current enforcement of the draft ==
Similar to the suspended conscription for military service since 2011, the compulsory border protection service is legally paused since 1994, but can be reactivated anytime by a resolution of the parliament.

== See also ==
- Border guard
- Border guards of the inner German border
- Civil conscription
- Internal Troops
- Law enforcement in Germany
