= Healthcare number 1450 =

Austrian medical helpline

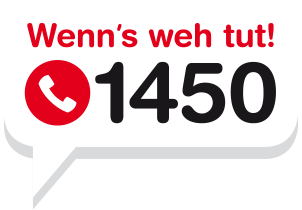
Healthcare telephone number 1450

The Healthcare number 1450 - "When it hurts! 1450" - is the first point of contact for health questions in Austria. Specially trained qualified nursing staff advise callers on their health complaints.

If the callers do not know to whom they should contact because of their symptoms, the trained staff members give appropriate recommendations for symptoms by asking specific questions using a medical-scientific query system - taking into account the current whereabouts of the caller. Therefore, on a low-threshold level the Austrian emergency call 144, reception desks in outpatient clinics and doctors in private practice can be relieved.

Telephone health counselling began as a pilot project "TeWeb" (telephone and web-based first contact and counselling service) on 7 April 2017 in Vienna, Lower Austria and Vorarlberg and went into operation throughout Austria on 4 November 2019. The telephone number can be reached 24 hours a day and also at weekends. The caller only incurs the usual telephone costs according to their telephone tariff.

The providers of the telephone health advice service are the states of Austria, the umbrella organisation of social insurance and the Federal Ministry of Social Affairs, Health, Care and Consumer Protection.

== Covid-19 pandemic ==
Especially at the beginning of the COVID-19 pandemic in Austria, this number became well-known, as potential COVID-19 infected persons should under no circumstances go to a doctor or to an outpatient clinic in order to reduce the risk of infection. Due to the spread of the coronavirus in mid-March, there were about 70 times as many calls. Due to the high number of inquiries and the resulting congestion, it was requested that only those specifically affected should call with a specific question. For general questions about the coronavirus, an information hotline was set up by the Agency for Health and Food Safety (AGES) on 27 January 2020 under the Austrian number 0800/555621.
