= Voluntary social year =

Social voluntary service for young people, used in Germany and Austria

The Voluntary Social Year in Germany and, in a much lesser dimension, in Austria, is a government-funded voluntary work program particularly for young adults (ages 16 to 27). It can last between six and eighteen months. It can also be spent abroad.

== Germany ==
=== History ===
The voluntary social year (German: Freiwilliges Soziales Jahr / FSJ) developed from the "diaconal year" organized by the Protestant and Catholic Church the first time in 1954, the 100th anniversary of the Diakoniewerk in Germany. The appeal to volunteer was addressed to young women who would provide service to the sick and those in need of care.

In 1962 the "Philadelphic Service" (German: Philadelphischen Dienst) has been initiated by Gertrud Rückert. She wanted to offer a voluntary social year for female high school graduates before they start studying for personal and professional orientation. At that time it was a completely new concept and a forerunner of the voluntary social year, that was later legally anchored in Germany. On February 14, 1963, the government introduced a draft law to offer a voluntary social year in parliament, the Bundestag. The law finally came into force on April 1, 1964.

Until the suspension of conscription for military service and therefore of the alternative service in 2011 as well, the voluntary social year was also recognized as alternative to military service in Germany.

=== Legal basis ===
==== Duration ====
A duration to volunteer in the FSJ is between 6 and 18 months maximum. In exceptional cases the service can last up to 24 months, if this is justified by a special educational concept. If a voluntary social year is initially completed for less than 18 months, it can be extended to 15 months (in the case of a deployment in Germany), with the consent of the provider of the FSJ. The voluntary social year can also be completed abroad.

The starting times are usually between August and October of each year. Some porters offer the option of lateral entry.

==== Training ====
The providers of a voluntary social year are obliged to provide the volunteers with at least 25 training days during a 12-month service. Depending on the time spent in the voluntary service, it is also possible to complete more or fewer training days. According to the Voluntary Service Act, volunteers are obliged to take part in the training days.

==== Social security and retirement provision ====
Volunteers of the FSJ receive full social insurance. According to Social Code IV, the agency (or the place of assignment) pays the full costs for social insurance (employee and employer shares). The time of the voluntary social year is taken into account for the pension fund (compulsory pension insurance) The volunteers have a similar legal status to apprentices.

==== New legislation ====
Since June 1, 2008, the legal regulations have been merged with those of the Voluntary Ecological Year in a new bill for Youth Voluntary Services.

=== Branches of the FSJ ===
FSJ for cultural engagement

FSJ in politics

There are different areas of operations. The services are divided into different branches:

- FSJ im sozialen Bereich (FSJ for social caring)
- FSJ in der Kultur (FSJ for cultural engagement)
- FSJ im Sport (FSJ for sports)
- FSJ in der Politik: (FSJ in politics)
- FSJ in der Denkmalpflege (FJD) (FSJ for preservation of historical monuments)
- FSJ Schule (FSJ for schools)

=== Operational areas ===
The operational areas for FSJ volunteers are all social, charitable, or of public utility:

- Services for people with disabilities
- Hospitals
- Nursing homes
- Retirement homes
- Foster homes
- Preservation of historic monuments
- Ambulatory services
- Youth welfare services
- Church communities
- Emergency medical services
- Children's homes

=== Volunteers in the FSJ ===
The number of volunteers of the Voluntary Social Year:

Freiwilliges Soziales Jahr volunteers
| Year | percentage of female volunteers | percentage of male volunteers | percentage of third gender/various volunteers | percentage of no gender specified | number of female volunteers | number of male volunteers | number of third gender / various volunteers | number of no gender specification | total number of volunteers |
|---|---|---|---|---|---|---|---|---|---|
| 2011 | 63.88% | 36.12% | - | - | 30,074 | 17,003 | - | - | 47,077 |
| 2012 | 64.47% | 35.53% | - | - | 30,895 | 17,023 | - | - | 47,918 |
| 2013 | 64.22% | 35.78% | - | - | 33,090 | 18,433 | - | - | 51,523 |
| 2014 | 64.22% | 35.78% | - | - | 34,182 | 19,044 | - | - | 53,226 |
| 2015 | 64.48% | 35.52% | - | - | 35,309 | 19,449 | - | - | 54,758 |
| 2016 | 63.79% | 36.21% | - | - | 35,942 | 20,405 | - | - | 56,347 |
| 2017 | 63.85% | 36.15% | - | - | 35,065 | 19,854 | - | - | 54,919 |
| 2018 | 64.28% | 35.72% | - | - | 35,301 | 19,616 | - | - | 54,917 |
| 2019 | 63.19% | 35.74% | 0.35% | - | 34,061 | 19,046 | 187 | - | 53,294 |
| 2020 | 64.85% | 34.87% | 0.28% | - | 34,584 | 18,596 | 151 | - | 53,331 |
| 2021 | 64.86% | 34.75% | 0.38% | - | 33,950 | 18,191 | 201 | - | 52,342 |
| 2022 | 64.64% | 34.00% | 0.59% | 0.78% | 30,270 | 15,921 | 276 | 363 | 46,830 |
| 2023 | 65.60 % | 33.27 % | 0.68 % | 0.45 % | 30,784 | 15,614 | 321 | 211 | 46,930 |
| 2024 | 65.29 % | 33.24 % | 0.78 % | 0.69 % | 31,884 | 16,234 | 380 | 339 | 48,837 |
| 2025 | 65.69 % | 33.69 % | 0.67 % | 0.25 % | 30,827 | 15,886 | 318 | 118 | 47,149 |

== Austria ==
The voluntary social year (the German terms: Freiwilliges Sozialjahr and Freiwilliges Soziales Jahr are in use) in Austria is very similar to the FSJ in Germany. Since 1968 the FSJ is organized by the Association for the Promotion of Voluntary Social Services (German: Verein zur Förderung freiwilliger sozialer Dienste) and is legally regulated in the Volunteer bill. The association has its seat in Vienna and its secretariat in Linz. Regional offices are located in Graz, Vienna, Innsbruck and Salzburg.

=== Regular voluntary social year ===
Young people can volunteer in the FSJ for ten to twelve months in a social institution in Austria. The areas of responsibilities are assistance for people with disabilities, for old people, children or young people or working with homeless people respectively. The working time of the volunteers is 34 hours per week. While there were around 300–400 FSJ volunteers in 2012, in 2020 about 1,100 volunteers were registered.

Due to the existing conscription for military service in the Austrian Armed Forces, the voluntary social year is a substitute to the regular alternative service, called Zivildienst, since 2016.

=== Special voluntary social year ===
Similar to the "Special Alternative Civilian Service" (German: Außerordentlicher Zivildienst), during times of crisis or a state of emergency, men and women can again volunteer for a "special voluntary social year" (German: Außerordentliches Freiwilliges Soziales Jahr), if they already have completed a regular voluntary social year. This special FSH can last for a period of one to nine months. The hours of work, positions, pocket money and insurance correspond to the conditions of the regular FSJ. In 2020, due to the COVID-19 pandemic, the "special FSJ" was activated for the first time in history and lasted until December 31, 2020.

=== Volunteers in the FSJ ===
Due to the results of a 2015 evaluation, in average Austrian FSJ volunteers are 19 years old, with 95% being women and 5% men. 96% of the volunteers receive the children's allowance and two-thirds live with their parents.

Freiwilliges Soziales Jahr volunteers in Austria (not all numbers available)
| year | number of female volunteers | number of male volunteers | number of third gender / various volunteers | total number of volunteers |
|---|---|---|---|---|
| 2012 | N/A | N/A | N/A | 375 |
| 2013 | N/A | N/A | N/A | N/A |
| 2014 | N/A | N/A | N/A | N/A |
| 2015 | N/A | N/A | N/A | 853 |
| 2016 | 822 | 145 | N/A | 967 |
| 2017 | 819 | 195 | N/A | 1,014 |
| 2018 | 842 | 202 | N/A | 1,044 |
| 2019 | 908 | 234 | N/A | 1,142 |
| 2020 | 928 | 283 | N/A | 1,211 |
| 2021 | 1,157 | 337 | N/A | 1,494 |
| 2022 | 1,136 | 363 | N/A | 1,499 |
| 2023 | N/A | N/A | N/A | 1,293 |
| 2024 | N/A | N/A | N/A | 1,738 |
| 2025 | 1,362 | 578 | 7 | 1,947 |

== See also ==
- European Solidarity Corps
- Federal volunteers service
- Voluntary ecological year
- Volunteering
