= State of defence =

Constitutional state of emergency in Germany

The state of defence (German: Verteidigungsfall, pronounced [fɛɐ̯ˈtaɪ̯dɪɡʊŋsˌfal]) is the constitutional state of emergency in Germany if the country is "under attack by armed force or imminently threatened with such an attack". Established by a constitutional amendment in 1968 during the Cold War, this state of emergency gives the Federal Government extraordinary powers in wartime. It is laid down in Title Xa of the German Constitution. As of present, Germany has never been in the state of defence.

In the Bundeswehr it is also called the V-Fall, whereas the Gehlen Organization called it the E-System or E-Fall.

The preliminary stage to a state of defence is a state of tension (Article 80a). It goes hand in hand with raising the military alert level.

== Declaration ==
According to article 115a of the German Constitution, the state of defence shall be declared if "the federal territory [of the Federal Republic of Germany] is under attack by armed force or imminently threatened with such an attack".

The normal procedure is that, upon request of the Federal Government, the Bundestag determines that the conditions of the state of defence exist. That means that the Bundestag does not actually declare the state of defence; instead, it just decides whether it exists or not. (If, for example, a foreign army invaded Germany, the Bundestag would determine that the action is an "attack by armed force", as described in article 115a, and so Germany is in the state of defence.) The determination requires at least two thirds of the votes of the Bundestag present at that time (at least half of the members being the quorum). It also has to be approved by the Bundesrat with more than half of its members, which, according to general Bundesrat protocol, is given in bundled form by each Land.

According to the prevailing opinion, a terrorist attack that is limited in terms of time and location, as well as a cyber attack, can only lead to a state of defence if the destabilization triggered thereby threatens the existence of the state. In the event of catastrophes, the Bundeswehr can also be deployed domestically as a result of emergency regulations, which therefore does not justify a state of defence. The Federal Constitutional Court can also declare a declaration of the state of defence in such a situation to be unconstitutional.

If the Bundestag or the Bundesrat is not able to convene in time or not able to reach a quorum, the Joint Committee decides on their behalf, but approval by the Bundestag and Bundesrat has to be achieved as quickly as possible afterwards.

If Germany is under attack by armed force and the Bundestag, the Bundesrat and the Joint Committee are not able to determine the state of defence immediately, "the determination shall be deemed to have been made and promulgated at the time the attack began". If, for example, an invasion started on January 4 at 4:17 a.m., Germany would be in the state of defence from that time, and the government could react immediately.

If the state of defence is determined, this determination is announced by the Federal President in the Federal Law Gazette. If it is not possible to promulgate this in the Federal Law Gazette, it will be promulgated in some other way, usually via the media. The determination in the Federal Law Gazette must be made up for as soon as possible.

== Consequences ==
=== Commander-in-chief ===
According to Article 115b GG, the Federal Chancellor becomes Commander-in-chief of the armed forces. (Normally, the Minister of Defence holds that post.) He then combines political and military decision-making powers in his person. He does not become part of the armed forces himself and is therefore not a combatant under law of war. This concentration of powers on the Federal Chancellor was controversial. However, the soldiers swear to serve the Federal Republic of Germany faithfully and to defend the rights and freedom of the German people, which means that even in the state of defence there is no total loyalty to a person and his orders, as was the case with the Hitler Oath.

=== Bundeswehr ===
In the state of defence, the Bundeswehr has the authority under Article 87a of the Basic Law to protect civilian objects and to carry out traffic control tasks insofar as this is necessary to fulfill its defence mission. In addition, it can be assigned the protection of civilian objects to support police measures.

=== Extension of federal legislative powers ===
According to Article 115c GG, the Federal Government has extended legislative powers:

- The Federal Government may pass laws with respect to any matter even if it would normally be under exclusive legislative power of the Länder.
- Temporary provisions concerning the compensation for expropriations may differ from those laid down in the constitution.
- A law may rule that people arrested by police may be held in custody for four days before being brought before a judge (instead of "no later than the day following his arrest".) However, that applies only if no judge has been able to act in the normal time limit.
- Laws concerning financial matters may differ from the requirements laid down in the titles VIII, (The Execution of Federal Laws and the Federal Administration) VIIIa (Joint Tasks) and X (Finance) of the constitution.

=== Use of Federal Police ===
According to article 115f, paragraph (1), clause 1 GG, the Federal Government may employ the Federal Police (New name of the Federal Border Police) throughout the federal territory, everywhere in Germany. It is normally responsible for border protection, tasks of the railway police and in the field of aviation security as well as the protection of federal bodies. By law a Compulsory Border Guard Service is still in force, but will only be executed in the state of defence or if there are not enough volunteers joining the Federal Police.

=== Extended powers of instruction ===
According to article 115f, paragraph (1), clause 2 GG, the Federal Government may issue instructions to state governments and state authorities. (Normally, state governments act on their own, and state authorities receive their orders only from the state government.)

=== State governments ===
According to Article 115i, the state governments or the authorities designated by them have the powers that the Basic Law grants to the Federal Government in the event of a state of defence if the latter is unable to take the measures necessary to avert the imminent danger.

=== Federal Constitutional Court ===
According to Article 115g, the following regulations apply to the Federal Constitutional Court during the state of defence. The Federal Constitutional Court Act may only be amended by the Joint Committee if the court deems it necessary to maintain its functionality. Until then, the court can take measures to maintain its functionality.

=== Declarations under international law ===
According to Article 115a, if the determination of the state of defence has been promulgated, and if the federal territory is under attack by armed force, the Federal President, with the consent of the Bundestag, may issue declarations under international law regarding the existence of the state of defence.

=== Conscription ===
In 2011, the German Conscription Act was changed to suspend - but not abolish - peacetime conscription. Since July 1, conscripts may not be drafted except during a State of Tension or a state of defence.

== Legislative procedure ==
The normal legislative procedure is replaced by a faster one. According to article 115d GG, bills are discussed "without delay" and adopted by the Bundestag and the Bundesrat, in a single joint session. The promulgation can initially also be made in another way, but must be made up for in the Federal Law Gazette as soon as possible.

=== Joint Committee ===
The Joint Committee (Gemeinsamer Ausschuss) consists of members of the Bundestag and members of the Bundesrat. Two thirds of the committee members are provided by the Bundestag, one third provided by the Bundesrat. The committee members of the Bundestag are designated by the Bundestag "in proportion to the relative strength of the various parliamentary groups". Every Land is represented by a Bundesrat member. The committee members of the Bundestag must not be members of the Cabinet, and the committee members of the Bundesrat are exceptionally "not bound by instructions". There are thus 16 members of the Bundesrat (one for each Land), and 32 members of the Bundestag (twice the number of Bundesrat members), giving it a total number of 48 members. The members of the Joint Committee and their deputies are already designated during peacetime.

The Joint Committee takes over the tasks of both the Bundestag and the Bundesrat if, during the state of defence, it determines, with a two-thirds majority of its vote, that either the Bundestag or the Bundesrat is not able to convene in time or reach a quorum. That majority must include at least a majority of all committee members (at least 25 members). For example, if only 30 committee members could be reached, 20 votes would be a two-thirds majority, but at least 25 votes would be required for the determination. If the Joint Committee is not able to reach full strength (48 members), the Bundestag (in case of missing or dead Bundestag committee members) and/or the state governments (in case of missing or dead Bundesrat committee members) designate new committee members.

The Joint Committee takes over any task normally dealt by the Bundestag and/or the Bundesrat. All decisions which would normally be made by the either the Bundestag, or the Bundesrat, or both of them, is made by the entire Joint Committee. However, there are some limitations to the power of the Joint Committee (when compared to Bundestag and Bundesrat):

- It may not amend, abrogate or suspend the constitution, in whole or in part.
- It may not enact laws pursuant to Articles 23 (European Union - Protection of basic rights - Principle of subsidiarity), 24 (Transfer of sovereign powers - System of collective security), or 29 (New delimitation of the federal territory) of the constitution.
- A constructive vote of no confidence by the Joint Committee requires a two-thirds majority (instead of just the majority of the votes needed for a vote of no confidence by the Bundestag).
- Laws enacted by the Joint Committee may be repealed at any time by the Bundestag, with the consent of the Bundesrat.
- Laws and ordinances passed by the Joint Committee shall become ineffective no later than six months after the end of the state of defence.

The Joint Committee is based on Articles 53a (Composition - Rules of procedure) and 115e (Joint Committee) of the constitution, as well as on own rules of procedure.

With the consent of the Bundesrat, the Bundestag has the right at any time to declare the state of defence at an end. In this way there is no risk of the Joint Committee becoming a permanent parliament.

=== Extended electoral terms ===
According to article 115h GG, electoral terms that would expire during the state of defence are extended:

- The electoral term of the Bundestag or a state parliament ends six months after the end of the state of defence.
- The term of office of the President ends nine months after the end of the state of defence.
- The term of office of a member of the Federal Constitutional Court ends six months after the end of the state of defence.

The dissolution of the Bundestag is excluded.

== Termination ==
According to article 115l GG, the state of defence can be ended at any time and must be if the conditions for its determination are no longer met. The decision must be made by the Bundestag with the consent of the Bundesrat and announced by the Federal President. The Bundesrat can demand that the Bundestag decide on this. Federal law decides on the conclusion of peace.
