= Gemeinsamer Ausschuss =

Constitutional body in Germany

Joint Committee Gemeinsamer Ausschuss
- 20th Bundestag and 78th year of business of the Bundesrat

Type
- Type: Emergency parliament
- Established: 1968

Leadership
- President of the Bundestag (ex officio): Julia Klöckner
- Seats: 48

Website
- bundestag.de

The Joint Committee (German: Gemeinsamer Ausschuss) is non-permanent a constitutional body in the institutional framework of the Federal Republic of Germany. It is designed as an emergency parliament in the case of a State of Defence. It consists of 48 members of which two thirds are members of the Bundestag and one third are members of the Bundesrat, the latter representing the governments of the states of Germany (Länder). It was established in 1968 by an amendment of the Basic Law. Ever since then, the Bundestag and the state governments have elected members to serve on the committee. Since a state of defence has never been declared, the Joint Committee has never convened as of 2026. Nevertheless, the federal government is obligated at all times (even in peacetime) to inform the Joint Committee of its plans in the event of a defense emergency.

== Function ==
The constitutional role of the Joint Committee is defined in Article 53a of the Basic Law for the Federal Republic of Germany. The 32 members selected by the Bundestag are elected at the beginning of each legislative period. The sixteen state representatives are selected by their state governments whenever a new state cabinet enters office. The Joint Committee may take over certain powers of the Bundestag and the Bundesrat if a state of defence has been declared and if Bundestag is unable to convene because of "insurmountable obstacles". The Joint Committee may take this decision itself with a two-thirds majority of members present, which has to equal a majority of all members. After that, the Joint Committee may in principle enact federal laws in place of the Bundestag and the Bundesrat. Laws enacted by the Joint Committee expire automatically six months after the end of the State of Defence, if they have not previously been reconfirmed by the Bundestag and, if applicable, by the Bundesrat.

The Joint Committee may under no circumstance change the Basic Law, change the borders of the German states or transfer sovereign rights to supranational organisations; it may not permanently repeal or amend existing laws, but may only suspend or change (parts of) them for the duration of the state of defence. The Federal Constitutional Court Act may only be changed or (partly) suspended with the court's approval. Like the Bundestag, it may vote the Chancellor out of office via a constructive vote of no confidence, but only with a two-thirds majority of its members. If a vacancy occurs, it may elect a new Chancellor.

The Bundestag and Bundesrat always retain full authority to act; the Bundestag can at any time reconvene (thus bringing to an end the period during which the Joint Committee is allowed to act), repeal laws that have been passed by the Joint Committee, pass laws themselves, and otherwise its decisions take precedence over those of the Joint Committee in case of doubt. In practice, the committee can only exercise its powers if and as long as the Bundestag is truly not able to meet; it cannot be used to disempower the regular constitutional bodies against their will.

== Appointment ==
The Bundestag appoints 32 of its members according to the size of party groups. Each of the 16 state governments appoints one member who shall also be a member of the Bundesrat and one substitute member. The President of the Bundestag is always a member, representing their party group, and is the chairperson of the Joint Committee. Unlike in the Bundesrat, where states may direct their delegates on how to vote, the representatives in the Joint Committee are not bound by any instructions. Deliberations of the Joint Committee are not public.

== Democratic legitimacy ==
The provision has been criticised for being able to oust the directly elected Bundestag, in a case where the Joint Committee would vote to establish a state of defense and take power. Another concern is the combination of members of the Bundestag and Bundesrat, compromising the federal checks and balances system and the separation of powers.

However, the purpose of the Joint Committee is to ensure a democratically legitimate and functioning legislature even during a state of attack, such as a nuclear war. It is an unusual institution since in many other countries, the constitution simply designates the government (executive) to exercise legislative powers and issue urgent laws during an emergency.

The latter is also a possibility in Germany, according to article 81 of the Constitution ("legislative state of emergency", Gesetzgebungsnotstand), but such laws must also be confirmed by the Bundesrat and the President. Since the establishment of the Federal Republic of Germany, neither a State of Defense, an activation of the Joint Committee nor a legislative state of emergency has occurred.

During a 1989 exercise in the Government bunker, Gertrud Schilling, member of the Joint Committee for The Greens, said that the Joint Committee's function was severely hampered by the fact that it would be cut off from the outside world with all means of communication being controlled by the government.

== Nuclear bunker ==
In case of war, the Joint Committee, along with other federal organs, would have been evacuated to the Government Bunker, a vast underground secret complex 25 km south of Bonn officially called the Evacuational Site of the Constitutional Bodies (Ausweichsitz der Verfassungsorgane). Large exercises were held every second year including mock meetings of the Joint Committee.
