= COVID-19 pandemic in Austria =

- Disease: COVID-19
- Pathogen: SARS-CoV-2
- Location: Austria
- First outbreak: Wuhan, Hubei, China
- Index case: Ischgl
- Arrival date: 8 February 2020 (6 years, 6 months, 2 weeks and 4 days ago)
- Confirmed cases: 6,083,792
- Active cases: 22,331
- Recovered: 589,534
- Deaths: 22,534
- Fatality rate: 1.65%
- Vaccinations: 6,899,873 (total vaccinated); 6,683,263 (fully vaccinated); 20,468,732 (doses administered)

Government website
- Ministry of the Interior (in German)

The COVID-19 pandemic in Austria was a part of the worldwide pandemic of coronavirus disease 2019 (COVID-19) caused by severe acute respiratory syndrome coronavirus 2 (SARS-CoV-2). In Austria, a pair of cases were confirmed on 25 February 2020. The cases involved a 24-year-old man and a 24-year-old woman who were travelling from Lombardy, Italy, and were treated at a hospital in Innsbruck. According to new figures released by Austrian authorities on 23 June, the first case in the country was recorded in Ischgl, Tyrol on 8 February.

As of 4 February 2023, a total of 20,369,447 vaccine doses have been administered.

== Background ==
On 12 January 2020, the World Health Organization (WHO) confirmed that a novel coronavirus was the cause of a respiratory illness in a cluster of people in Wuhan, Hubei, China, which was reported to the WHO on 31 December 2019.

The case fatality ratio for COVID-19 has been much lower than SARS of 2003, but the transmission has been significantly greater, with a significant total death toll.

== Events ==
daily COVID-19-cases of the first four Austrian waves and deaths during those waves

=== 2020 ===
On 25 February, Austria confirmed the first two cases of COVID-19, a 24-year-old man and a 24-year-old woman from Lombardy, Italy tested positive and were treated at a hospital in Innsbruck, Tyrol.

On 27 February, a 72-year-old man in Vienna had been in the Krankenanstalt Rudolfstiftung hospital for 10 days with flu symptoms before he tested positive for SARS-CoV-2. He was then transferred to Kaiser-Franz-Josef Hospital. A couple who tested positive and their two children who were showing symptoms were admitted to Kaiser-Franz-Josef Hospital. The family had previously been on holiday in Lombardy, Italy. On 28 February, one of the children, a 15-year-old boy tested positive. Due to the illness, precautions were taken at his high school as 4 teachers and 23 students born between 2003 and 2005 were sent home for isolation.

Beginning from 1 March, authorities in Germany and the Nordic countries began identifying the Tyrolean ski resort town of Ischgl as a major coronavirus hotspot. Several hundred infections were eventually traced back to the town with transmissions having occurred from late February onwards. After initially playing down the risks, authorities in Tyrol placed the entire town in quarantine on 13 March.

On 10 March, the government announced that all universities would close their classes at the latest by 16 March. All outdoor events with more than 500 people and all indoor events with more than 100 people were cancelled. All children older than 14 years old were ordered to stay at home, starting 15 March, with the younger children starting 17 March. This applied until 4 April. Travel restrictions for people coming from Italy are established. The government asked the general public to avoid social contact and announced even further restrictions to be made soon.

On 12 March, Austria confirmed the first death of COVID-19, a 69-year-old man from Vienna died in Vienna's Kaiser-Franz-Josef Hospital.

By 13 March, there were 422 confirmed cases.

Potential COVID-19 infected persons should under no circumstances go to a doctor or to an outpatient clinic to reduce the risk of infection. They were asked to call the Healthcare number 1450 instead. On 15 March, there were about 70 times as many calls as on other Sundays before the pandemic.

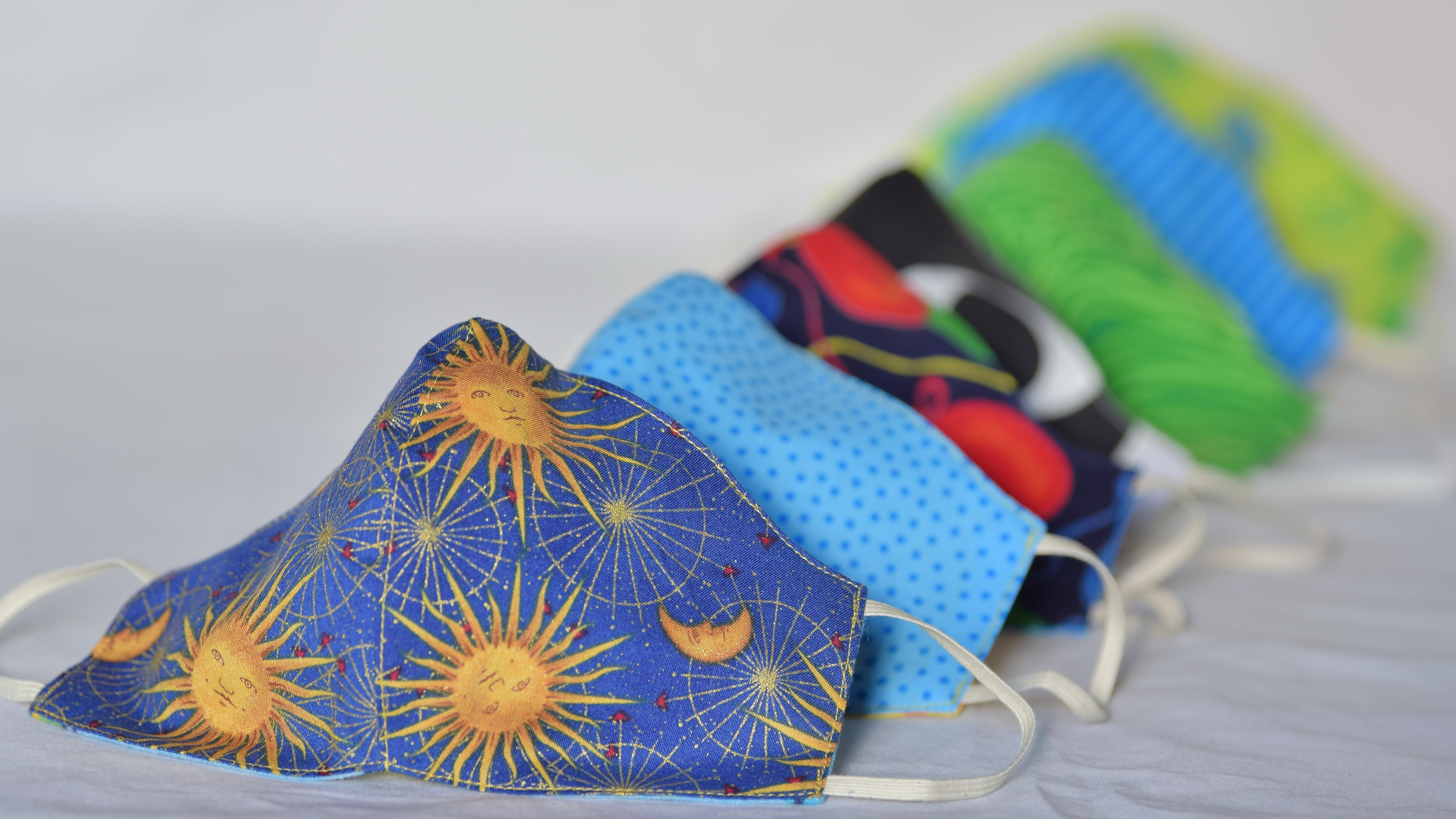
Protective face masks

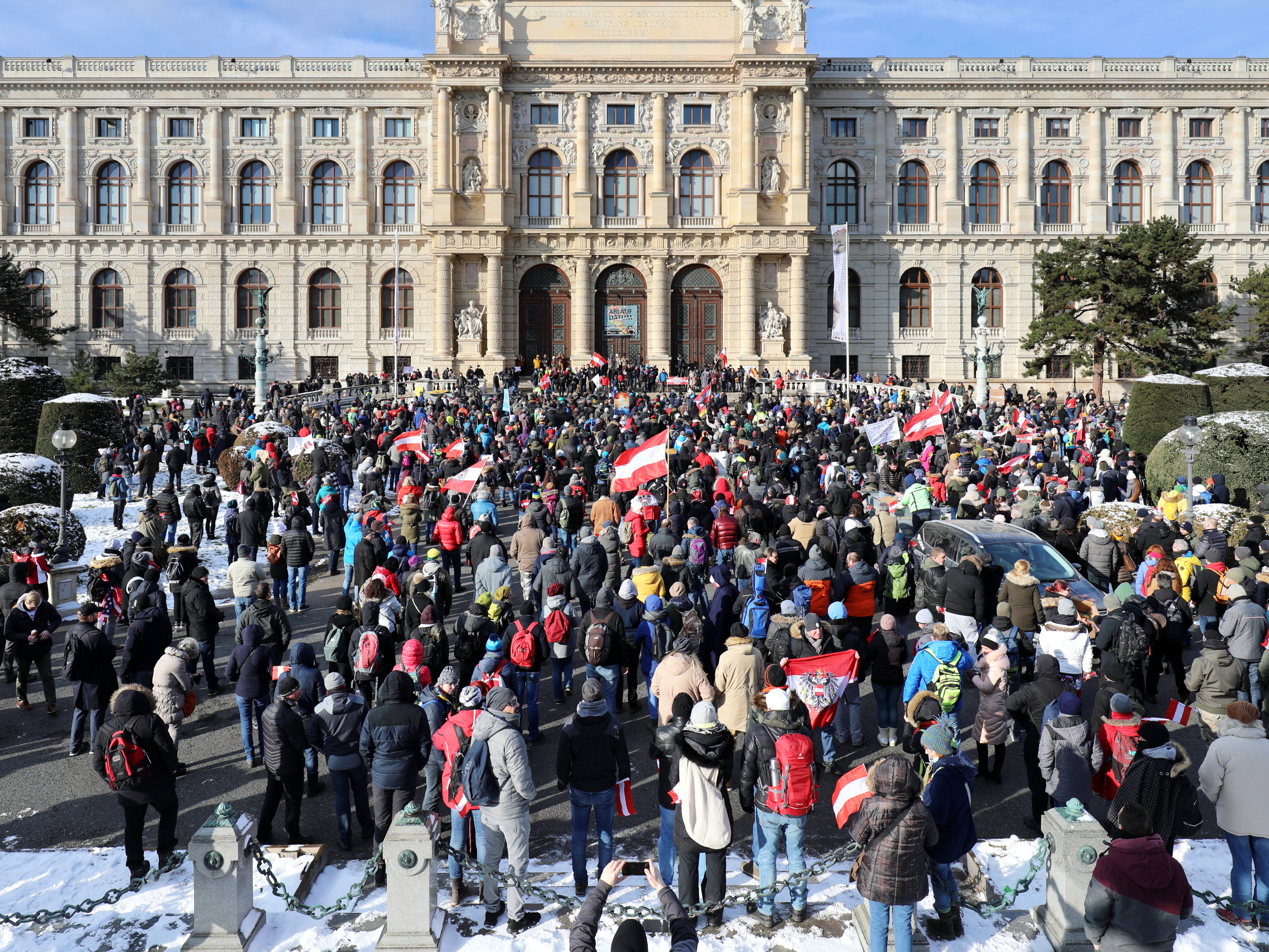
Protest against coronavirus restrictions in Vienna, 2021-01-16

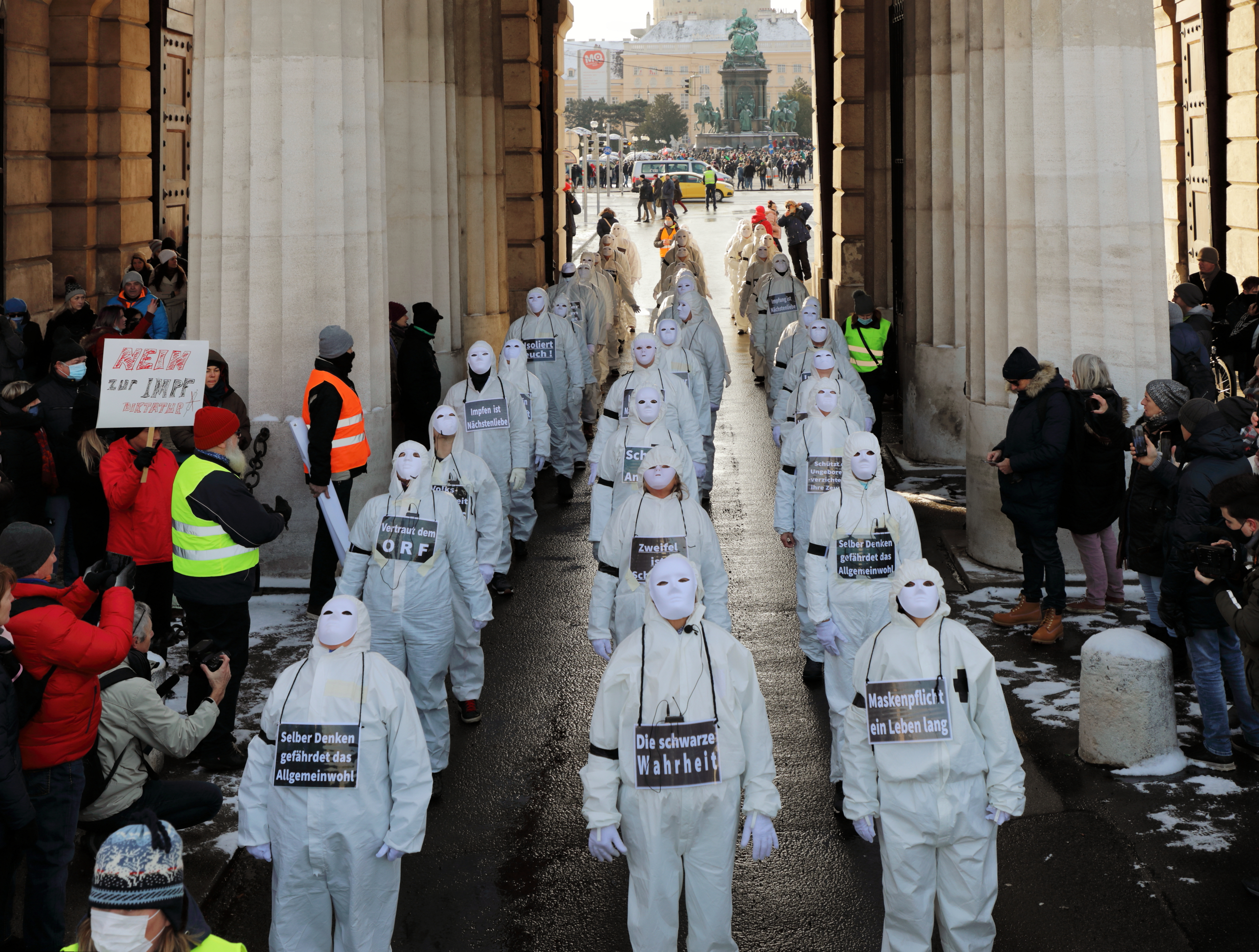
Protest against coronavirus restrictions in Vienna, 2021-01-16

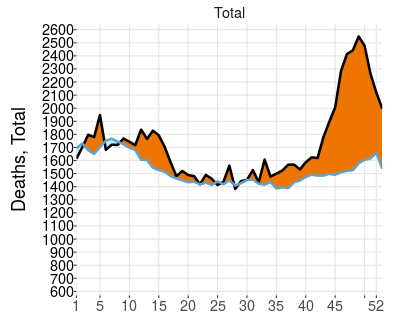
Excess mortality in Austria 2020, by calendar week

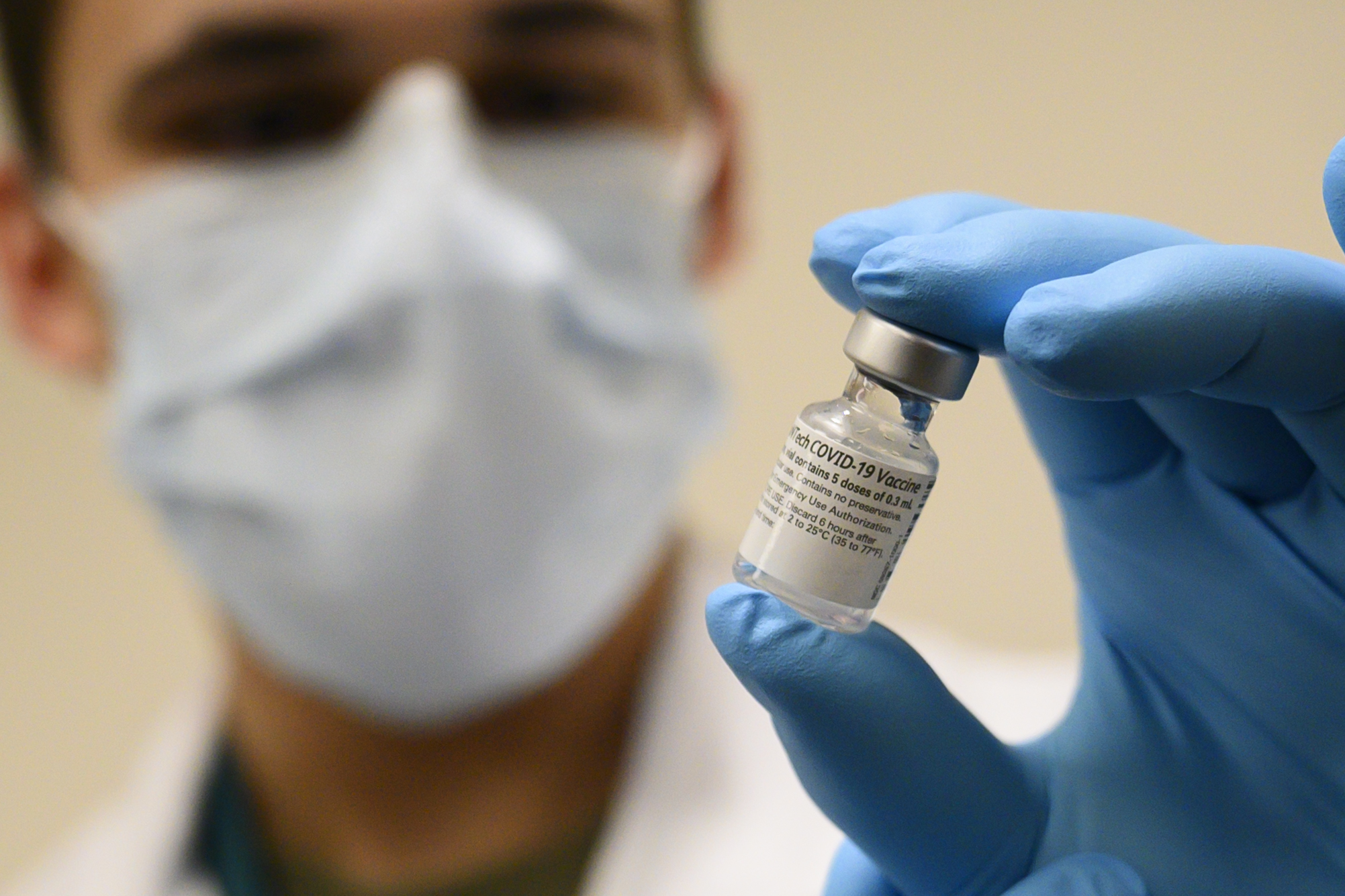
Pfizer-BioNTech COVID-19 vaccine

On 15 March, a ban was also announced for public gatherings of more than five people, and restaurants were ordered to close beginning on 17 March. In addition, Günther Platter, the governor of Tyrol, announced a one-week lockdown for the whole province. Residents in Tyrol were required to remain in their homes except for necessary reasons such as purchasing food or medicine, visiting the doctor, withdrawing cash, or walking a dog.

From 16 March until 20 April, nationwide, homes may only be left for one of the following reasons:

- necessary professional activities
- necessary purchases (groceries or medication)
- assisting other people
- activities outside, alone or in the company of people living in the same household

On 27 March, Federal Minister of Health Rudolf Anschober announced that in Austria the pandemic was expected to peak between mid-April and mid-May 2020.

On 30 March, the Austrian government announced that everyone entering a store has to wear a face mask, effective 6 April.

On 30 March, the Austrian government announced that they would be conducting random tests.

From 1 April to 6 April, the random tests were conducted by the SORA Institute who contacted 2000 randomly selected candidates in regions affected by the virus; 1544 of the candidates were tested. Based on the study, the prevalence of the infection in the non-hospitalized population was recalculated, resulting in an estimate around 0.33%. The results were announced on 10 April.

On 14 April, wearing face masks became mandatory on public transportation as well. At the same time, stores such as retail shops and home improvement stores that are under 400 square metres may already reopen.

On 13 October, results of an investigation into the Ischgl outbreak in March were announced, including conclusions that closing the resort's facilities had been later than desirable and the departure of tourists had not been managed to take place in an orderly manner. When a full lockdown had been announced, thousands of tourists had attempted to leave in a matter of hours. It was hoped that Austria and other countries might "learn from the mistakes of the past".

On 17 November, a second hard lockdown went into effect until (and including) 6 December. The goal is to significantly reduce the number of new cases and to relieve the pressure on hospitals.

In November 2020 the University of Innsbruck conducted a second antibody study in Ischgl. Seroprevalence was found to be still 45.4%. In the first study in April 2020 it was 51.4%. The second COVID wave in Austria end of 2020 could not spread in Ischgl. During the first wave out of the 1600 inhabitants of Ischgls two persons died. Nine were treated in hospital, one at an intensive care unit.

On 26 December, a third hard lockdown went into effect until (and including) 24 January 2021. In between 7-25 December, regulations were relaxed slightly to allow for limited Christmas shopping and limited family gatherings around the Christmas holidays. The goal of the third hard lockdown is to lower the new infection numbers even further.

=== 2021 ===
Starting on Monday, 8 February, the strict lockdown was lifted and retail shops, schools, services providers, museums, parks, zoos etc. are allowed to open again - with heavy protective measures such as mandatory FFP2-mask wearing. Hairdressers and massage therapists are only allowed to serve customers if they provide a negative COVID-test from a licensed medical testing site which is no longer than 48 hours old.

According to preliminary numbers released by Statistics Austria, 90.517 people died in Austria in 2020 - an increase of 8,6% from 2019. Excess mortality, which is defined by significantly higher mortality compared to the previous 5 years, happened during the first wave in March/April and more considerably after October during the second wave. During February 2021, there was no excess mortality in the country any longer with deaths below the 5-year average for the latest calendar weeks 6 and 7.

Until 5 March, 776.397 doses of vaccines have been distributed to Austria. 742.374 of these doses have been used for vaccination: 502.985 of which have been used to vaccinate people with a first dose and another 239.389 people with a second dose. 5,7% of all Austrians have received a first dose of vaccination, with 2,7% fully vaccinated with a second dose.

After four months of a complete shutdown, the gastronomic and cultural sector reopened in Vorarlberg on 15 March 2021 under strict conditions. Vorarlberg had shown low incident rates of Covid infections, so the state served as so-called 'model region' for the reopening of the gastronomic sector.

On November 15, a national lockdown for unvaccinated citizens aged 12 and over was imposed, authorizing them to leave their homes only for work, food shopping, or emergencies. The lockdown was described as temporary.

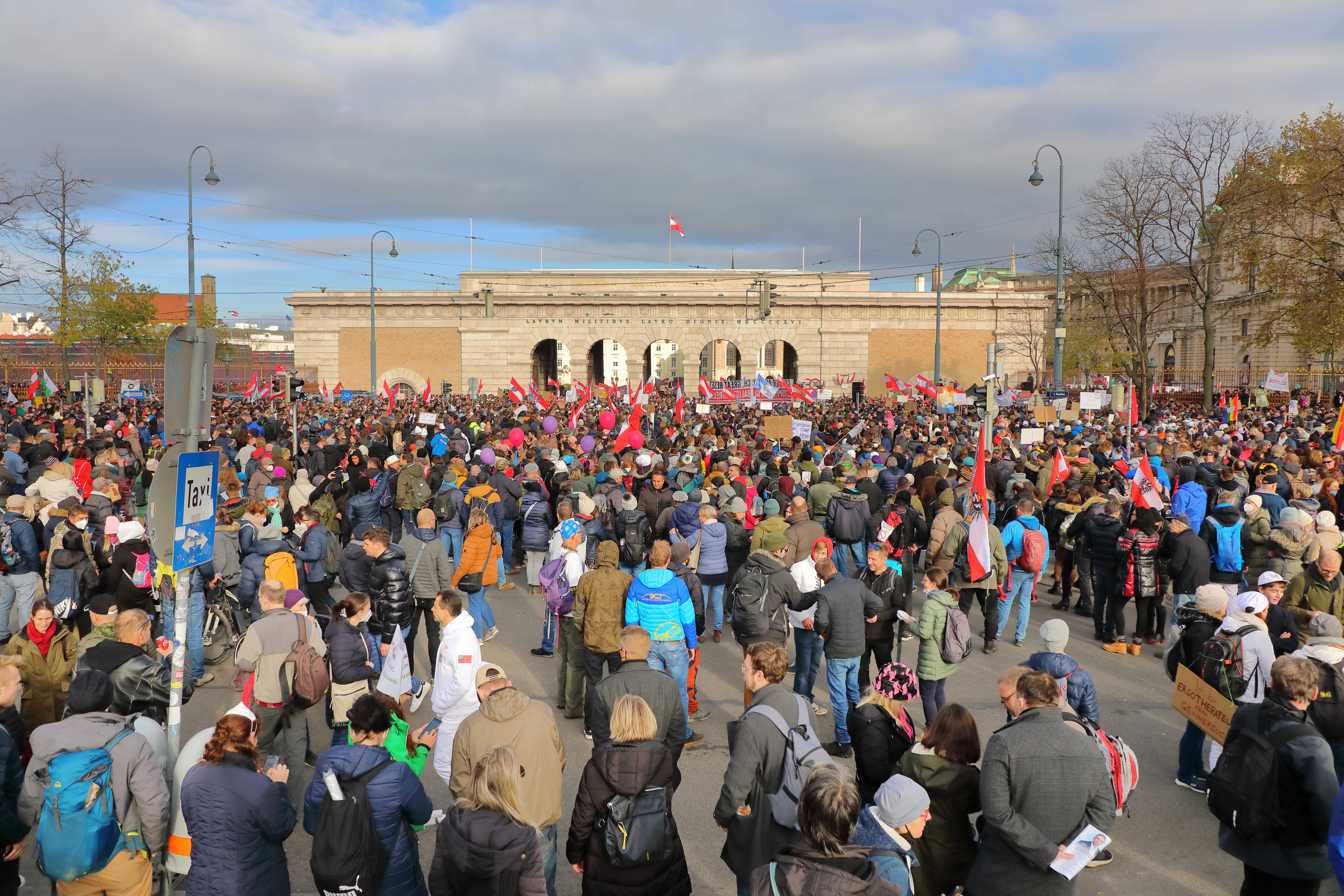
The largest protest against coronavirus restrictions to date on November 20 with official 40,000 participants against the Covid measures - here a section in the area of the Outer Castle Gate (Äußeres Burgtor) in Vienna

On November 19, due to the fourth wave in the country, Austria announced a full national lockdown for all citizens starting on November 22 and lasting for 20 days, including the introduction of a legal requirement for citizens to get vaccinated starting from 1 February 2022. Among the new measures, citizens were required to work from home, non-essential shops were closed, and schools only remained open for children who require face-to-face learning.

During the COVID-19 pandemic, Austria was at the top in adopting new digital technologies and leading the digital transformation in Europe.

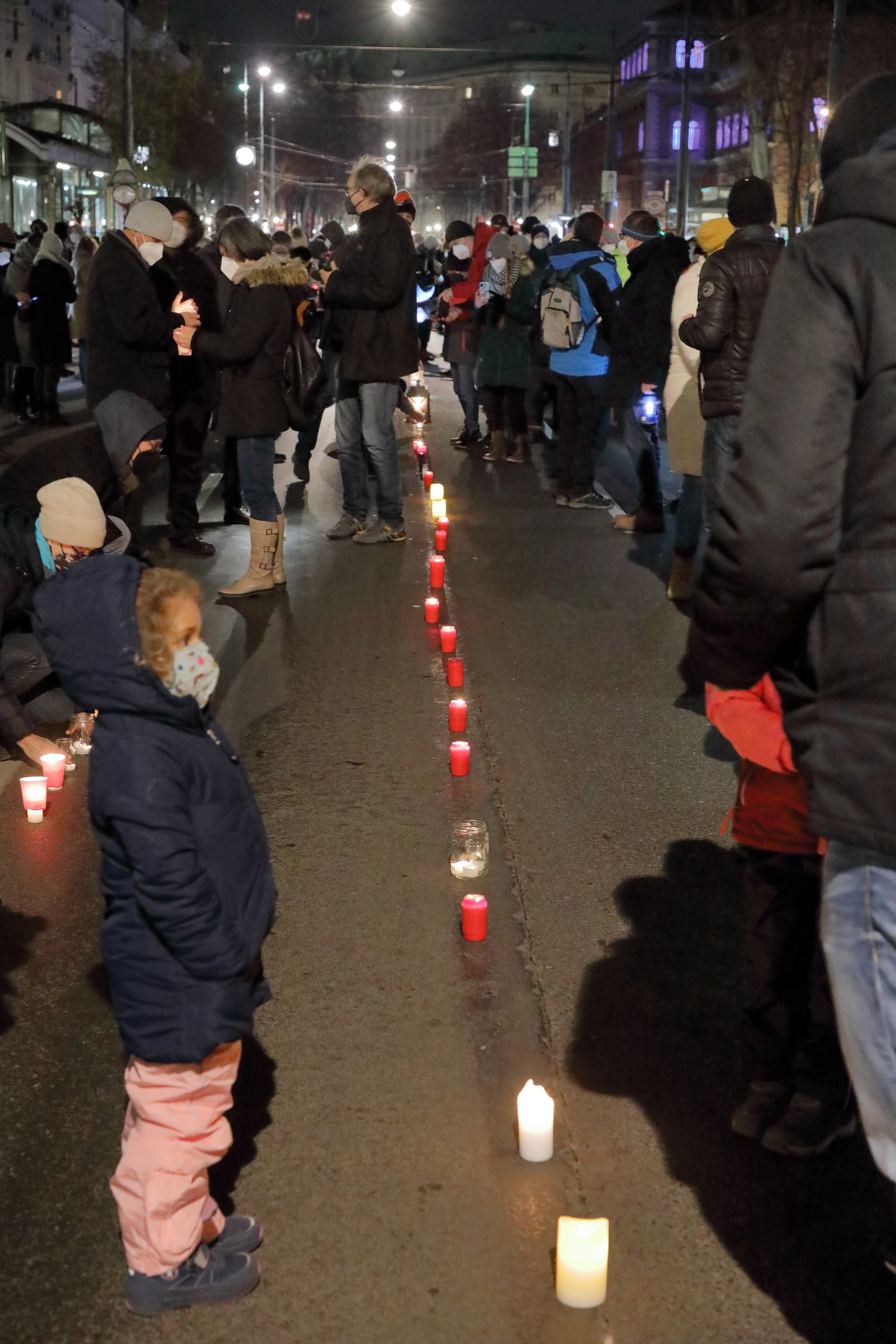
Sea of lights, a memorial event for deaths by COVID-19, on 19 December 2021 in Vienna

=== 2022 ===
On February 16, Chancellor Karl Nehammer announced that the Austrian government would lift most of its remaining COVID-19 restrictions by March 5.

Footage of climate activists in Vienna was falsely asserted to be a video of corpses supposedly dead by COVID-19 moving.

== Timeline ==
Number of cases (blue) and number of deaths (red) on a logarithmic scale.

== Statistics ==
=== Confirmed new cases per day ===
View source data.

=== Confirmed deaths per day ===
View source data.

=== New cases per week ===
View source data.

== Prevention measures ==
On 16 March 2020, a nationwide stay-at-home order went into force. Homes could only be left for a handful of specified reasons, see above. Non essential retail work that could not be done from home was stopped.

On 17 March 2020, in addition to border checks, Austria banned all arrivals from Italy, China's Hubei Province, Iran, and South Korea, excepting those who had a medical certificate no more than four days old that confirmed they were not affected by coronavirus.

On 27 March 2020, it was announced that no further prevention measures were planned.

On 30 March 2020, the government laid out plans to introduce compulsory wearing of face masks covering mouth and nose. From 6 April onwards, this only affected persons entering supermarkets, but was planned to be extended to more public places in the near future.

On 21 May 2020, the Austrian Chancellor Sebastian Kurz stated that tourism is a driving force of the Austrian economy, accounting for about 8% of its GDP and involving hundreds of thousands of employees. He invited German tourists usually directed to Italy to vacation in safer Austria and contextually launched a 40 million Euro international campaign for tourism.

On 23 May 2020, tourists coming from Germany and Switzerland to Italy were allowed to cross Austrian borders, but with the prohibition of any kind of stop within their national area.

On 3 June 2020, the Austrian Foreign Minister Alexander Schallenberg stated that Austria had agreed with Germany, Switzerland, Liechtenstein, Slovenia, Hungary, Slovakia and the Czech Republic that their countries' borders would be reciprocally reopened from 4 June. The agreement doesn't yet affect the borders with Italy.

On 21 July 2020, Austria reintroduced face mask requirements inside supermarkets, banks and post offices. Sebastian Kurz also announced tighter testing requirements for arrivals from the Balkans

On 4 September 2020, the Corona traffic light (Corona-Ampel) officially started operation in Austria. Due to the rising numbers of new infections, Austria's three large cities—Vienna, Linz and Graz—as well as the Tyrolean district of Kufstein lighted up in yellow (medium risk), while in the rest of the country the green light (low risk) had been in effect.

On 19 October, the government announced that starting on 23 October non-work related meetings were limited to 6 people indoors and 12 people outdoors, leaving an exception for funerals.

On 31 October 2020, the government announced "Lockdown light" starting on 3 November 2020. This meant that between 20:00 (8 PM) and 6:00 (AM) leaving the house was only possible in special circumstances, such as protection of life and possessions, helping others, for work and education and for physical and psychological regeneration outdoors.

== Trivia ==
During the COVID-19 pandemic, several special deployments of various institutions and departments took place in Austria:

- for the first time in the history of mandatory alternative service (German: "Zivildienst") in Austria, male citizens have been drafted to "Special Alternative Civilian Service", to assist in the health care system
- for the first time in the history the military reserve of the Austrian Armed Forces, the so-called "Militia", has been activated and soldiers were called up for service to assist in health care and for security reasons
- Employees of the Lower Austrian road maintenance service (German: "Straßenmeisterei") were deployed to support the police service at the border crossings
- Parking enforcement officers of the "Vienna Parking Enforcement Authority" (in German: "Parkraumüberwachungsgruppe / PÜG), known colloquially as "Park Sheriffs", were deployed to police federal parks (German: Bundesgärten) in Vienna
- in March 2020, firefighters were deployed to support the police at border crossings in Vorarlberg

== Protests ==
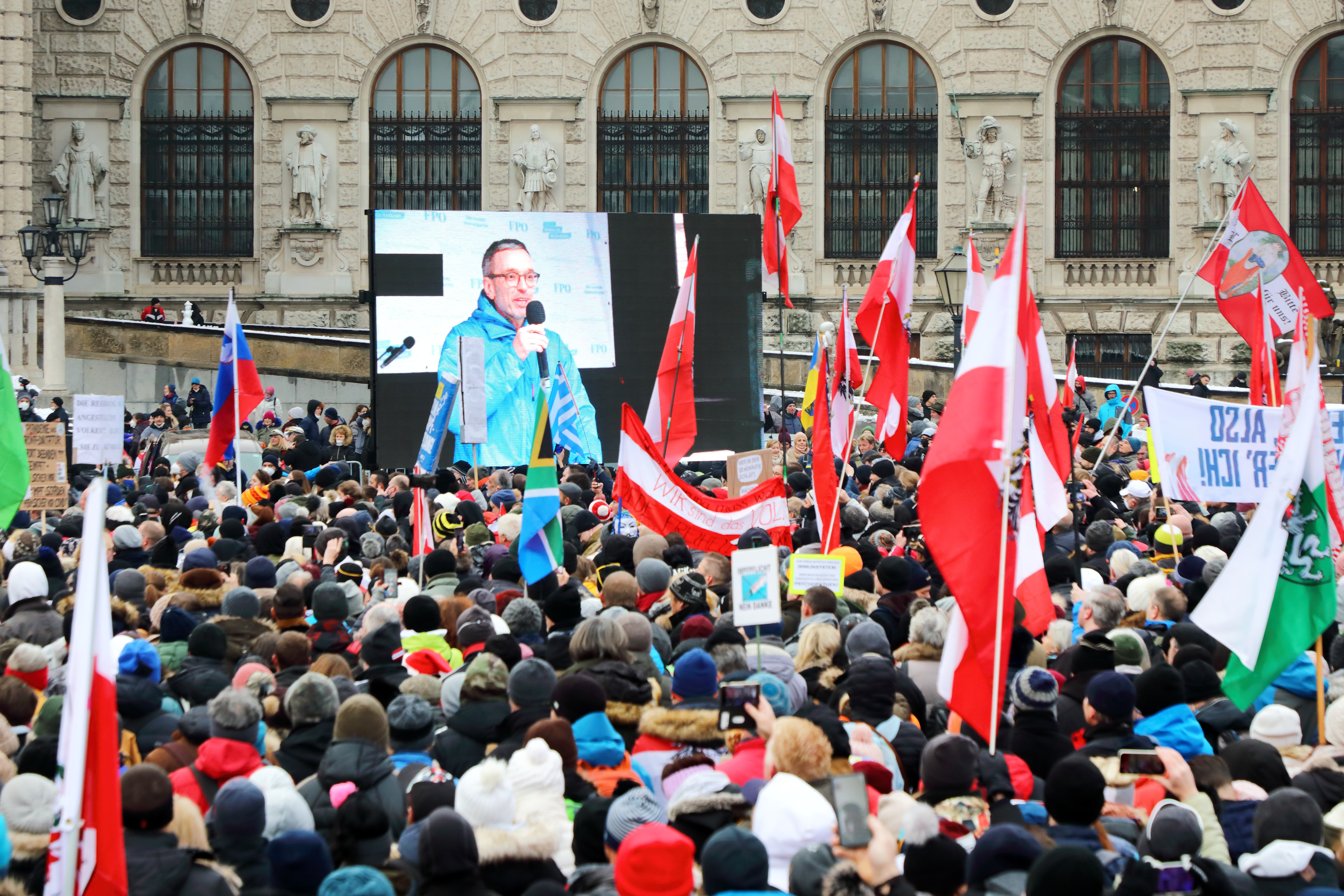
Herbert Kickl leader of Freedom Party of Austria, as speaker at the anti-corona measures demonstration on December 11, 2021, in Vienna

The newly created Fundamental Rights Party (MFG), has been planning recent anti-lockdown protests in Austria. The group compared Covid restrictions with "Nazi rule". The country's third largest political party, the Freedom Party of Austria (FPÖ), has also strongly condemned the Covid restrictions, and its new leader, Herbert Kickl, has pushed misleading and false views of the virus, including claims that the vaccination programme is really a "genetic experiment". Kickl urged a public crowd to reject compulsory vaccinations. Fifteen thousand people later rallied at the Heldenplatz square in Vienna to protest against the anti-Covid measures and were later joined by thousands more, with approximately 44,000 people taking part in the rally in total.

== See also ==
- COVID-19 pandemic in Europe
- COVID-19 pandemic by country and territory
- Lisa-Maria Kellermayr, Austrian doctor who committed suicide after being threatened by anti-vaccination critics
