= Voluntary ecological year =

Educational and orientation year

The voluntary ecological year in Austria and Germany is an educational and orientation year for teenagers and young adults of ages 16 through 27. The voluntary ecological year can be attended only once and usually lasts 12 months (from 1 August to 31 July of the following year).

== Germany ==
=== History ===
In 1998 the Voluntary Ecological Year (in German: Freiwilliges Ökologisches Jahr /FÖJ) was introduced as a model project in various states in Germany. In 2002 the legal bill regarding the Freiwilliges Ökologisches Jahr passed parliamentary procedure and the FÖJ was officially established.

By June 1, 2008 a new legislation is regulating youth voluntary services. Until then, the law promoting a voluntary ecological year was in effect.

From 2002 until the suspension of conscription and therefore the mandatory alternative service in 2011 as well, it was also possible for recognized conscientious objector to do the Voluntary Ecological Year as an alternative service.

=== Mission and structure ===
Today, the Voluntary Ecological Year can be credited as a so-called "waiting term" or "waiting semester" until getting admission to a university. It is financially supported and implemented by the states and individual agencies respectively. The volunteers organize their positions independently in state and federal agencies.

The FÖJ can also be completed abroad, for example in France as the so-called Franco-German Ecological Year. However, the number of positions is very limited and there is a very high demand.

FÖJ sponsors are mostly non-profit youth organizations, such as churches or environmental protection associations. These agencies and organisations take on the selection of the operational areas and the support for the volunteers.

There are currently around 3,000 FÖJ sites in Germany and in addition about 600 positions of the Federal volunteers service for economic protection.

Lists of the FÖJ locations are available from the providers in the respective state.

==== Speaker system ====
The FÖJ has developed a nationally established speaker system. The system is built on a democratic basis. In each state there are different numbers of providers who form the seminar groups with their FÖJ participants. In these seminar groups i. d. As a rule, two group spokespersons are elected, who go to group spokesperson meetings and there elect the state spokespersons (also called federal delegates), who represent the FÖJ in the respective state. Subsequently, all state spokesmen of the 16 federal states of Germany take part in a federal delegates' conference at which five federal spokespersons are elected to represent the FÖJ in Germany and the interests of all FÖJ volunteers in public, the press and politics.

==== Areas of operation ====
Possible areas of experience and work for FÖJers are possible in a variety of areas. For example in the following:

- Agriculture, forestry and horticulture
- Environment related jobs in companies
- Environmental education
- Work in environmental associations
- Engagement in environmental centers, animal welfare and nature conservation centers
- Work in public authorities, in relation with environment
- Food processing
- Scientific environmental protection

==== Volunteers of the FÖJ ====
The number of volunteers is increasing since the period of 2015/2016.

Voluntary Ecological Year volunteers
period	number of female FÖJ volunteers	number of male FÖJ volunteers	percentage of third gender/non-binary/various FÖJ volunteers	number of FÖJ volunteers without gender specification	total number of FÖJ volunteers
2011/2012	1,458	1,102			2,560
2012/2013	1,551	1,137			2,688
2013/2014	1,569	1,208			2,777
2014/2015	1,528	1,272			2,800
2015/2016	1,559	1,127			2,686
2016/2017	1,666	1,115			2,781
2017/2018	1,708	1,287			2,995
2018/2019	1,763	1,186			2,949
2019/2020	1,882	1,253	7		3,142
2020/2021	1,912	1,256	7		3,175
2021/2022	2,082	1,136	40		3,258
2022/2023	1,983	1,217	21	3	3,244
2023/2024	1,933	1,229	69	1	3,232
2024/2025	2,000	1,243	62	3	3,308

==== Seminars ====
The providers of the FÖJ have to organize a minimum of 25 seminar days per year. In the respective seminars, fixed topics such as ecosystems, sustainability or globalization are discussed. These days are usually organized by FÖJ speakers or by self-organization. The participants can also acquire additional qualification modules, such as the modules education or "green jobs".

==== Costs ====
The cost of the FÖJ are defrayed by the providers and partly the states. The volunteers in the Voluntary Ecological Year, who are sometimes still minors, basically consists of monthly pocket money of around €180 to €370 as well as food and accommodation. If food and accommodation is not provided, it is paid out in full or in part. In addition, government grants different sponsorships.

== Austria ==
The Voluntary Ecological Year or also the Voluntary Environmental Year (German: Freiwilliges Umweltjahr / FUJ) in Austria offers young people from 17 years of age the opportunity to get involved in environmental and sustainability issues. The legal background to this is noted in regulation in Sections 22–24 in the Volunteer Act.

It is aimed at young adults who are in a professional orientation phase and are interested in environmental, nature conservation and sustainability topics.

The agencies and providers for the Voluntary Environmental Year are approved by the Minister for Environment. Framework

Due to the existing conscription for military service in Austria, since 2013 the FUJ is an alternative compulsory service to the mandatory service in the Austrian Armed Forces for males.

== See also ==
- Federal volunteers service
- Let's Do It! World
- Voluntary social year
- World Cleanup Day
