= Zivildienst =

Alternative civilian service in Germany

Zivildienst is the German denomination for the alternative civilian service for conscripted persons who are conscientious objectors to fulfill their national service, typically in the fields of social work (e.g. hospitals, retirement homes, emergency medical services) and, although rarely, environmental protection, agriculture, and public administration. As such, it is exempt from the general ban of forced labor by the European Convention on Human Rights.

The word itself is German, translated verbatim to "Civilian Service", although "compulsory community service" is more contextually equivalent. However, the official translation in German is "alternative civilian service" as the civilian branch of the national service systems in Austria and Switzerland. The drafted person to "Zivildienst" is "Zivildiener" in Austria and "Zivildienstleistender" in Switzerland, commonly called "Zivi" in both countries.

== History ==
=== Germany ===
Between 1961 and 2011 "Zivildienst" was available in Germany as well as an alternative service to conscription in the German armed forces. The Federal Office for Alternative Civilian Service (German: Bundesamt für den Zivildienst) was the responsible government office for petitions along with an essay describing their reasons, the applicants had to fill in to become recognized objectors (German: anerkannter Kriegsdienstverweigerer), who then are able to fulfill "Zivildienst". The "recognized objector" could then either negotiate for an accredited service institution or be assigned to an institution. The Zivildienst was the most common alternative service to before conscription was suspended for peacetime in 2011. In total 2,726,636 men served as Zivi until 2011. As a substitute to the "Zivildienst", the voluntary service Bundesfreiwilligendienst (German for "federal volunteers service") was established in 2011.

== Zivildienst in force ==
=== Zivildienst in Austria ===
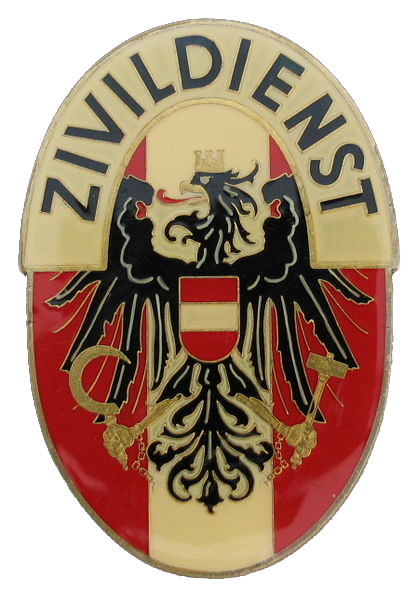
Badge of Zivildienst (Austria, 1982)

In Austria, since 1975 the Zivildienst is provided as an alternative for conscientious objectors to the draft for military service. It is served for nine months, three months longer than the military service. Participants can choose one of several organisations (mainly NGOs) at which to serve. Most popular choices for compulsory service personnel are working for the ambulance services (usually transporting non-emergency patients to and from hospital) and nursing homes. Other options include serving at hospitals, charity organizations, or in several ministries. Because of the upcoming years with a low birth rate, by 2021 the Austrian government will draft every male citizen, without physical or intellectual disability to have the maximum number of men available for "Zivildienst".

=== Zivildienst in Switzerland ===
In Switzerland the Zivildienst / Service civil / Servizio civile was created in 1996 as an civilian substitute service to the military service. It was introduced as part of the so-called Vision 95 (Armeeleitbild 95) reform package. Any man who is unable to do compulsory military service for reasons of conscience can submit an application to be allowed to do substitute civilian service instead.

== See also ==
- Austrian Service Abroad
- Conscientious objector
- Civilian Public Service (during World War II in the USA)
- East German Bausoldat
