= Alternative civilian service =

Alternative to military service in countries with military conscription

Alternative civilian service, also called alternative services, civilian service, non-military service, and substitute service, is a form of national service performed in lieu of military conscription for various reasons, such as conscientious objection, inadequate health, or political reasons. Alternative service usually involves some kind of labor.

== Definition ==
Alternative civilian service is service to a government made as a civilian, particularly such service as an option for conscripted persons who are conscientious objectors and object to military service.

Civilian service is usually performed in the service of non-profit governmental bodies or other institutions. For example, in Austria, men drafted for alternative civilian service mainly serve in healthcare facilities and retirement homes, while other countries have a wider variety of possible placements.

Alternative service is often rejected by antimilitarist conscientious objectors, who still regard it as part of the military system. Many argue that it is not inconveniencing the military in any way, and in fact paints them in a good light. Moreover, in the past non-military service has often freed up people for work in the military, or enabled people to return to the military e.g. nursing. Those conscientious objectors who also reject alternative service are known as absolutists or total objectors.

== History and human rights ==
The Twenty Classes was a program used by the Turkish government during World War II to conscript the male non-Turkish minority population mainly consisting of Armenians, Greeks and Jews. The prevailing and widespread point of view on the matter was that, anticipating entry to World War II, Turkey gathered in advance all unreliable non-Turkish men regarded as a potential "fifth column".

Lack of alternative service in Armenia in 2003–2004 was considered to violate freedom of religion by the European Court of Human Rights in 2011.

== Countries and regions with mandatory alternative service programmes ==
- Austria: Civilian Alternative Service since 1975
- Cyprus
- Estonia
- Finland: Siviilipalvelus established in 1931
- Greece
- Lithuania: Alternatyvioji krašto apsaugos tarnyba
- Russia: Alternative Civilian Service (Russian: альтернативная гражданская служба)
- South Korea: Social Service Agent (Korean: 사회복무요원)
- Switzerland: Swiss Civilian Service since 1992
- Taiwan

== Countries that abolished mandatory alternative services ==
- Germany: Zivildienst, 1961–2011
- Italy: Servizio civile, 1972–2005
- Norway: Siviltjenesten, abolished in 2012
- Russian Empire: Forestry service (Russia)
- Spain: Prestación Social Sustitutoria, 1985–2001
- United States: Alternative Service Program, Civilian Public Service; Selective Service System

== Voluntary services as a substitute to mandatory alternative services ==
- Austria:
  - Austrian Service Abroad instead of Zivildienst
  - European Voluntary Service instead of mandatory civilian service
  - Voluntary ecological year as a substitute to alternative civilian service
  - Voluntary social year instead of the mandatory Zivildienst
- Israel: Sherut Leumi as alternative to mandatory military service
- Italy: Servizio Civile Universale instead of Servizio Civile Nazionale (2005–present day)
- Sweden: Unarmed service (vapenfri tjänst) as an alternative to the otherwise mandatory Värnplikt

== Earlier voluntary services as a substitute to mandatory alternative services ==
- American Friends Service Committee established in the United States during World War I
- International Voluntary Service in the United Kingdom starting in 1939 and during World War II. Later abolished as the UK abolished military service.

== See also ==
- Corvée, ancient form of forced non-military labor by government, similar to alternative civilian service
- Service Civil International
