= Army of the People =

Army of the People may refer to:

- People's Liberation Army Ground Force (China)
- People's Revolutionary Army (Colombia)
- Texian Army
- Ukrainian People's Army
- Provisional Irish Republican Army

== See also ==
- People's Army (disambiguation)
