= Military of China (disambiguation) =

The military of China refers to the People's Liberation Army of the People's Republic of China.

Military of China may also refer to:

- People's Liberation Army Hong Kong Garrison
- People's Liberation Army Macau Garrison
- Republic of China Armed Forces (ROC since 1947, on Taiwan since 1949)
- National Revolutionary Army (national army of China between 1928 and 1947)

== Chinese military before 1912 ==
- Military history of China (pre-1911)
- Military of the Ming dynasty
- Eight Banners
- Green Standard Army

== See also ==
- Chinese Army (disambiguation)
- People's Liberation Army (disambiguation)
