= Chinese Army (disambiguation) =

Chinese Army may refer to:

- People's Liberation Army Ground Force, the land force component of the People's Liberation Army, in the People's Republic of China
- Republic of China Army, in Taiwan
  - National Revolutionary Army, between 1927 and 1947
- Military history of China before 1912

== See also ==
- Chinese military (disambiguation)
- People's Liberation Army (disambiguation)
