= People's Revolutionary Army =

People's Revolutionary Army may refer to:

- People's Revolutionary Army (Argentina)
- People's Revolutionary Army (Colombia)
- People's Revolutionary Army (El Salvador)
- Popular Revolutionary Army (Mexico)
- People's Revolutionary Army (Grenada)
- National Revolutionary Army (China)
- Ukrainian People's Revolutionary Army
- Zimbabwe People's Revolutionary Army

== See also ==
- People's Army (disambiguation)
- People's Liberation Army (disambiguation)
- Revolutionary Armed Forces
