= Conscription in Myanmar =

Conscription in Myanmar was enacted in 2024. The People's Military Service Law, which enables conscription, was written into law in 2010, although it had been practiced as early as 1955.

== History ==
The Tatmadaw — the name traditionally given to the military of Myanmar which has ruled the country intermittently since independence - has long used "forced recruitment" of citizens without formal conscription laws. A 1955 "National Service Bill" was taken to parliament, but due to legal complexities, it is unclear whether it actually entered into force. The main bulk of the military continued to be recruited "almost entirely from volunteers", with the bill's provisions used only for recruitment of "technical specialists, such as doctors and engineers".

However, after the 8888 Uprising in 1988, the Burmese military began utilizing "forced recruitment and deceptive tactics" to quietly enlist young men, including minors, into its forces. This did not occur in accordance with the 1955 bill, and "did not occur pursuant to any compulsory military service laws but was essentially arbitrary", according to a 1988 report by the International Labour Organization of the United Nations. Despite continued manpower shortages, the military did not enact formal mandatory conscription for decades.

On November 4, 2010, the State Peace and Development Council military regime enacted a formalized conscription law, which elicited extremely negative reactions from the public. The military regime soon lost power after the subsequent elections, and the "quasi-civilian governments" that replaced it opted to leave the law unenforced.

In 2021, the Tatmadaw staged a coup d'etat, and established a new military junta known as the State Administration Council, leading to an escalation of Myanmar's long-running internal conflicts into a civil war. Over the following few years, the Tatmadaw suffered numerous military setbacks at the hands of anti-junta insurgent forces, losing control over vast areas of the country. On 10 February 2024, the junta announced that two years of military service would be mandatory for all men between the ages of 18 and 35 and all women between the ages of 18 and 27. Tatmadaw spokesman Zaw Min Tun said that around a fourth of Myanmar's population would be eligible under the law, which was planned to come into effect after the Burmese New Year in mid-April 2024.

The announcement has led to a wave of young people fleeing the country to evade conscription.

As of May 2026, according to data report by Unlawful Conscription Watch (UCW), Mandalay Region recorded the highest number of forced conscription cases nationwide with 9,434 recruits, followed by Rakhine State and Ayeyarwady Region. In Rakhine, the junta forcibly conscripted 3,993 people between May 2025 and May 2026. On 22 July 2026, U Gon Wan, an MP for Hkamti Township, Sagaing Region claimed in the Pyithu Hluttaw that conscription authorities were exceeding weekly quotas by taking youth (including students) from checkpoints, homes, and streets. Deputy Home Affairs Minister, Major General Min Thu, claimed that those detained were draft-dodging, and that recruitment committees were monitored for compliance.
