= Conscription in Mozambique =

Conscription in Mozambique refers to the military service in the Mozambique Defense Armed Forces. It includes a mandatory registration for all male and female citizens at the age of 18 years old. The army then selectively chooses the number of citizens it drafts for a five-year mandatory military service.

== History ==
The mandatory conscription law was passed in 1978 during the Mozambican Civil War (1977–1992) in order to have a stronger governmental military force at the time. RENAMO conscripted also child soldiers to the army during the Civil War.

In 1997, after the transition of Mozambique into a democracy, the law was modified as ''Law of Obligatory Military Service''. The minimum age was set at 18 and the period of recruitment was set for January and February. Also a medical examination was introduced as an obligatory condition for recruitment.

In 2009, the law was amended and now called ''Law of Military Service''. Conscription was not obligatory for all citizens anymore. However, the new law made it mandatory for all citizens between 18 and 35 no matter their gender to register with the military.

In November 2023, the parliament of Mozambique approved a law to extend compulsory military service from two years to five years. One of the reasons was the ongoing Islamist insurgency in the Cabo Delgado region. Defence Minister Cristóvão Chume claimed this step was necessary, as the military "needed to be modern and more professional to be able to face challenges against national security and sovereignty."

== Current situation ==
Mozambican citizens, no matter their gender, have to register with the army when they turn 18 years old. Citizens can be exempt from mandatory military service, if they have health issues, studies or career or government needs. Mozambique doesn't allow soldiers under the age of 18 years old to enlist; it is one of the parties to the multilateral treaty of Optional Protocol on the Involvement of Children in Armed Conflict. However, according to a 1997 law, the minimum age of conscription could be lowered in time of war.

According to Article 20 of the 1997 Military Service Law (Lei do Serviço Militar), individuals eligible for exemption from military service include pre-enlistees who are children or brothers of those deceased due to military obligations, sole dependents of mentally or physically incapacitated parents, and individuals solely responsible for their spouse, ascendant, descendant, sibling, or nephew under 18 years of age. They can obtain exemption by paying an exemption fee.

A selective amount of citizens between the ages of 18 and 35 are summoned by the Mozambican army to do a mandatory 5-year military service. In 1999, one government official, in an interview, stated that only 1,000 young people a year would be called up for military service. This number has increased a lot in recent years: The Mozambican Defense Ministry announced plans to recruit 221,141 individuals aged 18 to 35 for military service in 2024. Of these recruits, 147,114 will be men, with the remainder being women.

== Conscientious objection ==
In 1997, Mozambique recognized the right to conscientious objection to military service for religious reasons in the "Obligatory Military Service Act". This right may temporarily be suspended or restricted in the event of a declaration of a state of war, siege, or emergency, in accordance with the terms of the constitution.

However, other sources claim that conscientious objection is not being recognized. Based on a 2006 UN Commission on Human Rights report Civil and Political Rights, Mozambique, at that time, did not recognize conscientious objection. In 2023, BBC reported that people who refuse to show up to their military service face criminal liability.

There are international calls to grant police officers the right to conscientious objection in situations where they may be forced to commit human rights violations, as well as to exempt individuals from paying taxes that fund military budgets.

== Criticism ==
A 2012 study by a Mozambican youth organisation, Parlamento Juvenil, showed that the conscription process was penetrated with racial and economic discrimination, affecting poor youth disproportionally. These individuals were often unable to avoid conscription by bribing officials.
