= People's Military Service Law =

Law in Myanmar

The People’s Military Service Law (Burmese: မြန်မာနိုင်ငံ၏ ပြည်သူ့စစ်မှုထမ်းဥပဒေ) is a compulsory conscription law enacted by the military junta in Myanmar. Initially drafted in 2010 by the State Peace and Development Council, Myanmar's previous military junta, the law was enforced on February 10, 2024, in response to the ongoing Myanmar civil war.

== Background ==
=== History of conscription in Myanmar ===
Conscription in Myanmar dates back to the mid-1950s, with military leaders initially proposing it due to fears of potential invasions by neighboring countries. The National Service Bill was drafted in 1955 but only taken to parliament to be enacted under the caretaker government of 1958 to 1960, with its enforcement status being unclear.
Before 1988, the military primarily relied on volunteers to replenish its ranks, using the provisions of the National Service Bill to enlist technical specialists like doctors and engineers. Forced recruitment became prevalent after the 8888 Uprising and the military's subsequent expansion. Reports indicated arbitrary recruitment of individuals, including minors, into the Tatmadaw and other militia groups without specific compulsory military service laws.
Despite widespread forced recruitment, the military leadership hesitated to implement mandatory conscription, fearing internal dissent that could threaten the regime. When the conscription law was presented on November 4, 2010, it generated significant public panic and criticism, leading quasi-civilian governments from 2011 to 2021 to delay its enforcement. It wasn't until February 10, 2024, following the 2021 Myanmar coup d'etat and the start of the Myanmar civil war, that the military regime enforced mandatory conscription under the People’s Military Service Law.

=== Civil war since 2021 ===
The mandatory conscription requirement in Myanmar reveals a significant shortage of military personnel, with estimates showing a drastic reduction in junta military forces from around 300,000 to 400,000 pre-civil war to approximately 130,000 by late 2023. False reports and inflated personnel data may have misled junta leadership, leading to a sense of complacency about the military's actual strength and capacity.
The lack of ground troops has compelled the military to cede control over large territories, including key urban regions and strategically vital military installations, marking the most substantial losses in its history. Despite initial reliance on airstrikes and heavy weaponry to compensate for troop shortages, the lack of manpower continued to be a significant demoralizing factor for the military. The success of Operation 1027 and other rebel offensives has led to a sense of urgency in the enforcement of conscription laws.

== Provisions ==
The law targets draft-eligible individuals, including men aged 18 to 35 and women aged 18 to 27, with provisions allowing for the conscription of older individuals classified as "professional" up to the ages of 45, respectively. Penalties are imposed for evasion of military service or aiding others in evading conscription.

== Enforcement ==
According to Tom Andrews, the UN Special Rapporteur on the situation of human rights in Myanmar, young men have allegedly been abducted from the urban areas of Myanmar and coerced into enlisting in the military in recent months. Additionally, reports suggest that villagers have been forced to serve as porters and human shields.
The regime has stated it intends to draft 60,000 men annually via this law.

On 22 July 2026, U Gon Wan, MP for Hkamti Township, Sagaing Region claimed in the Pyithu Hluttaw that conscription authorities were exceeding weekly quotas by taking youth (including students) from checkpoints, homes, and streets. Deputy Home Affairs Minister, Major General Min Thu, claimed that those detained were draft-dodging, and that recruitment committees were monitored for compliance.

== Impact ==
The implementation of mandatory conscription under the People’s Military Service Law has escalated instability in Myanmar and raised alarms about the safety and well-being of civilian populations. The law has intensified calls for international intervention to protect vulnerable communities and prevent further violence and human rights violations in the country. Tom Andrews, the UN Special Rapporteur on the situation of human rights in Myanmar, called it an attack on civilian rights in the country.

=== Exodus ===
As a result of the enforcement of the law, thousands of young people have begun to flee the country to avoid being taken in for mandatory conscription. Deutsche Welle also reported that "thousands" of young people were fleeing across the border to Thailand to evade conscription

=== Retaliation ===
In response to the enactment of the law by the junta in Myanmar, there has been a surge in retaliatory attacks against local officials involved in carrying out conscription efforts. Rebel officials and residents report that at least 17 officials had been killed since the draft law was implemented in early March, as per March 27, with the number of killings tripling in just one week. That number grew to at least 37 local officials by April 13 of 2024.

==== List of retaliatory incidents ====
- February 20, 2024: Administrator Nan Win from Shin Thabyay Pin village in Magway’s Taungdwingyi Township found dead, allegedly killed by anti-junta People’s Defense Force members for pressuring residents to join military training.
- March 18, 2024: Administrator Myint Htoo of Pu Khat Taing village in Magway’s Salin township shot and killed by Salin Township PDF members as he called on residents to enlist for military service.
- March 19, 2024: Administrator Maung Pu of Wundwin Township in Mandalay region killed by unidentified attackers while recruiting soldiers for the junta.
- March 20, 2024: Administrative officer Tin Win Khaing and clerk San Naing of Oke Shit Kone village in Magway’s Yenangyaung Township killed.
- March 22 and 24, 2024: Junior clerk Mya Mye Nyein and administrator Nan Nwe Oo of Sagaing’s Shwebo township shot dead by guerrilla group Shwebo Ar Mann.
- March 24, 2024: Administrator San Lwin of Taung Ka Lay village in Mon’s Kyaikhto Township shot dead by anti-junta Kyaikhto Revolution Force members.

Additionally, numerous buildings used by the Junta to recruit people have been burned down under mysterious circumstances, especially in the Hinthada and Yegyi townships. Rebel forces warned administrators not to enforce the law, and as a result numerous administrators have resigned, citing the impossibility of their duties. 21 administrators in Rakhine’s Thandwe Township collectively resigned, more than a third of Thandwe's 62 village administrators. Similar resignations have taken place in Thanlyin and Sanchaung townships in Yangon Region, and in the Bago Region.
