= People's Army =

People's Army/Armed Forces is/was the title of the armed forces or army of several countries:

- Albanian People's Army
- Algerian People's National Armed Forces
- Bulgarian People's Army
- Czechoslovak People's Army
- Hungarian People's Army
- Korean People's Army, North Korea
- Lao People's Armed Forces
- Mongolian People's Army
- National People's Army of East Germany
- People's Army of Catalonia
- People's Army of Poland
- Pyithu Tatmadaw (People's Armed Forces), Myanmar Tatmadaw during socialist period.
- People's Army of the Republic of Spain
- People's Army of Vietnam
- People's Liberation Army of China
- Romanian People's Army
- South Sudan People's Defence Forces
- Ukrainian People's Army
- Yugoslav People's Army

It is or was also the title used by various militias and rebel groups:

- Catalan People's Army – A Catalan nationalist paramilitary group during the 1970s.
- People's Army Against the Japanese – A socialist guerilla movement that fought against the Empire of Japan during World War II.
- New People's Army – a Maoist insurgent group in the Philippines.
- People's Army of Burma – armed wing of the Communist Party of Burma
- People's Army of Komuch – officially the People's Army of the Committee of Members of the Constituent Assembly (Russian: Народная армия КОМУЧа) - an anti-Bolshevik army during the Russian Civil War, which fought at June–September 1918 in Volga Region.
- People's Army for the Restoration of Democracy (CAR) – a rebel group operating in the northwest Central African Republic
- People's Army for the Restoration of the Republic and Democracy – another rebel group operating in the northwest Central African Republic
- People's Volunteer Army – an armed force deployed by the People's Republic of China during the Korean War.
- Uganda People's Army – a rebel group that opposed the government of Yoweri Museveni.
- Volkssturm (People's Storm) – the German national militia of the last months of World War II.
- People's Army (Syria) – militia of the Ba'ath Party in Syria, founded in 1963.

The People's Army Model refers to a school of thought concerning the role of the Israel Defense Forces in Israeli society.

== See also ==
- People's Liberation Army (disambiguation)
- People's Revolutionary Army (disambiguation)
- Jana Sena Party (India), political party
