= Conscription in Georgia =

History and current situation of Georgia's conscription

Conscription in Georgia applies to male citizens aged 18 to 27, who need to serve the Georgia Defence Forces for a period of 12 months.

== History ==
As defined by the Constitution of Georgia, military service is a universal "duty of all capable citizens of the country." In 1997, the Law on Conscription and Military Service was established, forming the basis of male citizens' universal obligation to military service. This service includes four stages: registration, preparation, urgent military service, and service in a reserve unit. In 2003, the reforms introduced a "military tax," which allowed enlistees to delay service by paying a corresponding tax. In 2015, Chapters 29 and 30 of the military law granted exemptions to certain citizens, including those already serving another country, the only son in a family where at least one member has been killed in the struggle for Georgia's territorial integrity or during military service, members of the Parliament of Georgia. Students, priests, and teachers and doctors in villages can defer entrance to service. On June 27, 2016, the Georgian Minister of Defense signed an order abolishing compulsory military service, transitioning to an armed forces system solely based on voluntary recruitment and contract-based service. Conscription was reinstated later that year after consultations with international experts, and the military tax was increased from $3 to $21 per month.

== Current situation ==
Currently, conscription constitutes more than 20% of Georgia's defense force. The changes of law in 2024 abolished the exemptions for students, who are required to participate in a one-month basic training course during the summer holidays. Only a one-time deferral of one year is possible, with the fee for deferring call-up being around 3,500 euros, while the average household income in Georgia is around 500 euros. Moreover, priest's exemption from military service is also abolished in 2024.

== Conscientious objection ==
According to the 2023 EBCO report, the libertarian political party, Girchi Party, that opposes conscription, had founded a religious association and issued certificates to young men as priests to help them avoid compulsory military service. This practice was stopped by the new code in 2024. The 2024 law has also made the process for conscientious objection more complicated. Under the new law, civilians who refuse military service due to conscience, thought, or religion can perform alternative civilian service in peacetime. The state commission, in coordination with civil organizations, determines the nature and place of such service, which includes roles in emergency services, the environmental sector, construction, agriculture, and social services.

Despite the abolishment of exemption for priest, the 2002 Constitutional Agreement between the Georgian state and the Orthodox Church still grants exemption privileges exclusively to Orthodox priests.

== Criticism ==
Despite the introduction of alternative civilian service, its implementation has been lacking. There is no clear record of deployment locations or statistics on community service participants. To date, there have been no known cases of criminal proceedings against objectors applying for community service. The new conscription system will also put the priests belonging to the Georgian Orthodox Church in a privileged position by omission.

On March 11, 2023, the Girchi Party organized a large-scale public protest against the government's attempts to expand conscription.
