= Compulsion =

Compulsion, compulsive, compelling, or compulsory may refer to:

== Psychology ==
- Compulsive behavior, a psychological condition in which a person does a behavior compulsively, having an overwhelming feeling that they must do so.
- Obsessive–compulsive disorder, a mental disorder characterized by intrusive thoughts that produce anxiety and by repetitive behaviors aimed at reducing that anxiety.

== Film and television ==
- Compulsion (1959 film), an American film based on Meyer Levin's novel (see below)
- Compulsion (2009 film), a British television drama inspired by the Jacobean tragedy The Changeling
- Compulsion (2013 film), a Canadian thriller directed by Egidio Coccimiglio
- Compulsion (2016 film), an erotic thriller film directed by Craig Goodwill
- Compulsion (2024 film), a British thriller film directed by Neil Marshall
- "Compulsion" (CSI), a 2005 TV episode
- Compulsions, a 2009 American web series

== Literature ==
- Compulsion (Hutson novel), a 2001 horror novel by Shaun Hutson
- Compulsion (Levin novel), a 1956 novel and 1957 adapted play by Meyer Levin
  - Compulsion, a 2010 play about Levin, by Rinne Groff
- Compulsion, a 2008 Alex Delaware novel by Jonathan Kellerman
- "Compulsive", a storyline in the science fiction comedy webtoon series Live with Yourself!

== Music ==
- Compulsion (band), a 1990–1997 Irish punk rock band
- Compulsion (album), by Andrew Hill, 1966
- "Compulsion", a song by Joe Crow, covered by Martin Gore on Counterfeit EP, 1989
- "Compulsion", a song by Röyksopp from The Inevitable End, 2014

== Video games ==
- Compulsion Games, a Canadian video game developer

== See also ==
- Authority – power to carry out compulsion
