= Conscription in Egypt =

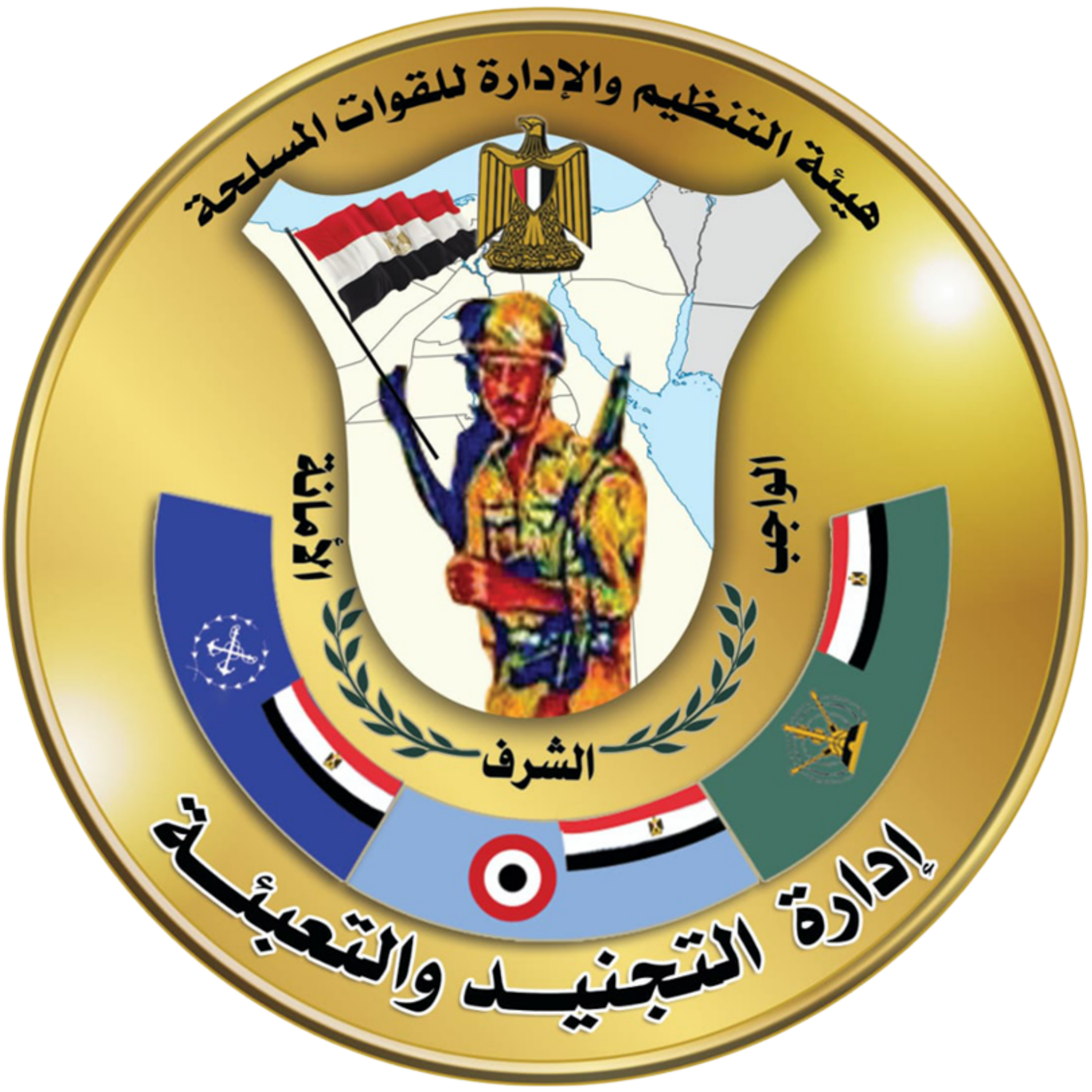
Logo of the Recruitment and Mobilization Department of the Egyptian Armed Forces

Conscription in Egypt (Egyptian Arabic: التجنيد, romanized: at-tagnīd) is a form of a compulsory military service in Egypt. Conscription is compulsory in Egypt for males of ages between 18 and 30.

== Overview ==
Conscription has been in force in Egypt in some form since the 1840s. The present conscription system is based on the National Conscription Law of 1948, which was further amended in 1955, 1957, 1969, and 1988. The service obligation is between 12 and 36 months, depending on their educational backgrounds, culture, drop-outs, etc. followed by a 9-year reserve obligation.

Service is postponed for students until their studies are finished, before they turn 25 years old and they cannot travel abroad without a travel permit from the Ministry of Defense.

Egyptian males with a male sibling can be conscripted. However, Egyptian males without male siblings are not.

Males cannot be enlisted after the age of 30 because they are considered unfit for the service.

A conscript can be enlisted in one of the various arms and branches of the Egyptian Army, the Egyptian Air Defence Forces or the Egyptian Navy. A limited number of conscripts can join as ground/base staff in the Air Force. Those men who do not qualify for selection in any of the armed forces branches are required to do their service obligation in the Central Security Forces for a 36-month period.

College graduates are offered opportunities to remain after the obligation period (12 months), and they are positioned in special ranks amongst the other conscripts.

== See also ==
- Egyptian Armed Forces
