= Economic conscription =

Economic conscription is the mechanisms for recruitment of personnel for the armed forces through the use of economic conditions, particularly when geographical areas within a country are neglected in terms of their economic development, leading to a situation where a high proportion of young people consider a career within the armed forces as an attractive career choice; the premise is that if these areas enjoyed favourable conditions, this would not be the case, and that governments using this mechanism know this, and choose not to change the situation.

== Claim and counter-claim ==
The term is usually used in a pejorative sense, with critics claiming that the government could create conditions where joining the armed forces would not be seen as an attractive career choice, but choose not to in order to avoid resourcing problems for their armed forces. Governments in countries at which the charge of using this method is levelled counter that they are providing work for people who would otherwise not have any.

== Example countries ==
Countries which have been described as practising economic conscription include the United States and the United Kingdom. In both cases the armed forces contain sections whose purpose is to recruit new personnel.

=== United Kingdom ===
In the United Kingdom, these units often recruit through the use of "careers fairs" in areas of high unemployment. In Wales, it has been claimed by Plaid Cymru that "the army is targeting schools in some of the poorest areas of Wales to find new recruits".

=== United States ===
In the US, teams of staff from these units visit poor neighbourhoods, particularly in southern states and other areas with a high African-American population, promoting membership of the armed forces. In both cases, the financial rewards of joining up are used as a central part of the "sales package" — continued use of these tactics in poor areas proves sufficiently successful in attracting a high level of new recruits.

== History of the term ==
The term was in use as early as 1915.
