= People's Revolutionary Army (Colombia) =

People's Revolutionary Army Ejército Revolucionario del Pueblo
- Flag of the ERP
- Leader: Édgar Castellanos
- Dates active: 1985–2007
- Headquarters: "Mountains of Colombia"
- Active regions: Colombia
- Ideology: Marxism
- Wars: the Colombian armed conflict

The People's Revolutionary Army (Spanish: Ejército Revolucionario del Pueblo, ERP) was a small Marxist guerrilla organization in Colombia. The group originated in the municipality of Venadillo, Tolima Department in 1985 as a splinter group of the National Liberation Army and was commanded by its founder Édgar Castellanos, a.k.a. "Gonzalo" until his death in January 2007. The group became a military objective of paramilitary. The Colombian government outlawed the group for rebellion, kidnappings and extortion crimes.

It operated mostly in the vicinity of the city of Ibagué capital of the Tolima Department and in the mountainous area of the Montes de María in the Colombian Caribbean region, between the departments of Sucre and Bolívar which demobilized in June, 2007. The ERP lost its marxist political background with the years and concentrated on criminal practices such as kidnappings and extortion and went down on the number of members to end up with 14 guerrillas which demobilized on September 15, 2007.
