= The People's Army Model =

Israeli army doctrine

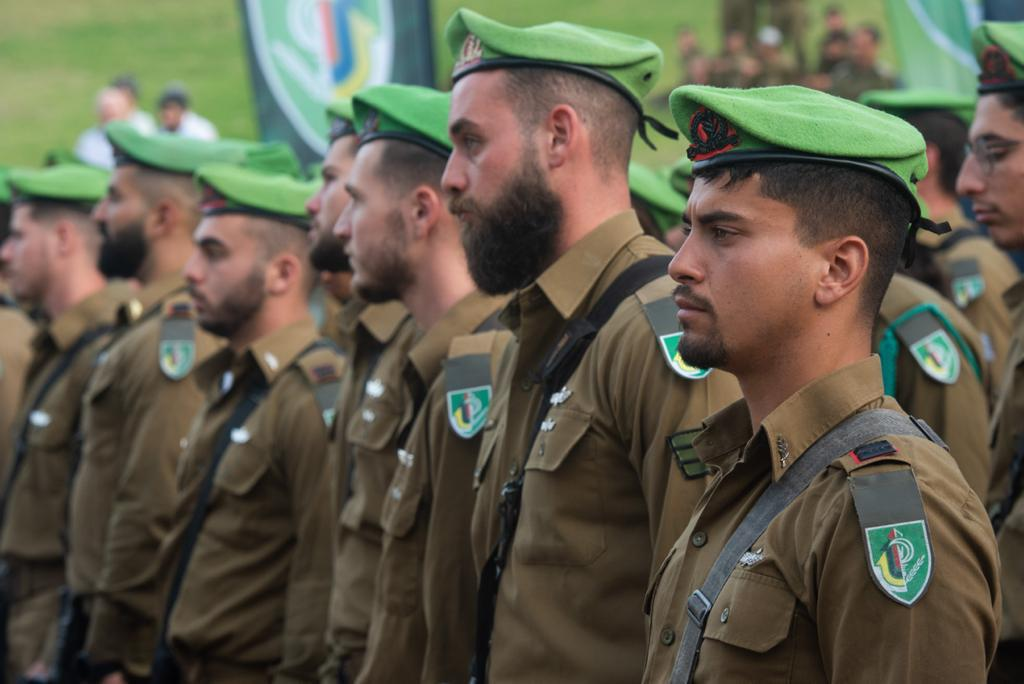
Nahal Brigade soldiers

The People's Army Model (Hebrew: מודל צבא העם; Model Tzva Ha'Am) is a school of thought in Israel concerning the role of the Israeli Army, the IDF, vis-à-vis Israeli society. According to this conception, the IDF plays a broader role than merely defending Israel's national security. Israel's regular army is relatively small, and thus its strength in emergency is based on reservists, which comprise much of the entire nation. Following the Suez Crisis, the Israeli newspaper Davar published the following: "Our army is, as is well known, the people's army, an army of reserves, the laborer and the clerk, [as] the laborer and the teacher had one day laid down their daily work and stabilized the flag".

== History of the Model ==
The model is based on David Ben Gurion’s belief that the universality that would derive from this “melting pot” ideal would help create cohesion among members of society, regardless of their backgrounds; this would serve as both a builder of national identity after the establishment of the state, bringing together people of different socioeconomic backgrounds and racial identities.

There is also the idea that the IDF is by the people, for the people. The IDF allow soldiers to go home often and also allows regular communication with the “outside world.” After an initial training period, the formality commonly associated with military service dissipates, which serves as a tool to promote this ideal.

One of the initial goals of the People's Army Model is to serve as an apolitical, strong force; in theory, it is the best functioning government institution.

== Movement away from the Model ==
With fewer large wars, fewer people are needed to serve at any given time. Additionally, reserves are no longer compulsory anymore. There are also fewer and more divisive career paths emerging with the modernization of the army.

The melting pot ideal that served as the basis for the model has also begun to dissipate as a strong tie with socioeconomic status and racial identity serves as a mediating factor in army service. The availability of training courses towards certain more elite brigades has affected the authenticity of the “for the people” element of the army.

There is also debate within the country on the definition of the term "People's Army," because this suggests a similar intention to serve; however, there is a modern day divide among those serving to ensure that Israel maintains its status as a military powerhouse, and others who serve because it maintains a sense of Zionism.

=== Service exemptions ===
Those exempt from service also affect the demographics of those who serve in the army; they are usually for medical or religious reasonings and limit the country's national representation.
