= People's Liberation Army (disambiguation) =

The People's Liberation Army is the military wing of the Chinese Communist Party and the principal armed forces of the People's Republic of China. It may also refer to:

== Africa ==
- Ambazonia Defence Forces (ADF) is the people’s army of Ambazonia, former British Southern Cameroons fighting a self defense campaign to restore independence.
- Azanian People's Liberation Army, the armed wing of the Pan Africanist Congress of Azania during the Apartheid years
- People's Liberation Army of Namibia, the armed forces of SWAPO during the Namibian national liberation struggle
- Sahrawi People's Liberation Army, the army of the Sahrawi Arab Democratic Republic and the armed wing of the Polisario Front that also struggles for national liberation
- South Sudan People's Defence Forces (formerly the Sudan People's Liberation Army), the armed forces of the South Sudan.

== Asia ==
- People's Liberation Army (Myanmar), armed wing of the Communist Party of Burma
- People's Liberation Army of Kurdistan (ARGK), former armed wing of the Kurdistan Workers' Party (PKK)
- People's Liberation Army, Nepal, the armed wing of the Communist Party of Nepal (Maoist)
- People's Liberation Army of Manipur, separatist armed group fighting for an independent state of Manipur, a state in northeastern India
- Pathet Lao, officially called the Lao People's Liberation Army starting in 1965
- People's Liberation Guerrilla Army (India), the armed wing of the Communist Party of India (Maoist)
- People's Liberation Army of Turkey (THKO), a defunct left-wing group founded in 1970. Several splinter-groups have used versions of the name:
  - People's Liberation Army of Turkey – United Struggle
  - People's Liberation Army of Turkey – Revolutionary Path of Turkey

=== Middle East ===
- People's Liberation Army (Lebanon), the armed wing of the Progressive Socialist Party (PSP)

== Europe ==
- Irish National Liberation Army, sometimes went under the name of People's Liberation Army
- Yugoslav Partisans (officially known simply as the "People's Liberation Army and Partisan Detachments of Yugoslavia"), the anti-fascist resistance army in Yugoslavia, led by Josip Broz Tito
- ELAS (abbreviation of Greek People's Liberation Army), the anti-fascist resistance army in Greece
- Macedonian Partisans, (officially known simply as the "National Liberation Army and Partisan Detachments of Macedonia"), the defunct communist and antifascist resistance movement in Macedonia

== South America ==
- Popular Liberation Army, the armed wing of the Communist Party of Colombia (Marxist–Leninist)

== See also ==
- People's Army (disambiguation)
- People's Revolutionary Army (disambiguation)
