= Civil defense of the GDR =

Defunct German defense organization

Flag of the Zivilverteidigung

Coat of arms of the Zivilverteidigung

The Civil defense of the GDR (German: Zivilverteidigung der DDR) was a civil defense organization of the German Democratic Republic from 1976 to 1990. Its purpose was for the protection of the population, the economy, vital facilities and cultural values against the consequences of disasters and accidents. In the event of war, it should also serve to protect its own population from military operations.

== History ==
The beginnings of civil defense in Germany go back to considerations after the First World War that the democratic constitutional state must be defended in peacetime and should include the non-military part of defense. It was possible to build on experience in disaster protection. In addition, the knowledge gained during the Second World War from air raid protection, fire services, medical services, etc. was incorporated. In conjunction with other measures to protect the population of the GDR, the creation of institutions and management structures to combat disasters began in the 1950s.

Members of the civil defense were trained at appropriate "district schools ZV". In addition, the GDR Civil Defense Institute existed in Beeskow as the highest teaching institution for GDR civil defense. In 1979, the institute received university status. The last commander of the institute was Major General Albert Pankau. At universities and technical schools in the GDR, knowledge and skills for carrying out civil defense tasks were imparted as part of vocational training. Civil defense was part of military instruction at the polytechnic and extended high schools. Special platoons and squads were formed in the fire department, but these were separated from the fire department in 1956.

The Active Fire Protection Administration was created at the departmental level in the Ministry of the Interior (MdI). Working groups have been set up at district council level. The senior officials received appropriate training at the Soviet Union's air defense training institutions. On 11 February 1958, the Volkskammer passed the Air Raid Protection Act as the basis for later civil defense. In the period that followed, air defense staffs and operational groups were formed in the ministries, the councils of the districts, districts, municipalities, and economically important companies and institutions. The aim was to set up a warning system, set up air raid formations, create reserves to supply the population and create shelters.

The Civil Defense Act of 16 September 1970 was intended to take into account the increased demands for protecting the population and securing vital areas, even in the event of war. Accordingly, the following civil defense forces were set up: rescue, recovery, repair, detoxification, medical, supply, reconnaissance and equipment formations as well as special facilities for sanitary treatment and deactivation, first medical aid groups, and observation points. The formations were divided into platoons, groups, departments, standby teams and emergency force staffs.

== Leadership ==
Rank, name	Period of service	Role
Generaloberst Fritz Peter	1976–1990	Head of civil defense in the GDR
Generalmajor Rudi Schütz	1978–1986	Deputy Head and Chief of Staff
Generalmajor Werner Zaroba	1986–1990	Deputy Head and Chief of Staff
Generalmajor Rolf Fischer	1976–1990	Deputy Head and Chief of Civil and Economic Protection
Generalmajor Klaus Rude	1978–1990	Deputy Head and Chief Training
Generalmajor Kurt Sommer	1977–1990	Deputy Head and Head of Political Administration

== See also ==
- Civil conscription
