= Conscription in France =

France was the first modern nation state to introduce universal military conscription as a condition of citizenship. This was done in order to provide manpower for the country's military at the time of the French Revolution (1789–1799). Conscription in France continued in various forms for the next two centuries, until being phased out from 1997 to 2001.

== History ==
=== Origins ===
The French Royal Army of the 17th and 18th centuries had consisted primarily of long-service regulars together with a number of regiments recruited from Swiss, German, Irish and other foreign nationalities. Limited conscription for local militia units was widely resented and only enforced in times of emergency.

Universal conscription in the modern sense originated during the French Revolution, when the newly created Republic needed stronger military forces, initially to defend the country against counter-revolutionary invasion and subsequently to expand its radical ideas throughout Europe. In contrast to the former royal army this was not to be a force of professional soldiers serving for pay, but an army of citizen soldiers enlisted from both volunteers and conscripts. This Levée en masse was to be formed by all young unmarried males. The 1798 Jourdan law stated: "Any Frenchman is a soldier and owes himself to the defence of the nation".

This previously unheard of policy of organised mass conscription allowed the French Republic to fight simultaneously against multiple invading armies, while also suppressing insurrections inside France itself (e.g. Vendée Uprising). This army was also characterised by an unprecedented possibility of upward mobility, as in contrast to the widespread practice in other European armies of the period, promotion was based primarily on merit. While not always the case, enhanced prospects for advancement in the French republican armies did enable talented individuals to advance rapidly through the ranks.

Departure of the Conscripts (Louis-Léopold Boilly, 1808)

Napoleon Bonaparte, one of the officers promoted in this army, consequently inherited a greatly expanded army based on conscription, when he led his coup against the Directory using his fame as an officer of the army. Napoleon greatly expanded the army by integrating more conscripts and training them at the Camp of Boulogne, forming them into the Grande Armée.

=== Nineteenth century ===
Following France's defeat in the Napoleonic Wars, the restored Bourbon monarchy returned to its traditional reliance on long service volunteers plus some Swiss and German mercenary regiments. Numbers were filled out through limited conscription by lot, the burden of which spared the middle and upper classes who could afford to purchase exemption through the employment of paid substitutes. This unequal system continued until the Franco-Prussian War of 1870. Under the Third Republic, the French Army became the "school of the nation" utilizing general military service following the Prussian model. Shorter periods of service, alternative hospital duties or other forms of exemption were however still permitted for certain categories such as student teachers and priests. It was not until 1905 that universal military service for a period of two years, without exception on any but medical grounds, was introduced.

=== "Three Year Law" of 1913 ===
In 1913, France introduced a "Three Year Law" to extend the term of French military service to match the size of the Imperial German Army. France's population lagged significantly behind Germany in 1913; the population of mainland France was 40 million as opposed to Germany's 60 million. In contrast to Germany and Russia, who were able to offer exemptions or deferments to accommodate educational commitments or family circumstances, France required virtually all fit males of the appropriate age group to undertake full-time military service for three years from the age of 20. As part of the 1913 measures, a limited form of selective conscription was imposed on the Muslim population of Algeria, who had previously been required only to offer volunteers for service in the French Army.

=== World War I ===
With war imminent, 2.9 million men were mobilized in August 1914. These comprised conscripts undertaking their three years of obligatory service (see above), reservists of ages 24 to 30 who had completed their period of full-time service, and territorials drawn from older men up to the age of 45. While reservists had been required to undertake periodic re-training in the form of annual manoeuvres, the territorials had no peacetime commitment and were not intended for employment in the front-line in the event of war. However France's heavy losses on the Western Front required the deployment of all three categories of conscripted man-power, especially during the early months of the war.

=== Interwar period ===
France had retained conscription between the two world wars, though the country relied upon the French regulars of the Colonial Army, native regiments and the Foreign Legion to garrison its overseas empire. However, the birth rate dropped, primarily due to the fact that over a million young Frenchmen had been killed in the First World War and many more had been wounded.

As a transitional measure conscription was reduced to 18 months on 1 April 1923. In 1928 this was changed to one year. A serious short-fall in available numbers and the growing threat of Nazi Germany obliged the French Army to extend conscription to two years under the Law of 16 March 1935.

=== World War II ===
French morale in 1940 had declined for a variety of political, social and military reasons, and the French High Command largely consisted of aging commanders who had held senior positions in the First World War. On the outbreak of war, the French Army Commander-in-Chief General Maurice Gamelin was already past retirement age. In sending his best troops and the whole of the BEF through Belgium, he attempted to refight the Great War. He gravely underestimated the German Army's tactics, which contributed to the Fall of France and over 4 years of occupation.

Under German pressure, the small "Armistice Army" of the Vichy regime broke away from the now established French dependence on conscription in favour of voluntary enlistment. This short-lived force was poorly equipped and of mixed allegiances. North African and colonial forces were reduced to the level necessary to police the territories in which they were stationed.

In France itself the Vichy government created a compulsory national service organisation designated as the Chantiers de la Jeunesse Française (C.J.F. or French Youth Works). Created in 1940 this body provided military style basic training for approximately 400,000 inductees serving for eight months, until the German occupation authorities forced its disbandment in June 1944. Large numbers then joined the French resistance and eventually the re-created French regular army.

=== Post-war period and the end of conscription ===
Following liberation in 1944, France returned to a universal military service system. However, conscripts were not required to serve in the Indo-China War of 1947–54, which was fought by French, North African and colonial volunteers plus the Foreign Legion and locally recruited forces. This meant an increased reliance on voluntary enlistment and by 1950 conscripts made up only 29.1% of total French Army effectives. By contrast the Algerian War of 1954–62 involved the extensive use of conscripts, on the rationale that Algeria was legally part of metropolitan France. In 1957, with the Algerian War at its height, 57% of the army consisted of conscripts, mostly from metropolitan France. It was still possible to draw on substantial numbers of Algerian Muslim volunteers and conscripts, although issues of divided loyalties made the North African troops less dependable towards the end of the war. During this period, the majority of French military units were made up of a mix of volunteers and conscripts in varying proportions. Only the Foreign Legion remained an entirely professional force.

With France finally disengaged from colonial commitments it was possible to progressively reduce military service to 18 months from 1962, 12 months in 1970 and finally 10 months in 1992. During this period about three-quarters of each annual contingent of 18 year old males actually served. The army initially favoured the retention of conscription as an inexpensive means of obtaining qualified specialists, as well as providing a source of long-term recruits (one-third of the professional element began their military careers as conscripts).

The drawbacks of this reliance on short-term conscripts became evident at the time of the First Gulf War when France had to draw on its limited number of fully trained professional units to provide a significant contribution. Of 18,000 regulars sent to the Middle East about 5,000 had to be transferred from mixed professional/conscript units. The relevance of the historical system of universal military service to modern commitments and warfare accordingly came under review.

France accordingly suspended peacetime military conscription in 1996. President Jacques Chirac's government formally announced the end of compulsory military service in 2001. Conscription came to an end on 30 November 2001 when the last conscripts left after serving a reduced six months in uniform. Those enrolled between January and June 2001 were only required to spend six months in uniform rather than the previous 10 months. Only 23,000 conscripts were called up in 2001.

Young people are still required, however, to register for possible obligatory service of an unspecified nature (should the need arise). A recent change is that women must now register as well.

=== Journée Défense et Citoyenneté (JDC) ===
In 1998 the Journée Défense et Citoyenneté (JDC), the "Defence and Citizenship Day" was established by President Jacques Chirac. It is mandatory for all persons of French nationality, both males and females. At the conclusion of the program, an individual certificate is issued to each participant. This certificate is needed to take the baccalaureate examination (except for persons under 18 years of age), to enroll in a public university, to obtain a driving licence or to apply for any civil servant jobs.

From 1998 to 2010, this mandatory day was called Journée d’Appel de Préparation à la Défense, the "Defence Preparation Day".

=== Service national universel (SNU) ===
In 2019, President Emmanuel Macron introduced Service national universel (SNU), a national service currently on a voluntary basis, for a period of 4 weeks. It was planned to become a compulsory service in the future. Conscripts will spend two weeks in training and two weeks performing community service. The system has been described as "more scout camp than military service".
