= Fire services in France =

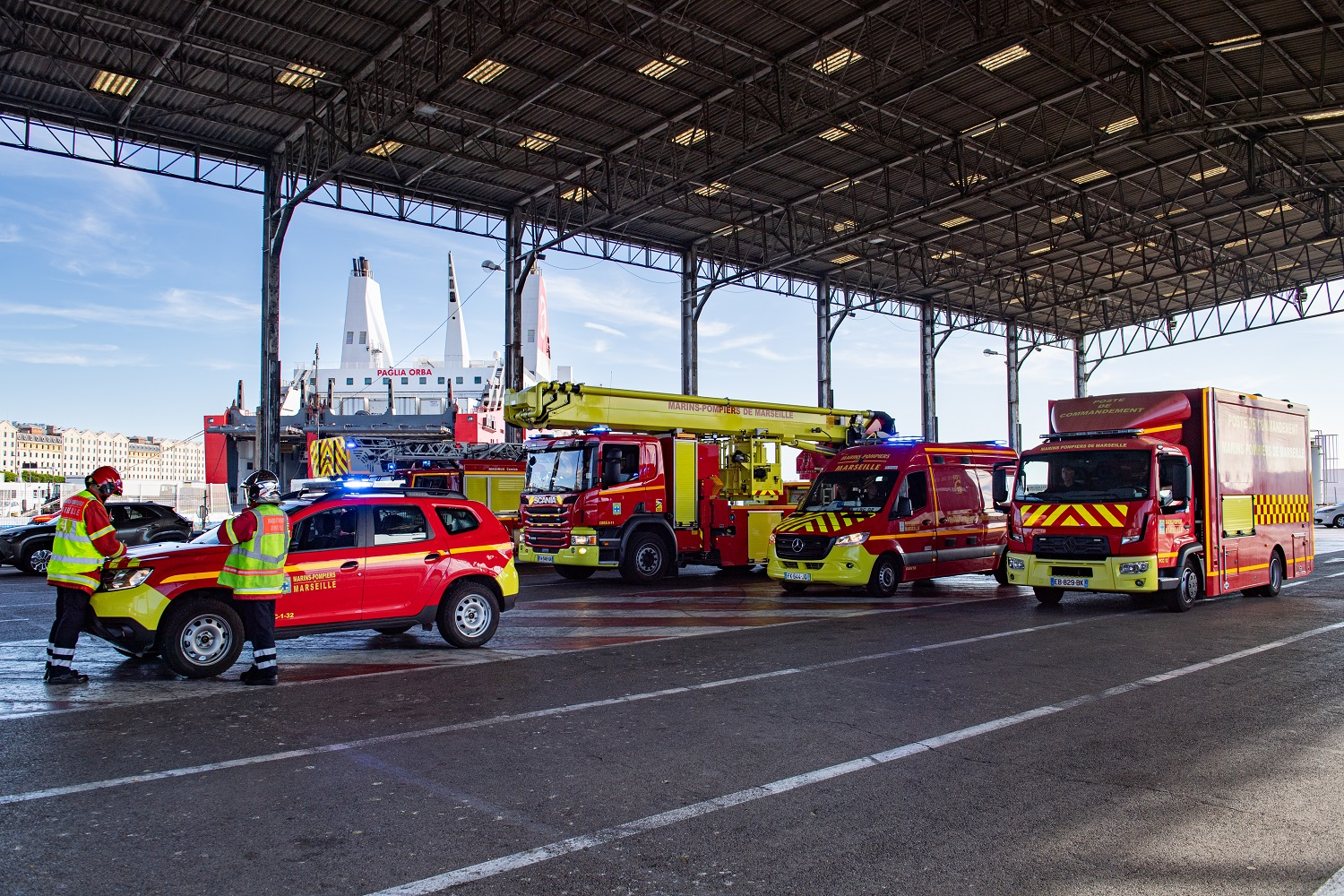
French military firemen

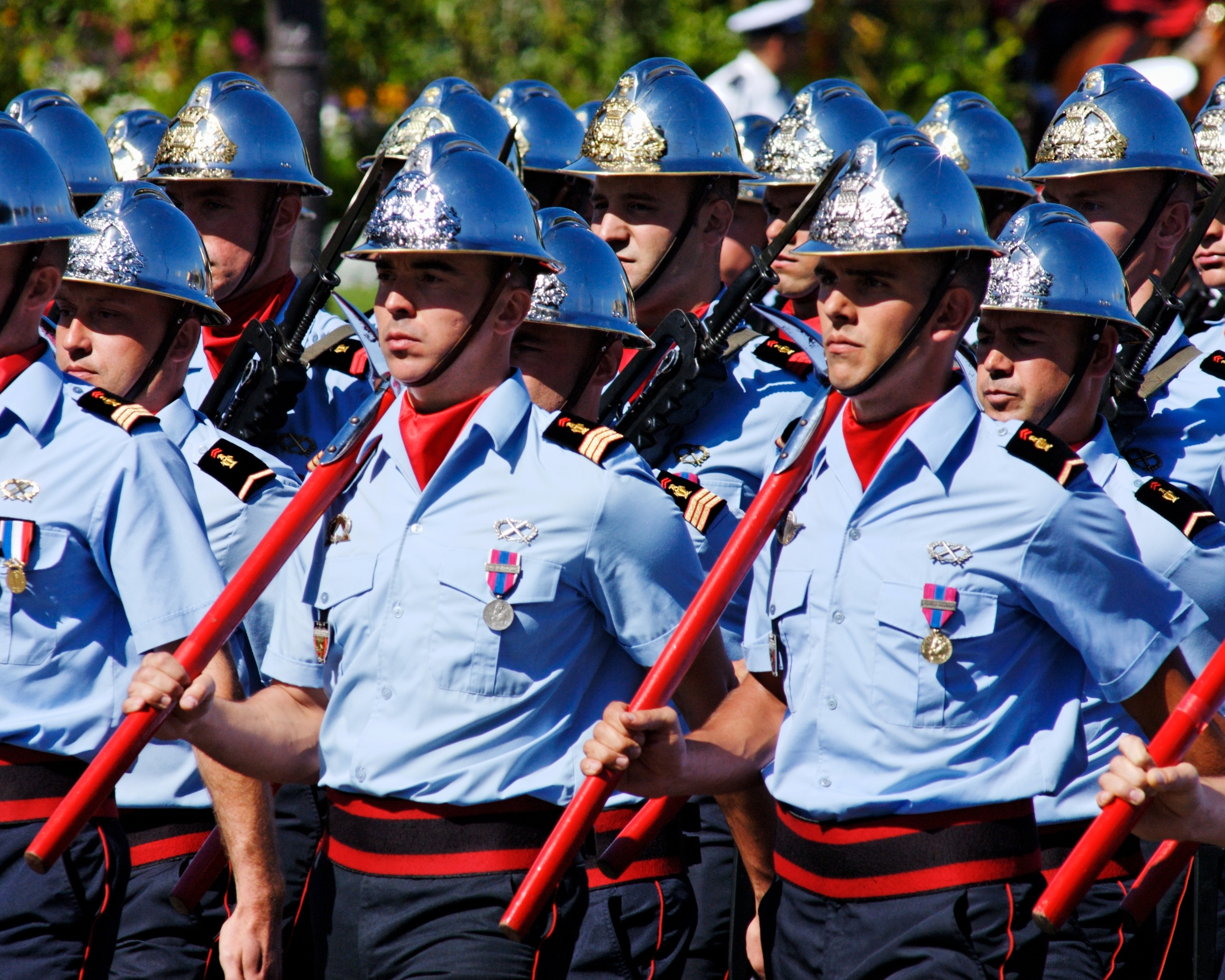
The Paris Fire Brigade at the Bastille Day Military Parade

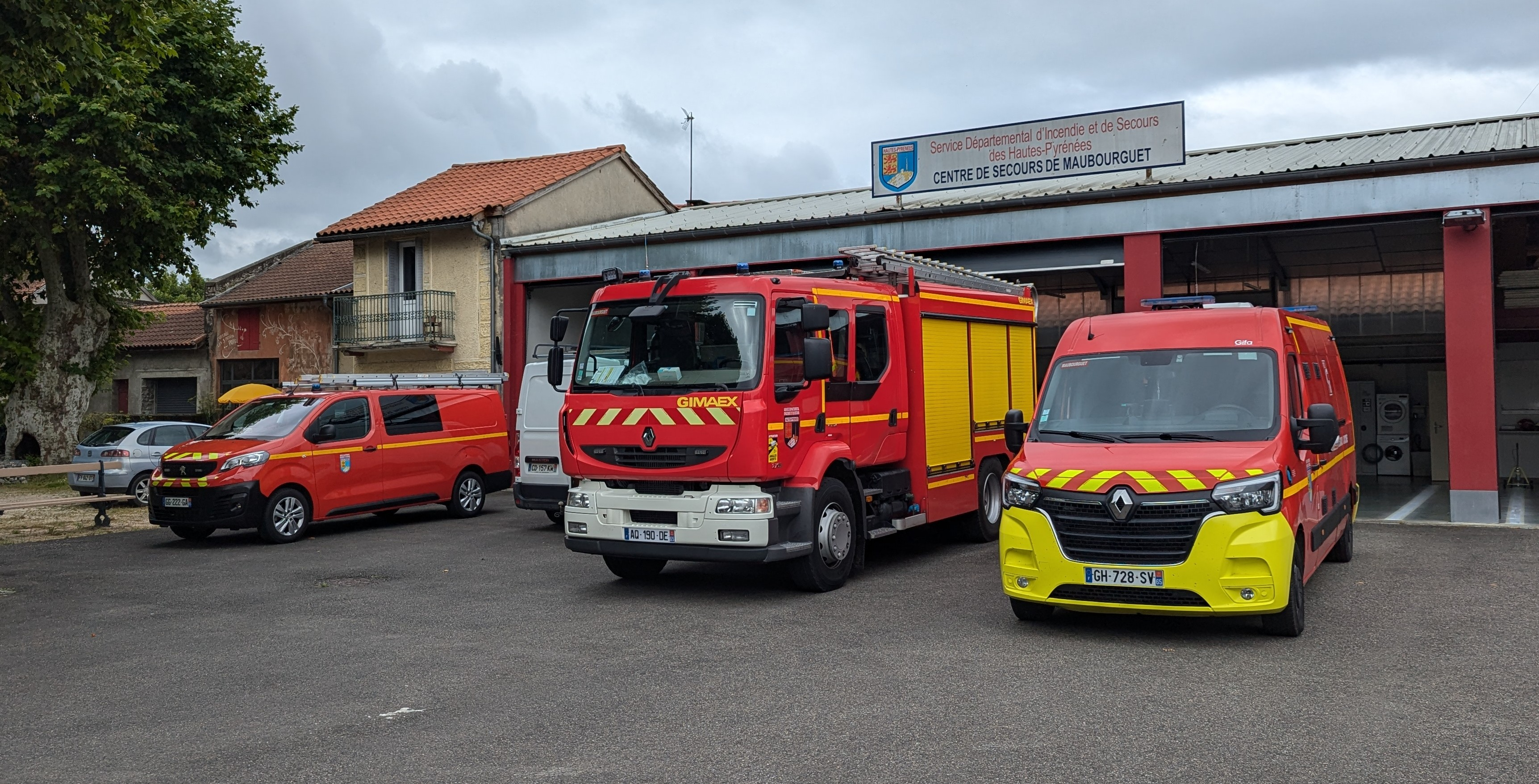
French Fire brigade in Maubourguet

The fire service in France is organised into local fire services which mostly cover the Departments of France, with a few exceptions. There are two types of fire service:

- The Paris Fire Brigade (Army) and Marseille Naval Fire Battalion (Navy) are military units providing fire protection to Paris and Marseille.
- The rest of France has civilian fire services organized, supervised and trained by the French Ministry of the Interior; specifically, they fall under the Civil Defence and Security Directorate (Direction Générale de la Sécurité Civile et de la Gestion de Crise, DGSCGC).

There are approximately 246,900 fire service personnel in France operating 15,642 emergency vehicles out of 6,894 emergency centres. In addition to providing fire protection and rescue, the French fire service is also one of the providers of emergency medical services.

In French, firefighters are known as sapeurs-pompiers or informally as pompiers. The former originally refers to the military-based Paris Fire Brigade. Pompier (pumper) comes from the word for pump (pompe), referring to the manual pumps originally used for firefighting. Sapeur means sapper and refers to the first official firefighting unit created by Napoleon I, which was part of the military engineering arm. Firefighters in the Marseille Marine Fire Battalion are known as marins-pompiers (sailor-firefighters). The usual name of a civilian fire services is a service départemental d'incendie et de secours (SDIS) (Departmental Fire and Rescue Service). Young French citizens can fulfill the mandatory service Service national universel (SNU) in one of the fire brigades.

== Organization ==
=== Central administration ===
The Directorate General for Civil Defence and Crisis Management (DGSCGC) is the central administrative structure responsible for risk management in France, whether it concerns everyday accidents or major disasters. It includes several directorates:

- Fire brigade directorate (DSP);
- Sub-directorate for crisis preparation, anticipation and management (SDPAGC);
- Sub-directorate for national resources (SDMN);
- Sub-directorate for international affairs, resources and strategy (SDAIRS).

The DGSCGC has at its disposal a civil defence headquarters (EMSC) and the general inspectorate for civil defence (IGSC). It employs approximately 3,000 civilian and military personnel spread over 60 sites.

=== Local fire services ===
The fire service is organized based on various departments. Each department has a Service Départemental d'Incendie et de Secours (SDIS, Departmental Fire and Rescue Service) responsible for operations within its territory, with a few exceptions:

- Paris and the three departments of the petite couronne (Hauts-de-Seine, Seine-Saint-Denis and Val-de-Marne) are covered by the Paris Fire Brigade.
- Bouches-du-Rhône is covered by both the Marseille Naval Fire Battalion and a civilian Bouches-du-Rhône SDIS.
- Lyon Metropolis and Rhône are both covered by the Rhône SDIS, reflecting Rhône's boundaries before 2015.
- Corsica is divided between two fire services, reflecting the departments that existed from 1975 to 2017.

=== Fire service based Emergency Medical Services ===
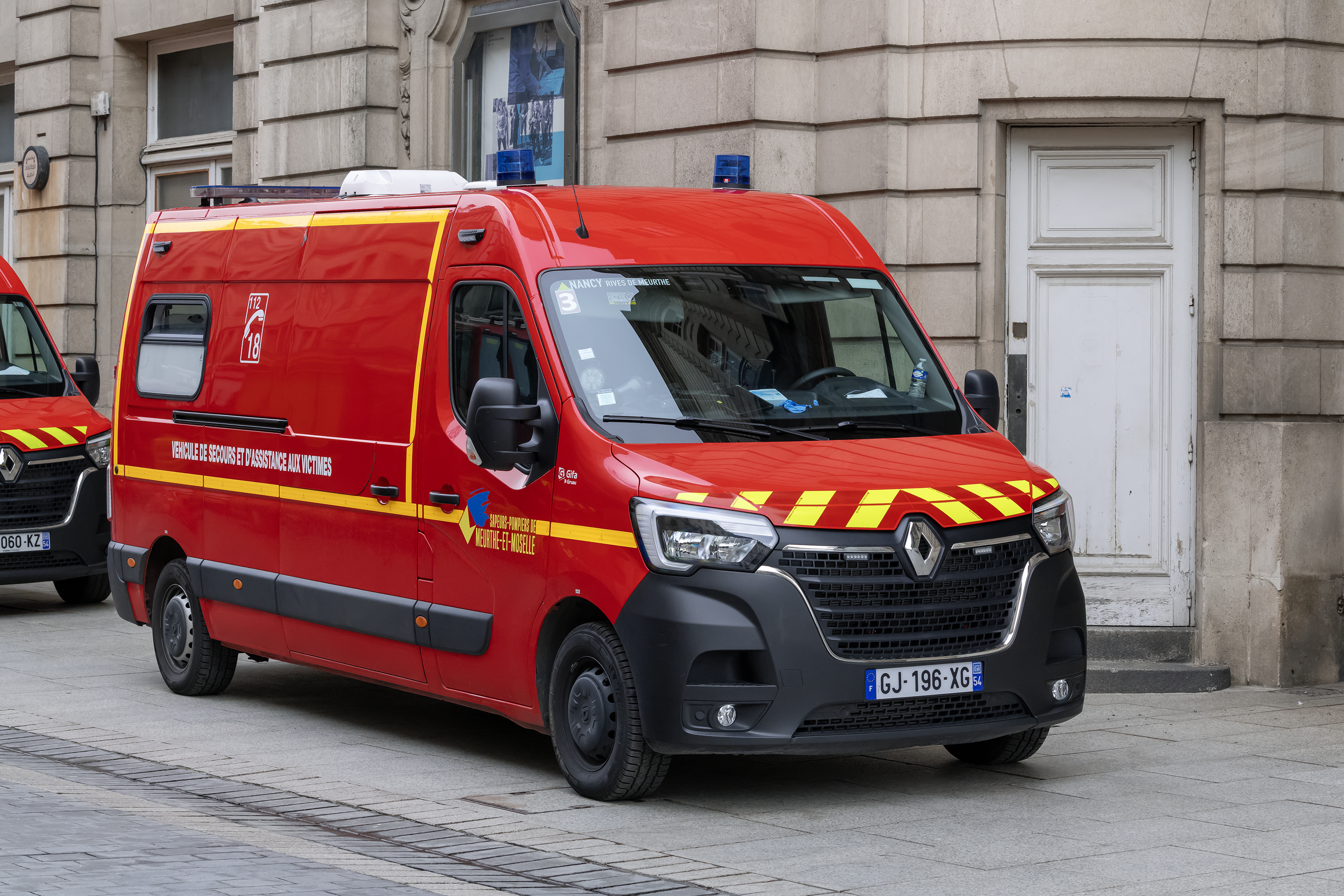
Ambulance (officially a VSAV) of the French fire service in Nancy, France

Local fire departments also respond to medical calls and can send an ambulance, a multi-purpose response vehicle or even a fire apparatus. Here the cross-trained firefighters will provide care at the scene and transport for injuries or illness but are usually backed up by a SMUR unit for more serious or complex cases. Firefighters are trained to provide basic life support (BLS) care.

Although they also transport casualties and are, in any practical sense, ambulances, their vehicles are instead called a VSAV (véhicule de secours et d'assistance aux victimes – rescue and casualty assistance vehicle). Volunteer-staffed ambulances may be called VPS (véhicules de premiers secours – first aid vehicle). The VSAV and VPS are considered to be means of bringing rescue workers and equipment to the scene, with the evacuation of patients being the logical result of the response but not the primary duty of these response resources.

== Personnel ==
Personnel strength of the French Fire Services 2015
Category	Status	Number of fire fighters and paramedics
Civilian fire services	professionals	40,354
Civilian fire services	volunteers	168,727
Volunteer fire brigades (Note: Not integrated into the fire services.)	volunteers	13,631
Fire Services EMS	professionals volunteers	11,910
Military fire services (Note: Including the Emergency Preparedness and Response Units from the French Combat engineering corps)	military	11,752
Military fire services EMS	military	173

As of December 2015 there were 246,900 firefighters in France:

- 78% voluntary/call firefighters
- 22% career firefighters, including:
  - 17% civilian
  - 5% military firefighters (the Paris Fire Brigade and Marseille Naval Fire Battalion)

In addition they employed 11,910 medical responders and 10,900 administrative and support personnel. The jeunes sapeurs-pompiers (Junior fighters) and cadets numbered 27,800.

== Civilian professional fire fighters ==
Civilian professional fire fighters are local government civil servants of class A, B, and C. Civil servants class A and B, and their volunteer counterparts, are trained at the National Fire College, École nationale supérieure des officiers de sapeurs-pompiers. Given their military origin, rank insignia follow those of the French Army.

=== Class C ===
Professional fire fighters class C are recruited from volunteer fire fighters or youth fire fighters, age 18 or above, with three years service as Sapper without a civil service exam. Corporals can be recruited with a civil service exam open to direct entry candidates who passed middle school, and through a civil service exam open to volunteer fire fighters or youth fire fighters, with three years service. In 2017, Sapeur de 1re classe was abolished and Sapeur de 2e classe was replaced by the rank of Sapeur, except for volunteers whose grades remained unchanged.

Promotion to Corporal can occur after three years as Sapper; to Chief Corporal after five years as Corporal. Sergents are selected through a civil service exam open to team leaders. Promotion to Adjudant and Chief Adjudant can occur after four years as Sergeant/Chief Sergeant.

Since 2013, Chief Adjutant is the highest NCO rank of most departments as the rank of Major has been abolished.

Grade	Insignia	Basic role
Sapeur 2e classe		Team Member
Sapeur de 1re classe (Volunteers only)		Team Member
Caporal		Team Member Team Leader
Caporal-chef		Team Leader
Sergent		Crew Commander one fire appliance with one team
Sergent-chef		Ditto three years in the grade
Adjudant		Senior Crew Commander one fire appliance with two teams
Adjudant-chef		Ditto three years in the grade

=== Class B ===
Professional fire fighters class B are recruited through civil service exams open to direct entry candidates with a foundation degree in engineering, and to fire fighters class C with four years service, leading to employment as Lieutenant 1st class; and through a civil service exam open to fire fighters class C qualified as senior crew commanders, leading to employment as Lieutenant 2nd class. 75% of the promotions from Lieutenant 2nd class to Lieutenant 1st class are through a civil service exam open to Lieutenants 2nd class with three years in the grade; 25 % through selection from Lieutenants 2nd class with five years in the grade. 75 % of the promotions from Lieutenant 1st class to Lieutenant above class are through a civil service exam open to Lieutenants 1st class with three years in the grade; 25 % through selection from Lieutenants 1st class with five years in the grade. Direct entry lieutenants 1st class are undergoing a 32 weeks course at the French Fire College (Ecole Nationale Supérieure des Officiers de Sapeurs-Pompiers). Lieutenants 2nd class are undergoing a 12-week course at the Fire College, while Lieutenants 1st class promoted from 2nd class, are in addition undergoing a course of 6 weeks.

Grade	Insignia	Basic roles
Expert		
Lieutenant de 2e classe		Incident Commander Bronze/Sector Commander; 2-4 crews Station Manager; Nine or less professional fire fighters
Lieutenant de 1re classe		Incident Commander Bronze/Sector Commander; 2-4 crews Station Manager; Ten or more professional fire fighters
Lieutenant hors classe		Incident Commander Bronze/Sector Commander; 2-4 crews Station Manager; Twenty or more professional fire fighters

=== Class A ===
Professional fire fighters class A are recruited through civil service exams open to direct entry candidates with a bachelor's degree in engineering, and to fire fighters class B qualified as sector commanders. Commandants are selected through a civil service exam from captains with three years in the grade; lieutenant-colonels from commandants with five years in the grade. Direct entry captains are undergoing a 42-week course, and internal entry captains a 10-week course, at the National Fire College.

Grade	Insignia	Basic roles
Capitaine		Incident Commander Silver/Operations Commander; 2-4 sectors Station Manager; Thirty or more professional fire fighters
Commandant		Incident Commander Gold; Incident Commander Silver/Operations Commander; 2-4 sectors Area Manager; Station Manager; Fifty or more professional fire fighters
Lieutenant-colonel		Incident Commander Gold; Area Manager; Station Manager; Hundred or more professional fire fighters

=== Class A+ ===
Professional fire fighters class A+ hold senior management positions, such as brigade manager, deputy brigade manager, or senior expert for the government.

Colonels are recruited through civil service exams open to fire fighters class A qualified as area managers. They undergo a 32-week course at the National Fire College.

Colonels hors-classe are selected from colonels with four years in the grade; contrôleurs généraux from colonels hors-classe with at least 8 years’ experience as brigade manager, senior manager for the government, or similar positions that are listed by a decree.

The contrôleur général insignia has 2 pyres. However some officers who handle special responsibilities within the government have a 3 pyres insignia.

Grade	Insignia	Basic roles
Colonel		Brigade Manager; Deputy Brigade Manager; Incident Commander Gold; Area Manager
Colonel hors-classe		Brigade Manager; Deputy Brigade Manager; Incident Commander Gold; Area Manager
Contrôleur général		Brigade Manager; Deputy Brigade Manager; Incident Commander Gold; Area Manager
Contrôleur général investi de responsabilités particulières		Head of the General Inspectorate of Civil Defence; Deputy Director in Central Administration; Assistant to the Head of the General Inspectorate of Civil Defence; Assistant to a Deputy Director in Central Administration; Chief of Staff of Civil Defence; Interministerial Chief of Staff of the Defense and Security Zone in Metropolitan France; Advisor for Senior Civil Defence Management Positions; Inspector General on Extraordinary Duty at the General Inspectorate of Administration; Director of the National Fire College.

=== Central administration ===
Grade	Insignia	Basic role
Sous-directeur		Head of a sub-directorate
Chef de service		Deputy head of the DGSCGC and head of the Fire brigade directorate
Directeur général		Head of the DGSCGC

== Responses ==
In 2015, the French fire services responded to 4,453,300 incidents, most of which were medical:

- Fires 300,700
- Road traffic accidents 279,400
- Medical emergencies 3,413,300
- Technological emergencies 53,200
- Other 406,700

Paris and Marseille comprise 10% of the national total.

== See also ==
- Emergency medical services in France
