= Defence and Citizenship Day (France) =

Defence and Citizenship Day (French: Journée Défense et Citoyenneté, pronounced [ʒuʁne defɑ̃s e sitwajɛnte]) is a one-day program for young people established in 1998 in France by French president Jacques Chirac as a replacement for mandatory conscription.

It is a one-day program that deals with citizenship, Duty of Remembrance, and awareness of defence, army, nation and European issues.

From 1998 to 2010, it was called Defence Preparation Day (Journée d’Appel de Préparation à la Défense).

== Participants ==
It is compulsory for all persons of French nationality, both males and females, who live in France or abroad, and is directed at young people aged between 16 and 25 years of age.

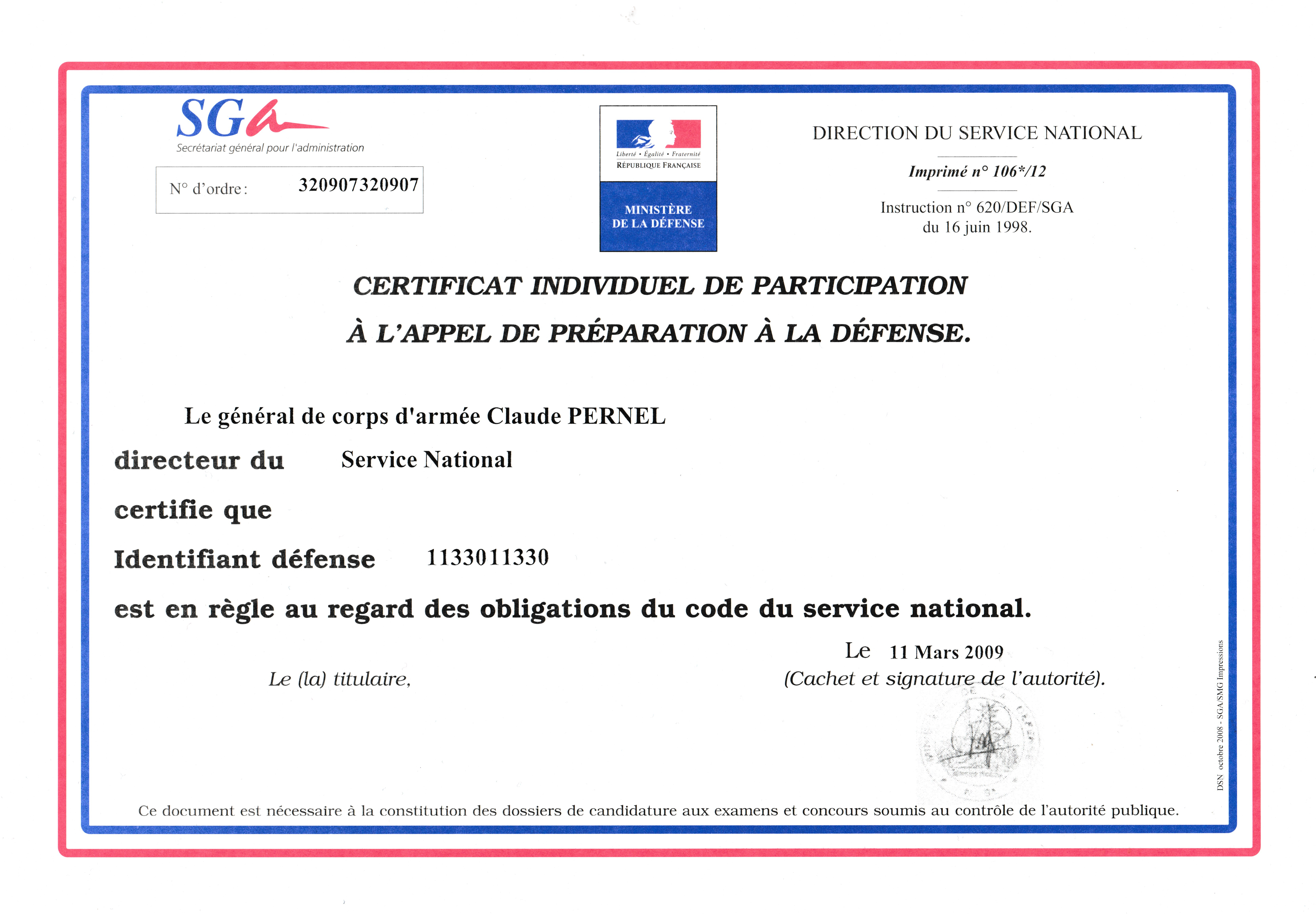
A certificate of the JAPD.

== Exception ==
Persons suffering from a serious illness and severely disabled persons are exempted as well as people living abroad if their embassy does not host the event.

== Activities ==
The program lasts one day, usually from 8:00AM to 5:00PM. Participants first start to fill out some administrative papers and then take some exams to evaluate their French text comprehension. Afterwards, participants learn more about the French defence, the European and international geopolitical situations, and also about international agreements.

It is also an opportunity for participants to discover army trades (such as technician, soldier, mender, pilot, sailor, tank driver etc.), and the different military training programs.

A first aid training has been integrated into the program since 2014.

== Certificate ==
At the conclusion of the program, an individual certificate is issued to each participant. This certificate is needed to take the baccalaureate examination (except for persons under 18 years of age), to enroll in a public university, to obtain a driving licence or to apply for any civil servant jobs.

== Service national universel ==
In 2019 the Service national universel (SNU) was introduced by president Emmanuel Macron and will become a compulsory service in 2021. It will last four weeks' time.

== See also ==
- Civil conscription
- Conscription in France
- Conscription
- Alternative civilian service
