= Service national universel =

French civil conscription service

Logo of the French Service national universel

French President Emmanuel Macron implemented the Service national universel (French pronunciation: [sɛʁvis nɑsjɔnal ynivɛʁsɛl]; SNU), the General National Service, which has been optional for all male and female citizens aged 15 to 17 starting in 2021. This voluntary service lasts for a month and can be performed in both civil and military facilities. The aim of this civil conscription service is to convey French values, to strengthen social cohesion and to promote social engagement. As is emphasized, it is not a matter of reintroducing conscription. This service was intended to replace the mandatory Journée Défense et Citoyenneté (JDC), the "Defence and Citizenship Day", that was established in 1998, after suspending conscription for the military service.

== Voluntary program ==
The basis of this voluntary service is to "increase the cohesion of the nation". For financial reasons, the service lasts one month only and is not compulsory. The draftees must wear uniform-like clothing, they have to hand over their mobile phones to their supervisors and are placed in collective accommodations far away from their home community. Half of the service is performed with civics and theoretical training. The daily routine follows a strict schedule: in the morning the anthem is sung at the flag roll call, and afterwards courses must be attended, such as a first aid course, an introduction to the written driver's license test, and learning rules of conduct in the event of a terrorist attack. The other half of the time has to be fulfilled with assignment in a non-profit organization, the military, the police, or a fire department.

== Full implementation ==
From 2021 until full implementation in 2026, the SNU may become mandatory for all young citizens, although this possibility is currently denied by Macron.

On 16 January 2025, the Senate voted to cut almost the entirety of the SNU's budget, directing 80% of funds toward investment in sports and rendering the program unimplementable. On September 19, 2025, Prime Minister Sébastien Lecornu announced the phasing out of the SNU starting from January 1, 2026 and its possible replacement by a “Voluntary Military Service”.

== See also ==
- Civil conscription
- Conscription in France
