= Compulsory fire service =

Mandatory fire department service

A compulsory fire service is a mandatory service for the local fire departments in Switzerland in general and in Austria and Germany in exceptional cases as well. Private individuals can be compelled to participate in such a fire service in specific circumstances. In Singapore conscripts are deployed as fire fighters when serving in the Singapore Civil Defence Force (SCDF).

In Switzerland this mandatory fire service is common and required in most regions. In Austria and Germany compulsory fire services only exist when a volunteer fire department cannot be pursued due to a lack of personnel or other unavailability, meaning that fire protection cannot be guaranteed 24/7. All appropriate persons can be drafted to the compulsory fire service if they are needed.

== Legal situation ==
Member States (green) of the Convention. ILO members that did not ratify are shown in red.

The draft for a compulsory fire service is an exception of the Forced Labour Convention of 1930 of the International Labour Organization (ILO) and therefore unfree labour shall not include:

- any work or service exacted in virtue of compulsory military service laws for work of a purely military character;
- any work or service which forms part of the normal civic obligations of the citizens of a fully self-governing country;
- any work or service exacted from any person as a consequence of a conviction in a court of law, provided that the said work or service is carried out under the supervision and control of a public authority and that the said person is not hired to or placed at the disposal of private individuals, companies or associations (requiring that prison farms no longer do convict leasing);
- any work or service exacted in cases of emergency, that is to say, in the event of war, of a calamity or threatened calamity, such as fire, flood, famine, earthquake, violent epidemic or epizootic diseases, invasion by: animal, insect or vegetable pests, and in general any circumstance that would endanger the existence or the well-being of the whole or part of the population;
- minor communal services of a kind which, being performed by the members of the community in the direct interest of the said community, can therefore be considered as normal civic obligations incumbent upon the members of the community, provided that the members of the community or their direct representatives shall have the right to be consulted in regard to the need for such services.

== Austria ==
In history, a very high number of the Austrian-Hungarian fire services were compulsory fire brigades and the basis for the present-day volunteer fire departments (Freiwillige Feuerwehr) in Austria. In theory, drafts for the local fire services are feasible, but have not executed in centuries. The legislation differs from state to state:

- Burgenland: legal basis for drafts abolished in 2019
- Carinthia: drafts for a so called "fire protection service" (Brandschutzdienst / Brandschutzdienstpflicht) is possible
- Lower Austria: legal basis for drafts abolished in 2000
- Salzburg: drafts for fire services are legal, if no professional or volunteer fire service exists or has insufficient manpower
- Styria: legal basis for drafts in state legislation
- Tyrol: municipal councils can order conscription for the fire service for male citizens between the age of 18 and 50, there are exceptions for state and federal officials, members of transport and public utility companies and clerics of all confessions as well.
- Upper Austria: legal basis for drafts abolished in 2015
- Vienna: professional fire department, no drafts for fire service required
- Vorarlberg: drafts for fire services is possible, if volunteers are short-handed. The mayor can draft only male citizens of the age between 18 and 60 of the municipality. Only the house owners can be drafted and younger citizens should be preferred to be drafted. There are several exceptions for state officials, soldiers, police officers and clerics as well.

== Germany ==
Similar to the historical development in Austria, compulsory fire services (Pflichtfeuerwehr) are the precursors of the volunteer fire brigades (Freiwillige Feuerwehr) in Germany. Depending on the state's legislation, drafts are executed in a few municipalities. These municipal fire brigades drafted conscript fire fighters:

- Fire brigade of Altwarp in Mecklenburg-Vorpommern
- Fire brigade of Burg (Dithmarschen) in Schleswig-Holstein
- Fire department Friedrichstadt in Schleswig-Holstein
- Fire brigade of List on the island of Sylt
- Fire brigade of Pietzpuhl in Saxony-Anhalt

== Singapore ==
In Singapore the National Service is a statutory requirement for all male Singaporean citizens and second-generation permanent residents to undergo a period of compulsory service in the uniformed services. Depending on physical and medical fitness, they serve a two-year period as National Servicemen Full-time (NSFs), either in the Singapore Armed Forces (SAF), the Singapore Police Force (SPF) or the Singapore Civil Defence Force (SCDF), which provides fire-fighting and EMS services in Singapore.

== Switzerland ==
=== Form of organization of the Militia Fire Brigades ===
In Switzerland, it is common for compulsory fire service duty to be required of both men and women, whether or not they are Swiss. Most fire services in Switzerland are so called Militia Fire Brigades (Miliz-Feuerwehr). Militia firefighters normally pursue other professions, and have active duty only during exercises and missions. In special situations (major events, demonstrations, etc.) the fire brigade provides a standby service. Currently 95,000 people serve as firefighters in 1,500 fire brigades (Feuerwehrkorps); 92% are men. Only 1,200 of the 95,000 are professional firefighters, organised as plant fire brigades or a unit of a larger city.

=== Exceptions ===
Compulsory fire service exists in 21 out of 26 Swiss cantons. Exceptions include for example, the canton of Zurich, and in all places where professional fire brigades exist. If a fire brigade cannot find enough volunteers, it can carry out forced recruitment. These drafts are not popular, because the recruited firefighters are generally less motivated. Anyone who rejects service must pay a fire service exemption tax.

== See also ==
- Civil conscription
- Community service
- Fire department
- German fire services
- Volunteer fire department
