= Umuganda =

Monthly national holiday in Rwanda

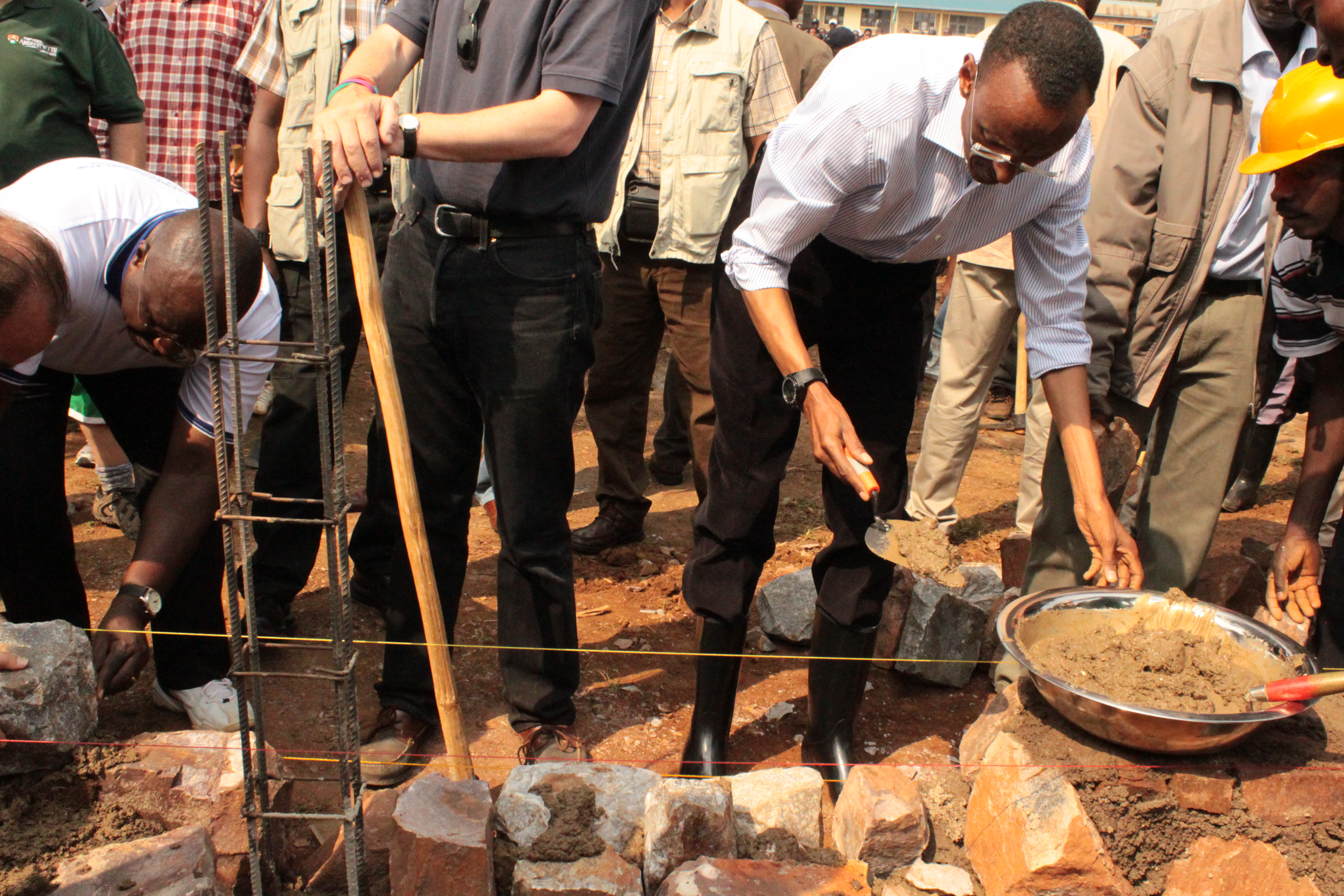
President Paul Kagame participating in Umuganda in Kicukiro District, 2011

Umuganda is a national holiday in Rwanda taking place on the last Saturday of every month for mandatory nationwide community service from 08:00 to 11:00. Participation in Umuganda is required by law; failure to participate can result in a fine.

The program was most recently re-established under President Paul Kagame in 2009, having resulted in a notable improvement in the cleanliness of Rwanda. Also, there are other informal Umuganda day activities that occur in the middle of the month. These activities are initiated by either society or the government.

== Etymology ==
Umuganda means "coming together in common purpose" in Kinyarwanda, the official language of Rwanda. The word was derived from the Nguni proverb 'Umuntu ngumuntu ngabantu'', which means "a person is a person through other persons". In the 1970s, however, the term was synonymous with forced labour.

== History ==
=== Pre-colonial era ===
In the pre-colonial era, there were two forms of what is now known as Umuganda day: Ubudehe and Umuganda. Ubudehe was in preparation for agricultural season; however, it was not as inclusive as Umuganda since it only included people in the agricultural sector. Umuganda was used as a way to work together as a community to stimulate the social and economic climate of Rwanda. Communities came together to help people who were unable to do physical work, like farming or stimulating infrastructure. This protected their state and human security as well as creating economic opportunities. It was a means of collective action and social obligation. Also, umuganda allowed people connect and exchange goods, like oxen.

=== Colonial era ===
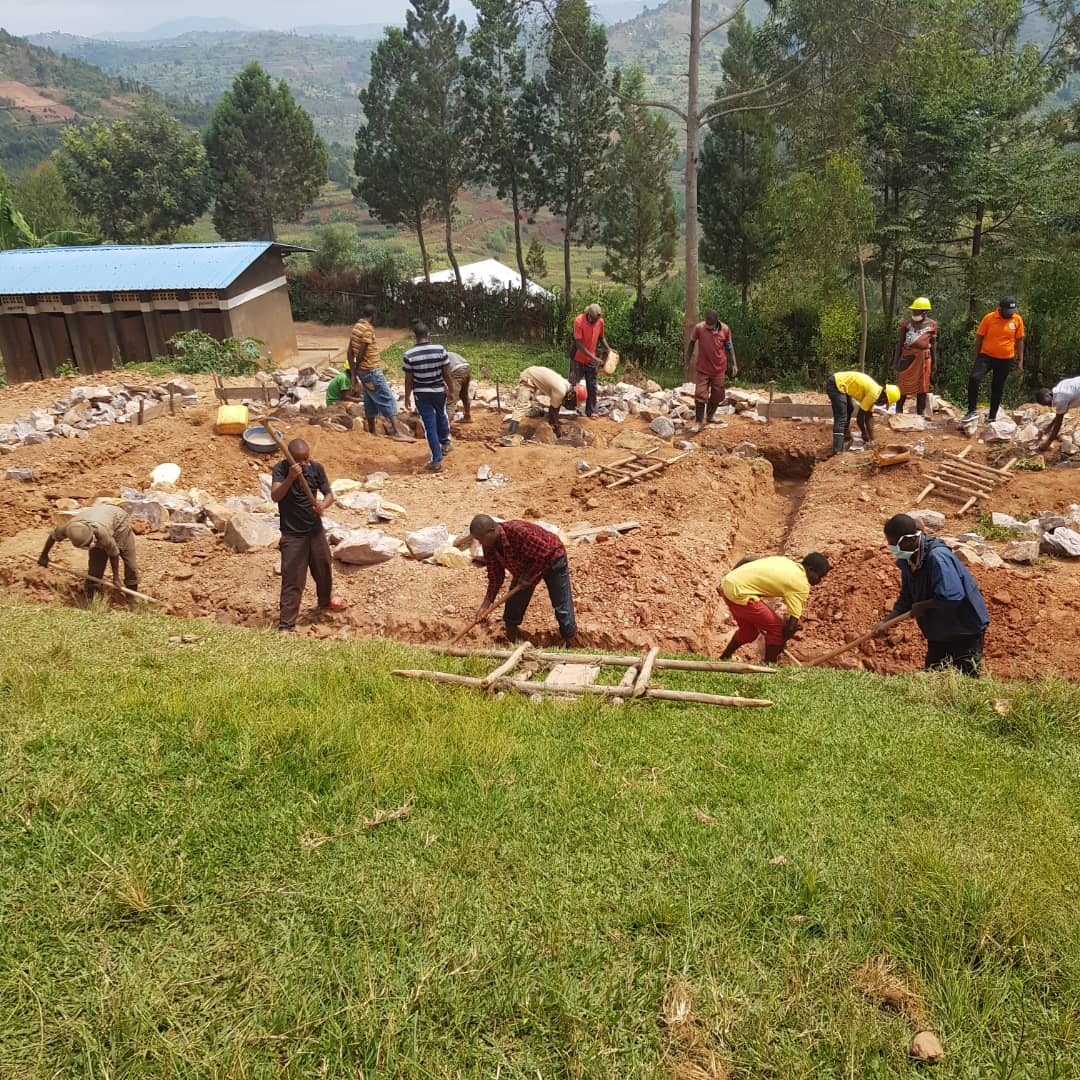
Umuganda in Rusange, 2021

In the late 1800s, Belgian elites in Rwanda wanted to limit the King's monetary flow and bring about the end of the patronage system. Belgian elites used the idea of umuganda to enforce a new communal work system of uburetwa. Uburetwa was a communal work system that forced every adult male to participate in 60 days of community labor per year. This system was initiated in the 1940s and was implemented by local leaders. It left people with little time to provide for themselves, and often they were unable to sustain their families. In the 20th century, Rwandans were recorded as being required to work for their community leader twice a week, while the Belgians encouraged "umuganda" as a way of life.

=== Present day ===
In the run-up to the Rwandan genocide, weekly umuganda meetings were successfully used by Hutu elites to mobilise Hutu civilians for genocide. It became more widely known as a political institution rather than communal growth. It fulfilled the interests of the elites in Rwanda. Umuganda tasks may have included "building schools, repairing roads, constructing bridges, digging anti-erosion ditch, and other state projects".

During the perpetration of the Rwandan genocide, the government used Umuganda as a means of oppression and ethnic division. It bolstered Hutu power. Hutus used the name of umuganda as a means to exterminate Tutsis. People who were unable to participate in the day were seen as an enemy of the state.

As part of Rwanda's reconstruction efforts after the genocide, President Paul Kagame mandated that every last Saturday of the month would be known as "umunsi w'umuganda" or "contribution made by the community", during which all traffic would be stopped for three hours in the morning in order for Rwandans to clean up the war-torn capital. The policy of Umuganda day was born from a need for cultural policy in reconciliation for the genocide. From research out of Kigali and the Western Province, post-genocide, Rwandan people felt that the main reasons for Umuganda was "cheap labour force, to train the population for self-solving problems, maintain unity, [and] to create a channel of communication". This group of people also understood Umuganda as "a forced but beneficial public work and a voluntary and beneficial public work" more than "a forced but non-beneficial labour and a tool of oppression by leaders". People are incentivized to participate due to "mutual help; meeting friends; neighbors and socialising; pleasing leaders; getting information about the government's plans; and because of the fear of punishment or prosecution".

Umuganda as it exists presently was instituted in 2009. It is now regarded as a day of community clean-up. The Rwandan government uses the day to implement programs and plans, like poverty reduction and economic growth. It is meant to involve people in the "decision-making process" and promote involvement in the community. Also, the government is able to have "a forum for local officials to inform citizens about the important news, and for residents to discuss community or individual needs, and as contributing to unity and progress locally, as well as to national development". There is a sense of reconciliation in Rwanda because of Umuganda; however, it is not well documented how much of the Rwandan population feels this way. This may be due to the election and presidency of President Kagame.

Inspired by the success of Umuganda in Rwanda, the Mayor of Johannesburg Herman Mashaba introduced a volunteer cleanup programme called A Re Sebetseng in August 2017. President Kagame says about Umuganda day: "We have been talking of schools and new roads—that is what Rwandans deserve. These shouldn't be something out of the ordinary. We may need assistance from others but use it so we can reach where we want to be. Any initiative based on these principles is worthwhile and will be sustainable". The United Nations Mission in South Sudan (UNMISS) instituted a similar program in South Sudan in June 2019. During the COVID-19 pandemic, the practice of Umuganda was a way to mobilize the community to mental and physical health.

== Enforcement and effectiveness ==
All Rwandans aged 18 to 65, except those unfit to participate, are legally required to take part in Umuganda civil conscription scheme; non-compliance may result in a fine of FRw 5,000 (equivalent to US$3.39 in 2026). Umuganda has led to a considerable improvement in the cleanliness of Rwanda.
