= Marseille Naval Fire Battalion =

Fire and rescue service for the city of Marseille, France

- Bataillon de marins-pompiers de Marseille
- Active: 1939–present
- Country: France
- Branch: French Navy
- Type: Firefighter
- Role: Firefighting, emergency service
- Size: 2,400
- Motto: Honneur, patrie, valeur, discipline

Commanders
- Current commander: Vice Admiral Jean-Michel L'Hénaff

Showcase video of the Marseille Naval Fire Battalion

The Marseille Naval Fire Battalion (French: Bataillon de marins-pompiers de Marseille, BMPM), is the fire and rescue service for the city of Marseille.

The battalion is a branch of the French Navy (French: Marine nationale), and consists of fully military personnel, like the Paris Fire Brigade (a branch of the French Army), and PGHM (a branch of the French Gendarmerie).

Nearly half of all candidates fail the battalion's rigorous training program.

== Mission ==
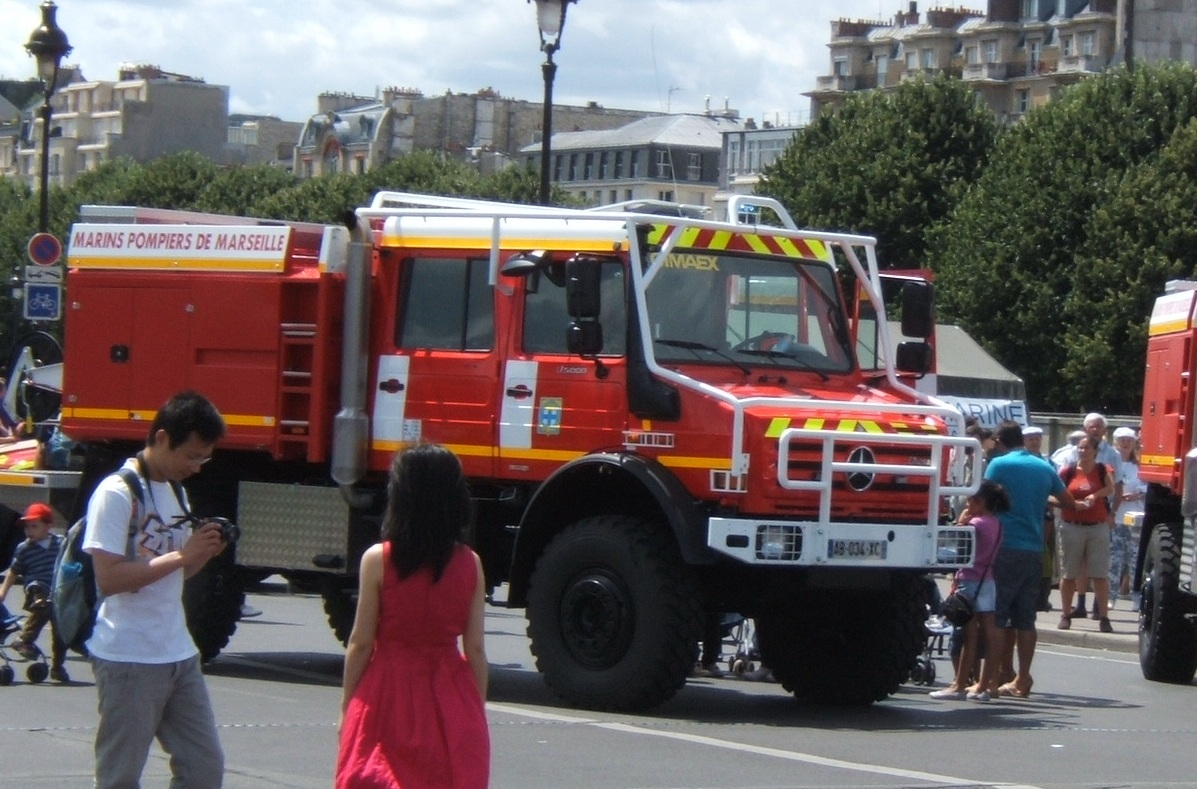
BMPM Unimog intervention truck

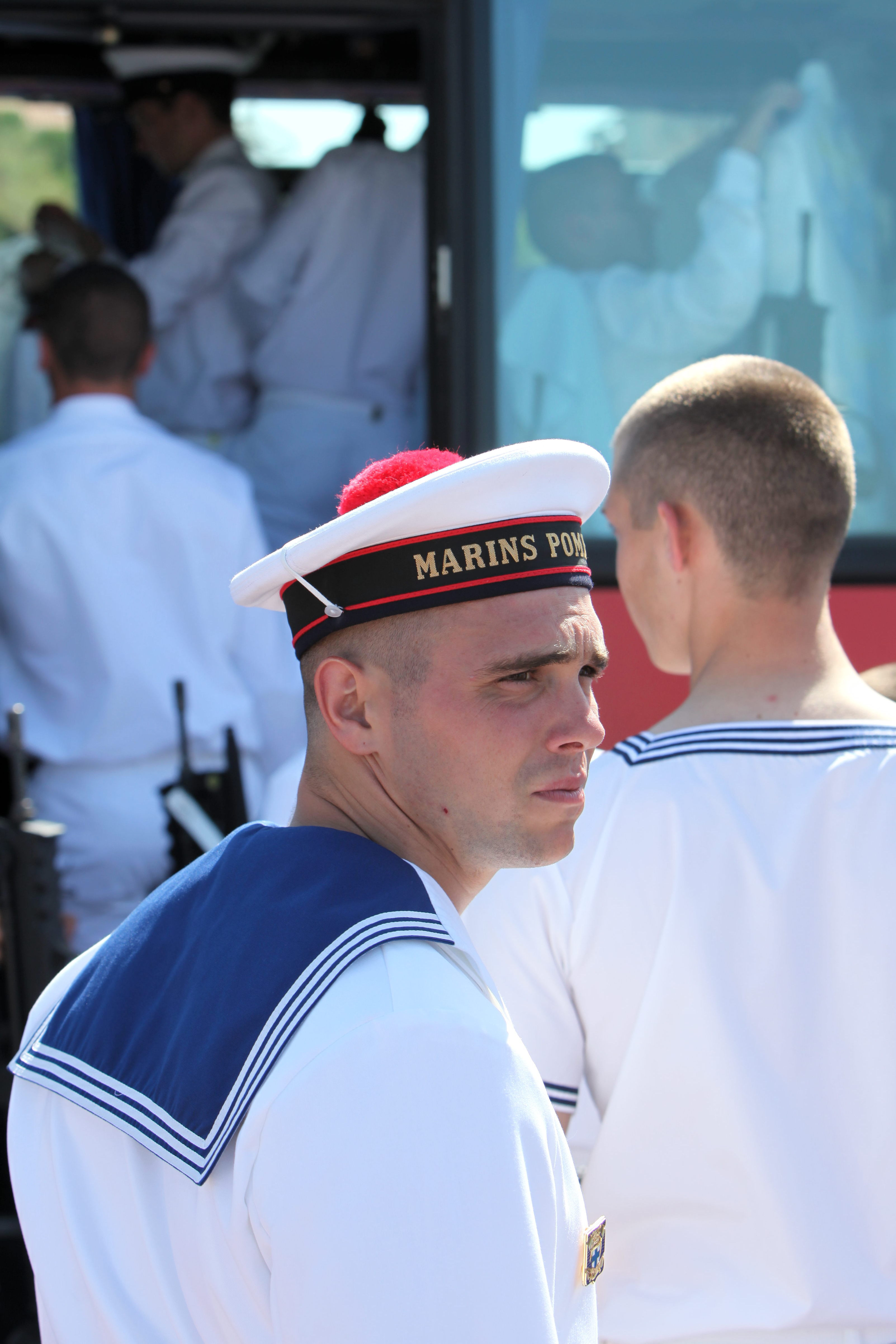
A Marin-Pompier in parade uniform

BMPM fireboat during the 2024 Summer Olympics

1. Fire Suppression on land and at sea
2. Emergency Ambulance
3. Utility Safety- Gas leaks, etc.
4. Personnel Assistance: Victims services, SAR, prehospital care
5. Motor Vehicle Collision assistance
6. Property protection
7. Fire and Rescue Patrol, Reconnaissance and Scouting
8. Animal Rescue
9. Pollution control and response
10. Alarm response

== History ==
Formed by Royal Order on 14 August 1719 as the Marseille Arsenal Fire Battalion and its jurisdiction was expanded on 25 September 1816 to include the Ville de Marseille (City of Marseille). On 22 March 1838 its size was fixed as a battalion of five companies and on 14 December 1962, its jurisdiction was expanded to include the port of Marseille and the Marseille-Provence Marignane International Airport.

The battalion of Naval Fire Marseille was created by a decree dated 29 July 1939, following the 28 October 1938 fire of the New Galleries, located on the Canebière, which caused the death of 73 people .

Edouard Daladier, Prime Minister, observes the professionalism of the Toulon marine brigade and the quality of their equipment. He decides to entrust the security of Marseille to a military unit. The Decree-Law of 23 July 1939 is the "birth" of Marseille Naval Fire Battalion and begins with this:

"It's created a Marseille Marine Fire unit. This battalion and the services attached to it are controlled by a senior naval officer ... "

The Marseille Naval Fire Brigade has today a military status and is commanded by a vice-admiral.

== Resources ==
The BMPM consists of 2,400 personnel and 700 vehicles.

In 2009, the BMPM responded to 118,000 operations and to 108 000 in 2010. In 2011, it carried 111,700 interventions, an average of 285 per day, approximately one every 5 minutes, with more than two thirds regarding the "rescue victim" (prehospital care).

== Corporate organisation ==
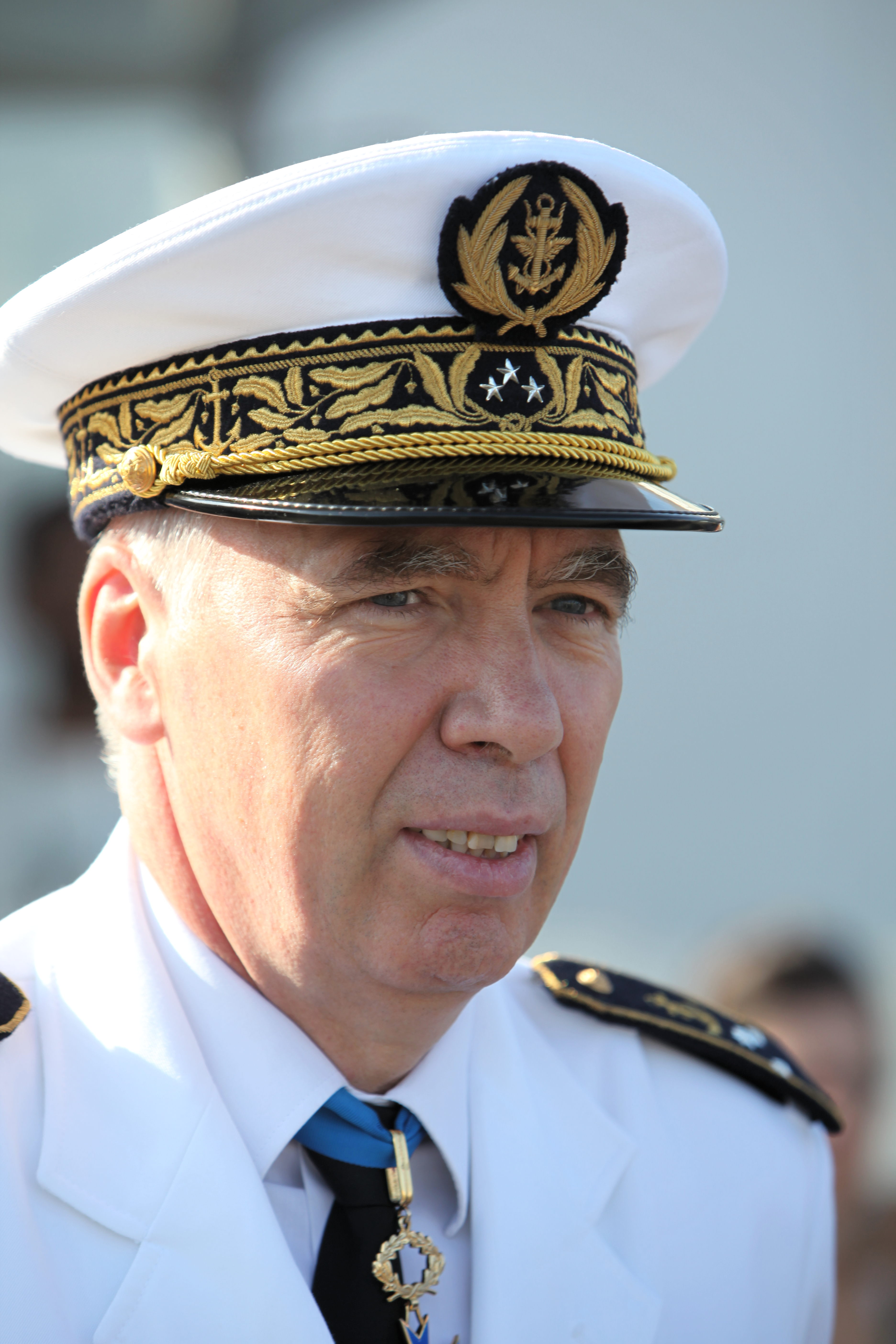
Vice Admiral Jean-Michel L'Hénaff, former commanding officer of the BMPM.

The battalion is commanded by a naval flag officer (currently Vice Admiral Charles-Henri Garié) as part of the Marseille garrison. He reports to the Minister of Defence, the Minister of the Interior and the Mayor of Marseille. Thus, rank insignia follow the French Navy practice.

== See also ==
- Sapeurs-Pompiers
