= Civil mobilization =

Legal compulsion for civilians to work

Civil mobilization is the legal compulsion for civilians to work, in distinction to military mobilization. It has been used on a number of occasions by a number of governments. This generally makes striking illegal for the duration of the mobilization.

== Belgium 1964 ==
To prevent a doctors strike, the Belgium government, in April 1964, issued a civil mobilization order for hospital doctors and military doctors.

== Greece 2010-2015 ==
In Greece, civil mobilization orders were made for dock workers, teachers and power workers .

Civil mobilization in Greece during the Greek debt crisis
Year	Workers
2010	Truck drivers
2011	Municipal cleaning staff
2013	Workers in athens metro, tram and electric railway
2013	Maritime workers
2014	Electricity power workers

== Israel (1967 and onward) ==
During 1967, the Israeli government passed legislation allowing for emergency civil mobilization. This legislation allows the Ministry of Defence, the Ministry of Internal Security and since the COVID-19 epidemic, the Ministry of Health as well. The Israeli legislation allows for the mandatory employment of employees in "vital industries", responsible for sustaining the Israeli population and the war effort, such as food, armaments etc.

== See also ==
- Civil conscription
