= Civil conscription =

Compulsory non-military labor service

Civil conscription is the obligation of civilians to perform mandatory labour for the government. This kind of work has to correspond with the exceptions in international agreements, otherwise it could fall under the category of unfree labour. There are two basic kinds of civil conscriptions. On the one hand, a compulsory service can be ordered on a temporary basis during wartimes and other times of emergency, like severe economic crisis or extraordinary natural events to provide basic services to the population. These include, but are not limited to, medical care, food supplies, defense industry supplies or cleanup efforts, following a severe weather or environmental disaster for the duration of the emergency. Therefore, it generally makes striking illegal for the duration of the civil mobilization. On the other hand, a revolving mandatory service may be required for a longer period of time, for example, to ensure community fire protection or to carry out infrastructure work at a local or community level.

== Legal situation ==
Member States (green) of the Convention. ILO members that did not ratify are shown in red

Civil conscription is an exception of the Forced Labour Convention of 1930 of the International Labour Organization (ILO) and therefore unfree labour shall not include:

- any work or service exacted in virtue of compulsory military service laws for work of a purely military character;
- any work or service which forms part of the normal civic obligations of the citizens of a fully self-governing country;
- any work or service exacted from any person as a consequence of a conviction in a court, provided that the said work or service is carried out under the supervision and control of a public authority and that the said person is not hired to or placed at the disposal of private individuals, companies or associations (requiring that prison farms no longer do convict leasing);
- any work or service exacted in cases of emergency, that is to say, in the event of war, of a calamity or threatened calamity, such as fire, flood, famine, earthquake, pandemic or epizootic diseases, invasion by: animal, insect or vegetable pests, and in general any circumstance that would endanger the existence or the well-being of the whole or part of the population;
- minor communal services of a kind which, being performed by the members of the community in the direct interest of the said community, can therefore be considered as normal civic obligations incumbent upon the members of the community, provided that the members of the community or their direct representatives shall have the right to be consulted in regard to the need for such services.

== Types of civil conscription ==
The civil conscription services can be classified into three basic types:

=== Civil conscription due to extraordinary events ===
In times of extraordinary events, such as in times of war, in economic crisis, in the event of natural disasters or during the occurrence of epidemics or pandemics, a civil duty may be established to perform the tasks deemed necessary by the government for a certain period of time, to ensure the restoration of former status quo. These important tasks include the basic supply of the population, such as medical care, food supply, the defense industry for the duration of the war or a state of emergency, and the removal of damage to the infrastructure after severe weather or environmental disasters.

=== Civilian conscription for the benefit of the community ===
A government can order a civil service duty to be performed repetitive for a longer period of time, for example to ensure the fire protection of a municipality or to carry out simple work at the municipal level, that smaller municipalities are unable to do financially or due to lack of manpower.

=== Civilian duty to strengthen "national values" ===
Some countries have implemented a compulsory service for younger age groups or educational groups to convey "national values" and to strengthen national cohesion, which in part has to be done in military, social or school-like institutions.

== Present-day civil conscription ==
=== Austria ===
In Austria in addition to the current mandatory military service for male citizens in the Austrian Armed Forces and the legally connected alternative civilian services, citizens can be conscripted to perform following services:

- Compulsory fire service (German: Pflichfeuerwehr): By State legislation in Carinthia, Salzburg, Tyrol and Vorarlberg, male citizens can be conscripted by a municipality to serve in a fire brigade. In the 19th century and at the beginning of the 20th century, the majority of fire brigades were compulsory for male citizens in Austria, but for decades no compulsory fire brigades have been ordered by a municipality.
- Hand and hitch-up services (German: Hand- und Zugdienste): In Vorarlberg by state legislation, (mainly male) citizens can be obliged by municipalities to provide hand and hitch-up services to reduce local taxes. If a citizen does not fulfill this mandatory service, an additional municipal fee is obligatory.

=== France ===
Code général des collectivités territoriales

According to article L2215-1 of the Code général des collectivités territoriales (General Law of Local Authorities), the prefect of a department may take measures for the municipalities of the respective department to maintain public order, as well as for the prevention of danger in general and for health protection in general. Among other regulations, this law allows to conscript system-preserving professional groups to provide essential services. In 2022, oil refinery workers were required to take up work during a strike to ensure the supply of fuel.

Logo of the French Service national universel

État d'urgence sanitaire

During a sanitary state of emergency (French: état d'urgence sanitaire) it is possible to draft personnel of necessary professional groups to combat a health disaster, like during the COVID-19 pandemic in France.

Journée Défense et Citoyenneté

In 1998, the Journée Défense et Citoyenneté (JDC), the "Defence and Citizenship Day", was established by the French President, Jacques Chirac, after suspending the conscription for the military service. It is a one-day program that deals with citizenship, Duty of Remembrance, awareness on defence, army, nation, European issues etc.

Service national universel

In 2019, President Emmanuel Macron introduced a compulsory service, the Service national universel (SNU), the "General National Service", which will be mandatory for all citizens aged 16–25 within the next century. It lasts for one month, the service can be done in both civilian and military institutions. The aim of this general civil conscription is to communicate French values, to strengthen social cohesion and to promote social engagement.

=== Germany ===
Federal level

In Germany during a "State of Defence" male citizens could be drafted for the military service in the Bundeswehr or for a mandatory service in the border guard, although conscription is suspended for peacetime. Beside this during the state of defense the constitution allows civil conscription as well, female citizens between the ages of 18 and 55 could be called to perform medical duties, male citizens could be drafted for a service in a civil protection force. If required, the freedom to practice one's profession may be limited. During the state of defense the Federal Employment Agency (BA) receives special powers to order (unemployed) persons to jobs, that cannot be ensured on a voluntary basis. The conscripted persons can be used in following assignments:

- in the Bundeswehr
- Federal authorities
- State authorities
- Municipal authorities
- in civil defense units
- Electricity and water supply companies
- Waste and wastewater disposal companies
- in hospitals
- in nursing homes
- Oil refineries
- Transport companies and shipping lines
- Successor companies of the former Deutsche Bundespost, like the Deutsche Post AG, Deutsche Postbank and Deutsche Telekom
- at the Deutsche Flugsicherung, the German air traffic control

State level

Depending on the respective state's legislations and in addition to the - in theory possible - mandatory civil service obligations at the federal legislation level, there are three more civil conscription services possible, that allow communities to draft citizens:

- the Compulsory Fire Service (German: Pflichfeuerwehr), which in fact is in force in a handful of communities,
- the Dyke Relief Service (German: Deichhilfe), the draft of citizens by communities in the case of floodings and crevasse, and
- the Hand and hitch-up services (German: Hand- und Spanndienste) or, phrased in a more contemporary way, (mandatory) municipal services (German: Gemeindedienste), which are still enforced in small communities to maintain their infrastructure. This traditional regulation exists to reduce local taxes in local municipalities.

Political discussions and proposals

From time to time there are proposals for civil conscription of all citizens for general (social) services, that are considered to be legally problematic and could violate not only international agreements and the regulations of the German constitution as well, without a constitutional amendment. Those proposals are the establishment of a Soziales Pflichtjahr (German for "obligatory year of social service") or Bürgerarbeit (German for "citizens´ work"), a workfare-style draft for unemployed persons. In 2020, during the COVID-19 pandemic in Germany the state governments of Lower Saxony and North Rhine-Westphalia planned to establish a compulsory service for doctors and medical staff in the event of an epidemic and the legislative proposals were already in preparation. However, after protests by medical associations and other interest groups, the plans were ceased.

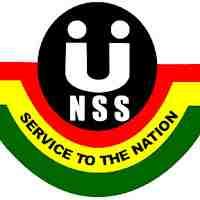
Logo of the Ghanaian National Service Secretariat

=== Ghana ===
In Ghana, students who graduate from accredited university are required by law to do a one-year national service to the country. The National Service Secretariat (NSS) is the Government of Ghana agency mandated to formulate policies and structures for national service. The mandatory civilian service can be fulfilled in youth programs, agriculture, health and local government institutions. There is currently no military conscription in Ghana.

=== Israel ===
In 1967, in connection with the Six-Day War, the Israeli Knesset passed the "Emergency Labor Service Act" to ensure the supply of essential goods and military equipment. In 1997 and 2020 in the wake of the COVID-19 pandemic, the law was repeatedly adapted. In the event of a crisis and the implementation of the "Emergency Labor Service Act", the law obliges every resident of Israel, with the exception of police officers, soldiers, pregnant women and mothers of babies, to a compulsory labor service in "essential companies". These essential companies are relevant to the security of the country or are maintaining basic services, such as electricity, water supply, communication and food supply. Employees must appear on time and can be transferred to other offices anytime.

=== Malaysia ===
The Constitution of Malaysia, Part II, article 6, states, that all forms of forced labor are prohibited, but parliament may by law provide a compulsory service for national purposes.

=== Nigeria ===
In Nigeria, there is no military conscription, but since 1973 graduates of Nigerian universities and polytechnics are required to serve in the mandatory National Youth Service Corps (NYSC). The Nigerian government wants to involve Nigerian graduates in nation building and the development of the country. The compulsory service lasts one year and graduates are ineligible for employment in governmental establishments (and most private establishments) until they have completed the mandatory service or obtained the relevant exemptions.

=== Rwanda ===
Umuganda is a national holiday in Rwanda taking place on the last Saturday of every month for mandatory nationwide community work from 08:00 to 11:00. Participation in umuganda is required by law, and failure to participate can result in a fine. The program was most recently re-established in 2009, and has resulted in notable improvement in the cleanliness of Rwanda.

=== Spain ===
During an estado de alarma, the "state of alarm", the Spanish government can impose civil conscription. This duty may extend to all or part of the national territory and to selective professional groups in the event of one of the following serious disturbances of normality:

- in case of serious risk, disaster or public accidents, such as earthquakes, floods, city and forest fires or serious accidents
- during health crises, such as epidemics, heavy pollution and environment disasters
- in case of shortage of basic necessities
- in case of interruptions of essential public services to the community

=== Sweden ===
Peace-time

The municipal rescue services are responsible for handling the majority of accidents that occur in Sweden, such as fires, traffic accidents, drowning incidents and releases of hazardous substances. The municipal rescue services have both full-time and part-time employees. In order to carry out its mission, the municipal rescue services also has the opportunity to use conscripted personnel, often organized into rescue guards (räddningsvärn).

Rescue guards can be located in places where it takes a long time for rescue stations with employed personnel to respond to an alarm, such as on islands and villages far from larger urban areas. Rescue guards can also be organized to reinforce municipal rescue services during extensive and long-term operations. The tasks that the rescue guards have are determined by the risks that exist in the municipality and how the municipal rescue service has chosen to organize its work. Based on the assignments the rescue guards have, its members are trained by the municipal rescue service to be able to perform their tasks efficiently.

War and emergencies

Civil conscription is, along with military conscription and general service conscription, part of the total defense duty that is mandatory for all residents of Sweden, male and female, from the 16th to the 70th years of age. This is an obligation to participate in activities required to prepare Sweden for war. The Swedish Government has decided to reintroduce short basic training for civilian conscripts in municipal emergency services and in operation and maintenance of electricity production and network operations. In 2025, the government tasked the National Board of Health and Welfare with planning the introduction of civilian conscription for the health and medical care services. The aim is to strengthen the healthcare sector's capacity in times of war and emergencies.

To increase Sweden's ability to plan and strengthen personnel supply within the total defense, civilian conscription was in 2024 activated for the emergency services. The Swedish Civil Contingencies Agency is in charge of assessing the individuals that will be inducted as civilian conscript in the municipal rescue services. The civilian conscripts must complete refresher training and will then be posted as a civilian in the municipal war-time resque organization by the Swedish Defence Conscription and Assessment Agency, either as a rescue worker or as a rescue officer. The assignment will be adapted to the conscript's qualifications and skills. The mandatory refresher course is ten days long and takes place at the training centers at Revinge and Sandö.

The Swedish Power-Grid Agency is in charge of training 1,000 civilian conscripts for the electricity supply sector during the period 2025–2028. The civilian conscripts will be posted for repair duty in the electrical grid organization and will become an important reinforcement resource during emergencies and war.

=== Switzerland ===
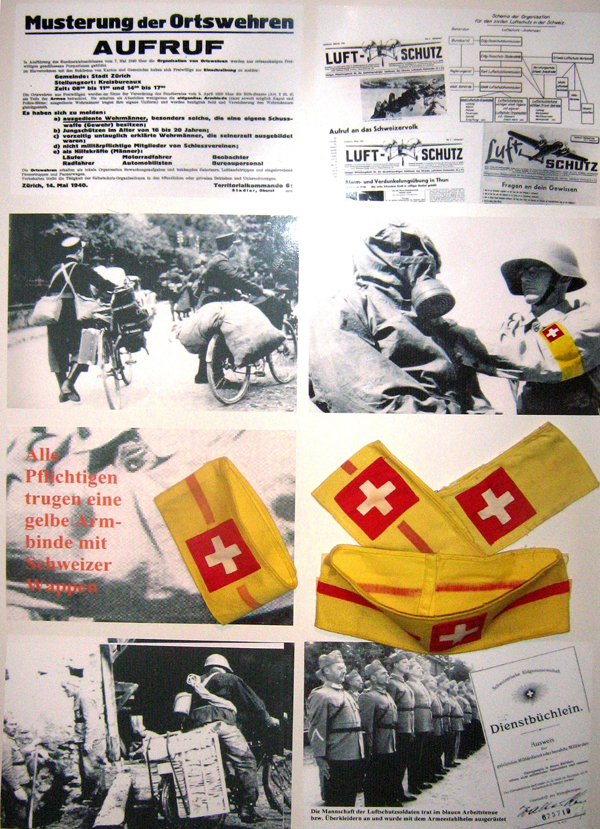
Poster of the Swiss Civil Defense Museum

In general, the political system in Switzerland is characterized by the so-called militia-system, where civilian service tasks basically are carried out on a part-time basis, on voluntary or mandatory basis. Currently, not only the compulsory military service in the Swiss Armed Forces is backed on the militia-system, many political and civilian service duties are maintained by the militia secondary activity. For example, members of cantonal or federal parliaments or governments in general engage on part-time basis.

Compulsory civil defense service

The duty in Swiss civil defense and protection institutions is mandatory for inhabitants as well.

Corvées communales

In the canton of Fribourg, in some municipalities a compulsory community service is in force, such as the municipalities of Châtillon or Auboranges (until 2025). Depending on the municipal regulations, either homeowners or the entire adult population are obliged to work a few days a year for the municipality. Those corvées communales are services to reduce municipal taxes, that obliges community citizens to do certain physical work. Anyone who does not participate must pay an additional fee.

Mandatory fire service

Unlike to the organization of fire brigades in most countries as professional or voluntary fire departments, in Switzerland there are basically militia fire brigades, compulsory fire brigades with drafted members.

=== United Kingdom ===
The British overseas territory of Pitcairn Islands, which has a population of about 50 and no income or sales tax, has a system of "public work" whereby all able-bodied people are required to perform, when called upon, jobs such as road maintenance and repairs to public buildings.

== Former civil conscriptions ==
=== Belgium ===
To prevent a doctors strike the Belgium government, in April 1964, issued a civil mobilization order for hospital doctors and military doctors.

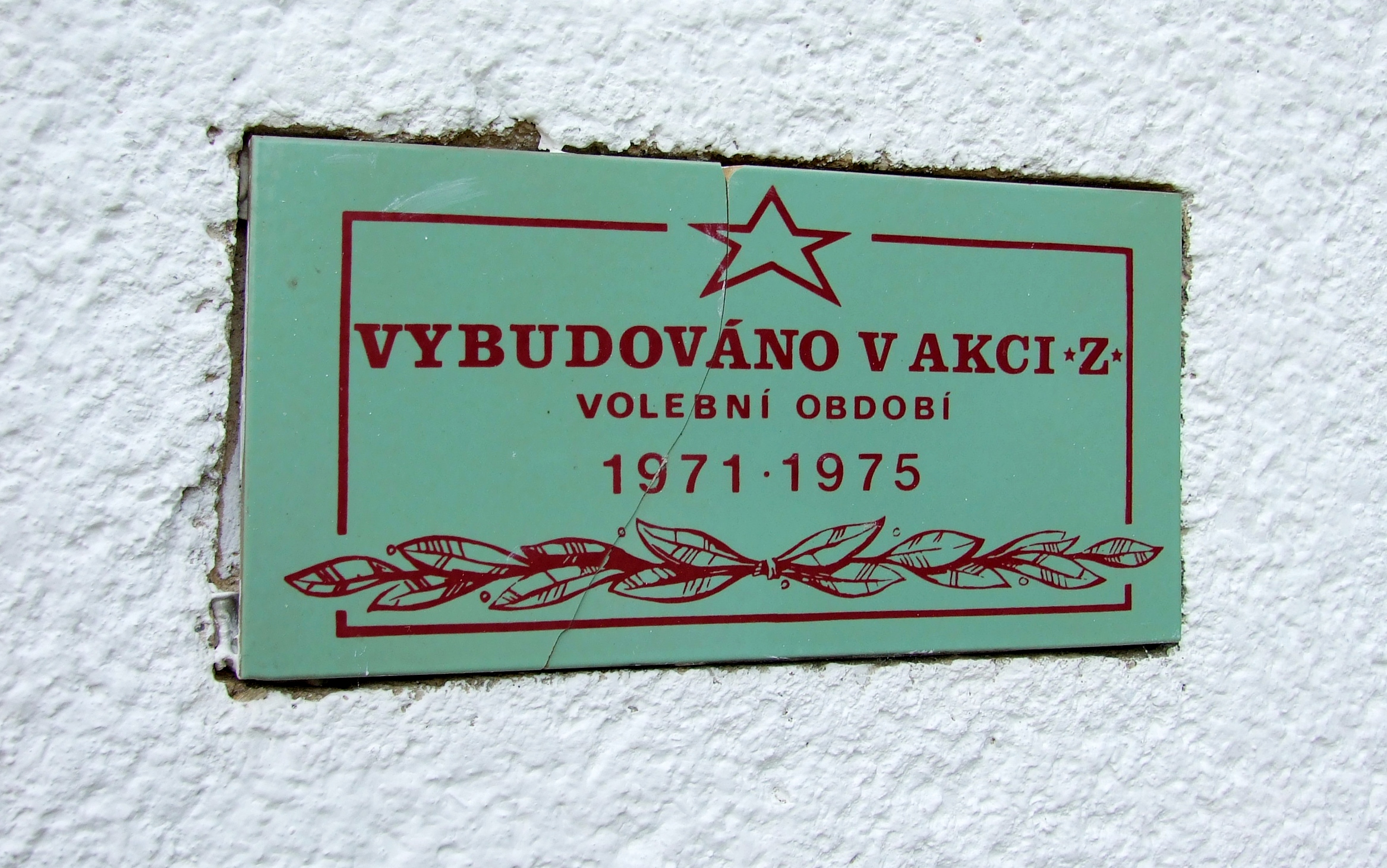
A plaque that says that the building was constructed in course of Akce Z in Czechoslovakia.

=== Czechoslovakia ===
During the communist rule in Czechoslovakia the government announced a non-remunerated activity programme called Action Z (in Czech: Akce Z ) for the population. Officially, it was a voluntary work, but in fact it was mandatory. The participation at the Action Z programme was documented and citizens who did not participate or whose participation was unsatisfactory, were threatened with consequences at their regular work.

Coat of arms of the Zivilverteidigung.

=== East Germany ===
In East Germany, the officially volunteer Subbotnik service was de facto obligatory the population. With this service, the local communities helped in the maintenance of local infrastructure.

By legislation, if necessary it was possible to draft civilians to the Civil Defense Force in East Germany.

=== Greece ===
In Greece, the introduction of civil conscription, called "political mobilization", was made possible by law in 1974 and several governments have made use of it.

The years 1979 - 1990

As early as 1979, bank employees and several times in the 1980s and 1990s employees of traffic and transport companies were obliged to perform work.

The debt crisis 2010 - 2014

Due to the Greek debt crisis from 2010 to 2014, certain professional groups were made subject to civil conscription in order to provide public services as a national interest. For example, truck drivers, employees of transport companies, employees of municipalities and teachers were obliged to perform at work.

Civil conscription during the debt crisis in Greece:
Year	Workers
2010	Truck drivers
2011	Municipal cleaning staff
2013	Workers in Athens metro, tram and electric railway
2013	Maritime workers
2013	High school teachers
2014	Electricity power workers

Abolition of civil conscription in 2015

Due to the fact, that civil conscription was very unpopular, the government under the ruling party Syriza abolished civil conscription in 2015.

COVID-19 pandemic

Although civil conscription was abolished, the parliament again created a legal basis during the COVID-19 pandemic in Greece in 2020. Based on the new law, freelance doctors were required to serve in state hospitals in March 2021.

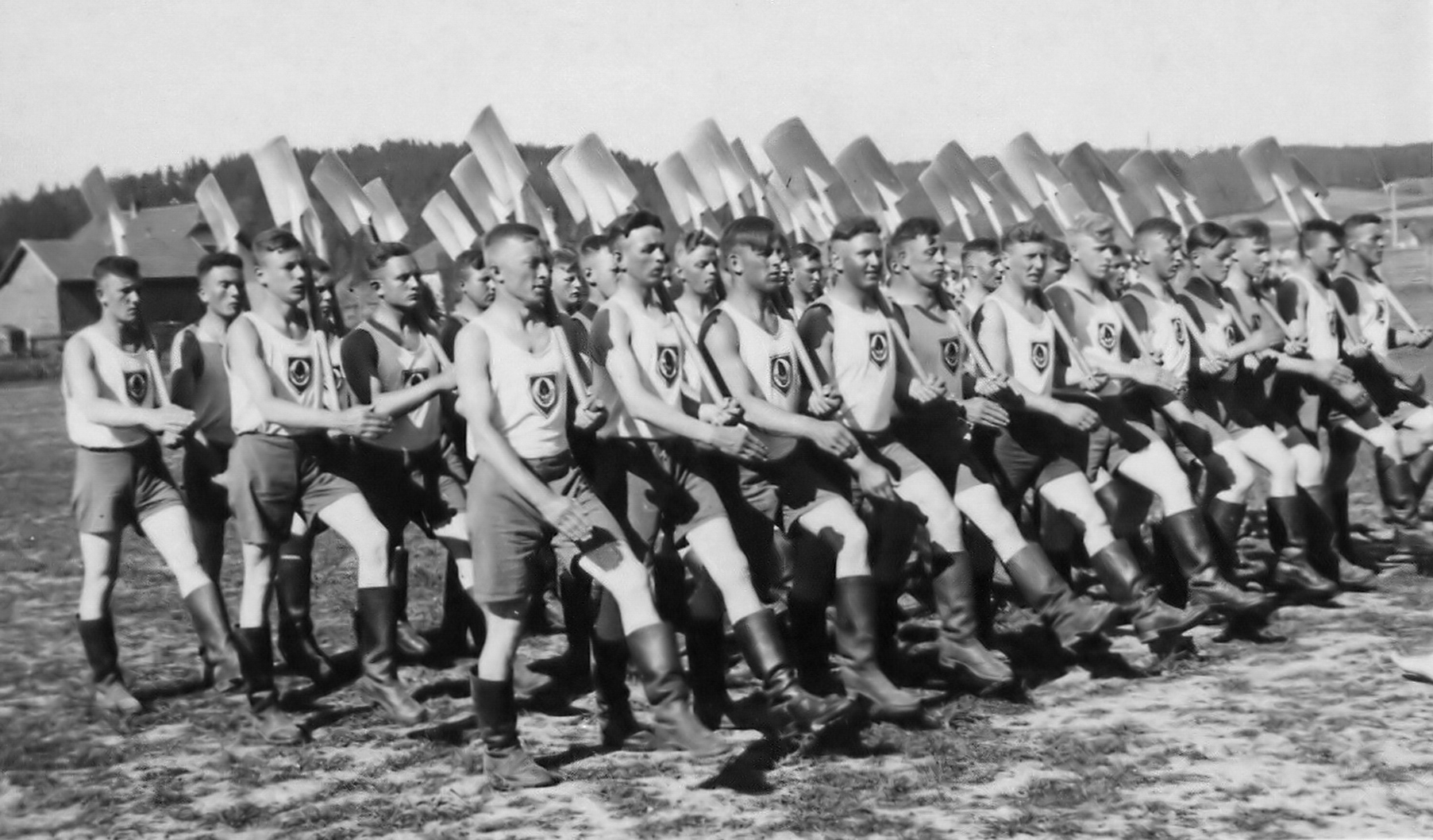
Reich Labour Service of Nazi-Germany in 1940

=== Nazi Germany ===
Apart from the use of forced labour under German rule during World War II for millions of people, the Nazi German government ordered compulsory work of the civilian population as well, as a part of Nazi labor market policy and to spread Nazi propaganda. As early as 1934 all students leaving school after 8 years were obliged to join the Landjahr (countryside year) for labour in agriculture. In addition to that it was compulsory for women until the age of 25 to serve the Pflichtjahr (compulsory year), which was basically in the field of housekeeping. Starting in 1935 the Reich Labour Service was mandatory for all male citizens.

=== Seychelles ===
The National Youth Service (NYS) was a youth service program implemented in 1981 by the government of Seychelles that lasted two years until 1991, when it was reduced to a period of one year. It was a formerly compulsory civil service and included traditional educational curriculum, political education and paramilitary training. The Seychellois opposition opposed the program on the grounds, that it allegedly indoctrinated young adults with the ruling Seychelles People's Progressive Front's socialist ideology and that it rarely allowed its participants to visit their families. This mandatory service was ceased in November 1998.

=== Slovakia ===
Due to the severe course of the COVID-19 pandemic in Slovakia, the state of emergency was declared in September 2020 by the government under the leadership of Slovak Prime Minister Igor Matovič. Among others legal rights, the government obliged medical personnel to work and to be transferred to other medical facilities. The right to strike was revoked.

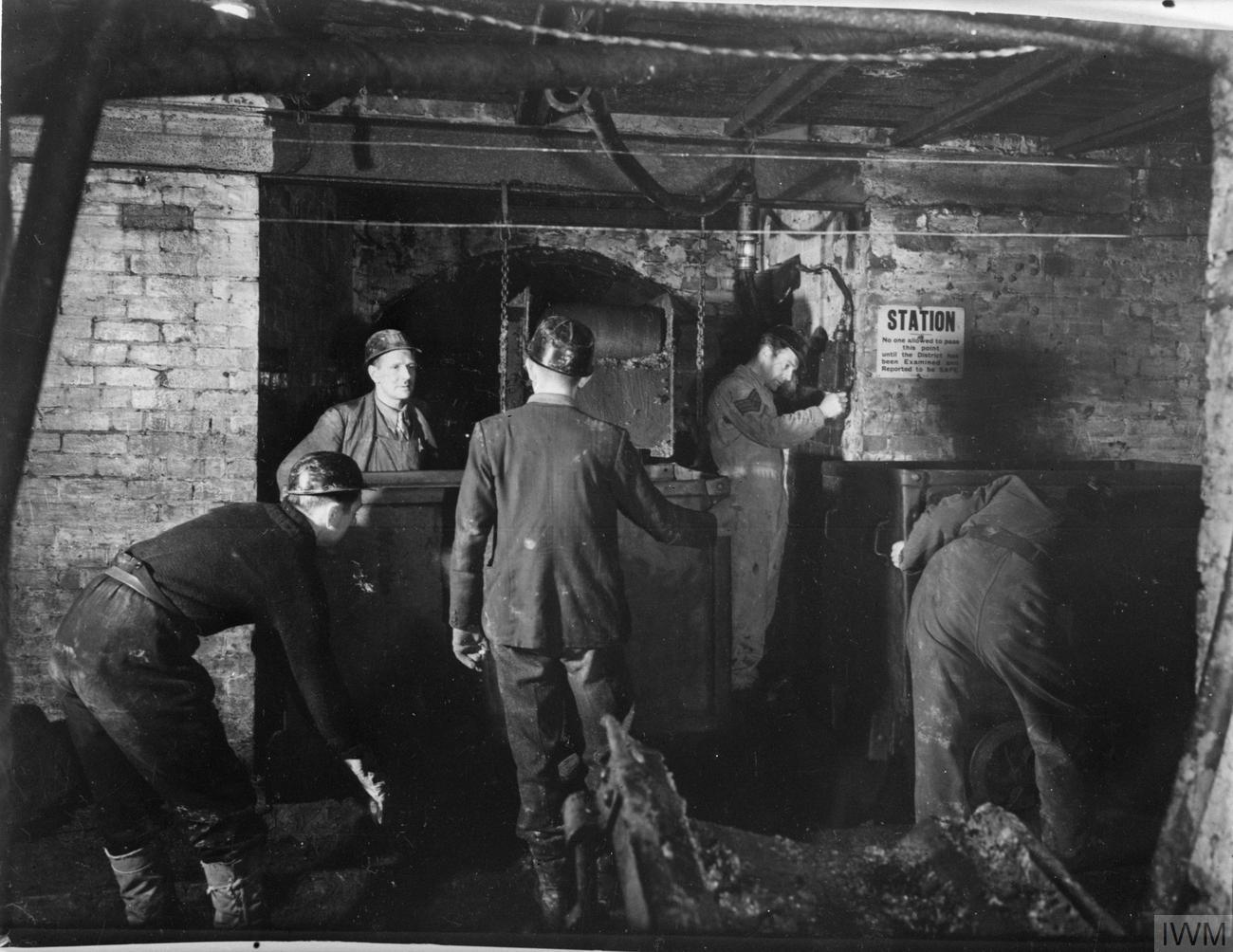
Bevin Boys receiving training from an experienced miner at Ollerton, Nottinghamshire, February 1945

=== Spain ===
In Spain, during an estado de alarma, the "state of alarm", the Spanish government can impose civil conscription. This state of emergency has been declared to conscript different professional groups since the end of Francoist Spain a few times:

- December 4, 2010 until January 16, 2011, due to the Spanish air traffic controllers strike, air traffic control personnel was conscripted to fulfill their duties.
- March 14, 2020 until June 21, 2020, due to the COVID-19 pandemic in Spain to conscript medical personnel.

=== United Kingdom ===
Due to a labour shortage between December 1943 and March 1948, because of World War II and the aftermath, the British government started to draft civil conscripts, the so-called Bevin Boys, for the work in coal mines.

== See also ==
- Community service
- Corvée
- Himeyuri Students
- National service
- Workfare
