= Fire department =

Organization that provides firefighting services

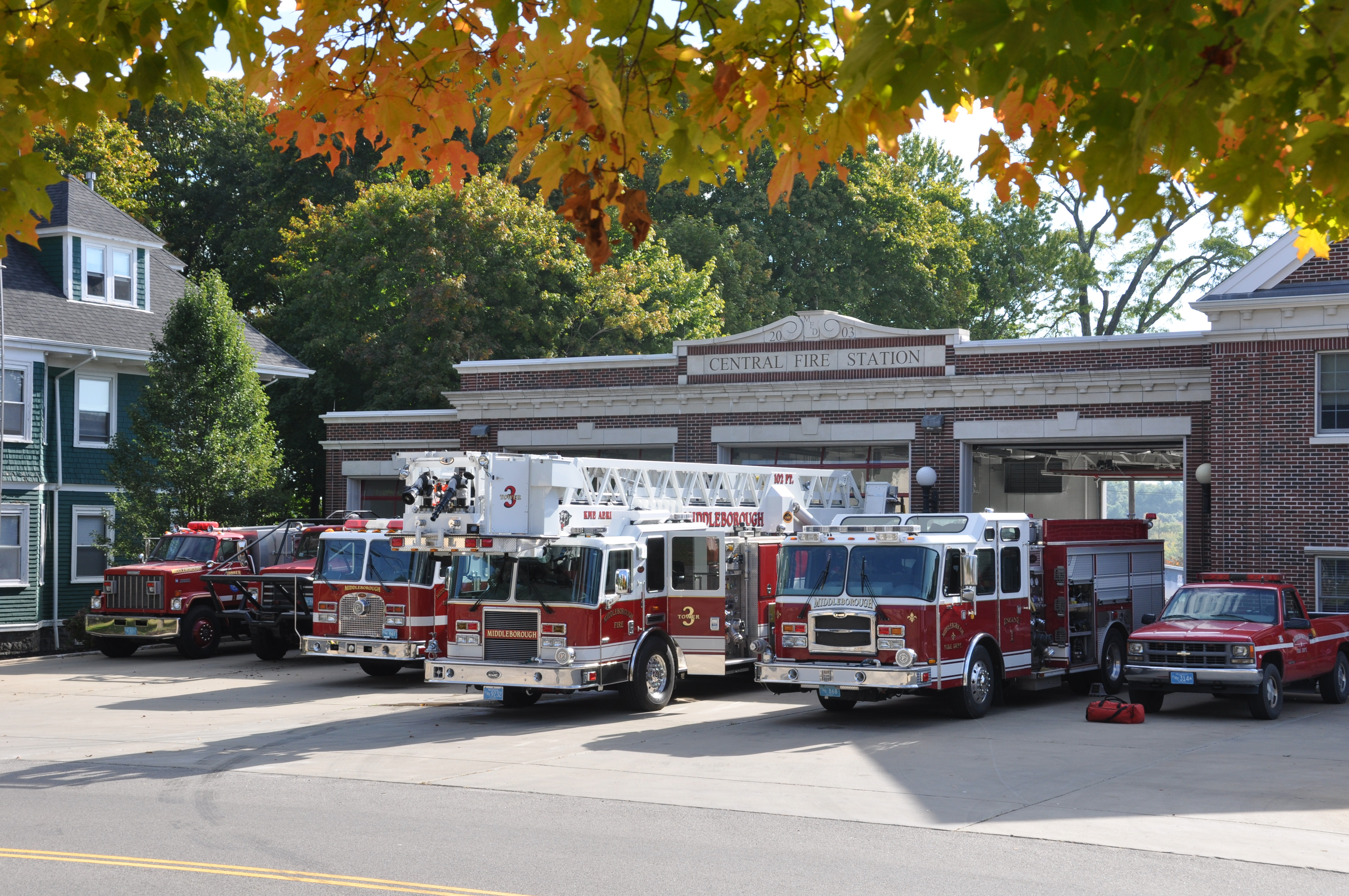
Fire department vehicles outside a fire station in Middleborough, Massachusetts, United States

A fire department (North American English) or fire brigade (Commonwealth English), also known as a fire company, fire authority, fire district, fire and rescue, fire force, or fire service in some areas, is an organization that provides fire prevention and fire suppression services as well as other rescue services.

Fire departments are most commonly a public sector organization that operates within a municipality, county, state, nation, or special district. Private and specialist firefighting organizations also exist, such as those for aircraft rescue and firefighting.

A fire department contains one or more fire stations within its boundaries, and may be staffed by firefighters, who may be professional, volunteers, conscripts, or on-call. Combination fire departments employ a mix of professional and volunteer firefighters. In some countries, fire departments may also run an ambulance service, staffed by volunteer or professional EMS personnel.

== Organization ==
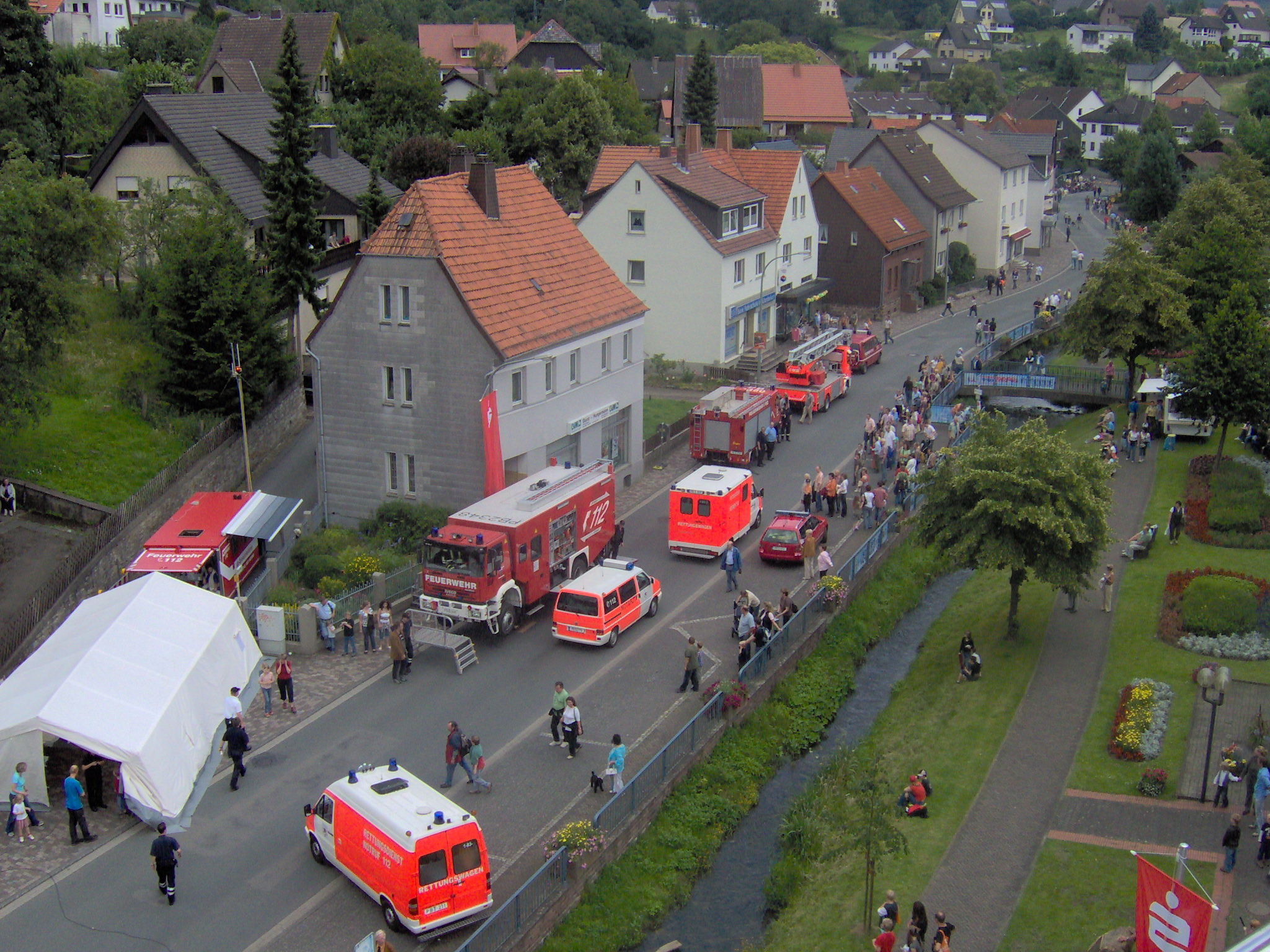
Aerial photograph of a public display by the German Fire Services

Fire departments are organized in a system of administration, services, training, and operations; for example:

- Administration is responsible for supervision, budgets, policy, and human resources.
- Service offers protection, safety, and education to the public.
- Training prepares people with the knowledge and skills to perform their duties.
- Operations performs tasks to mitigate harm to persons, property, and the environment.

A fire service is normally set up where it can have fire stations, fire engines and other relevant equipment strategically deployed throughout the area it serves, so that dispatchers can send fire engines, fire trucks, or ambulances from the fire stations closest to the incident. Larger departments have branches within themselves to increase efficiency, composed of volunteers, support, and research.

- Volunteers give additional support to the department in a state of emergency.
- Support organizing the resources within and outside of the department.
- Research is to give advantages in new technologies for the department.

=== Jurisdiction ===
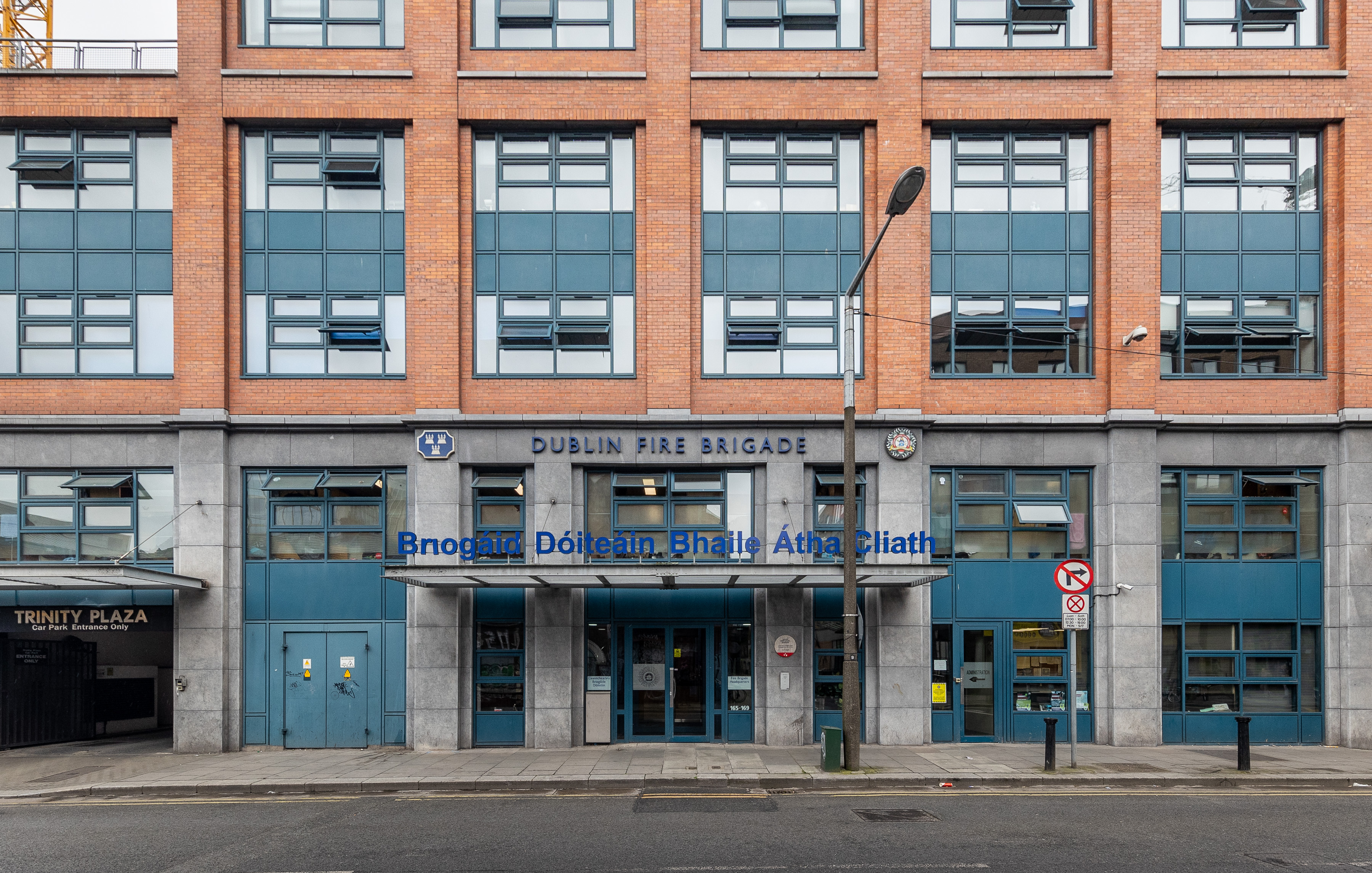
Dublin Fire Brigade headquarters, Ireland

Most places are covered by a public sector fire department, which is established by a local or national government and funded by taxation. Even volunteer fire departments may still receive some government funding. There is more to the costs of staffing, training, equipment, and maintenance than just salaries because there are costs associated with “fire apparatus” and “protective gear”, that are all factors of “the real cost of operating a fire department,” which are critical to keeping a department ready to respond.

The typical size of a fire department varies greatly by country. In the United States, firefighting is usually organized on a municipal level. Some municipalities belong to "fire protection districts" that are served by the same fire department, such as the San Ramon Valley Fire Protection District in California. Austria, Germany and Canada also organize fire services at a municipal level. In France, fire services mostly cover one department. In the United Kingdom, most fire services cover one or more counties, while Scotland and Northern Ireland each have a single fire service. In Australia, state governments run the fire services, although three states have separate agencies for metropolitan and rural areas. Poland, the Czech Republic, Israel, Italy, New Zealand, and the Philippines have national fire and rescue services.

=== Responsibilities ===
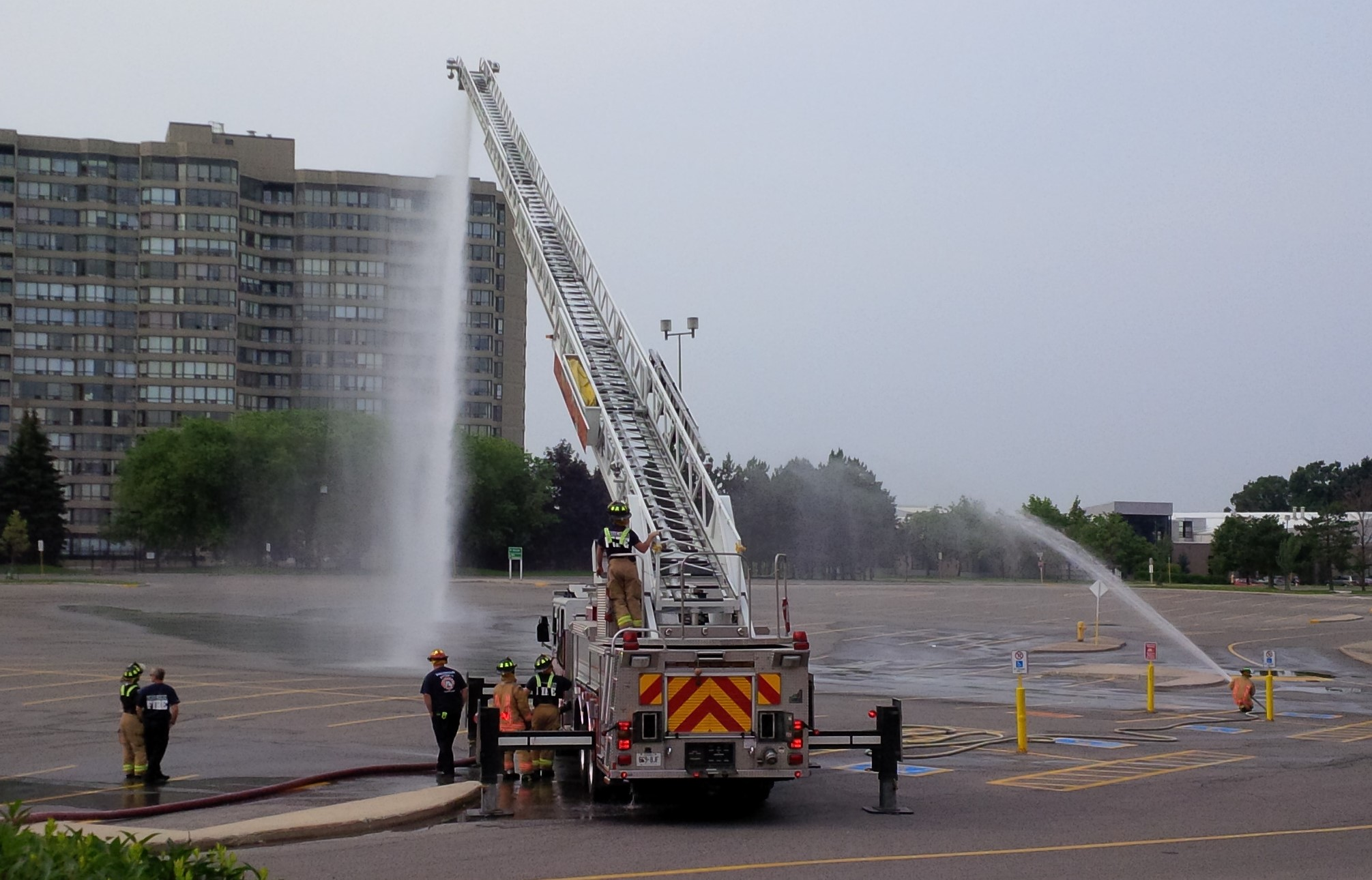
Firefighters taking part in a training exercise in Vaughan, Ontario, Canada

Fire departments may also provide other, more specialized emergency services, such as aircraft rescue and firefighting, hazardous materials response, technical rescue, search and rescue, and wildland firefighting.

In some countries or regions (e.g., the United States, Germany, Japan, Hong Kong, Macau), fire departments can be responsible for providing emergency medical services. The EMS personnel may either be cross-trained as firefighters or a separate division of emergency medical technicians (EMTs) and paramedics. While some services act only as "first responders" to medical emergencies, stabilizing victims until an ambulance can arrive, other fire services also operate ambulance services.

=== International organization and services ===
In Australia, The New South Wales Rural Fire Service is a major example of a Fire service formed by local geography and wildfire risk. It describes itself as the world’s largest volunteer fire service, with more than 70,000 Volunteering, and responds to bush and grass fires, structure fires, road accidents, storms, floods, and searches. This demonstrates the wider role that some rural and volunteer-based fire services perform in areas where large territories and seasonal Wildfire hazards require strong community participation.

In Japan, fire services are primarily the responsibility of municipalities and include both regular fire departments and volunteer fire corps The National Fire and Disaster Management Agency states that these organizations operate under municipal authority and are responsible for firefighting and rescue operations but also for ambulance services. This makes emergency medical response a major part of the Japanese fire service system.

Singapore uses a more centralized model through the Singapore Civil Defence Force, which serves as the national authority for civil emergencies. According to SCDF, it is responsible for firefighting, rescue, emergency medical services, fire safety regulations, and civil defense shelter matters. This structure differs from systems that divide responsibilities mainly among local departments and shows how fire services may also be integrated into wider national emergency management functions.

In the United Kingdom, fire and rescue services are generally organized through local fire and rescue authorities, although governance arrangements vary by area. The national framework for England states that these authorities must ensure the provision of core functions required by law, including responding to fires and other emergencies. Guidance for fire and rescue authorizes also stresses responsibilities such as protecting life and property, responding to road traffic collisions, and rescuing people from other emergencies. This expresses a model in which services are locally governed but still guided by national law and policy.

== History ==
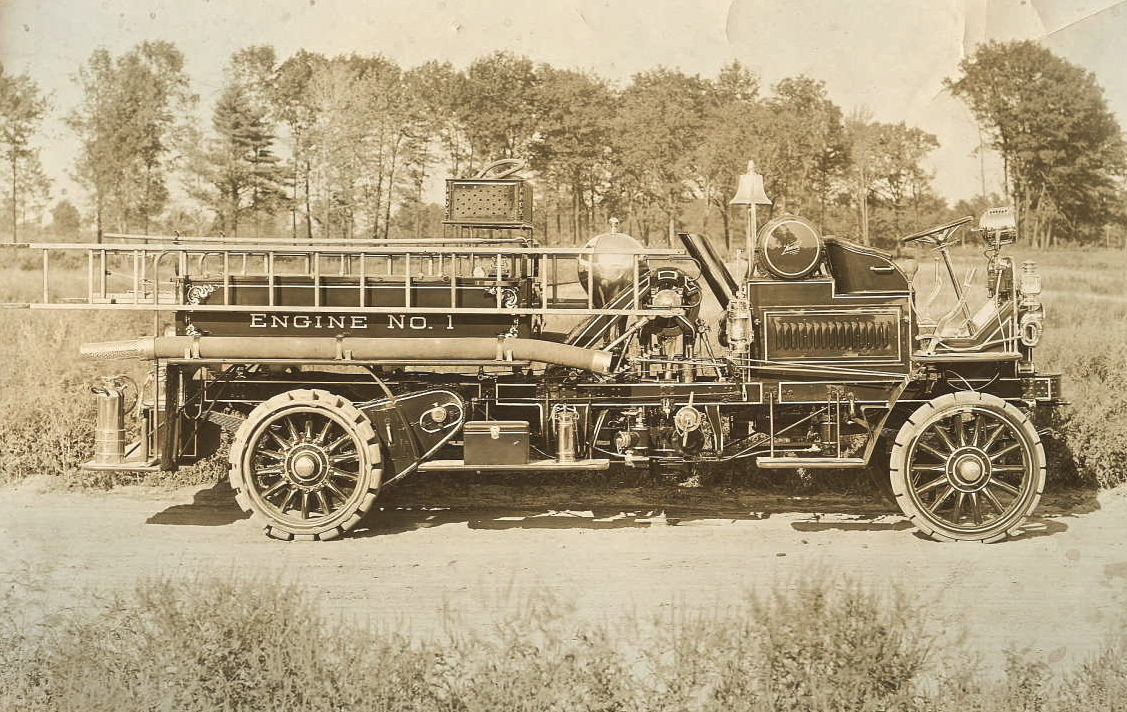
Knox Automobile produced the first modern fire engine in 1905

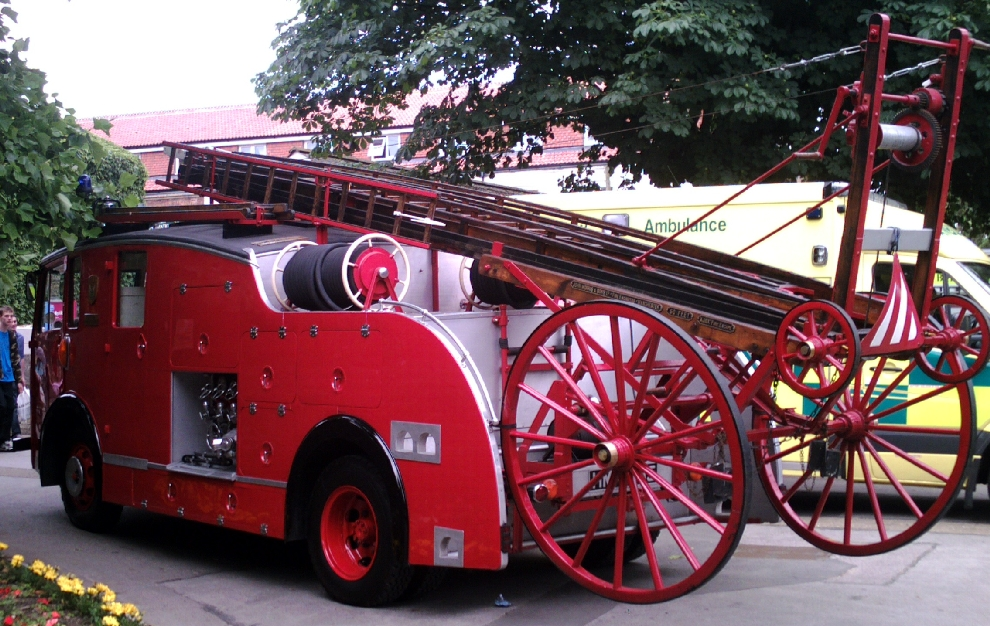
A 1951 Dennis P12 fire tender as formerly used by the Wiltshire Fire Brigade in England

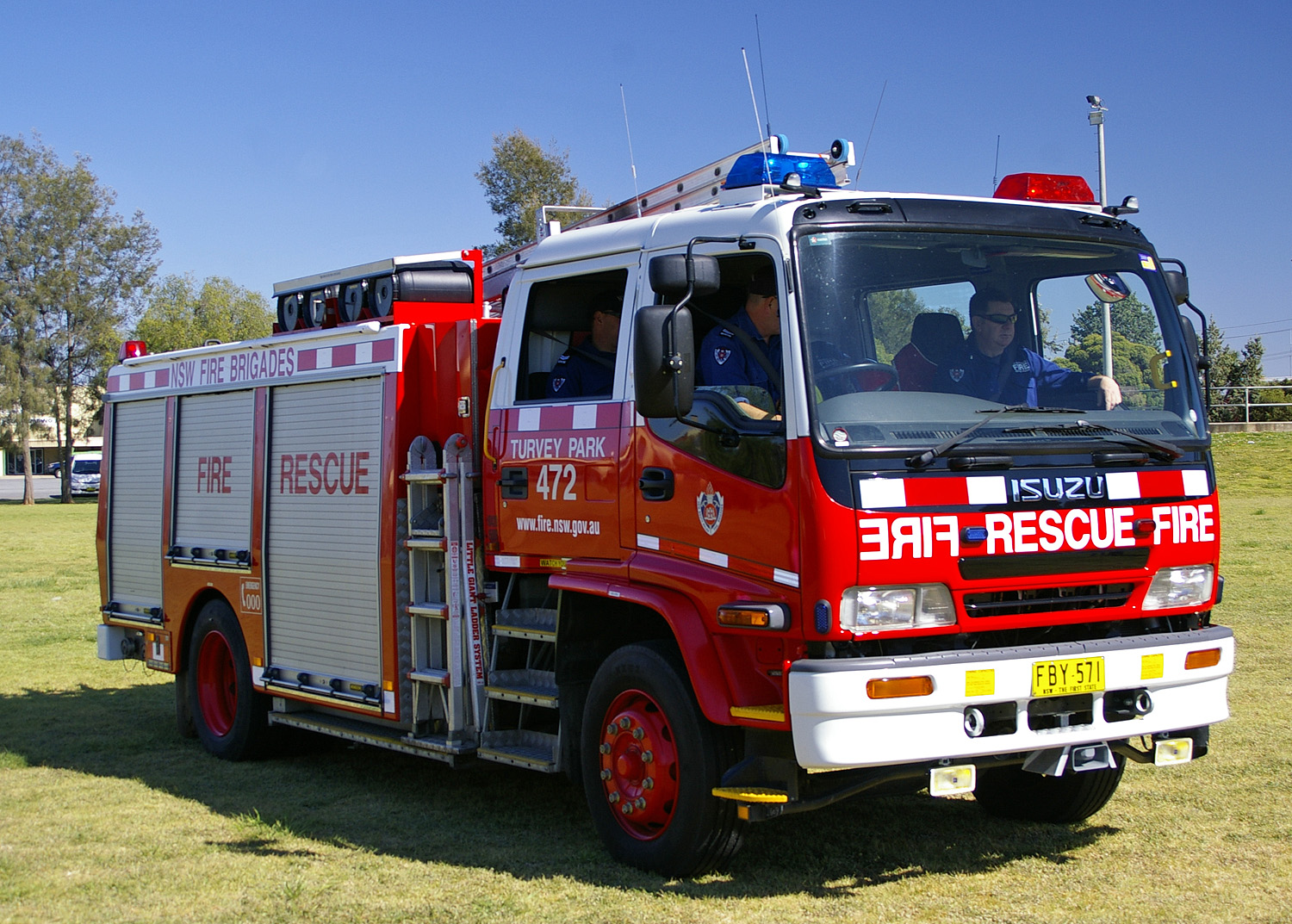
A Fire and Rescue NSW truck in 2008

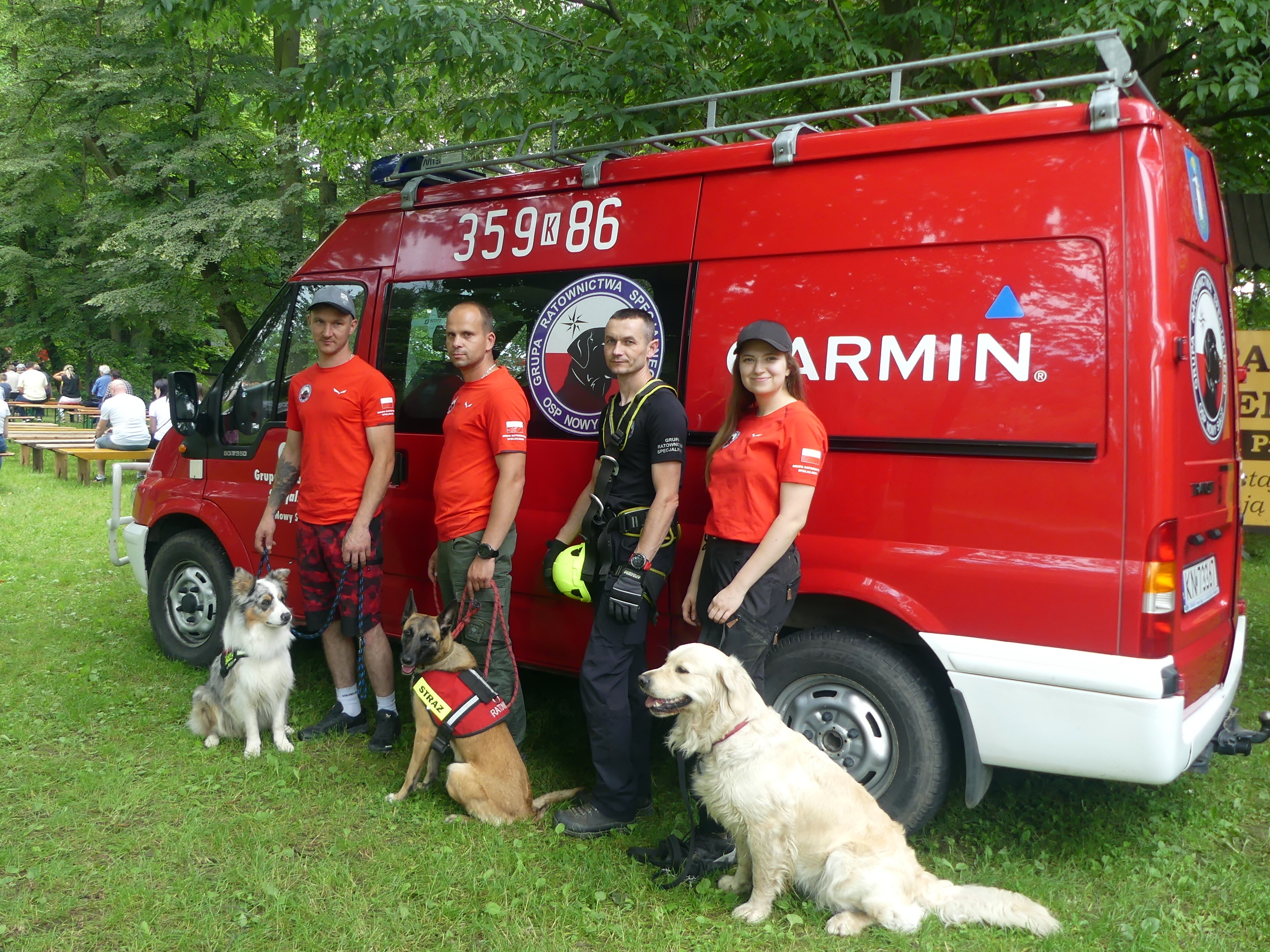
Polish Firefighters from Nowy Sącz, Special Rescue Group with rescue dogs

=== Ancient Rome ===
The earliest known firefighting service was formed in Ancient Rome by Marcus Egnatius Rufus who used his slaves to provide a free fire service. These men fought fires using bucket chains and also patrolled the streets with the authority to impose corporal punishment upon those who violated fire-prevention codes. The Emperor Augustus established a public fire department in 24 BC, composed of 600 slaves distributed amongst seven fire stations in Rome.

=== 1600s and 1700s ===
Fire departments were again formed by property insurance companies beginning in the 17th century after the Great Fire of London in 1666. The first insurance brigades were established the following year. Others began to realize that much money could be made from this practice, and ten more insurance companies set up in London before 1832: The Alliance, Atlas, Globe, Imperial, London, Protector, Royal Exchange, Sun Union and Westminster. Each company had its own fire mark, a durable plaque that would be affixed to the building exterior. Although a popular legend says a company's fire brigade would not extinguish a burning building if it did not have the correct fire mark, there is little evidence to support this; evidence shows insurance companies required their firefighters to fight every fire they encountered.

Amsterdam also had a sophisticated firefighting system in the late 17th century, under the direction of artist Jan van der Heyden, who had improved the designs of both fire hoses and fire pumps.

The city of Boston, Massachusetts established America's first publicly funded, paid fire department in 1678.

Fire insurance made its debut in the American colonies in South Carolina in 1736, but it was Benjamin Franklin who imported the London model of insurance. He established the colonies' first fire insurance company in Philadelphia named the Philadelphia Contributionship, as well as its associated Union Volunteer Fire Company, which was an unpaid (volunteer) company.

A document dated 1686 informs about the payment system of four so-called "fire servants" (German: Feuerknecht) in Vienna, which is the official founding year of the Vienna Fire Department.

In 1754, Halifax, Nova Scotia established the Halifax Regional Fire and Emergency, which is today Canada's oldest fire department.

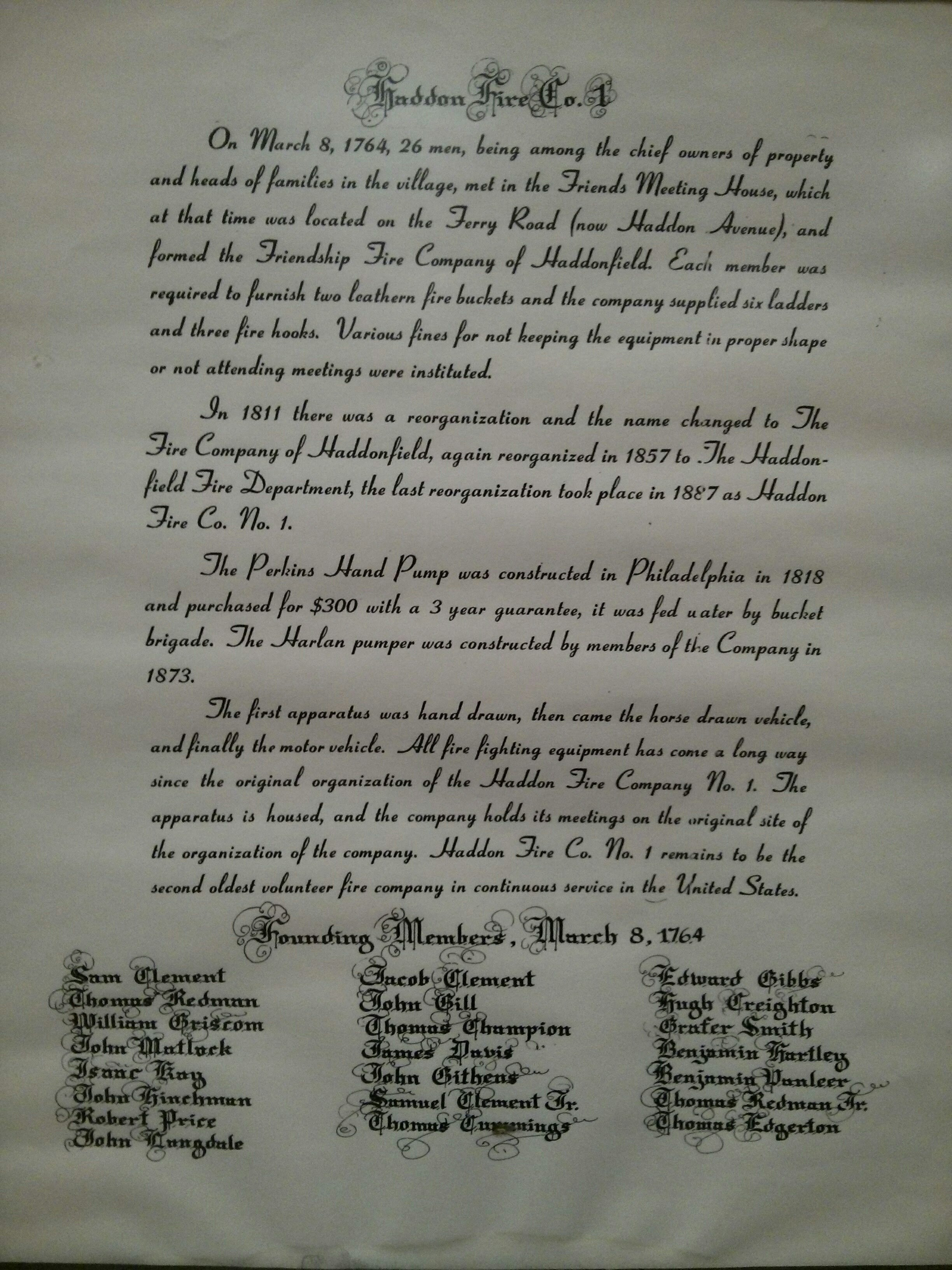
Plaque with the history of the department in Haddonfield, New Jersey

In 1764, Haddonfield, New Jersey established the second-oldest fire company in the United States.

Another early American fire department, staffed by unpaid volunteers, was established in the city of Petersburg, Virginia in 1773.

=== 1800s ===
In the 19th century, cities began to form their own fire departments as a civil service to the public, obliging private fire companies to shut down, many merging their fire stations into the city's fire department. In 1833, London's ten independent brigades all merged to form the London Fire Engine Establishment (LFEE), with James Braidwood as the Chief Officer. Braidwood had previously been the fire chief in Edinburgh, where the world's first municipal fire service was founded in 1824, and he is now regarded, along with Van der Heyden, as one of founders of modern firefighting. The LFEE then was incorporated into the city's Metropolitan Fire Brigade in 1865 under Eyre Massey Shaw.

In 1879, the University of Notre Dame established the first University-based fire department in the United States.

=== 1900s ===
The first motorized fire department was organized in 1906 in Springfield, Massachusetts, where Knox Automobile had developed the first modern fire engine one year earlier.

== See also ==
- International Firefighters' Day
- Compulsory fire service
- Emergency service
- Fire engine
- List of fire departments
- Volunteer fire department
- Fire department ranks by country
