= Free trade =

Absence of government restriction on international trade

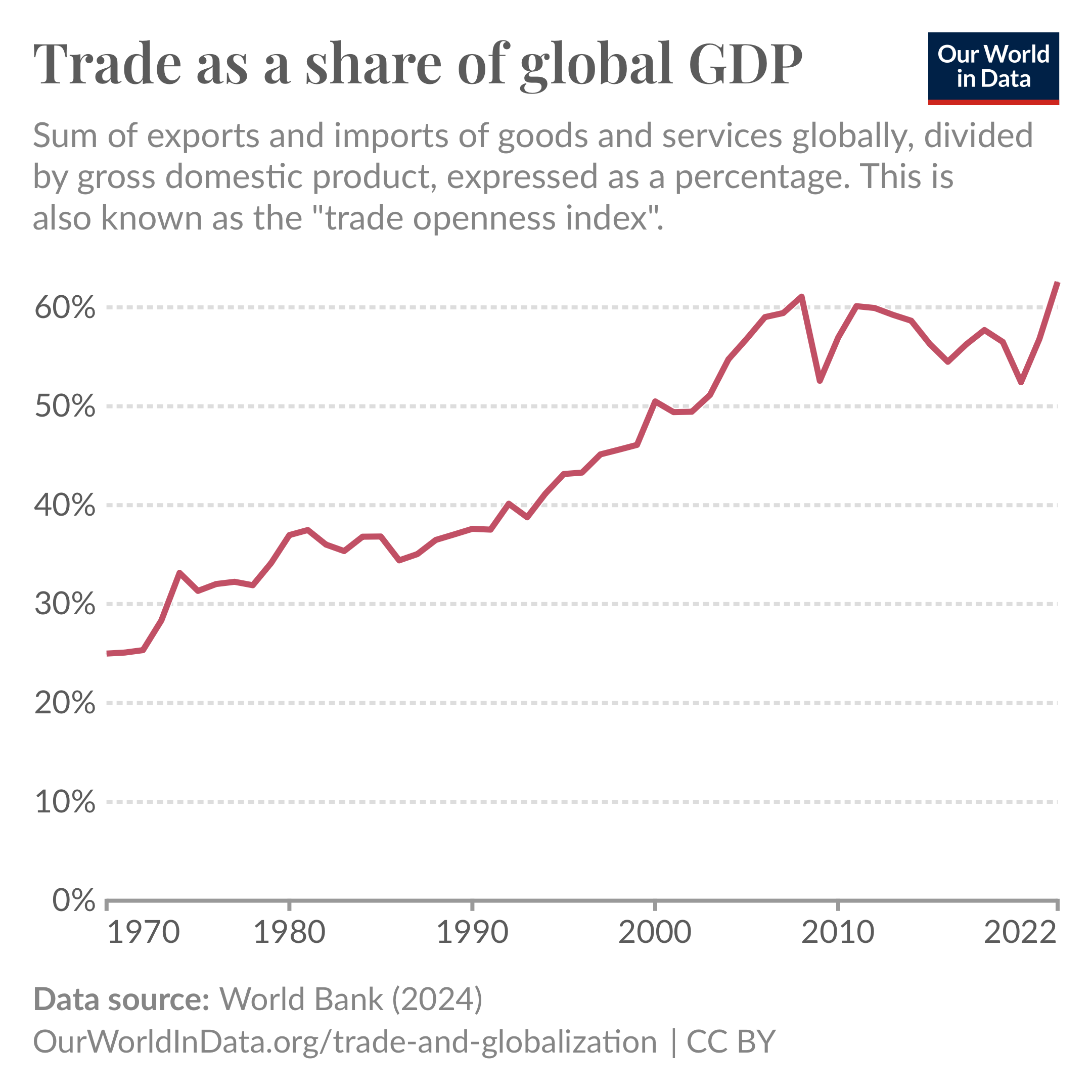
Trade as a share of global GDP (openness index).

Free trade is a trade policy that does not restrict imports or exports through legal barriers. In government, free trade is predominantly advocated by political parties that hold economically liberal positions, while economic nationalist political parties (usually on the left of the political spectrum) generally support protectionism, the opposite of free trade.

Most nations today are members of the World Trade Organization multilateral trade agreements. States can unilaterally reduce regulations and duties on imports and exports, as well as form bilateral and multilateral free trade agreements. Free trade areas between groups of countries, such as the European Economic Area and the Mercosur open markets, establish a free trade zone among members while creating a protectionist barrier between that free trade area and the rest of the world. Most governments still impose some protectionist policies that are intended to support local industry growth and employment, such as applying tariffs to imports or subsidies to exports. Governments may also restrict free trade to limit exports of natural resources. Other barriers that may hinder trade include import quotas, taxes and non-tariff barriers, such as regulatory legislation.

Historically, openness to free trade substantially increased from 1815 to the outbreak of World War I. Trade openness increased again during the 1920s, but collapsed (in particular in Europe and North America) during the Great Depression. Trade openness increased substantially again from the 1950s onwards (albeit with a slowdown during the 1973 oil crisis). Economists and economic historians contend that current levels of trade openness are the highest they have ever been.

Economists are generally supportive of free trade. There is a broad consensus among economists that protectionism has a negative effect on economic growth and economic welfare while free trade and the reduction of trade barriers has a positive effect on economic growth and economic stability. However, in the short run, liberalization of trade can cause unequally distributed losses and the economic dislocation of workers in import-competing sectors.

== Features ==
Free trade is characterised by certain principles such as unregulated access to markets and to market information. Taxes, subsidies, regulations, or laws that give some firms, households, or factors of production an advantage over others are often considered to be "trade-distorting" policies that contradict the free trade theory. In a free trade economy, firms cannot distort markets through government-imposed monopoly or oligopoly power. Advocates for free trade strongly encourage pro-free trade trade agreements.

== Economics ==
=== Economic models ===
Two simple ways to understand the proposed benefits of free trade are through David Ricardo's theory of comparative advantage and by analyzing the impact of a tariff or import quota. An economic analysis using the law of supply and demand and the economic effects of a tax can be used to show the theoretical benefits and disadvantages of free trade.

Most economists would recommend that even developing nations should set their tariff rates quite low, but the economist Ha-Joon Chang, a proponent of industrial policy, believes higher levels may be justified in developing nations because the productivity gap between them and developed nations today is much higher than what developed nations faced when they were at a similar level of technological development. Underdeveloped nations today, Chang believes, are weak players in a much more competitive system. Counterarguments to Chang's point of view are that the developing countries are able to adopt technologies from abroad whereas developed nations had to create new technologies themselves and that developing countries can sell to export markets far richer than any that existed in the 19th century.

If the chief justification for a tariff is to stimulate infant industries, it must be high enough to allow domestic manufactured goods to compete with imported goods in order to be successful. This theory, known as import substitution industrialization, is largely considered ineffective for currently developing nations.

==== Tariffs ====
The light red regions are the net loss to society caused by the existence of the tariff.

The chart at the right analyzes the effect of the imposition of an import tariff on some imaginary good. Prior to the tariff, the price of the good in the world market and hence in the domestic market is P_{world}. The tariff increases the domestic price to P_{tariff}. The higher price causes domestic production to increase from Q_{S1} to Q_{S2} and causes domestic consumption to decline from Q_{C1} to Q_{C2}.

This has three effects on societal welfare. Consumers are made worse off because the consumer surplus (green region) becomes smaller. Producers are better off because the producer surplus (yellow region) is made larger. The government also has additional tax revenue (blue region). However, the loss to consumers is greater than the gains by producers and the government. The magnitude of this societal loss is shown by the two pink triangles. Removing the tariff and having free trade would be a net gain for society.

An almost identical analysis of this tariff from the perspective of a net producing country yields parallel results. From that country's perspective, the tariff leaves producers worse off and consumers better off, but the net loss to producers is larger than the benefit to consumers (there is no tax revenue in this case because the country being analyzed is not collecting the tariff). Under similar analysis, export tariffs, import quotas and export quotas all yield nearly identical results.

Sometimes consumers are better off and producers worse off and sometimes consumers are worse off and producers are better off, but the imposition of trade restrictions causes a net loss to society because the losses from trade restrictions are larger than the gains from trade restrictions. Free trade creates winners and losers, but theory and empirical evidence show that the gains from free trade are larger than the losses.

A 2021 study found that across 151 countries over the period 1963–2014, "tariff increases are associated with persistent, economically and statistically significant declines in domestic output and productivity, as well as higher unemployment and inequality, real exchange rate appreciation, and insignificant changes to the trade balance."

==== Technology and innovation ====
Economic models indicate that free trade leads to greater technology adoption and innovation.

==== Productivity and welfare ====
A 2023 study in Journal of Political Economy found that reductions in trade costs since 1980 caused increases in agricultural productivity, food consumption and welfare across the world. The welfare gains were particularly large in some developing countries.

=== Trade diversion ===
According to mainstream economics theory, the selective application of free trade agreements to some countries and tariffs on others can lead to economic inefficiency through the process of trade diversion. It is efficient for a good to be produced by the country which is the lowest cost producer, but this does not always take place if a high cost producer has a free trade agreement while the low cost producer faces a high tariff. Applying free trade to the high cost producer and not the low cost producer as well can lead to trade diversion and a net economic loss. This reason is why many economists place such high importance on negotiations for global tariff reductions, such as the Doha Round.

== Opinions ==
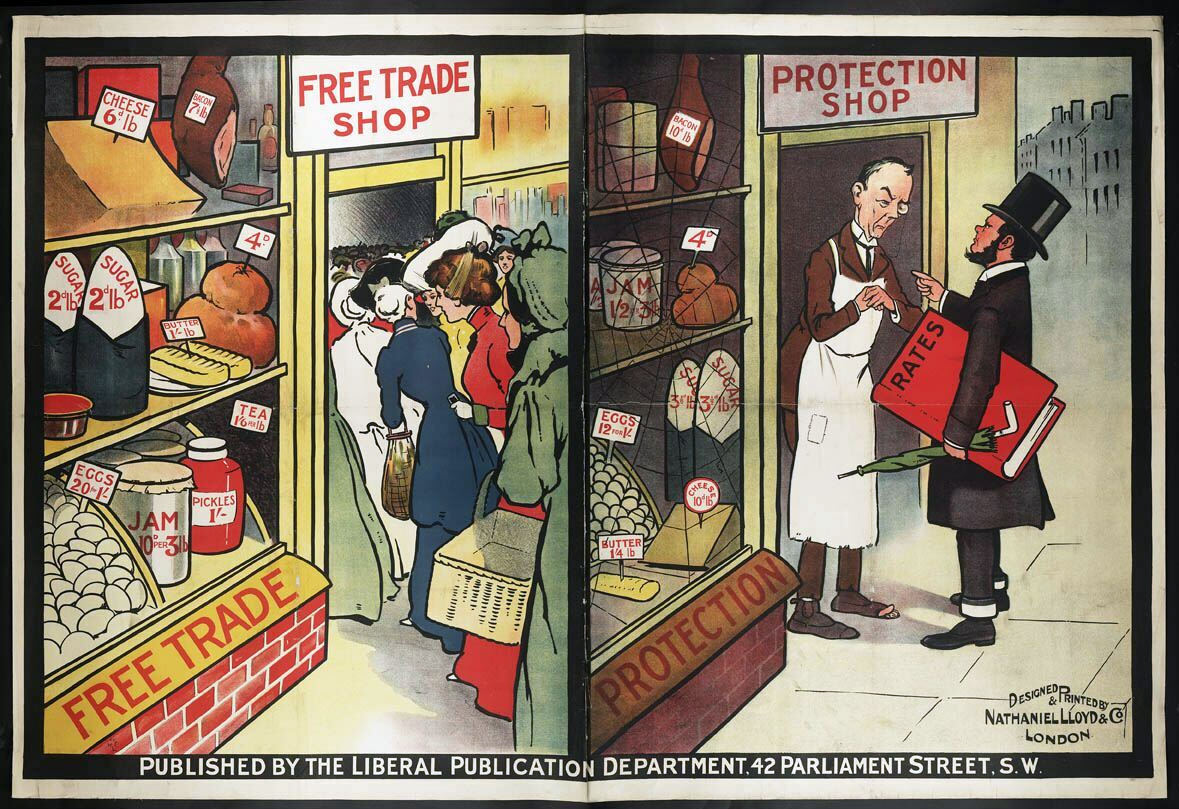
Political poster from the British Liberal Party displaying their views on the differences between an economy based on free trade and protectionism. The free-trade shop is shown as full to the brim with customers due to its low prices. The shop based upon protectionism is shown as suffering from high prices and a lack of customers, with animosity between the business owner and the regulator.

=== Economist opinions ===
Economists have done extensive work on the theoretical and empirical effects of free trade. Although it creates winners and losers, the broad consensus among economists is that free trade provides a net gain for society. In a 2006 survey of American economists (83 responders), "87.5% agree that the U.S. should eliminate remaining tariffs and other barriers to trade" and "90.1% disagree with the suggestion that the U.S. should restrict employers from outsourcing work to foreign countries". Quoting Harvard economics professor N. Gregory Mankiw, "Few propositions command as much consensus among professional economists as that open world trade increases economic growth and raises living standards". In a survey of leading economists, none disagreed with the notion that "freer trade improves productive efficiency and offers consumers better choices, and in the long run these gains are much larger than any effects on employment".

Paul Krugman stated that free trade is greatly beneficial to the world as a whole, and especially beneficial to people in poorer nations, since it allows them to increase their standards of living. He also stated in 2007 that, as the US trades more with less-industrialized countries whose workers are paid less than equivalent US workers (2007 wages in Mexico were 1/10 what they were in the US, and in China less than 1/20), increased trade with those countries will put downward pressure on unskilled labor rates in the US.

=== Public opinion ===
An overwhelming number of people internationally – both in developed and developing countries – support trade with other countries, but are more split when it comes to whether or not they believe trade creates jobs, increases wages, and decreases prices. The median belief in advanced economies is that trade increases wages, with 31 percent of people believing it does, compared to 27 percent who believe it does not. In emerging economies, 47 percent of people believe trade increases wages, compared to 20 percent who says it lowers wages. There is a positive relationship of 0.66 between the average GDP growth rate for the years 2014 to 2017 and the percentage of people in a given country that say trade increases wages. Most people, in both advanced and emerging economies, believe that trade increases prices. 35 percent of people in advanced economies and 56 percent in emerging economies believe trade increases prices, and 29 percent and 18 percent, respectively, believe that trade lowers prices. Those with a higher level of education are more likely than those with less education to believe that trade lowers prices.

Research shows that support for trade restrictions is highest among respondents with the lowest levels of education. Hainmueller and Hiscox find:

that the impact of education on how voters think about trade and globalization has more to do with exposure to economic ideas and information about the aggregate and varied effects of these economic phenomena, than it does with individual calculations about how trade affects personal income or job security. This is not to say that the latter types of calculations are not important in shaping individuals' views of trade – just that they are not being manifest in the simple association between education and support for trade openness

A 2017 study found that individuals whose occupations are routine-task-intensive and who do jobs that are offshorable are more likely to favor protectionism.

Research suggests that attitudes towards free trade do not necessarily reflect individuals' self-interests.

== History ==
=== Early era ===
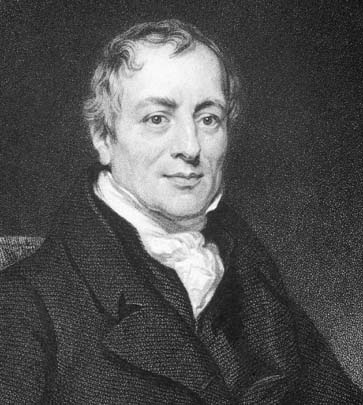
David Ricardo

The notion of a free trade system encompassing multiple sovereign states originated in a rudimentary form in 16th century Imperial Spain. American jurist Arthur Nussbaum noted that Spanish theologian Francisco de Vitoria was "the first to set forth the notions (though not the terms) of freedom of commerce and freedom of the seas". Vitoria made the case under principles of jus gentium. However, it was two early British economists Adam Smith and David Ricardo who later developed the idea of free trade into its modern and recognizable form.

Economists who advocated free trade believed trade was the reason why certain civilizations prospered economically. For example, Smith pointed to increased trading as being the reason for the flourishing of not just Mediterranean cultures such as Egypt, Greece and Rome, but also of Bengal (East India) and China. Netherlands prospered greatly after throwing off Spanish Imperial rule and pursuing a policy of free trade. This made the free trade/mercantilist dispute the most important question in economics for centuries. Free trade policies have battled with mercantilist, protectionist, isolationist, socialist, populist and other policies over the centuries.

=== Ottoman Empire ===
The Ottoman Empire had liberal free trade policies by the 18th century, with origins in capitulations of the Ottoman Empire, dating back to the first commercial treaties signed with France in 1536 and taken further with capitulations in 1673, in 1740 which lowered duties to only 3% for imports and exports and in 1790. Ottoman free trade policies were praised by British economists advocating free trade such as J. R. McCulloch in his Dictionary of Commerce (1834), but criticized by British politicians opposing free trade such as Prime Minister Benjamin Disraeli, who cited the Ottoman Empire as "an instance of the injury done by unrestrained competition" in the 1846 Corn Laws debate, arguing that it destroyed what had been "some of the finest manufactures of the world" in 1812.

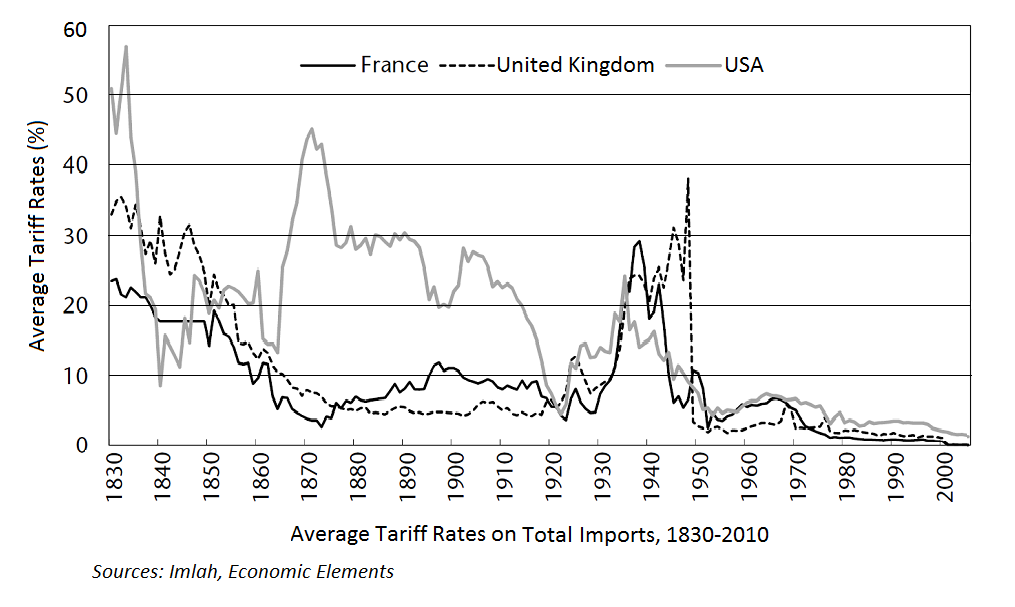
Average tariff rates in France, the United Kingdom and the United States

==== 1846 repeal of corn laws in United Kingdom ====
The Corn Laws were tariffs enforced between 1815 and 1846 on grains (called "corn" and including maize, wheat, oats and barley) imported into the United Kingdom. They raised food prices for everyone and benefited wealthy landholders by limiting corn imports when prices were low. The Corn Laws enhanced the profits and political power associated with land ownership. The laws raised the cost of living for the British public and diverted money away from industry.

The laws became the focus of intense opposition from urban groups who had far less political power than rural landowners.The first two years of the Great Famine in Ireland of 1845–1852 forced a resolution because of the urgent need for new food supplies. Prime Minister Sir Robert Peel played the decisive role. After the defeat of the Tory Party in 1830, he rebuilt the party, renamed it the Conservative Party, and led it to victory in 1841. He now favored Parliament repealing the Corn Laws, and used a third of the Conservative MPs and all of the Whigs to pass the legislation in 1846. Soon, on the Irish issue, the Conservatives lost the 1847 election; Peel never held high office again.

The repeal was a decisive shift towards free trade in Britain over the next half-century. The repeal benefited the bottom 90% of income earners economically, while causing income losses for the top 10%.

=== Trade issues in British politics ===
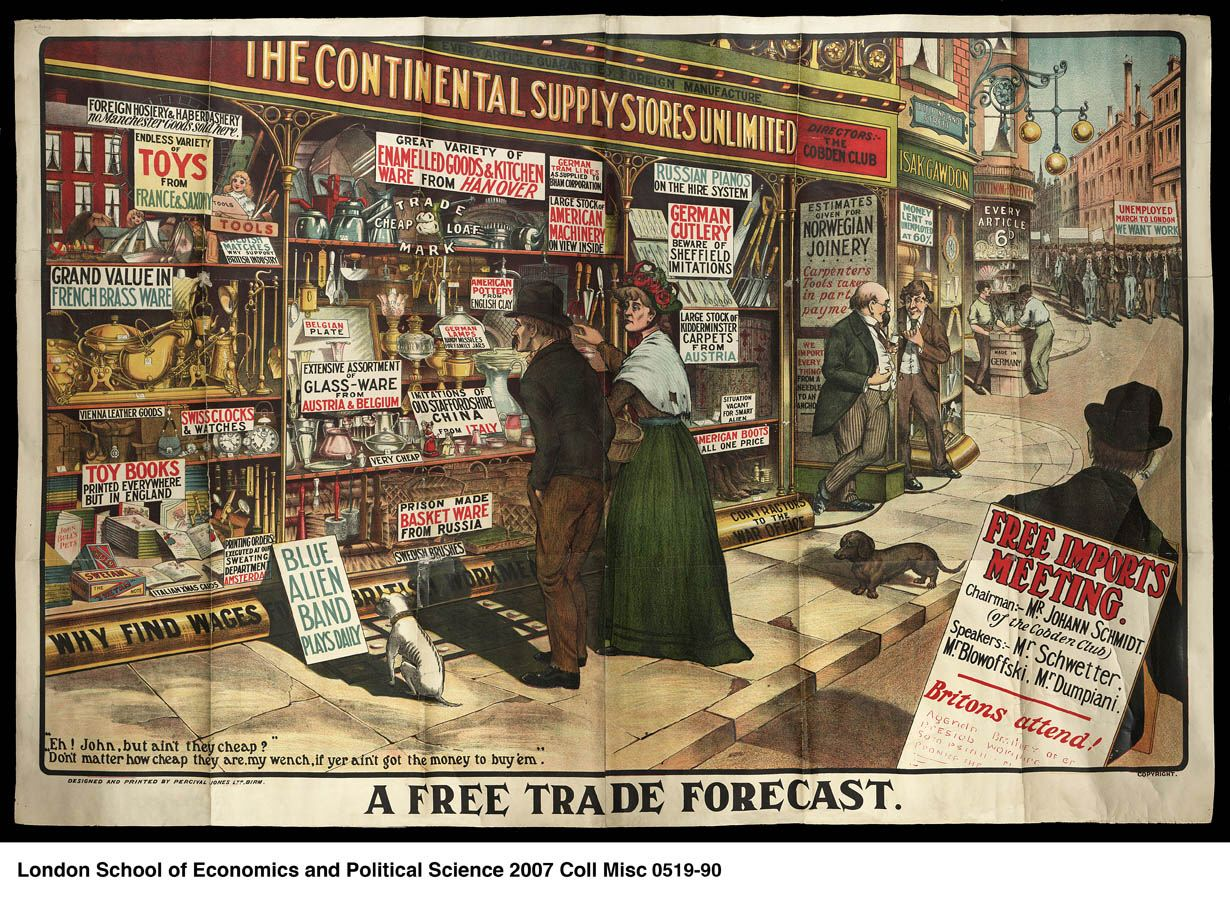
A Free Trade Forecast (ca. 1905–1910), lithograph published by the Imperial Tariff Committee.

From the 1840s to the 1930s, free trade functioned as a primary ideological cleavage in British politics. Positioning on trade policy served not only as an economic preference but as a fundamental marker of partisan identity. The Liberal Party’s trajectory was historically contingent upon its commitment to trade liberalization. The 1846 repeal of the Corn Laws precipitated a schism within the new Conservative Party, eventually facilitating the migration of "Peelite" free-traders, led by William Ewart Gladstone, into the Liberal fold.

In the 1906 General Election, the Liberal Party’s landslide victory was partly a reaction against proposals for higher tariffs outside the British Empire, illustrating the enduring electoral potency of free-trade rhetoric. In 1923 Conservative efforts to reintroduce protective tariffs acted as a catalyst for political realignment at a time when the Labour Party was gaining strength and Liberal Party was trying to pull itself together after the bitter division between factions led by H. H. Asquith versis David Lloyd George. The high-tariff Conservative Party was in power in the 1930s. The Labour Party under Clement Attlee took control in 1945, and instead of free trade it closely controlled and manipulated trade to protect the emerging welfare state and strengthen ties inside the Commonwealth.

In Europe the first free trade agreement, the Cobden-Chevalier Treaty, was put in place in 1860 between Britain and France which led to successive agreements between other countries in Europe.

=== Colonial America and United States ===
Trade in colonial America was regulated by the British mercantile system through the Acts of Trade and Navigation. Until the 1760s, few colonists openly advocated for free trade, in part because regulations were not strictly enforced (New England was famous for smuggling), but also because colonial merchants did not want to compete with foreign goods and shipping. According to historian Oliver Dickerson, a desire for free trade was not one of the causes of the American Revolution. "The idea that the basic mercantile practices of the eighteenth century were wrong", wrote Dickerson, "was not a part of the thinking of the Revolutionary leaders".

Free trade came to the United States as a result of the American Revolution. After the British Parliament issued the Prohibitory Act in 1775, blockading colonial ports, the Continental Congress responded by effectively declaring economic independence, opening American ports to foreign trade on 6 April 1776 – three months before declaring sovereign independence.

Many classical liberals, especially in 19th and early 20th century Britain (e.g. John Stuart Mill) and in the United States for much of the 20th century (e.g. Henry Ford and Secretary of State Cordell Hull), believed that free trade promoted peace. Woodrow Wilson included free-trade rhetoric in his "Fourteen Points" speech of 1918 when he called for : "The removal, so far as possible, of all economic barriers and the establishment of equality of trade conditions among all the nations...."

According to economic historian Douglas Irwin, a common myth about United States trade policy is that low tariffs harmed American manufacturers in the early 19th century and then that high tariffs made the United States into a great industrial power in the late 19th century. A review by the Economist of Irwin's 2017 book Clashing over Commerce: A History of US Trade Policy notes:

Political dynamics would lead people to see a link between tariffs and the economic cycle that was not there. A boom would generate enough revenue for tariffs to fall, and when the bust came pressure would build to raise them again. By the time that happened, the economy would be recovering, giving the impression that tariff cuts caused the crash and the reverse generated the recovery. Mr Irwin also methodically debunks the idea that protectionism made America a great industrial power. . . . As its share of global manufacturing powered from 23% in 1870 to 36% in 1913, the admittedly high tariffs of the time came with a cost, estimated at around 0.5% of GDP in the mid-1870s. In some industries, they might have sped up development by a few years. But American growth during its protectionist period was more to do with its abundant resources and openness to people and ideas.

According to Paul Bairoch, since the end of the 18th century, the United States has been "the homeland and bastion of modern protectionism". In fact, the United States never adhered to free trade until 1945. For the most part, the Jeffersonians strongly opposed protectionism. In the 19th century, statesmen such as Senator Henry Clay continued Alexander Hamilton's themes within the Whig Party under the name "American System." The opposition Democratic Party contested several elections throughout the 1830s, 1840s and 1850s in part opposing the tariff and protection of industry. The Democrats favored moderate tariffs used for government revenue only while the Whigs favored higher protective tariffs to protect favored industries. The economist Henry Charles Carey became a leading proponent of the American System of economics. This mercantilist American System was opposed by the Democratic Party of Andrew Jackson, Martin Van Buren, John Tyler, James K. Polk, Franklin Pierce and James Buchanan.

After 1856 the new Republican Party led by Abraham Lincoln, who called himself a "Henry Clay tariff Whig", strongly opposed free trade. It implemented a 44% tariff during the Civil War, to pay the war effort. Republican Congressman William McKinley introduced tariffs in 1890 which raised the average duty on imports to almost 50%, an increase designed to protect domestic industries and workers from foreign competition, as promised in the Republican platform. It represented protectionism, a policy supported by Republicans and denounced by Democrats. It was a major topic of fierce debate in the 1890 congressional elections, which gave a Democratic landslide. Democrats replaced the McKinley Tariff with the Wilson–Gorman Tariff Act in 1894, which lowered tariff rates. The economy was in a severe depression from 1893 to 1896. In 1896 McKinley was elected president by promising high tariffs would end the depression . He obtained high tariffs from Congress and claimed credit in his 1900 reelection for restoring prosperity.

During the interwar period 1919-1940, economic protectionism took hold in the United States, especially in the Smoot–Hawley Tariff Act of 1930, whose high tariff rates are blamed by economists with the prolonging and worldwide propagation of the Great Depression. Under the Democratic Party's New Deal, trade liberalization took take place through the Reciprocal Trade Agreements Act of 1934.

=== Post–World War II ===
Since the late 1940s, in part due to industrial size and the onset of the Cold War, the United States has often been a proponent of reduced tariff-barriers and free trade. It helped establish the General Agreement on Tariffs and Trade and later the World Trade Organization, although it had rejected an earlier version in the 1950s, the International Trade Organization. Since the 1970s, United States governments have negotiated managed-trade agreements, such as the North American Free Trade Agreement in the 1990s, and the Dominican Republic–Central America Free Trade Agreement in 2006.

In Europe, six countries formed the European Coal and Steel Community in 1951 which became the European Economic Community (EEC) in 1958. Two core objectives of the EEC were the development of a common market, subsequently renamed the single market, and establishing a customs union between its member states. After expanding its membership, the EEC became the European Union in 1993. The European Union, now the world's largest single market, has concluded free trade agreements with many countries around the world.

=== Modern era ===
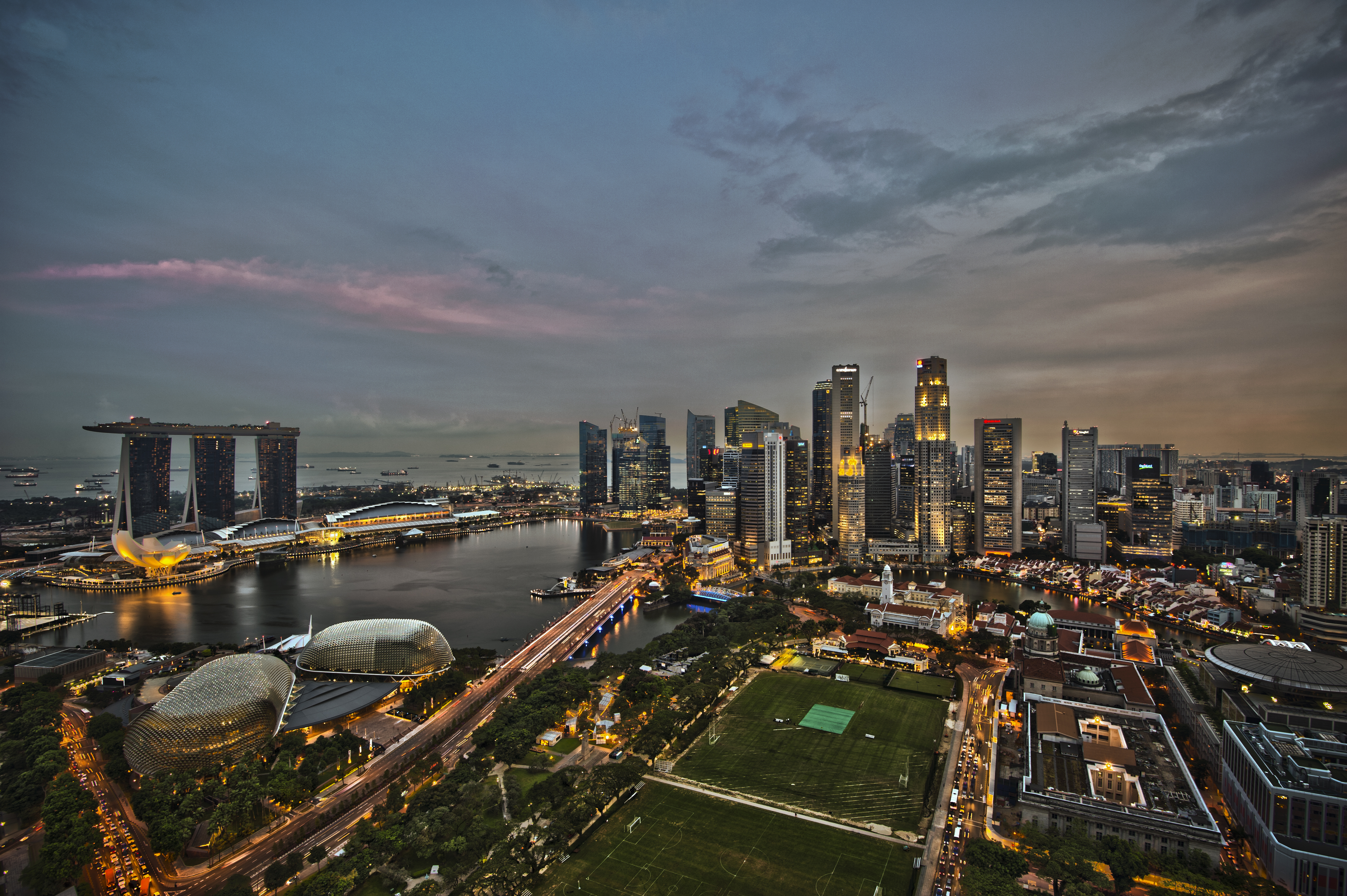
Singapore is the top country in the Enabling Trade Index.

Most countries in the world are members of the World Trade Organization which limits in certain ways but does not eliminate tariffs and other trade barriers. Most countries are also members of regional free trade areas that lower trade barriers among participating countries. The European Union and the United States are negotiating a Transatlantic Trade and Investment Partnership. in 2018, the Comprehensive and Progressive Agreement for Trans-Pacific Partnership came into force, which includes eleven countries that have borders on the Pacific Ocean.

In the 21st century, trade and tariffs have returned to the forefront of political discourse. This resurgence is primarily attributed to the structural shifts initiated by Brexit and the protectionist turn in American foreign policy under the Second Trump administration.

==== Free trade in goods ====
The Global Enabling Trade Report measures the factors, policies and services that facilitate the trade in goods across borders and to destinations. The index summarizes four sub-indexes, namely market access; border administration; transport and communications infrastructure; and business environment. As of 2016, the top 30 countries and areas were the following:

1. Singapore 6.0
2. Netherlands 5.7
3. Hong Kong 5.7
4. Luxembourg 5.6
5. Sweden 5.6
6. Finland 5.6
7. Austria 5.5
8. United Kingdom 5.5
9. Germany 5.5
10. Belgium 5.5
11. Switzerland 5.4
12. Denmark 5.4
13. France 5.4
14. Estonia 5.3
15. Spain 5.3
16. Japan 5.3
17. Norway 5.3
18. New Zealand 5.3
19. Iceland 5.3
20. Ireland 5.3
21. Chile 5.3
22. United States 5.2
23. United Arab Emirates 5.2
24. Canada 5.2
25. Czech Republic 5.1
26. Australia 5.1
27. South Korea 5.0
28. Portugal 5.0
29. Lithuania 5.0
30. Israel 5.0

== Politics ==
Academics, governments, and interest groups debate the relative costs, benefits and beneficiaries of free trade.

Domestic industries often oppose free trade on the grounds that lower prices for imported goods would reduce their profits and market share. For example, if the United States reduced tariffs on imported sugar, sugar producers would receive lower prices and profits, and sugar consumers would spend less for the same amount of sugar because of those same lower prices. The economic theory of David Ricardo holds that consumers would necessarily gain more than producers would lose. Since each of the domestic sugar producers would lose a lot while each of a great number of consumers would gain only a little, domestic producers are more likely to mobilize against the reduction in tariffs. More generally, producers often favor domestic subsidies and tariffs on imports in their home countries while objecting to subsidies and tariffs in their export markets.

The American economist C. Fred Bergsten devised the bicycle theory to describe trade policy. According to this model, trade policy is dynamically unstable in that it constantly tends towards either liberalization or protectionism. To prevent falling off the bike (the disadvantages of protectionism), trade policy and multilateral trade negotiations must constantly pedal towards greater liberalization. To achieve greater liberalization, decision makers must appeal to the greater welfare for consumers and the wider national economy over narrower parochial interests. However, Bergsten also posits that it is also necessary to compensate the losers in trade and help them find new work as this will both reduce the backlash against globalization and the motives for trades unions and politicians to call for protection of trade.

Socialists frequently oppose free trade on the ground that it allows maximum exploitation of workers by capital. For example, Karl Marx wrote in The Communist Manifesto (1848): "The bourgeoisie [...] has set up that single, unconscionable freedom – free trade. In one word, for exploitation, veiled by religious and political illusions, it has substituted naked, shameless, direct, brutal exploitation". Marx supported free trade, however, solely because he felt that it would hasten the social revolution. He also viewed the tendency to support protectionism out of spite for free trade to be unsound. That is because Marx viewed protectionism as a means for domestic firms to establish "large-scale" industry within its borders, which would inevitably make it dependent on the world market so that it could make more revenue for example. He also argues that protectionism does not stop a country from developing a domestic economic system that ironically mirrors competitive free trade.

=== Colonialism ===
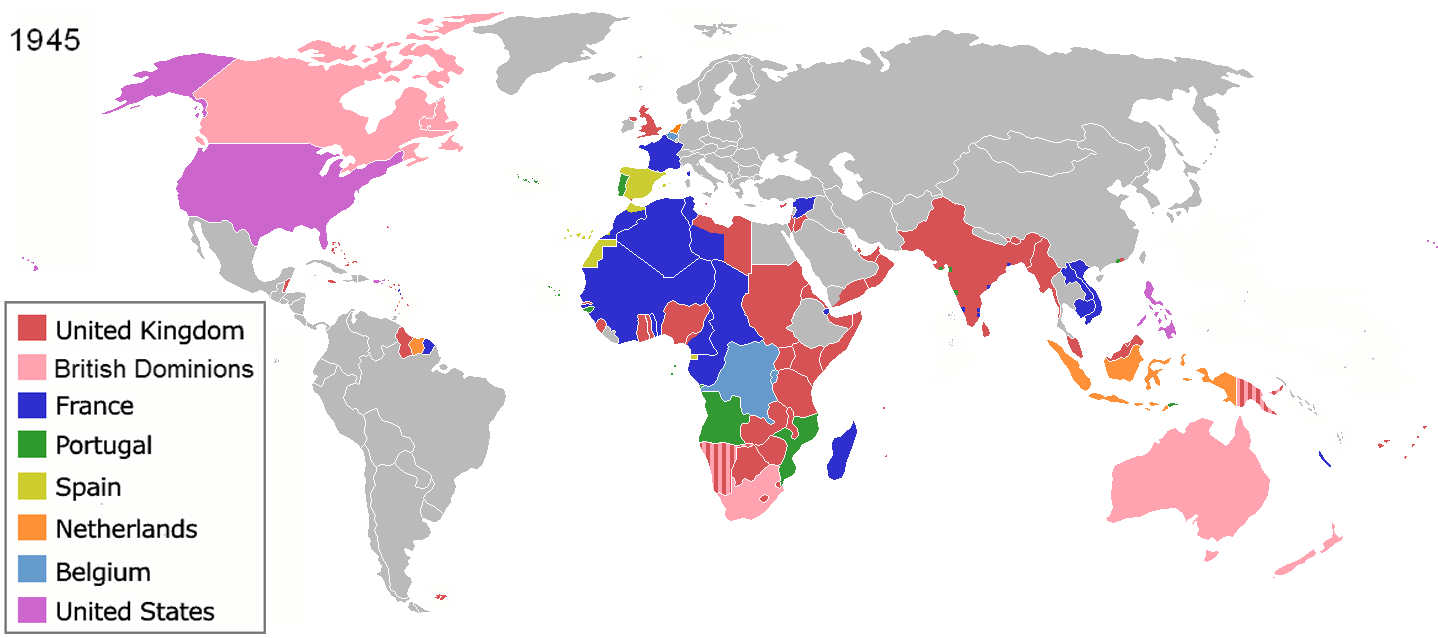
Map of colonial empires in 1945

Various proponents of economic nationalism and of the school of mercantilism have long portrayed free trade as a form of colonialism or imperialism. In the 19th century, such groups criticized British calls for free trade as cover for British Empire, notably in the works of American Henry Clay, architect of the American System.

Free-trade debates and associated matters involving the colonial administration of Ireland have periodically (such as in 1846 and 1906) caused ructions in the British Conservative (Tory) Party (Corn Law issues in the 1820s to the 1840s, Irish Home Rule issues throughout the 19th and early-20th centuries).

== Major free trade areas ==
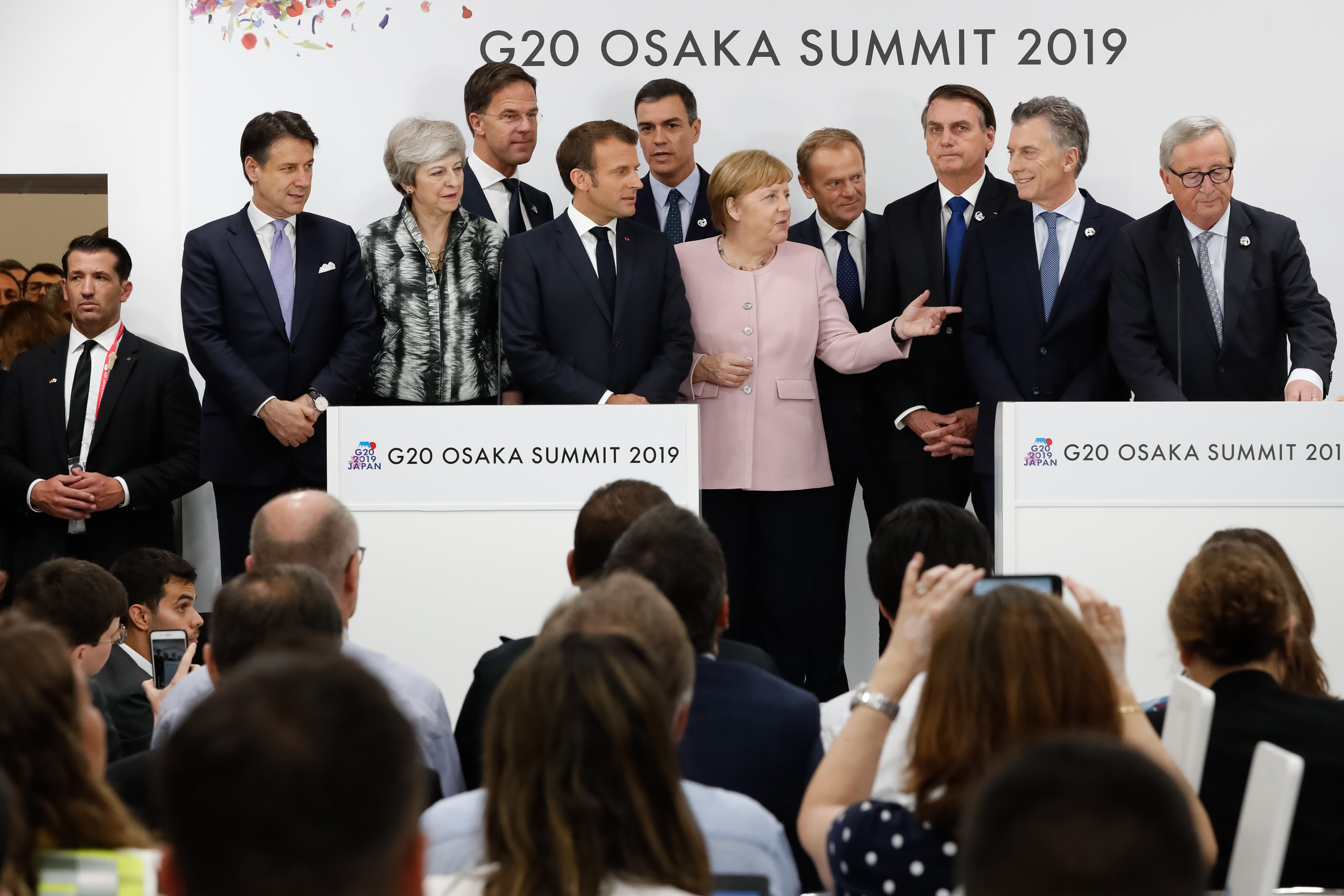
The European Union–Mercosur Free Trade Agreement would form one of the world's largest free trade areas.

=== Americas ===
==== European Union–South America ====
After years of negotiation, the EU–Mercosur Association Agreement moved forward in January 2026. The European Union, overcoming deep internal dissension among its farmers, agreed with Brazil, Argentina, Paraguay and Uruguay to create one of the largest free-trade zones in the world. It would promote free trade among more than 700 million people. It came against the Trump Administration promotion of high tariffs, and American control of Venezuela's economy. EU 's majority decision came despite opposition from France, Poland, Austria, Ireland and Hungary. The agreement will be signed in january 2026, and then must be approved by the European Parliament. According to the Wall Street Journal, "the deal aims to blunt the impact of U.S. tariffs and curb Europe’s economic dependence on China."

== Alternatives ==
The following alternatives to free trade have been proposed: protectionism, imperialism, balanced trade, fair trade, and industrial policy.

Under balanced trade, nations are required to provide a fairly even reciprocal trade pattern; they cannot run large trade deficits or trade surpluses. Fair trade involves allowing trade but taking into account other interests, such as dirigisme, protecting labor rights, environmentalism, etc.

=== Protectionism ===
Protectionism involves tariffs to protect domestic goods and industry from international competition, and to raise government revenue in lieu of other forms of taxation.

In 1846, the United Kingdom abolished the Corn Laws (which had restricted import of grain), in response to the famine in Ireland and other domestic pressures over food prices. It also reduced protectionism for manufactures, but only in the mid 19th century when its technological advantage was at its height. Tariffs on manufactured products had returned to 23% by 1950.

The United States maintained weighted average tariffs on manufactured products of approximately 40–50% up until the 1950s, augmented by the natural protectionism of high transportation costs in the 19th century. The 2016 presidential election marked the beginning of the trend of returning to protectionism in the United States, an ideology incorporated into Republican president Donald Trump's platform and largely maintained by his successor Joe Biden.

=== Imperialism ===
Imperialism entails unequal exchange for the benefit of the mother country, often at the expense of the colonies. The imperial trade practices of the British and Spanish Empires were contributing factors to the American Revolution and the Spanish American Wars of Independence.

Belgium also engaged in unequal exchange, most notoriously in the Congo Free State (CFS) under King Leopold II. In direct violation of his promises of free trade within the CFS under the terms of the Berlin Treaty, not only did the CFS become a commercial entity directly or indirectly trading within its dominion, but Leopold had also been slowly monopolizing a considerable amount of the ivory and rubber trade by imposing export duties on the resources traded by other merchants within the CFS.

== In literature ==
The value of free trade was first observed and documented in 1776 by Adam Smith in The Wealth of Nations, writing:

It is the maxim of every prudent master of a family, never to attempt to make at home what it will cost him more to make than to buy. [...] If a foreign country can supply us with a commodity cheaper than we ourselves can make it, better buy it of them with some part of the produce of our own industry, employed in a way in which we have some advantage.

This statement uses the concept of absolute advantage to present an argument in opposition to mercantilism, the dominant view surrounding trade at the time which held that a country should aim to export more than it imports and thus amass wealth. Instead, Smith argues, countries could gain from each producing exclusively the goods in which they are most suited to, trading between each other as required for the purposes of consumption. In this vein, it is not the value of exports relative to that of imports that is important, but the value of the goods produced by a nation. However, the concept of absolute advantage does not address a situation where a country has no advantage in the production of a particular good or type of good.

This theoretical shortcoming was addressed by the theory of comparative advantage. Generally attributed to David Ricardo, who expanded on it in his 1817 book On the Principles of Political Economy and Taxation, it makes a case for free trade based not on absolute advantage in production of a good, but on the relative opportunity costs of production. A country should specialize in whatever good it can produce at the lowest cost, trading this good to buy other goods it requires for consumption. This allows for countries to benefit from trade even when they do not have an absolute advantage in any area of production. While their gains from trade might not be equal to those of a country more productive in all goods, they will still be better off economically from trade than they would be under a state of autarky.

Exceptionally, Henry George's 1886 book Protection or Free Trade was read out loud in full into the Congressional Record by five Democratic congressmen. American economist Tyler Cowen wrote that Protection or Free Trade "remains perhaps the best-argued tract on free trade to this day". Although George is very critical towards protectionism, he discusses the subject in particular with respect to the interests of labor:

We all hear with interest and pleasure of improvements in transportation by water or land; we are all disposed to regard the opening of canals, the building of railways, the deepening of harbors, the improvement of steamships as beneficial. But if such things are beneficial, how can tariffs be beneficial? The effect of such things is to lessen the cost of transporting commodities; the effect of tariffs is to increase it. If the protective theory be true, every improvement that cheapens the carriage of goods between country and country is an injury to mankind unless tariffs be commensurately increased.

George considers the general free trade argument inadequate. He argues that the removal of protective tariffs alone is never sufficient to improve the situation of the working class, unless accompanied by a shift towards a "single tax" in the form of a land value tax.

== See also ==
Concepts/topics

- Economic globalization – International economic globalization
- Fair trade – Sustainable and equitable trade
- Free market – Form of market-based economy
- Free-trade area – Regional trade agreement
- Free-trade zone – Geographic area where economic activity between and within countries is less regulated
- Non-tariff barriers to trade – Other types of trade barriers
- Offshoring – Transnational relocation of operations
- Trade Adjustment Assistance – US internal economic program
- Trade bloc – Intergovernmental open trading group
- Trade war – Economic conflict using tariffs or other trade barriers

Trade organizations

- General Agreement on Tariffs and Trade, free-trade among Western nations after 1947
- European Economic Area – European free trade zone established in 1994
- Free Trade Area of the Americas – Failed 2005 trade agreement for North and South America
- World Trade Organization – Intergovernmental trade organization

== General and cited references ==
- Bannerman, Gordon (2015). "Free Trade" (pdf). EGO – European History Online. Mainz: Institute of European History. Archived from the original on 2016-02-19.
- Bhagwati, Jagdish (2002). Free Trade Today. Princeton: Princeton University Press. ISBN 0691091560.
- Blinder, Alan S. (2008). "Free Trade". In David R. Henderson (ed.). Concise Encyclopedia of Economics (2nd ed.). Indianapolis: Library of Economics and Liberty. ISBN 978-0865976658. OCLC 237794267.
- Chang, Ha-Joon (2002). Kicking Away the Ladder: Development Strategy in Historical Perspective. Anthem Press. ISBN 978-1-84331-027-3.
- Dickerson, Oliver M. (1963). The Navigation Acts and the American Revolution. New York: Barnes. ISBN 978-0374921620. OCLC 490386016.
- Pugel, Thomas A. (2007). International Economics (13th ed.). New York: McGraw-Hill Irwin. ISBN 978-0073523026.
- Ricardo, David (1999) [1817]. On the Principles of Political Economy and Taxation. Library of Economics and Liberty.
- Smith, Adam (2009). An Inquiry into the Nature and Causes of the Wealth of Nations. Digireads Publishing. ISBN 978-1420932065.
- Tyler, John W. (1986). Smugglers & Patriots: Boston Merchants and the Advent of the American Revolution. Boston: Northeastern University Press. ISBN 9780930350765.
