= Selective Draft Law Cases =

Arver v. United States Grahl v. United States Wangerin v. United States Wangerin v. United States Kramer v. United States Graubard v. United States
- Supreme Court of the United States

Argued December 13–14, 1917 Decided January 7, 1918
- Full case name: Arver v. United States, 245 U.S. 366; Grahl v. United States; Wangerin v. United States; Wangerin v. United States; Goldman v. United States, 245 U.S. 474; Kramer v. United States, 245 U.S. 478; Ruthenburg v. United States, 245 U.S. 480; Graubard v. United States
- Citations: 245 U.S. 366 (more)

Court membership
- Chief Justice Edward D. White Associate Justices Joseph McKenna · Oliver W. Holmes Jr. William R. Day · Willis Van Devanter; Mahlon Pitney · James C. McReynolds; Louis Brandeis · John H. Clarke

Case opinion
- Majority: White, joined by unanimous

Laws applied
- Selective Service Act of 1917

Arver v. United States, 245 U.S. 366 (1918), also known as the Selective Draft Law Cases, was a series of United States Supreme Court decisions united under the Arver name which upheld the Selective Service Act of 1917, and more generally upheld conscription in the United States. The Supreme Court held that conscription did not violate the Thirteenth Amendment's prohibition of involuntary servitude or the First Amendment's protection of freedom of conscience.

The Solicitor General's argument and the court's opinion were based primarily on Kneedler v. Lane, which was actually multiple opinions of the Supreme Court of Pennsylvania during the American Civil War that upheld the Enrollment Act, as well as Vattel's The Law of Nations (1758). The Court's reliance on the Kneedler v. Lane decisions has been questioned on multiple occasions.

As reasoning for its decision, laws of the following governments of sovereign states were given as listed in The Statesman's Yearbook for 1917 as enforcing military service:

- Argentina
- Austria-Hungary
- Belgium
- Brazil
- Bulgaria
- Bolivia
- Canada
- Colombia
- Chile
- China
- Denmark
- Ecuador
- El Salvador
- France
- Greece
- Germany
- Guatemala
- Honduras
- Italy
- Japan
- Mexico
- Montenegro
- Netherlands
- Nicaragua
- Norway
- Peru
- Portugal
- Romania
- Russia
- Serbia
- Siam
- Spain
- Switzerland
- Turkey
