= The Law of Nations =

1758 legal treatise on international law

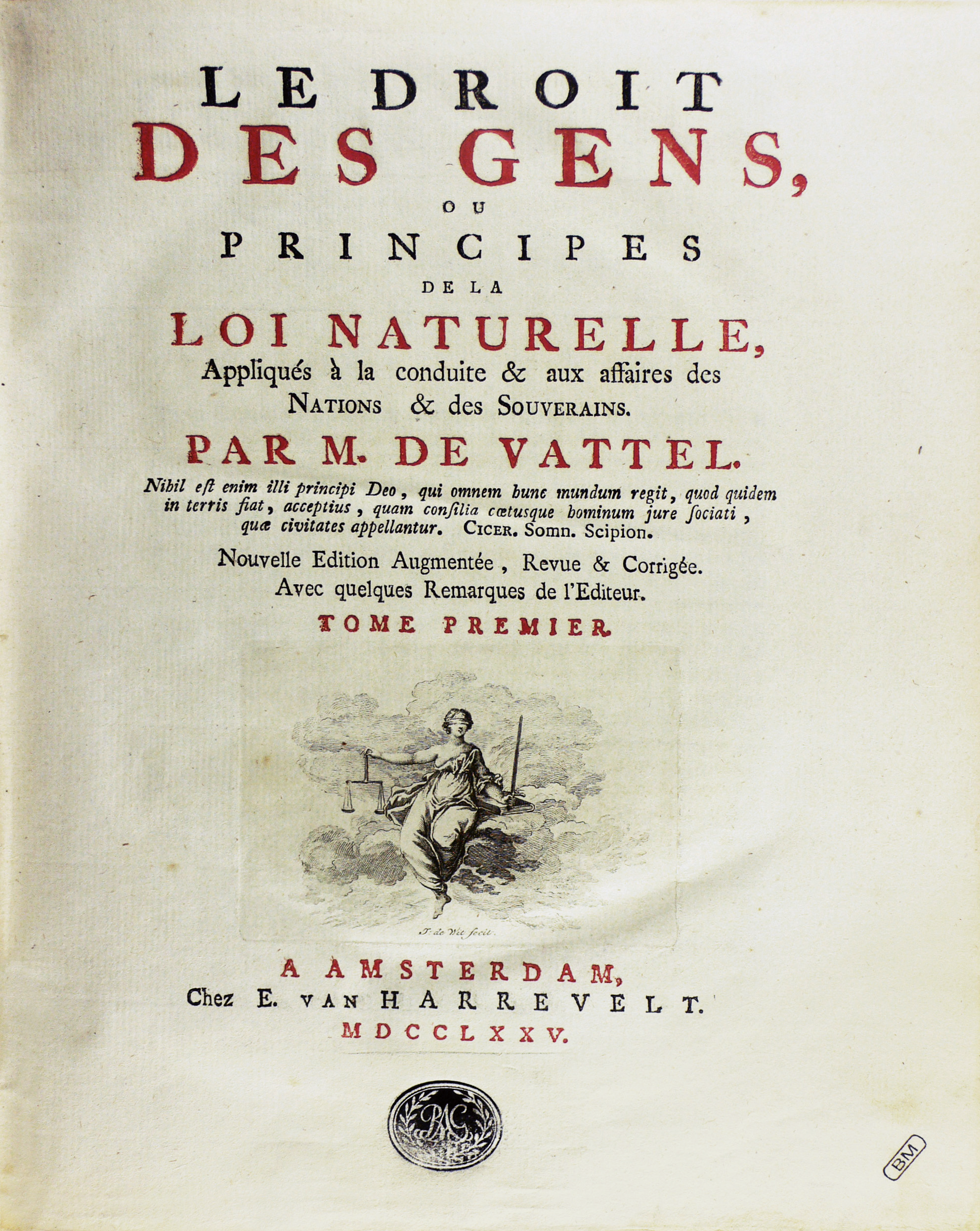
- Cover page
- Author: Emerich de Vattel
- Language: French
- Subject: International Law
- Publication date: 1758
- Publication place: Switzerland
- English publication date: 1760 (1st); 1787 (2nd); 1793 (3rd); 1797 (4th)

The Law of Nations: Or, Principles of the Law of Nature Applied to the Conduct and Affairs of Nations and Sovereigns (Note: French: Le Droit des gens : Principes de la loi naturelle, appliqués à la conduite et aux affaires des Nations et des Souverains) is a legal treatise on international law by Emerich de Vattel, published in 1758.

== Influence ==
Centuries after his death it was found that United States President George Washington had a number of overdue library books at the time of his death. One of them was The Law of Nations.

Swiss editor Charles W. F. Dumas sent Benjamin Franklin three copies of the book in 1775. Franklin received them May 18, June 30, and July 8 by two couriers: Alexandre Pochard (Dumas' friend and later companion to Fleury Mesplet) and a man named Vaillant. Franklin kept one copy for himself, depositing the second in "our own public library here" (the Library Company of Philadelphia which Franklin founded in 1731) and sending the third to the "College of Massachusetts Bay" (Franklin used the original name from 1636, not acknowledging the 1639 rename to Harvard College in honor of John Harvard). In December 1775, Franklin thanked Dumas:

It came to us in good season, when the circumstances of a rising State make it necessary to frequently consult the Law of Nations.

Franklin also said that this book by Vattel, "has been continually in the hands of the members of our Congress now sitting".

It provides at least a partial legal basis for modern conscription in the United States. In the Selective Draft Law Cases (1918), upholding the Selective Service Act of 1917, the court stated:

It may not be doubted that the very conception of a just government and its duty to the citizen includes the reciprocal obligation of the citizen to render military service in case of need, and the right to compel it. Vattel, Law of Nations, book III, cc. 1 and 2. To do more than state the proposition is absolutely unnecessary in view of the practical illustration afforded by the almost universal legislation to that effect now in force.

In the United States, Vattel was one of the treatise writers that influenced James Madison's concept of the freedom of the seas in defense of the principle "free ships make free goods" (in other words, if the ships were neutral, the goods on board were deemed neutral). In the longest work Madison ever wrote, he relied heavily upon Vattel to support his argument that the Rule of 1756 had no legal basis.

According to James Madison, Vattel was "justly charged with failing too much in the merit of a careful discrimination; and sometimes with delivering maxims, which he either could not reconcile, or does not take pains to explain." Regarding the chapter on neutrality (Book III, Chapter VII of The Law of Nations), Madison says Vattel could have been "more exact in his definitions and more lucid in the order of his ideas".

Former Virginia Governor Patrick Henry is said to have read Vattel to prepare his arguments in the 1791 British Debts Case.

== Neutrality ==
The practice of mercantilist economies granting their own ships legal privileges when trading with their colonies, and sometimes restricting trade entirely, created a whole host of issues in the 18th century. Neutral trade or neutral rights became a matter of controversy in the Seven Years' War in which neutral rights were supported by the Kingdom of France and opposed by the Kingdom of Great Britain. Vattel formulated a differing approach to the Rule of 1756 that had emerged from the prize courts in Britain.

With the Rule of 1756 the British had sought to prevent trade by neutral vessels between colonies and mother countries. Practically speaking, this would have stopped American vessels from trading between and the Caribbean and France. Vattel neither fully embraced the British approach distinguishing trade with the enemy (neutral) and trade for the enemy (deemed contraband), nor did he fully subscribe to French the "free ships, free goods" principle. Rather, in the Law of Nations Vattel proposed only some limited restrictions on trade, requiring that states trade with both belligerents to keep their neutral status, but rejected any obligation for neutral states to cease trade. Additionally, neutral nations were encouraged to accept that certain types of goods might be justifiably seized by belligerents, and these seizures should not be construed as acts of war.

== English editions ==
Vattel's Law of Nations was translated into English in 1760, based on the French original of 1758. A Dublin translation does not include notes from the original nor posthumous notes added to the 1773 French edition. Several other English editions were based on the edition of 1760. However, an English edition from 1793 includes Vattel's later thoughts, as did the London 1797 edition. The 1797 edition has a detailed table of contents and margin titles for subsections.
