= Selective Service Act of 1917 =

Former United States conscription law

- Other short titles: Conscription Act of 1917; Enrollment Act of 1917
- Long title: An Act to authorize the President to increase temporarily the military establishment of the United States.
- Nicknames: Selective Draft Act of 1917
- Enacted by: the 65th United States Congress
- Effective: May 18, 1917

Citations
- Public law: Pub. L. 65–12
- Statutes at Large: 40 Stat. 76, Chapter 15

Codification
- Titles amended: 50 U.S.C.: War and National Defense
- U.S.C. sections created: 50 U.S.C. Appendix §§ 201–211, 213, 214

Legislative history
- Introduced in the House as H.R. 3545 by Julius Kahn (R–CA) on April 27, 1917; Passed the House on April 28, 1917 (398–24); Passed the Senate on April 28, 1917 (81–8, in lieu of S. 1871); Reported by the joint conference committee on May 16, 1917; agreed to by the House on May 16, 1917 (198–179) and by the Senate on May 17, 1917 (65–8); Signed into law by President Woodrow Wilson on May 18, 1917

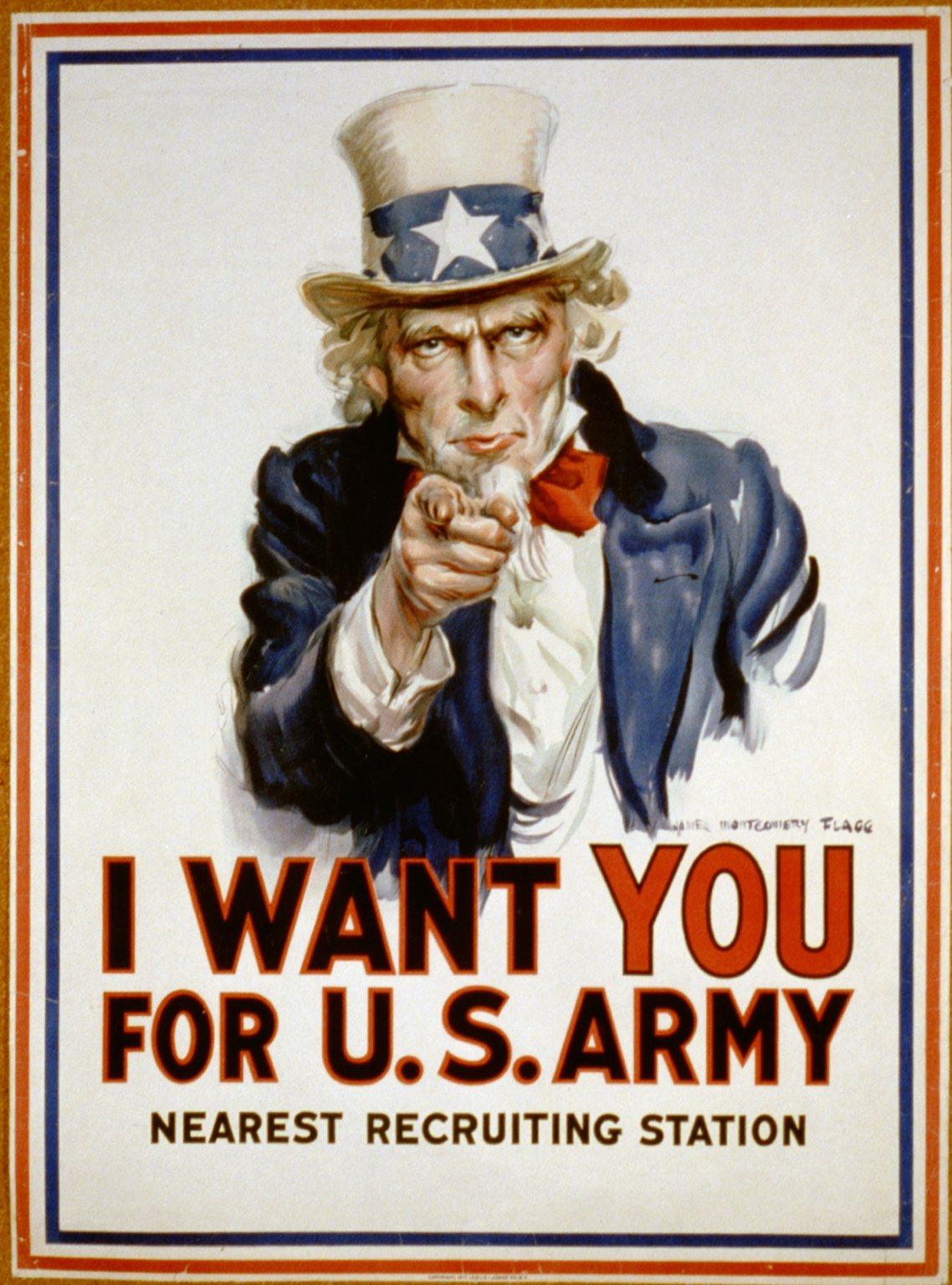
Uncle Sam pointing his finger at the viewer in order to recruit soldiers for the American Army during World War I, 1917–18

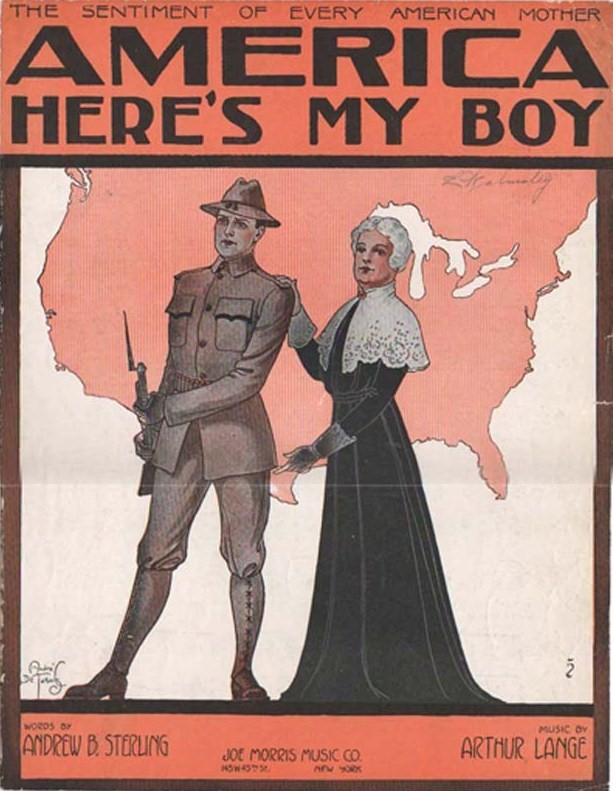
Sheet music cover for patriotic song, 1917

The Selective Service Act of 1917 or Selective Draft Act (Pub. L. 65–12, 40 Stat. 76, enacted May 18, 1917) authorized the United States federal government to raise a national army for service in World War I through conscription. It was envisioned in December 1916 and brought to President Woodrow Wilson's attention shortly after the break in relations with Germany in February 1917. The Act itself was drafted by then-Captain (later Brigadier General) Hugh S. Johnson after the United States entered World War I when it declared war on Germany. The Act was canceled with the end of the war on November 11, 1918. The United States Supreme Court upheld the Act as constitutional in 1918.

== History ==
=== Origins ===
At the time of World War I, the United States Army was small compared with the mobilized armies of the European powers. As late as 1914, the Regular Army had under 100,000 men, while the National Guard (the organized militias of the states) numbered around 115,000. The National Defense Act of 1916 authorized the growth of the Army to 165,000 and the National Guard to 450,000 by 1921, but by 1917 the Army had only expanded to around 121,000, with the National Guard numbering 181,000.

By 1916, it had become clear that any participation by the United States in the conflict in Europe would require a far larger army. While President Wilson at first wished to use only volunteer troops, it soon became clear that this would be impossible. When war was declared, Wilson asked for the Army to increase to a force of one million. An astonishing 73,000 men had volunteered within the first day of the war's declaration, but by six weeks after the call, it was clear that waiting for more self-elected men would not be compatible with the intended plans of quickly mobilizing a fighting force to Europe. Wilson then accepted the recommendation of Secretary of War Newton D. Baker for a draft.

General Enoch H. Crowder, the judge advocate general of the United States Army, when first consulted, was opposed. But later, with the assistance of Captain Hugh Johnson and others, Crowder guided the bill through Congress and administered the draft as the Provost Marshal General.

A problem that came up in the writing of the bill and its negotiation through Congress was the desire of former President Theodore Roosevelt to assemble a volunteer force to go to Europe. President Wilson and others, including army officers, were reluctant to permit this for a variety of reasons. The final bill contained a compromise provision permitting the president to raise four volunteer divisions, a power Wilson did not exercise.

To persuade an uninterested populace to support the war and the draft, George Creel, a veteran of the newspaper industry, became the United States' official war propagandist. He set up the Committee on Public Information, which recruited 75,000 speakers, who made 750,000 four-minute speeches in 5,000 cities and towns across America. Creel later helped form the American Alliance for Labor and Democracy, with union leader Samuel Gompers as president, to win working-class support for the war and "unify sentiment in the nation". The AALD had branches in 164 cities, and many labor leaders went along although "rank-and-file working class support for the war remained lukewarm ...", and the campaign was ultimately unsuccessful. Many prominent Socialist leaders became pro-war, though the majority did not.

=== Effects ===
By the guidelines set down by the Selective Service Act, all males aged 21 to 30 were required to register to potentially be selected for military service. At the request of the War Department, Congress amended the law in August 1918 to expand the age range to include all men 18 to 45, and to bar further volunteering. By the end of World War I, some two million men volunteered for various branches of the armed services, and some 2.8 million had been drafted. This meant that more than half of the almost 4.8 million Americans who served in the armed forces were drafted. Due to the effort to incite a patriotic attitude, the World War I draft had a high success rate, with fewer than 350,000 men "dodging" the draft. Section 7 of the Act provided that men would be "as far as practicable...grouped into units by States and the political subdivisions of the same," the most prominent example being the "National Army" infantry divisions.

=== Differences from previous drafts ===
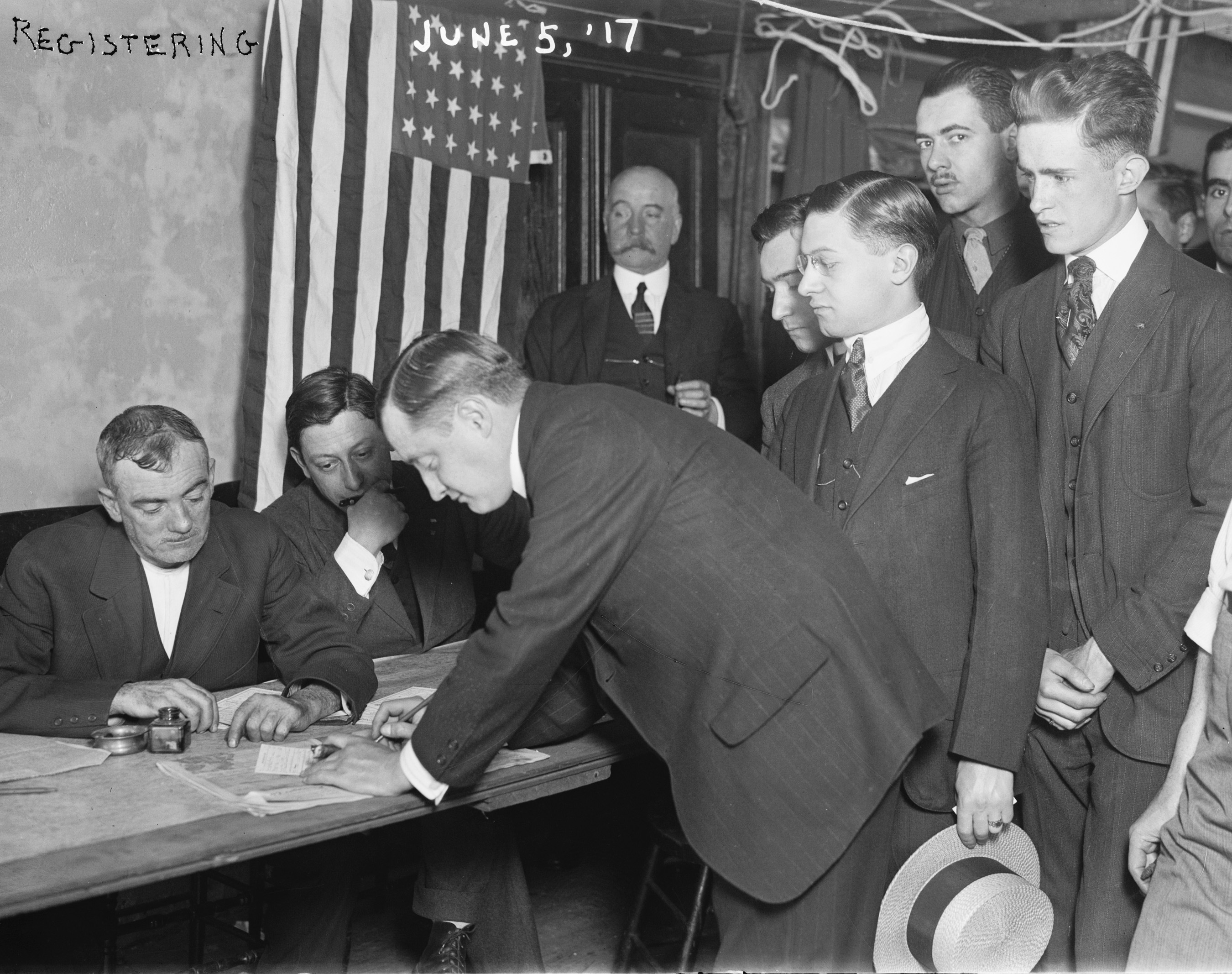
Young men at the first national registration day held in association with the Selective Service Act of 1917.

The most important difference between the draft established by the Selective Service Act of 1917 and the Civil War draft was that substitutes were not allowed. During the Civil War, a drafted man could avoid service by hiring another man to serve in his place. A mostly inaccurate perception spread that substitutes were used primarily by wealthy men and was resented by those who could not afford them or considered them dishonorable.

The practice of substitutes was prohibited in Section Three of the Selective Service Act of 1917:

No person liable to military service shall hereafter be permitted or allowed to furnish a substitute for such service; nor shall any substitute be received, enlisted, or enrolled in the military service of the United States; and no such person shall be permitted to escape such service or to be discharged therefrom prior to the expiration of his term of service by the payment of money or any other valuable thing whatsoever as consideration his release from military service or liability there to.

=== National registration days and termination ===
During World War I, there were three registrations.

- The first, on June 5, 1917, was for all men between the ages of 21 and 30.
- The second, on June 5, 1918, registered those who attained age 21 after June 5, 1917. A supplemental registration, included in the second registration, was held on August 24, 1918, for those becoming 21 years old after June 5, 1918.
- The third, on September 12, 1918, was for men age 18 through 45.

The Selective Service Act was upheld by the United States Supreme Court in the Selective Draft Law Cases, 245 U.S. 366 (1918). The Solicitor General's argument and the court's opinion were based primarily on Kneedler v. Lane, 45 Pa. 238, 252 (1863) and Vattel's 1758 treatise The Law of Nations.

After the signing of the armistice of November 11, 1918, the activities of the Selective Service System were rapidly curtailed. On March 31, 1919, all local, district, and medical advisory boards were closed, and on May 21, 1919, the last state headquarters closed operations. The Provost Marshal General was relieved from duty on July 15, 1919, thereby finally terminating the activities of the Selective Service System of World War I.

== Draft categories ==
Conscription was by class. The first candidates were to be drawn from Class I. Members of each class below Class I were available only if the pool of all available and potential candidates in the class above it were exhausted.

	Class	Categories (May 1917 – July 1919)
I.	Eligible and liable for military service.	Unmarried registrants with no dependents, Married registrants with independent spouse or one or more dependent children over 16 with sufficient family income if drafted.
II.	Temporarily deferred, but available for military service.	Married registrants with dependent spouse or dependent children under 16 with sufficient family income if drafted.
III.	Temporarily exempted, but available for military service.	Local officials. Registrants who provide sole family income for dependent parents or dependent siblings under 16. Registrants employed in agricultural labor or industrial enterprises essential to the war effort.
IV.	Exempted due to extreme hardship.	Married registrants with dependent spouse or dependent children with insufficient family income if drafted. Registrants with deceased spouse who provide sole family income for dependent children under 16. Registrants with deceased parents who provide sole family income for dependent siblings under 16.
V.	Exempted or ineligible for induction into military service.	State or Federal officials. Officers and enlisted men in the military or naval service of the United States, Licensed pilots employed in the pursuit of their vocation. Members of the clergy. Students who on or before May 18, 1917 had been preparing for the ministry in a recognized theological or divinity school. Registrants who were deemed either medically disabled (permanently physically or mentally unfit) or "morally unfit" for military service. Registrants shown to have been convicted of any crime designated as treason or felony, or an "infamous" crime. Enemy aliens and resident aliens.

== African-Americans ==
The American military was entirely segregated at the time of World War I. While the Army had several regiments of black "Buffalo Soldiers", many politicians such as Sen. James K. Vardaman (Mississippi) and Sen. Benjamin Tillman (South Carolina) staunchly opposed any expanded military role for black Americans. Nevertheless, the War Department decided to include black people in the draft. A total of 2,290,527 black Americans were ultimately registered for the draft during the two calls of June 2 and September 12, 1917 – 9.6 percent of the total American pool for potential conscription.

Draft board officials were told to tear off the lower left-hand corner of the Selective Service form of a black registrant, indicating his designation for segregated units. The August 1917 Houston Riot, when armed black soldiers fired upon Houston police and civilians, also affected the War Department's decision-making. The great majority of black soldiers were employed only in labor functions, such as road-building and freight-handling. Only two black combat units were ultimately established – the 92nd and 93rd Infantry Divisions. Black Americans were entirely excluded from the United States Marine Corps and were consigned to menial labor in the United States Navy for the duration of the war.

== See also ==
- American Indians in World War I
- Conscription in the United States
- Selective Service System
