= List of countries by trade-to-GDP ratio =

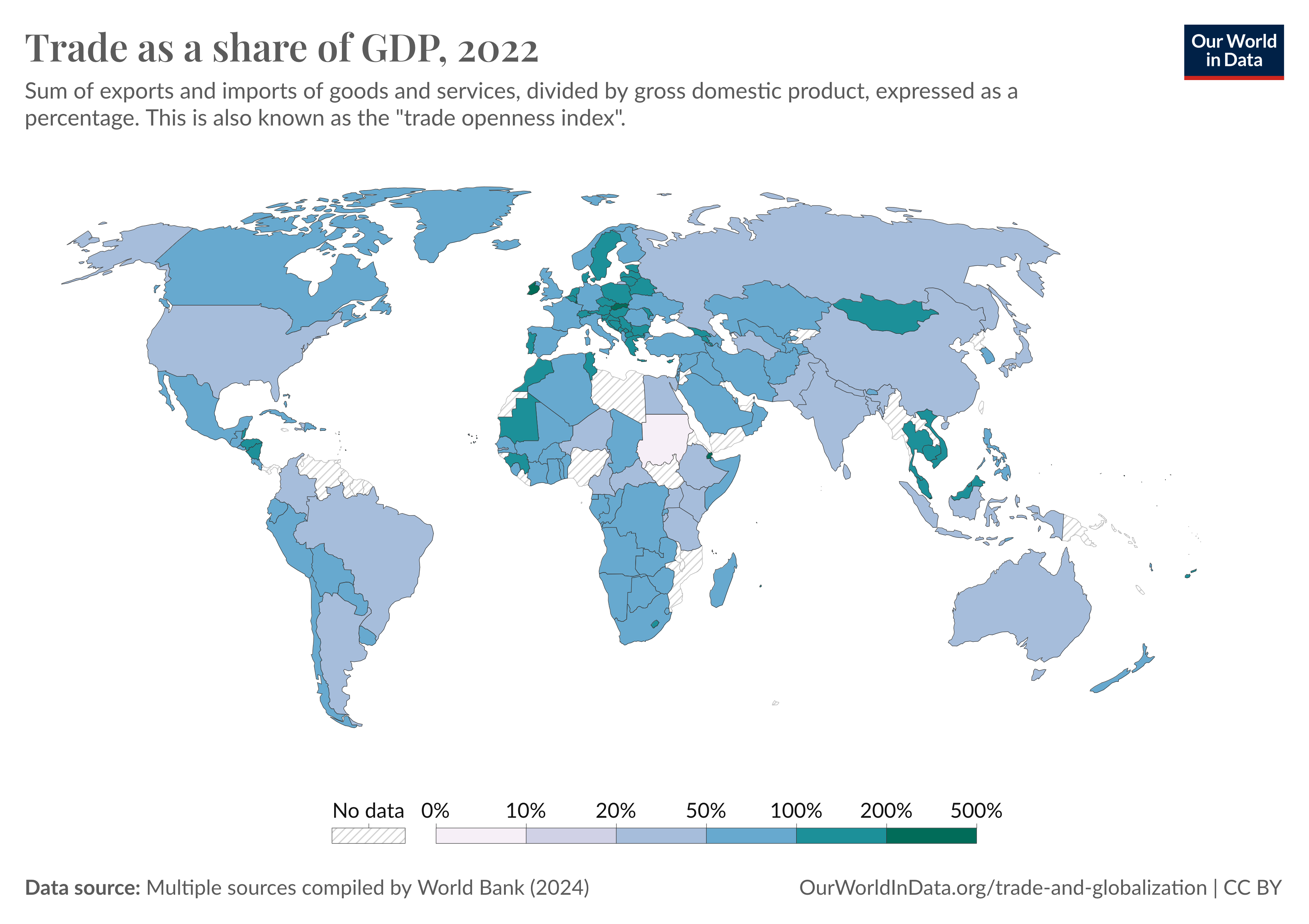
World map by trade as a share of GDP

Trade openness in 2019

This is a list of countries by trade-to-GDP ratio, i.e. the sum of exports and imports of goods and services, divided by gross domestic product, expressed as a percentage, based on the data published by World Bank. The list includes sovereign states and self-governing dependent territories based upon the ISO standard ISO 3166-1.

Imports of goods and services represent the value of all goods and other market services received from the rest of the world. Exports of goods and services represent the value of all goods and other market services provided to the rest of the world. They include the value of merchandise, freight, insurance, transport, travel, royalties, license fees, and other services, such as communication, construction, financial, information, business, personal, and government services. They exclude compensation of employees and investment income (formerly called factor services) and transfer payments. The trade-to-GDP ratio is also known as the "trade openness index".

== Definition ==
The trade-to-GDP ratio is an indicator of the relative importance of international trade in the economy of a country. It is calculated by dividing the aggregate value of imports and exports over a period by the gross domestic product for the same period. Although called a ratio, it is usually expressed as a percentage. It is used as a measure of the openness of a country to international trade and so may also be called the trade openness ratio. It may be seen as an indicator of the degree of globalisation of an economy.

Other factors aside, the trade-to-GDP ratio tends to be low in countries with large economies and large populations such as Japan and the United States and to have a higher value in small economies. Singapore has the highest trade-to-GDP ratio of any country; between 2008 and 2011 it averaged about 400%. For economies such as Armenia the trade to GDP ratio is not as high as for Singapore, but at the same time it is not as low as for the developed countries such as USA and Japan. Taking into account the last available data for Armenia, trade openness is approximately 78% for 2021.

For trade-to-GDP ratio, the provided data for Armenia is from 1990 to 2021. The average value for Armenia during that period was 77.92% with a minimum of 54.54% in 2008 and a maximum of 112.43% in 1994. For comparison, the world average in 2021 based on 129 countries is 90.86%. See the global rankings for that indicator or use the country comparator to compare trends over time. Worldwide trade-to-GDP ratio rose from just over 20% in 1995 to about 30% in 2014.

== List of countries by trade-to-GDP ratio ==
The following table provides information on exports and imports of goods and services, based on the data published by World Bank, trade openness index, calculated as their sum, and the ratio between exports and imports. Since GDP is only the value added domestically, it may happen that small countries export more than is produced in the country and/or import more than is consumed in the country and the external trade rate is thus over 100%.

Sorting is alphabetical by country code, according to ISO 3166-1 alpha-3.

Country/Territory/Region/Group	Exports (% of GDP)	Imports (% of GDP)	Trade Openness Index (% of GDP)	Export/ Import ratio	Year
(United Nations) WORLD	29.27%	28.67%	57.93%	1.02	2023
Aruba	83.12%	77.33%	160.46%	1.07	2022
Afghanistan	18.38%	54.51%	72.89%	0.34	2022
Angola	39.87%	26.66%	66.53%	1.50	2023
Albania	39.62%	44.91%	84.54%	0.88	2023
United Arab Emirates	95.93%	70.65%	166.57%	1.36	2020
Argentina	12.92%	14.05%	26.97%	0.92	2023
Armenia	58.18%	58.86%	117.04%	0.99	2023
American Samoa	46.96%	77.73%	124.68%	0.60	2022
Antigua and Barbuda	54.69%	62.94%	117.63%	0.87	2022
Australia	26.72%	21.36%	48.08%	1.25	2023
Austria	59.48%	56.64%	116.12%	1.05	2023
Azerbaijan	49.05%	34.57%	83.62%	1.42	2023
Burundi	5.26%	24.33%	29.59%	0.22	2023
Belgium	86.68%	87.61%	174.30%	0.99	2023
Benin	21.19%	30.16%	51.35%	0.70	2023
Burkina Faso	28.86%	35.96%	64.82%	0.80	2023
Bangladesh	13.16%	17.83%	30.98%	0.74	2023
Bulgaria	60.88%	57.72%	118.60%	1.05	2023
Bahrain	89.68%	70.19%	159.87%	1.28	2021
Bahamas	39.75%	42.96%	82.70%	0.93	2023
Bosnia and Herzegovina	44.13%	56.90%	101.03%	0.78	2023
Belarus	66.82%	66.18%	133.00%	1.01	2023
Belize	53.62%	52.86%	106.48%	1.01	2023
Bermuda	50.46%	25.05%	75.51%	2.01	2022
Bolivia	27.28%	31.57%	58.85%	0.86	2023
Brazil	18.11%	15.74%	33.85%	1.15	2023
Barbados	34.28%	42.18%	76.46%	0.81	2022
Brunei	76.53%	60.03%	136.56%	1.27	2023
Bhutan	25.79%	60.14%	85.93%	0.43	2022
Botswana	31.66%	35.71%	67.37%	0.89	2023
Central African Republic	14.44%	29.04%	43.48%	0.50	2023
Canada	33.54%	33.93%	67.46%	0.99	2023
Switzerland	75.33%	62.89%	138.22%	1.20	2023
Chile	31.14%	29.83%	60.97%	1.04	2023
China	19.74%	17.57%	37.32%	1.12	2023
Ivory Coast	22.87%	26.61%	49.48%	0.86	2023
Cameroon	18.30%	20.30%	38.60%	0.90	2023
Democratic Republic of the Congo	44.25%	47.02%	91.26%	0.94	2023
Republic of the Congo	56.90%	39.31%	96.21%	1.45	2023
Colombia	17.76%	22.72%	40.48%	0.78	2023
Comoros	12.96%	34.99%	47.94%	0.37	2023
Cape Verde	39.72%	54.14%	93.87%	0.73	2023
Costa Rica	37.29%	33.00%	70.29%	1.13	2023
Cuba	40.01%	48.79%	88.80%	0.82	2022
Curaçao	63.25%	92.02%	155.27%	0.69	2018
Cayman Islands	59.63%	45.84%	105.47%	1.30	2020
Cyprus	89.35%	90.27%	179.62%	0.99	2023
Czech Republic	72.01%	66.91%	138.92%	1.08	2023
Germany	47.14%	42.97%	90.11%	1.10	2023
Djibouti	169.11%	173.60%	342.70%	0.97	2023
Dominica	29.19%	77.77%	106.96%	0.38	2018
Denmark	69.01%	59.44%	128.45%	1.16	2023
Dominican Republic	21.14%	28.48%	49.62%	0.74	2023
Algeria	25.17%	21.03%	46.20%	1.20	2023
Ecuador	29.07%	28.78%	57.85%	1.01	2023
Egypt	19.11%	21.34%	40.45%	0.90	2023
Eritrea	18.15%	29.24%	47.39%	0.62	2011
Spain	38.96%	34.83%	73.79%	1.12	2023
Estonia	78.38%	77.78%	156.16%	1.01	2023
Ethiopia	6.59%	13.99%	20.59%	0.47	2023
Finland	40.96%	41.38%	82.35%	0.99	2023
Fiji	55.16%	65.77%	120.93%	0.84	2023
France	32.68%	34.90%	67.58%	0.94	2023
Faroe Islands	62.40%	62.51%	124.91%	1.00	2022
Federated States of Micronesia	27.35%	67.54%	94.88%	0.40	2023
Gabon	56.70%	17.44%	74.14%	3.25	2023
United Kingdom	32.17%	33.41%	65.59%	0.96	2023
Georgia	49.39%	56.93%	106.31%	0.87	2023
Ghana	34.04%	35.00%	69.04%	0.97	2023
Guinea	39.17%	29.81%	68.97%	1.31	2023
Gambia	5.45%	35.14%	40.59%	0.15	2023
Guinea-Bissau	17.92%	28.26%	46.18%	0.63	2023
Equatorial Guinea	47.81%	39.32%	87.13%	1.22	2023
Greece	44.87%	49.80%	94.66%	0.90	2023
Greenland	35.44%	49.72%	85.15%	0.71	2021
Guatemala	17.19%	32.94%	50.13%	0.52	2023
Guam	7.89%	63.98%	71.87%	0.12	2022
Guyana	84.62%	109.73%	194.35%	0.77	2005
Hong Kong	176.22%	175.38%	351.59%	1.00	2023
Honduras	37.01%	60.94%	97.95%	0.61	2023
Croatia	54.03%	55.90%	109.92%	0.97	2023
Haiti	5.27%	25.51%	30.79%	0.21	2023
Hungary	81.20%	76.09%	157.30%	1.07	2023
Indonesia	21.75%	19.57%	41.32%	1.11	2023
India	21.89%	23.96%	45.85%	0.91	2023
Ireland	134.14%	100.61%	234.75%	1.33	2023
Iran	28.64%	26.91%	55.54%	1.06	2023
Iraq	37.32%	24.18%	61.50%	1.54	2021
Iceland	43.37%	43.42%	86.79%	1.00	2023
Israel	30.86%	27.13%	58.00%	1.14	2023
Italy	35.05%	33.67%	68.73%	1.04	2023
Jamaica	38.04%	52.07%	90.11%	0.73	2019
Jordan	30.31%	50.18%	80.49%	0.60	2021
Japan	21.54%	25.30%	46.84%	0.85	2022
Kazakhstan	41.78%	26.33%	68.11%	1.59	2022
Kenya	11.84%	20.58%	32.42%	0.58	2023
Kyrgyzstan	29.94%	87.45%	117.39%	0.34	2022
Cambodia	73.15%	40.39%	113.54%	1.81	2023
Kiribati	7.40%	92.49%	99.89%	0.08	2023
South Korea	44.00%	43.94%	87.94%	1.00	2023
Kuwait	52.33%	44.08%	96.41%	1.19	2019
Laos	33.21%	41.88%	75.09%	0.79	2016
Lebanon	46.08%	82.45%	128.53%	0.56	2023
Libya	68.63%	41.30%	109.93%	1.66	2023
Sri Lanka	20.39%	21.89%	42.28%	0.93	2023
Lesotho	47.22%	98.52%	145.74%	0.48	2022
Lithuania	78.49%	74.65%	153.15%	1.05	2023
Luxembourg	212.53%	181.69%	394.22%	1.17	2023
Latvia	64.06%	67.91%	131.97%	0.94	2023
Macau	92.68%	49.32%	142.00%	1.88	2023
Morocco	43.95%	52.26%	96.21%	0.84	2023
Moldova	35.54%	59.59%	95.13%	0.60	2023
Madagascar	32.53%	39.06%	71.59%	0.83	2023
Mexico	36.20%	37.92%	74.12%	0.95	2023
Marshall Islands	46.27%	73.67%	119.94%	0.63	2022
North Macedonia	72.79%	86.31%	159.10%	0.84	2023
Mali	28.19%	37.79%	65.98%	0.75	2023
Malta	166.71%	147.29%	314.00%	1.13	2023
Montenegro	50.69%	69.30%	119.99%	0.73	2023
Mongolia	78.01%	69.23%	147.24%	1.13	2023
Northern Mariana Islands	14.92%	62.47%	77.39%	0.24	2020
Mozambique	52.54%	83.02%	135.56%	0.63	2022
Mauritania	44.18%	52.17%	96.35%	0.85	2023
Mauritius	53.25%	55.18%	108.43%	0.97	2023
Malaysia	68.42%	63.43%	131.84%	1.08	2023
Namibia	43.41%	66.20%	109.61%	0.66	2023
New Caledonia	21.01%	37.92%	58.93%	0.55	2017
Niger	8.83%	21.59%	30.42%	0.41	2023
Nigeria	9.24%	16.92%	26.17%	0.55	1960
Nicaragua	45.80%	59.07%	104.87%	0.78	2023
Netherlands	84.96%	73.85%	158.82%	1.15	2023
Norway	47.18%	32.47%	79.65%	1.45	2023
Nepal	6.96%	34.68%	41.64%	0.20	2023
Nauru	54.72%	113.21%	167.92%	0.48	2022
New Zealand	24.39%	29.69%	54.09%	0.82	2022
Oman	52.53%	41.39%	93.92%	1.27	2021
Pakistan	10.39%	17.72%	28.10%	0.59	2023
Panama	47.92%	47.99%	95.91%	1.00	2022
Peru	27.09%	23.82%	50.91%	1.14	2023
Philippines	26.65%	40.74%	67.40%	0.65	2023
Palau	14.20%	78.34%	92.54%	0.18	2022
Papua New Guinea	72.16%	58.92%	131.08%	1.22	2004
Poland	57.81%	51.72%	109.54%	1.12	2023
Puerto Rico	53.93%	47.80%	101.73%	1.13	2023
Portugal	47.44%	46.61%	94.05%	1.02	2023
Paraguay	42.55%	40.44%	82.99%	1.05	2023
Palestine	19.62%	66.89%	86.52%	0.29	2023
French Polynesia	21.10%	46.13%	67.23%	0.46	2022
Qatar	68.58%	31.61%	100.19%	2.17	2022
Romania	39.13%	43.91%	83.04%	0.89	2023
Russia	23.08%	18.75%	41.83%	1.23	2023
Rwanda	25.42%	40.56%	65.98%	0.63	2023
Saudi Arabia	34.75%	27.38%	62.13%	1.27	2023
Sudan	1.16%	1.04%	2.21%	1.11	2023
Senegal	25.56%	43.88%	69.44%	0.58	2023
Singapore	174.30%	136.94%	311.24%	1.27	2023
Solomon Islands	26.29%	51.75%	78.04%	0.51	2022
Sierra Leone	40.47%	67.28%	107.75%	0.60	2023
El Salvador	31.13%	49.80%	80.92%	0.63	2023
San Marino	184.31%	158.16%	342.47%	1.17	2021
Somalia	17.89%	76.69%	94.58%	0.23	2023
Serbia	59.88%	64.39%	124.27%	0.93	2023
South Sudan	36.65%	28.90%	65.55%	1.27	2015
Suriname	52.55%	38.41%	90.96%	1.37	2010
Slovakia	91.43%	90.10%	181.53%	1.01	2023
Slovenia	84.00%	77.33%	161.33%	1.09	2023
Sweden	53.98%	49.58%	103.57%	1.09	2023
Eswatini	43.83%	47.59%	91.42%	0.92	2022
Seychelles	85.95%	97.12%	183.07%	0.88	2023
Syria	24.80%	73.06%	97.85%	0.34	2021
Chad	43.50%	48.07%	91.58%	0.90	2023
Togo	23.91%	37.52%	61.43%	0.64	2023
Thailand	65.45%	63.71%	129.15%	1.03	2023
Tajikistan	16.35%	49.08%	65.44%	0.33	2022
Turkmenistan	22.23%	12.95%	35.17%	1.72	2023
Timor-Leste	55.68%	41.96%	97.64%	1.33	2022
Tonga	12.52%	60.84%	73.37%	0.21	2021
Tunisia	51.07%	58.06%	109.13%	0.88	2023
Turkey	32.27%	34.69%	66.96%	0.93	2023
Tanzania	17.80%	19.97%	37.77%	0.89	2023
Uganda	13.39%	23.84%	37.23%	0.56	2023
Ukraine	28.59%	49.51%	78.10%	0.58	2023
Uruguay	27.50%	24.24%	51.73%	1.13	2023
United States	11.63%	15.41%	27.04%	0.76	2022
Uzbekistan	26.48%	45.48%	71.96%	0.58	2023
Venezuela	16.69%	31.40%	48.09%	0.53	2014
United States Virgin Islands	91.70%	91.47%	183.17%	1.00	2021
Vietnam	93.81%	89.98%	183.79%	1.04	2022
Vanuatu	15.30%	55.46%	70.76%	0.28	2022
Samoa	28.88%	62.17%	91.06%	0.46	2023
Kosovo	39.75%	70.48%	110.23%	0.56	2023
Yemen	8.76%	50.15%	58.90%	0.17	2018
South Africa	33.02%	32.70%	65.72%	1.01	2023
Zambia	40.78%	39.11%	79.88%	1.04	2023
Zimbabwe	27.96%	37.00%	64.96%	0.76	2022
Pacific island small states	36.90%	65.73%	102.63%	0.56	2022
Least developed countries: UN classification	21.08%	27.93%	49.00%	0.75	2023
Low & middle income	24.38%	24.12%	48.49%	1.01	2023
Low-income (WB)	18.34%	30.59%	48.93%	0.60	2023
Middle-income (WB)	24.49%	24.01%	48.51%	1.02	2023
Lower middle income (WB)	27.47%	30.20%	57.67%	0.91	2023
Upper middle income (WB)	23.93%	22.42%	46.36%	1.07	2023
High-income	32.04%	31.26%	63.30%	1.02	2023
European Union	52.69%	48.96%	101.65%	1.08	2023
OECD (Organisation for Economic Cooperation and Development)	29.11%	29.36%	58.47%	0.99	2023
Notes: Imports of goods and services represent the value of all goods and other market services received from the rest of the world. Exports of goods and services represent the value of all goods and other market services provided to the rest of the world. They include the value of merchandise, freight, insurance, transport, travel, royalties, license fees, and other services, such as communication, construction, financial, information, business, personal, and government services. They exclude compensation of employees and investment income (formerly called factor services) and transfer payments.
