= Buchanan v. Warley =

- Supreme Court of the United States

Argued April 10–11, 1916 Reargued April 27, 1917 Decided November 5, 1917
- Full case name: Buchanan v. Warley
- Citations: 245 U.S. 60 (more) 38 S. Ct. 16; 62 L. Ed. 149; 1917 U.S. LEXIS 1788

Holding
- Bans on the sale of real estate to black people violate freedom of contract as protected under the Fourteenth Amendment. Kentucky Court of Appeals reversed.

Court membership
- Chief Justice Edward D. White Associate Justices Joseph McKenna · Oliver W. Holmes Jr. William R. Day · Willis Van Devanter; Mahlon Pitney · James C. McReynolds; Louis Brandeis · John H. Clarke

Case opinion
- Majority: Day, joined by unanimous

Laws applied
- U.S. Const. amend. XIV

Buchanan v. Warley, 245 U.S. 60 (1917), is a case in which the Supreme Court of the United States addressed civil government-instituted racial segregation in residential areas. The Court held unanimously that a Louisville, Kentucky, city ordinance prohibiting the sale of real property to blacks in white-majority neighborhoods or buildings and vice versa violated the Fourteenth Amendment's prohibition against denying property rights without due process of law. The ruling of the Kentucky Court of Appeals was thus reversed.

Previous state court rulings had overturned racial zoning ordinances on grounds of the "takings clause" because of their failures to grandfather land that had been owned before enactment. The Court, in Buchanan, ruled that the motive for the Louisville ordinance—separation of races for purported reasons—was an inappropriate exercise of police power, and its insufficient purpose also made it unconstitutional.

== Background ==
The city of Louisville had an ordinance that forbade any black person to own or occupy any buildings in an area in which a greater number of white persons resided, and vice versa. In 1915, William Warley, the prospective black buyer and an attorney for the National Association for the Advancement of Colored People (NAACP), made an offer to Charles H. Buchanan for his property in a predominantly white neighborhood.

He based his offer on the following condition:

It is understood that I am purchasing the above property for the purpose of having erected thereon a house which I propose to make my residence, and it is a distinct part of this agreement that I shall not be required to accept a deed to the above property or to pay for said property unless I have the right under the laws of the State of Kentucky and the City of Louisville to occupy said property as a residence.

Buchanan, a white man, accepted the offer. When Warley did not complete the transaction, Buchanan brought an action in the Chancery Court of Louisville to force him to complete the purchase. Warley argued that Louisville's ordinance prevented him from occupying the property, so it was of less value to him. Buchanan sued on the grounds that the ordinance was unconstitutional, and he should receive full payment.

== Decision ==
The Supreme Court unanimously agreed with Buchanan: "The effect of the ordinance under consideration was not merely to regulate a business or the like, but was to destroy the right of the individual to acquire, enjoy, and dispose of his property. Being of this character, it was void as being opposed to the due process clause of the constitution." Reversing the Appeals Court decision, the Supreme Court ruled that the ordinance surpassed the legitimate grounds of police power, as it interfered with individuals' rights of property. In addition, the court noted that the ordinance neither regulated the race of servants who might be employed in certain areas nor counted them as members of the household. The ruling did not address the right of owners or developers to restrict housing based on private agreements, meaning private housing restrictions against race were legally enforceable.

Justice Holmes wrote a draft opinion which suggested the case was "manufactured" by the seller and buyer. He withdrew the dissent and voted with the majority.

== See also ==
- Civil rights movement (1896–1954)
- List of United States Supreme Court cases, volume 245
