= List of United States Supreme Court cases, volume 245 =

Supreme Court of the United States
- Interactive map of Supreme Court of the United States
- 38°53′26″N 77°00′16″W
- Established: March 4, 1789; 236 years ago
- Location: Washington, D.C.
- Coordinates: 38°53′26″N 77°00′16″W
- Composition method: Presidential nomination with Senate confirmation
- Authorised by: Constitution of the United States, Art. III, § 1
- Judge term length: life tenure, subject to impeachment and removal
- Number of positions: 9 (by statute)
- Website: supremecourt.gov

This is a list of cases reported in volume 245 of United States Reports, decided by the Supreme Court of the United States in 1917 and 1918.

== Justices of the Supreme Court at the time of volume 245 U.S. ==
The Supreme Court is established by Article III, Section 1 of the Constitution of the United States, which says: "The judicial Power of the United States, shall be vested in one supreme Court . . .". The size of the Court is not specified; the Constitution leaves it to Congress to set the number of justices. Under the Judiciary Act of 1789 Congress originally fixed the number of justices at six (one chief justice and five associate justices). Since 1789 Congress has varied the size of the Court from six to seven, nine, ten, and back to nine justices (always including one chief justice).

When the cases in volume 245 were decided the Court comprised the following nine members:

| Portrait | Justice | Office | Home State | Succeeded | Date confirmed by the Senate (Vote) | Tenure on Supreme Court |
|---|---|---|---|---|---|---|
| | Edward Douglass White | Chief Justice | Louisiana | Melville Fuller | December 12, 1910 (Acclamation) | December 19, 1910 – May 19, 1921 (Died) |
| | Joseph McKenna | Associate Justice | California | Stephen Johnson Field | January 21, 1898 (Acclamation) | January 26, 1898 – January 5, 1925 (Retired) |
| | Oliver Wendell Holmes Jr. | Associate Justice | Massachusetts | Horace Gray | December 4, 1902 (Acclamation) | December 8, 1902 – January 12, 1932 (Retired) |
| | William R. Day | Associate Justice | Ohio | George Shiras Jr. | February 23, 1903 (Acclamation) | March 2, 1903 – November 13, 1922 (Retired) |
| | Willis Van Devanter | Associate Justice | Wyoming | Edward Douglass White (as Associate Justice) | December 15, 1910 (Acclamation) | January 3, 1911 – June 2, 1937 (Retired) |
| | Mahlon Pitney | Associate Justice | New Jersey | John Marshall Harlan | March 13, 1912 (50–26) | March 18, 1912 – December 31, 1922 (Resigned) |
| | James Clark McReynolds | Associate Justice | Tennessee | Horace Harmon Lurton | August 29, 1914 (44–6) | October 12, 1914 – January 31, 1941 (Retired) |
| | Louis Brandeis | Associate Justice | Massachusetts | Joseph Rucker Lamar | June 1, 1916 (47–22) | June 5, 1916 – February 13, 1939 (Retired) |
| | John Hessin Clarke | Associate Justice | Ohio | Charles Evans Hughes | July 24, 1916 (Acclamation) | October 9, 1916 – September 18, 1922 (Retired) |

== Notable Cases in 245 U.S. ==
=== Buchanan v. Warley ===
In Buchanan v. Warley, 245 U.S. 60 (1917), the Supreme Court addressed civil government-instituted racial segregation in residential areas. The Court held that a Louisville, Kentucky city ordinance prohibiting the sale of real property to blacks in white-majority neighborhoods or buildings and vice versa violated the Fourteenth Amendment's protections for freedom of contract. The Court ruled that the motive for the Louisville ordinance, separation of races for purported reasons, was an inappropriate exercise of police power, and its insufficient purpose also made it unconstitutional.

=== Selective Draft Law Cases ===
In the Selective Draft Law Cases, 245 U.S. 366 (1918), the Supreme Court upheld the Selective Service Act of 1917 and more generally upheld conscription in the United States. The Court ruled that conscription did not violate the Thirteenth Amendment's prohibition of involuntary servitude, or the First Amendment's protection of freedom of conscience.

== Citation style ==
Under the Judiciary Act of 1789 the federal court structure at the time comprised District Courts, which had general trial jurisdiction; Circuit Courts, which had mixed trial and appellate (from the US District Courts) jurisdiction; and the United States Supreme Court, which had appellate jurisdiction over the federal District and Circuit courts—and for certain issues over state courts. The Supreme Court also had limited original jurisdiction (i.e., in which cases could be filed directly with the Supreme Court without first having been heard by a lower federal or state court). There were one or more federal District Courts and/or Circuit Courts in each state, territory, or other geographical region.

The Judiciary Act of 1891 created the United States Courts of Appeals and reassigned the jurisdiction of most routine appeals from the district and circuit courts to these appellate courts. The Act created nine new courts that were originally known as the "United States Circuit Courts of Appeals". The new courts had jurisdiction over most appeals of lower court decisions. The Supreme Court could review either legal issues that a court of appeals certified or decisions of court of appeals by writ of certiorari. On January 1, 1912, the effective date of the Judicial Code of 1911, the old Circuit Courts were abolished, with their remaining trial court jurisdiction transferred to the U.S. District Courts.

Bluebook citation style is used for case names, citations, and jurisdictions.

- "# Cir." = United States Court of Appeals
  - e.g., "3d Cir." = United States Court of Appeals for the Third Circuit
- "D." = United States District Court for the District of . . .
  - e.g.,"D. Mass." = United States District Court for the District of Massachusetts
- "E." = Eastern; "M." = Middle; "N." = Northern; "S." = Southern; "W." = Western
  - e.g.,"M.D. Ala." = United States District Court for the Middle District of Alabama
- "Ct. Cl." = United States Court of Claims
- The abbreviation of a state's name alone indicates the highest appellate court in that state's judiciary at the time.
  - e.g.,"Pa." = Supreme Court of Pennsylvania
  - e.g.,"Me." = Supreme Judicial Court of Maine

== List of cases in volume 245 U.S. ==
| Case Name | Page and year | Opinion of the Court | Concurring opinion(s) | Dissenting opinion(s) | Lower Court | Disposition |
|---|---|---|---|---|---|---|
| United States v. Leary | 1 (1917) | Holmes | none | none | 4th Cir. | affirmed |
| Pennsylvania Railroad Company v. Towers | 6 (1917) | Day | none | none | Md. | affirmed |
| Bruce v. Tobin | 18 (1917) | White | none | none | S.D. | certiorari denied |
| Contributors to Pennsylvania Hospital v. City of Philadelphia | 20 (1917) | White | none | none | Pa. | affirmed |
| Lee Wilson and Company v. United States | 24 (1917) | White | none | none | 8th Cir. | affirmed |
| Smith v. Interstate Commerce Commission I | 33 (1917) | McKenna | none | none | Sup. Ct. D.C. | affirmed |
| Smith v. Interstate Commerce Commission II | 47 (1917) | McKenna | none | none | Sup. Ct. D.C. | affirmed |
| Jones v. Interstate Commerce Commission | 48 (1917) | McKenna | none | none | Sup. Ct. D.C. | affirmed |
| Cohen v. Samuels | 50 (1917) | McKenna | none | none | 2d Cir. | reversed |
| Fidelity and Columbia Trust Company v. City of Louisville | 54 (1917) | Holmes | none | none | Ky. | affirmed |
| Buchanan v. Warley | 60 (1917) | Day | none | none | Ky. | reversed |
| Ex parte Park | 82 (1917) | Day | none | none | Ct. Cust. App. | mandamus denied |
| Gauzon v. Compañía General de Tabacos de Filipinas | 86 (1917) | Day | none | none | Phil. | affirmed |
| United States v. Chase | 89 (1917) | VanDevanter | none | none | 8th Cir. | reversed |
| Eichel v. United States Fidelity and Guaranty Company | 102 (1917) | VanDevanter | none | none | 3d Cir. | affirmed |
| Hendrickson v. Apperson | 105 (1917) | McReynolds | none | none | 6th Cir. | affirmed |
| Hendrickson v. Creager | 115 (1917) | McReynolds | none | none | 6th Cir. | affirmed |
| Kelley v. Gill | 116 (1917) | Brandeis | none | none | S.D. Cal. | affirmed |
| Scharrenberg v. Dollar Steamship Company | 122 (1917) | Clarke | none | none | 9th Cir. | affirmed |
| Biddinger v. Commissioner of Police of the City of New York | 128 (1917) | Clarke | none | none | S.D.N.Y. | affirmed |
| St. Louis Southwestern Railway Company v. United States | 136 (1917) | Brandeis | none | none | W.D. Ky. | affirmed |
| Hartford Life Insurance Company v. Barber | 146 (1917) | Holmes | none | none | Mo. | reversed |
| Gould v. Gould | 151 (1917) | McReynolds | none | none | N.Y. Sup. Ct. | affirmed |
| Wear v. Kansas ex rel. Brewster | 154 (1917) | Holmes | none | none | Kan. | affirmed |
| Day v. United States | 159 (1917) | Holmes | none | none | Ct. Cl. | reversed |
| Philadelphia and Reading Coal and Iron Company v. Gilbert | 162 (1917) | VanDevanter | none | none | N.Y. Sup. Ct. | dismissed |
| United States ex rel. Arant v. Lane | 166 (1917) | White | none | none | D.C. Cir. | dismissed |
| Petersen v. Iowa ex rel. State Treasurer | 170 (1917) | White | none | none | Iowa | affirmed |
| Duus v. Brown | 176 (1917) | White | none | none | Iowa | affirmed |
| Looney, Attorney General of Texas v. Crane Company | 178 (1917) | White | none | none | N.D. Tex. | affirmed |
| Sweet v. Schock | 192 (1917) | McKenna | none | none | Okla. | reversed |
| Abercrombie and Fitch Company v. Baldwin | 198 (1917) | McKenna | none | none | 2d Cir. | affirmed |
| Stevirmac Oil and Gas Company v. Dittman | 210 (1917) | Day | none | none | E.D. Okla. | dismissed |
| Jones v. City of Portland | 217 (1917) | Day | none | none | Me. | affirmed |
| Kirk v. Olson | 225 (1917) | VanDevanter | none | none | S.D. | affirmed |
| Hitchman Coal and Coke Company v. Mitchell | 229 (1917) | Pitney | none | Brandeis | 4th Cir. | reversed |
| Eagle Glass and Manufacturing Company v. Rowe | 275 (1917) | Pitney | none | Brandeis | 4th Cir. | reversed |
| Schneider Granite Company v. Gast Realty and Investment Company | 288 (1917) | Pitney | none | none | Mo. | affirmed |
| Crew Levick Company v. Pennsylvania | 292 (1917) | Pitney | none | none | Pa. | reversed |
| Seaboard Air Line Railroad Company v. North Carolina | 298 (1917) | McReynolds | none | none | N.C. | affirmed |
| Crane v. Campbell | 304 (1917) | McReynolds | none | none | Idaho | affirmed |
| Duncan Townsite Company v. Lane | 308 (1917) | Brandeis | none | none | D.C. Cir. | affirmed |
| Hull v. Farmers' Loan and Trust Company | 312 (1917) | Brandeis | none | none | N.Y. Sup. Ct. | affirmed |
| Burton v. New York Central Railroad Company | 315 (1917) | Brandeis | none | none | N.Y. Sup. Ct. | affirmed |
| United States v. Ness | 319 (1917) | Brandeis | none | none | 8th Cir. | reversed |
| Jones v. Buffalo Creek Coal and Coke Company | 328 (1917) | Brandeis | none | none | S.D.W. Va. | dismissed |
| Korbly v. Springfield Institution for Savings | 330 (1917) | Clarke | none | none | 1st Cir. | affirmed |
| United States v. California Bridge and Construction Company | 337 (1917) | Clarke | none | none | Ct. Cl. | affirmed |
| New York ex rel. New York and Queens Gas Company v. McCall | 345 (1917) | Clarke | none | none | N.Y. Sup. Ct. | affirmed |
| McGowan v. Columbia River Packers' Association | 352 (1917) | Holmes | none | none | 9th Cir. | affirmed |
| Southern Pacific Transportation Company v. Stewart | 359 (1917) | Day | none | none] | 9th Cir. | dismissed |
| Selective Draft Law Cases | 366 (1918) | White | none | none | multiple | affirmed |
| Jones v. Perkins | 390 (1918) | White | none | none | S.D. Ga. | affirmed |
| United States v. Morena | 392 (1918) | McKenna | none | none | 3d Cir. | certification |
| Waller v. Texas and Pacific Railway Company | 398 (1918) | McKenna | none | none | 2d Cir. | affirmed |
| Union Trust Company v. Grosman | 412 (1918) | Holmes | none | none | 5th Cir. | affirmed |
| Towne v. Eisner | 418 (1918) | Holmes | none | none | S.D.N.Y. | reversed |
| Wisconsin v. Lane | 427 (1918) | Day | none | none | original | decree for defendant |
| United States v. J.S. Stearns Lumber Company | 436 (1918) | Day | none | none | W.D. Wis. | reversed |
| Houston Oil Company of Texas v. Goodrich | 440 (1918) | McReynolds | none | none | 5th Cir. | dismissed |
| Boldt v. Pennsylvania Railroad Company | 441 (1918) | McReynolds | none | none | 2d Cir. | affirmed |
| City of Cincinnati v. Cincinnati and Hamilton Traction Company | 446 (1918) | McReynolds | none | Clarke | S.D. Ohio | affirmed |
| Louisville and Nashville Railroad Company v. United States | 463 (1918) | Brandeis | none | none | W.D. Ky. | affirmed |
| Rosen v. United States | 467 (1918) | Clarke | none | none | 2d Cir. | affirmed |
| Goldman v. United States | 474 (1918) | White | none | none | S.D.N.Y. | affirmed |
| Kramer v. United States | 478 (1918) | White | none | none | S.D.N.Y. | affirmed |
| Ruthenberg v. United States | 480 (1918) | White | none | none | N.D. Ohio | affirmed |
| Missouri, Kansas and Texas Railway Company v. Texas | 484 (1918) | Holmes | none | none | Tex. Civ. App. | reversed |
| George A. Fuller Company v. Otis Elevator Company | 489 (1918) | Holmes | none | none | D.C. Cir. | reversed |
| Illinois Central Railroad Company v. State Public Utilities Commission | 493 (1918) | VanDevanter | none | none | N.D. Ill. | affirmed |
| Ketcham v. Burr | 510 (1918) | McReynolds | none | none | E.D. Mich. | dismissed |
| Martin v. Commercial National Bank of Macon | 513 (1918) | McReynolds | none | none | 5th Cir. | affirmed |
| Bates v. Bodie | 520 (1918) | McKenna | none | none | Neb. | reversed |
| Southern Pacific Company v. Darnell-Taenzer Lumber Company | 531 (1918) | Holmes | none | none | 6th Cir. | affirmed |
| Union Pacific Railroad Company v. Huxoll | 535 (1918) | Clarke | none | none | Neb. | affirmed |
| Johnson v. Lankford | 541 (1918) | McKenna | none | none | W.D. Okla. | reversed |
| Martin v. Lankford | 547 (1918) | McKenna | none | none | W.D. Okla. | affirmed |
| United States v. Woo Jan | 552 (1918) | McKenna | none | none | 6th Cir. | certification |
| Greer v. United States | 559 (1918) | Holmes | none | none | 8th Cir. | affirmed |
| Southern Pacific Company v. Stewart | 562 (1918) | Day | none | none | 9th Cir. | rehearing granted |
| United States v. Sweet | 563 (1918) | VanDevanter | none | none | 8th Cir. | reversed |
| Northern Ohio Traction and Light Company v. Ohio ex rel. Pontius | 574 (1918) | McReynolds | none | Clarke | Ohio | reversed |
| Supreme Lodge Knights of Pythias v. Smyth | 594 (1918) | Clarke | none | none | 2d Cir. | reversed |
| William Filene's Sons Company v. Weed | 597 (1918) | Holmes | none | none | 1st Cir. | reversed |
| Gardiner v. William S. Butler and Company, Inc. | 603 (1918) | Holmes | none | none | 1st Cir. | reversed |
| Stellwagen v. Clum | 605 (1918) | Day | none | none | 6th Cir. | certification |
| Weeks v. United States | 618 (1918) | VanDevanter | none | none | 2d Cir. | affirmed |
