= Openness index =

Trade Openness System

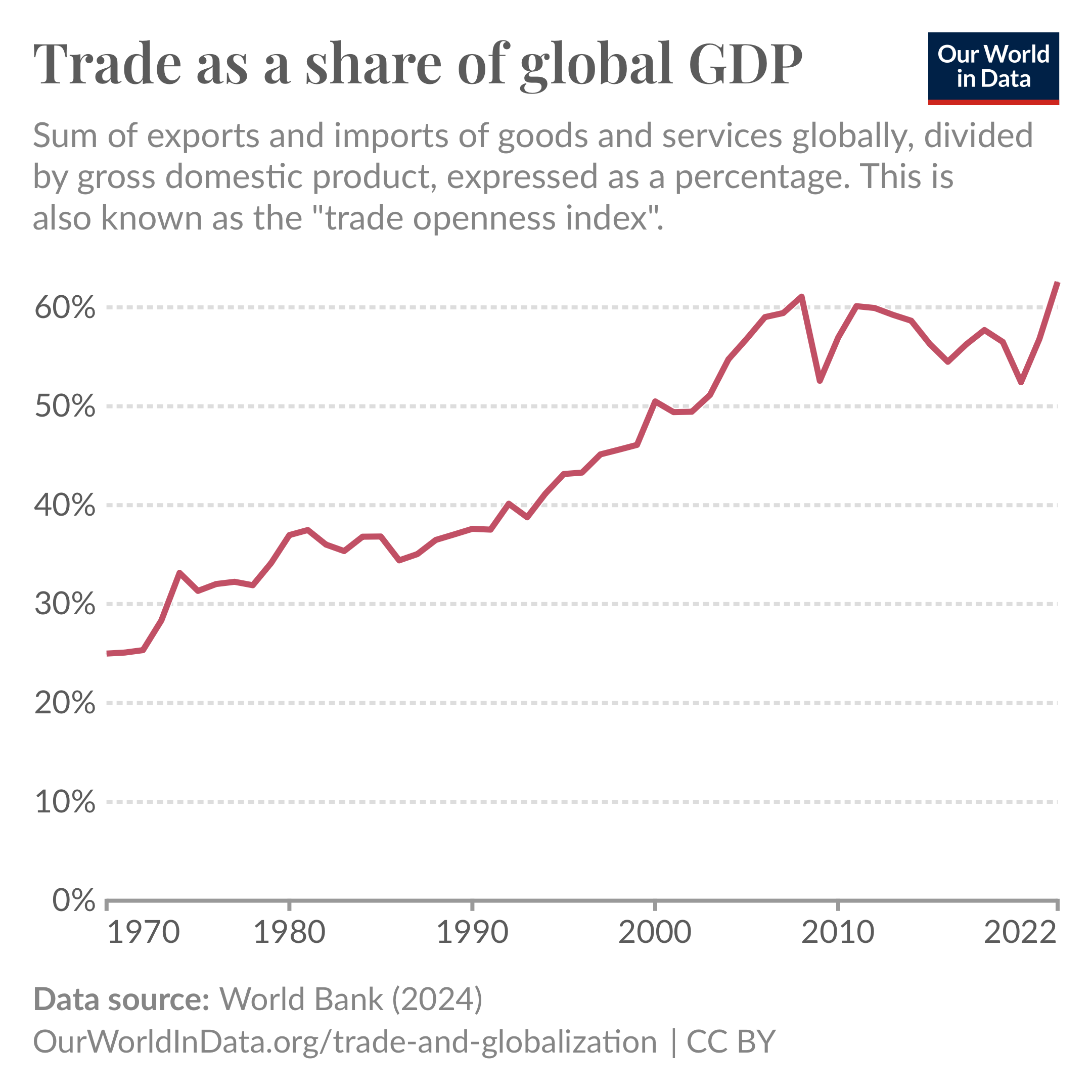
Trade as a share of global GDP (openness index)

The openness Index is an economic metric calculated as the ratio of a country's total trade, the sum of exports plus imports, to the country's gross domestic product. = (Exports + Imports)/(Gross Domestic Product)

The interpretation of the openness index is, the higher the index, the larger the influence of international trade on domestic activities and the stronger that country's economy.

== See also ==
- List of countries by trade-to-GDP ratio
