= Emer de Vattel =

Diplomat and Jurist (born 1714)

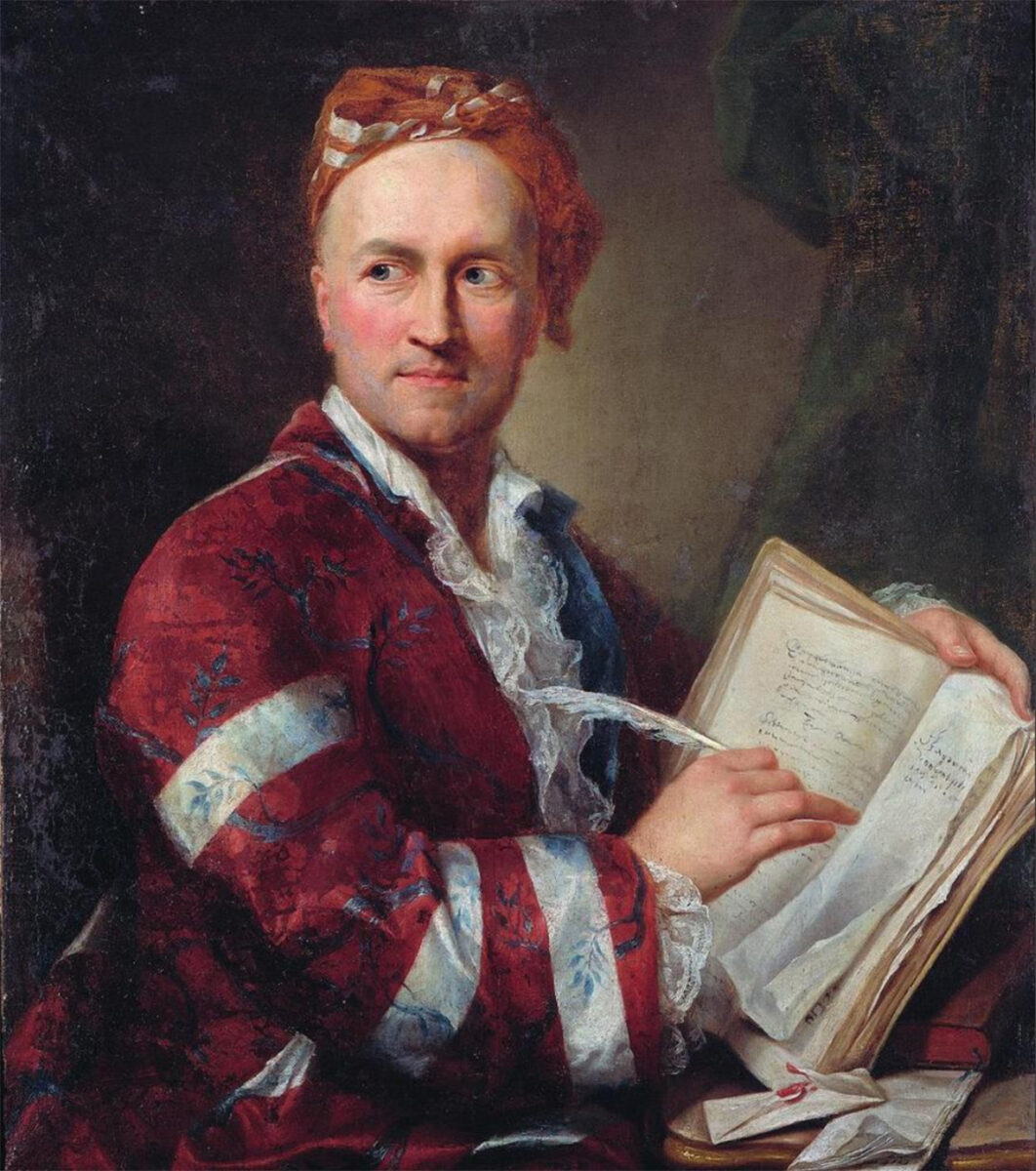
- Born: 25 April 1714; Couvet, Principality of Neuchâtel
- Died: 28 December 1767 (aged 53); Couvet, Principality of Neuchâtel

Philosophical work
- School: International law
- Main interests: International law
- Notable works: The Law of Nations

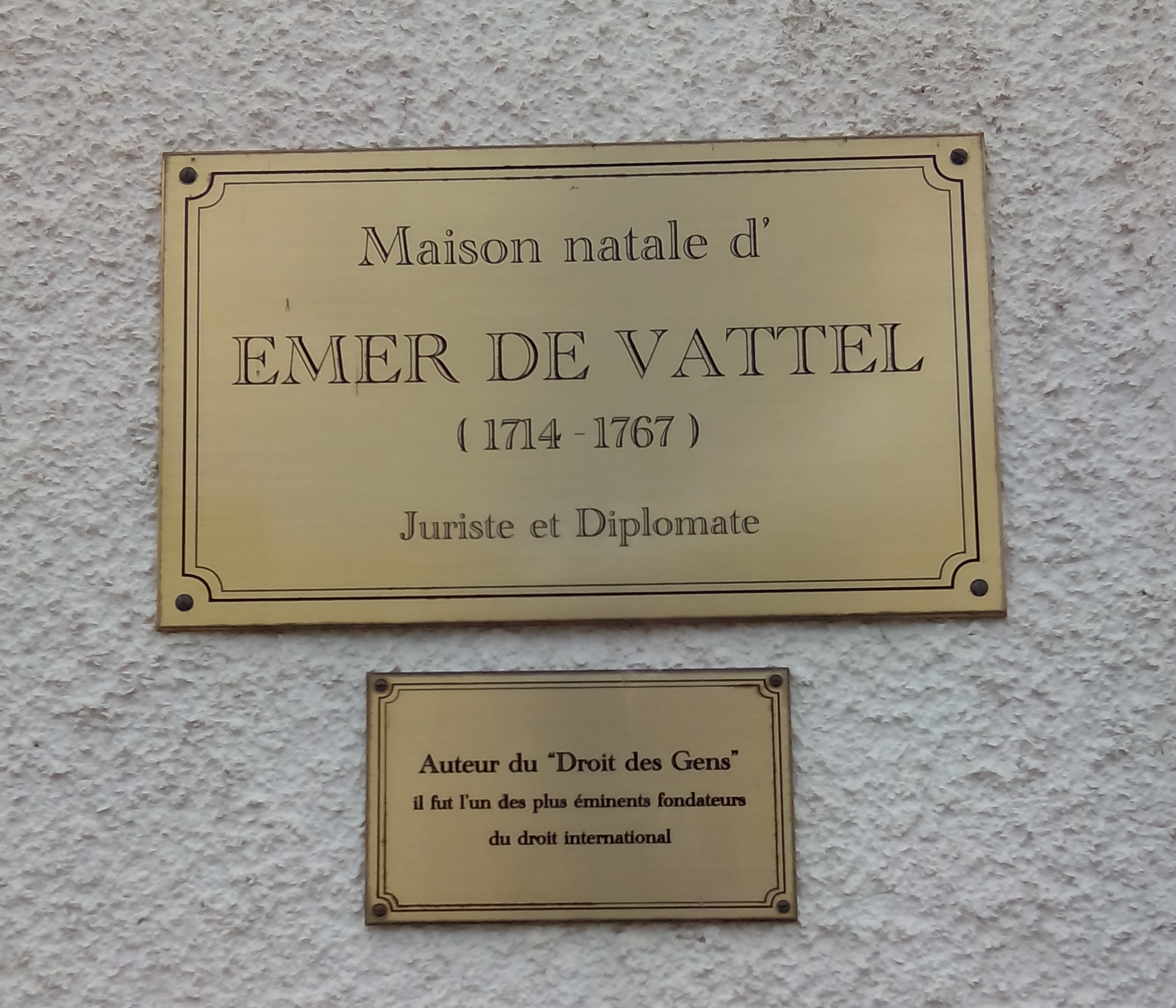
Plaque on the home of Emer de Vattel

Emmerich de Vattel (French pronunciation: [vatɛl] 25 April 1714 – 28 December 1767) was a philosopher, diplomat, and jurist.

Vattel's work profoundly influenced the development of international law. He is most famous for his 1758 work The Law of Nations. This work was his claim to fame and won him enough prestige to be appointed as a councilor to the court of Frederick Augustus II of Saxony. Vattel combined naturalist legal reasoning and positivist legal reasoning.

== Early life and career ==
The son of a Protestant minister, Vattel was born at Couvet, Principality of Neuchâtel (now the Swiss canton of Neuchâtel), on the 25th of April 1714. He studied classics and philosophy at Basel and Geneva. During his early years his favorite pursuit was philosophy and, having carefully studied the works of Leibniz and Christian Wolff, he published in 1741 a defence of Leibniz's system against Jean-Pierre de Crousaz. In the same year Vattel repaired to Berlin in the hope of obtaining some public employment from Frederick II, but was disappointed in his expectation. Two years later he proceeded to Dresden, where he experienced a very favourable reception from Count Brühl, the minister of Saxony. In 1746 he obtained from the elector, Augustus III, the title of councilor of embassy, accompanied with a pension, and was sent to Bern in the capacity of the elector's minister. His diplomatic functions did not occupy his whole time, and much of his leisure was devoted to literature and jurisprudence.

== The Law of Nations ==
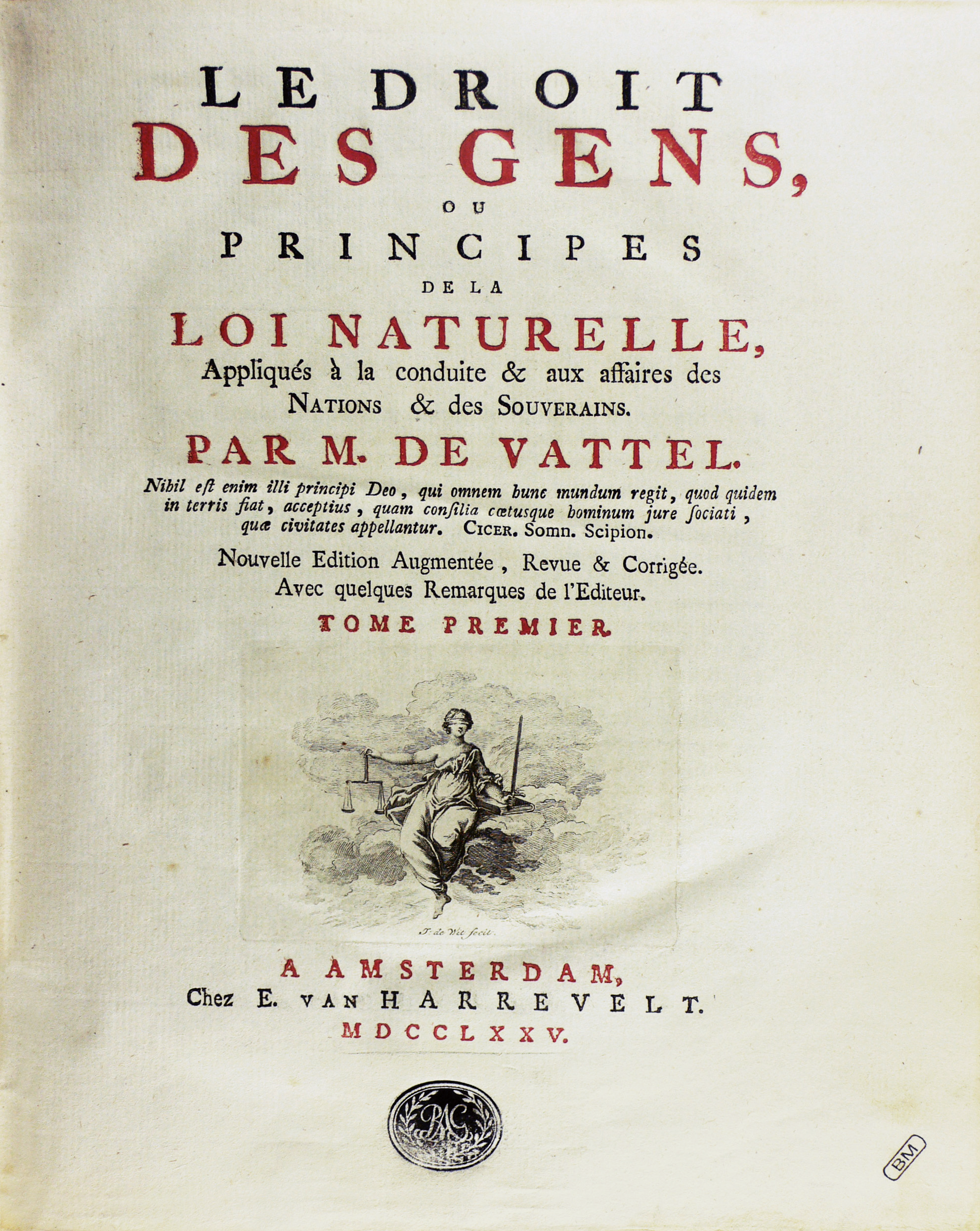
Le droit des gens, 1775

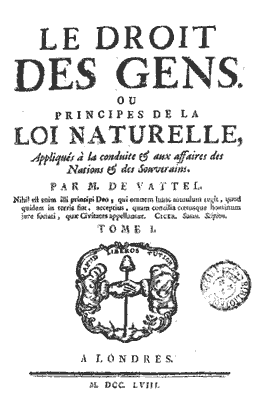
The cover page from The Law of Nations

Vattel's seminal work was largely influenced by a book titled Jus Gentium Methodo Scientifica Pertractum (The Law of Nations According to the Scientific Method) by Christian Wolff. Vattel's work began, in fact, by translating Wolff's text from Latin, and adding his own thoughts. Vattel's work was also heavily influenced by Gottfried Wilhelm Leibniz and Hugo Grotius. Focused largely on the rights and obligations of citizens and states, Vattel's work also had ramifications for Just War Theory as it outlined international diplomacy as we now know it.

Vattel elucidated the "Golden Rule of Sovereigns":

One cannot complain when he is treated as he treats others.

=== English editions ===
Vattel's Law of Nations was first translated into English in 1760, based on the French original of 1758. A Dublin translation of 1787 does not include notes from the original nor posthumous notes added to the 1773 French edition. Several other English editions were based on the edition of 1760. However, an English edition from 1793 includes Vattel's later thoughts, as did the London 1797 edition. The 1797 edition has a detailed table of contents and margin titles for subsections.

=== Benjamin Franklin ===
Charles W.F. Dumas sent Benjamin Franklin three original French copies of de Vattel's Le droit des gens (The Law of Nations). Franklin presented one copy to the Library Company of Philadelphia. On December 9, 1775, Franklin thanked Dumas:

It came to us in good season, when the circumstances of a rising State make it necessary to frequently consult the Law of Nations.

Franklin also said that this book by Vattel, "has been continually in the hands of the members of our Congress now sitting".

=== George Washington ===
Two notable copies of The Law of Nations owned by the New York Society Library have been associated with US President George Washington. One copy had been borrowed by Washington on 8 October 1789, along with a copy of Vol. 12 of the Commons Debates, containing transcripts from Great Britain's House of Commons. When the staff of the Washington museum at Mount Vernon heard about the overdue books, they were unable to locate them, but purchased a second copy of the de Vattel work for US$12,000. This identical copy was ceremoniously "returned" 221 years late on 20 May 2010. The library waived the unpaid late-fees.

== Other works ==
Vattel also published works other than his magnum opus. He worked so intensely that his health broke down, and a return to Dresden in 1766 did not improve him. His last work, Questions de droit naturel, ou Observations sur le traité du droit de la nature, par Wolff ("Questions of natural rights...") was published in 1762 and concerned Wolff's natural law philosophy. He died in 1767 during a visit to Neuchâtel.

== Influence ==
Vattel was a highly influential international lawyer. Vattel was one of a number of 18th century European scholars who wrote on international law and were "well known in America" at the time, including Jean-Jacques Burlamaqui, Cornelius van Bynkershoek, Hugo Grotius, Samuel von Pufendorf, Thomas Rutherforth, Niccolò Machiavelli, and Christian Wolff. The Law of Nations has been described as "unrivaled among such treatises in its influence on the American founders".

Vattel is also cited extensively in Lysander Spooner's The Unconstitutionality Of Slavery and appears to be a key Enlightenment thinker in Spooner's thought.

== US Department of Defense 2015 Law of War Manual ==
In 2015 the United States Department of Defense published its Law of War Manual. Vattel is cited after Hugo Grotius and before Francis Lieber and Hersch Lauterpacht as a subsidiary means and an authority in determining the rules of law of war.

== See also ==
- Samuel Pufendorf
- International law

== Sources ==
=== Primary ===
- Le loisir philosophique ou pieces diverses de philosophie, de morale et d'amusement par Mr. de Vattel, Dresde : 1747 chez George Conrad Walther via Google Books
- Le droit des gens ou Principes de la loi naturelle appliqués à la conduite et aux affaires des nations et des souverains. Tome 1 / par M. de Vattel, Londres : 1758 via Gallica
- Le droit des gens ou Principes de la loi naturelle appliqués à la conduite et aux affaires des nations et des souverains. Tome 2 / par M. de Vattel, Londres : 1758 via Gallica
- The Law of Nations (full text)
- Le droit des gens, Emer de Vattel, Translation of 1758 edition, Ed. Charles Ghequiere Fenwick
- Law of Nations, 1883 Ed. Joseph Chitty, & Edward D. Ingraham

=== Secondary ===
- Chetail, Vincent: "Vattel and the American Dream: An Inquiry into the Reception of The Law of Nations in the United States", in: Pierre-Marie Dupuy and Vincent Chetail (editors): ″The Roots of International Law / Les fondements du droit international: liber amicorum Peter Haggenmacher″, Leiden 2014, pp. 251–300.
- Gilman, Daniel Coit; Peck, Harry Thurston; Colby, Frank Moore, eds. (1904). "VATTEL, Emmerich de". The New International Encyclopaedia. Vol. XVII (TYP-ZYR). New York: Dodd, Mead and Company. p. 241. hdl:2027/mdp.39015053671221 – via HathiTrust Digital Library.
- Nussbaum, Arthur (1947). A Concise History of the Law of Nations. New York: Macmillan. pp. 155–163.
- Montmorency, James E. G. de (1913). "ÉMERICH DE VATTEL". In Macdonell, John; Manson, Edward William Donoghue (eds.). Great Jurists of the World. London: John Murray. pp. 477–504 – via Internet Archive.
- Ossipow, William and Gerber, Dominik: "The Reception of Vattel's Law of Nations in the American Colonies: From James Otis and John Adams to the Declaration of Independence", in: "American Journal of Legal History", 2017, pp. 1–35.
- Wheaton, Henry (1845). History of the Law of Nations in Europe and America from the Earliest Times to the Treaty of Washington, 1842. New York: Gould, Banks & Co. pp. 182–188 – via Internet Archive.
- (in French) Peter Haggenmacher,"Vattel, Emer de" in Dictionnaire historique de la Suisse, 02/07/2013..
- Steinhauer, Jason. "Emer Vattel and His Influence on Early America," https://blogs.loc.gov/kluge/2016/05/the-influence-of-emer-vattel/, May 6, 2016.
