= Charles W. F. Dumas =

Dutch-American diplomat (1721–1796)

Charles William Frédéric Dumas (1721 – August 11, 1796) or Charles Guillaume Frédéric Dumas was a man of letters living in the Dutch Republic who served as an American diplomat during the American Revolution.

He was born in German Ansbach to French parents, apparently lived in Switzerland for a time, and moved to the Netherlands around 1750. He befriended Benjamin Franklin when the latter was in Holland at the beginning of the American Revolution, and when Franklin chaired the Committee of correspondence, they employed Dumas as a secret agent to aid American interests in Europe. When John Adams became minister plenipotentiary to Holland, Dumas acted as his secretary and translator. When Adams went to Paris, Dumas acted as chargé d'affaires ad interim from the United States. Dumas died on August 11, 1796.

In 1775, Dumas devised the first diplomatic cipher used by the Continental Congress and Benjamin Franklin for secret correspondence with agents in Europe. It was a substitution code based on a prose passage of 682 characters, so that a given character could be replaced by more than one number.

Dumas planted stories favorable to the United States in the Gazette de Leyde (Leiden, Netherlands) with the goal of gaining a good credit rating for the United States in financial markets.

In 1776, Dumas contacted officials in Holland, Spain and France seeking trade in badly needed materials for the United States. This led to beneficial trade during the revolution. He was elected a Foreign Honorary Member of the American Academy of Arts and Sciences in 1789.

Dumas was influenced by the works of international lawyer Emer de Vattel.
