= Arthur Nussbaum =

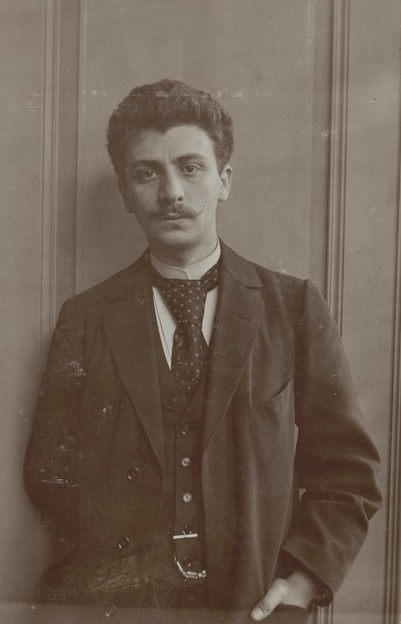
- Arthur Nussbaum
- Born: January 31, 1877; Berlin, Prussia
- Died: November 22, 1964 (aged 87); New York City, New York
- Resting place: Temple Israel Cemetery, Hastings-on-Hudson, Westchester County, New York, USA
- Citizenship: German (1877 - 1940); United States(1940 - 1964)
- Education: University of Berlin
- Occupations: Lawyer educator
- Employer(s): University of Berlin; Columbia University Law School
- Spouse: Gertrude Eyck (m. 1906–1964)
- Children: 3 daughters
- Parent(s): Bernhard Nussbaum (father); Bernadine Schuster (mother)

Arthur Nussbaum (January 31, 1877 – November 22, 1964) was a German-born American jurist.

== Biography ==
He studied legal science in Berlin from 1894 till 1897. He taught at the University of Berlin (1918–1933). In 1934, he moved to the United States, and in 1940, he became a US citizen.

He taught at Columbia Law School from 1934 until his formal retirement in 1951.

== Selected bibliography ==
- Der Polnaer Ritualmordprozess; eine kriminalpsychologische Untersuchung auf aktenmässiger Grundlage. Mit einem Vorwort von Franz von Liszt. Berlin: Druck und Verlag A.W. Hayn's Erben. 1906 – via Internet Archive.
- Die Rechtstatsachenforschung; Ihre Bedeutung für Wissenschaft und Unterricht. Tübingen: Verlag von J. C. B. Mohr (Paul Siebeck). 1914 – via Internet Archive.
- Das neue deutsche Wirtschaftsrecht : eine systematische Übersicht über die Entwicklung des Privatrechts und der benachbarten Rechtsgebiete seit Ausbruch des Weltkrieges, Berlin, Springer, 1920
- Deutsches internationales Privatrecht. Tübingen: Mohr. 1932.
- Money in the Law: National and International; A Comparative Study in the Borderline of Law and Economics (2nd ed.). Brooklyn: Foundation Press. 1950 – via Internet Archive.
- Principles of private international law. New York, London, Toronto: Oxford University Press. 1943 – via Internet Archive.
- A Concise history of the law of nations (2nd ed.). New York: Macmillan. 1954 – via Internet Archive.
- A History of the Dollar. New York: Columbia University Press. 1957 – via Internet Archive.
- Bilateral Studies in Private International Law: American - Swiss Private International Law (2nd ed.). New York: Oceana Publications. 1958 – via Internet Archive.
