= Conscription in the United States =

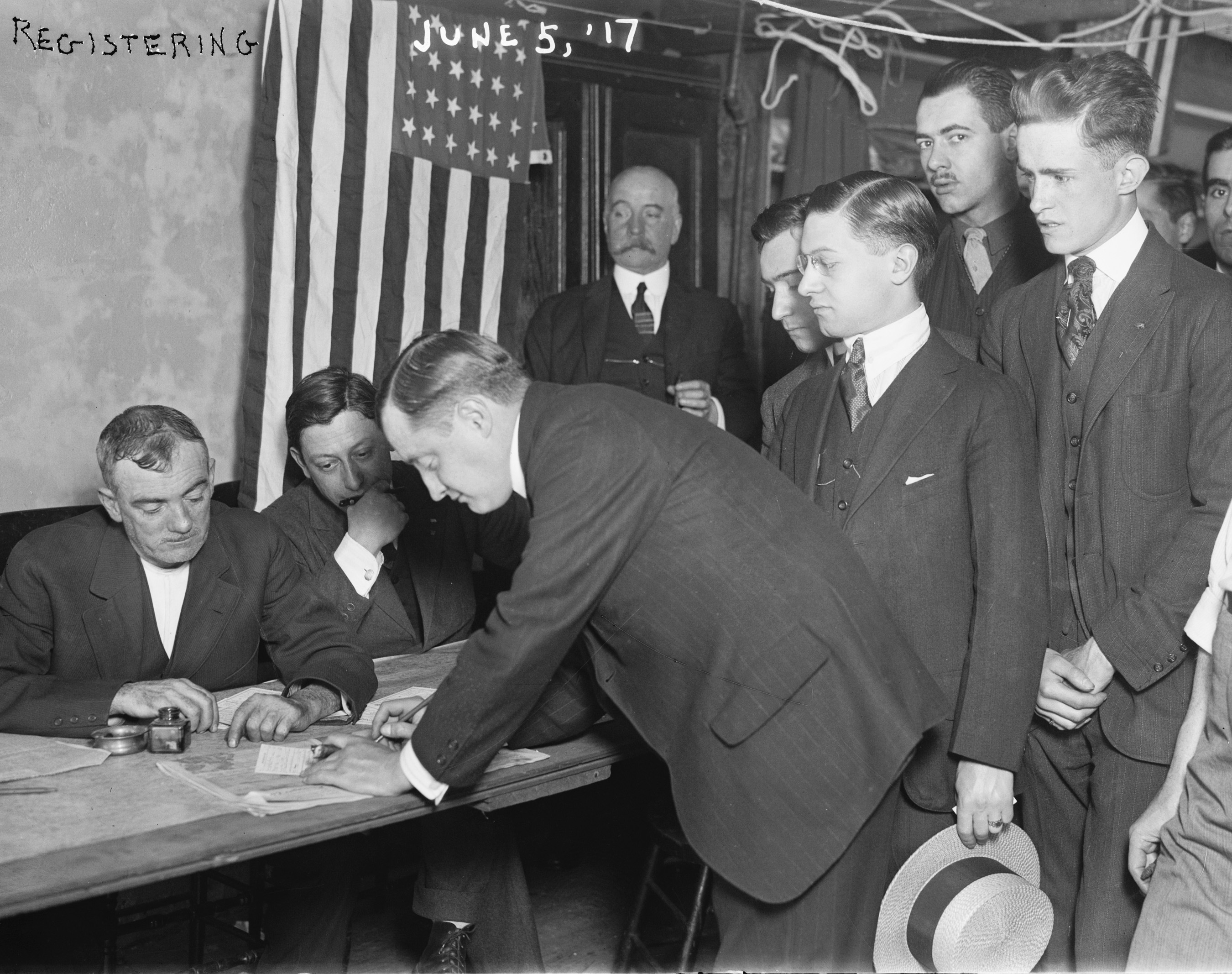
Young men registering for conscription during World War I in New York City, in June 1917

In the United States, military conscription, commonly known as "the draft", has been employed by the U.S. federal government in six conflicts: the American Revolutionary War, the American Civil War, World War I, World War II, the Korean War, and the Vietnam War. The fourth incarnation of the draft came into being in 1940, through the Selective Training and Service Act; this was the country's first peacetime draft.

From 1940 until 1973, during both peacetime and periods of conflict, men were drafted to fill vacancies in the U.S. Armed Forces that could not be filled through voluntary means. Active conscription in the United States ended in January 1973, and the U.S. Armed Forces moved to an all-volunteer military except for draftees called up through the end of 1972. Conscription remains in place on a contingency basis, however, in that all male U.S. citizens, even those residing abroad, and all male immigrants, whether documented or undocumented but residing within the United States, are required to register with the Selective Service System (SSS) between the ages of 18 and 25. Failure to register for the SSS, when otherwise required, can mean denial of federal employment, federal job training programs, and citizenship if an immigrant.

Beginning on December 18, 2026, the requirement for male U.S. residents ages 18 through 25 to register themselves with the Selective Service System will be replaced with a requirement for the Selective Service System to register them "automatically" on the basis of other federal government databases. This results from a provision of the Fiscal Year 2026 National Defense Authorization Act.

Although it has not been applied in recent American history, U.S. federal law continues to allow for compulsory conscription for militia service under emergency or extraordinary security conditions. The law is described in Article I, Section 8 of the United States Constitution and 10 U.S. Code § 246. Such conscription would apply to able-bodied men between the ages of 17 and 45 who are, or who have made a declaration of intention to become, U.S. citizens, as well as female members of the U.S. National Guard and some other women in certain health care occupations.

Conscription has faced strong opposition throughout American history from prominent figures like Daniel Webster, who stated, "A free government with an uncontrolled power of military conscription is the most ridiculous and abominable contradiction and nonsense that ever entered into the heads of men."

== History ==
=== Colonial era to 1862 ===
In colonial times, the Thirteen Colonies used a militia system for defense. Colonial militia laws—and after independence, those of the United States and the various states—required able-bodied non-enslaved males to enroll in the militia, to undergo a minimum of military training, and to serve for limited periods in war or emergency. This earliest form of conscription involved selective drafts of militiamen for service in particular campaigns. Following this system in its essentials, the Continental Congress in 1778 recommended that the states draft men from their militias for one year's service in the Continental Army; this first national conscription was applied irregularly, failing to fill the Continental ranks.

For long-term operations, conscription was occasionally used when volunteers or paid substitutes were insufficient to raise the needed manpower. During the American Revolutionary War, the states sometimes drafted men for militia duty or to fill state Continental Army units, but the central government did not have the authority to conscript except for purposes of naval impressment. The 1789 constitution lists among the enumerated powers of Congress the ability to create its own armies and navy for unlimited purposes, and to fund and regulate state militias that could be called up only for federal law enforcement and domestic defense. The new constitution also made the president of the United States the commander-in-chief of both the federal military and the militia when in federal service. The Second Militia Act of 1792 defined the first group who could be called up as 'each and every free able-bodied white male citizen of the respective states, resident therein, who is or shall be of the age of eighteen years, and under the age of forty-five years'.

The administration asserts the right to fill the ranks of the regular army by compulsion ... Is this, sir, consistent with the character of a free government? Is this civil liberty? Is this the real character of our Constitution? No, sir, indeed it is not ... Where is it written in the Constitution, in what article or section is it contained, that you may take children from their parents, and parents from their children, and compel them to fight the battles of any war, in which the folly or the wickedness of government may engage it? Under what concealment has this power lain hidden, which now for the first time comes forth, with a tremendous and baleful aspect, to trample down and destroy the dearest rights of personal liberty?

— Daniel Webster, December 9, 1814 House of Representatives Address

During the War of 1812, President James Madison and his Secretary of War James Monroe unsuccessfully attempted to create a national draft of 40,000 men. The proposal was fiercely criticized on the House floor by antiwar congressman Daniel Webster of New Hampshire.

=== Civil War ===
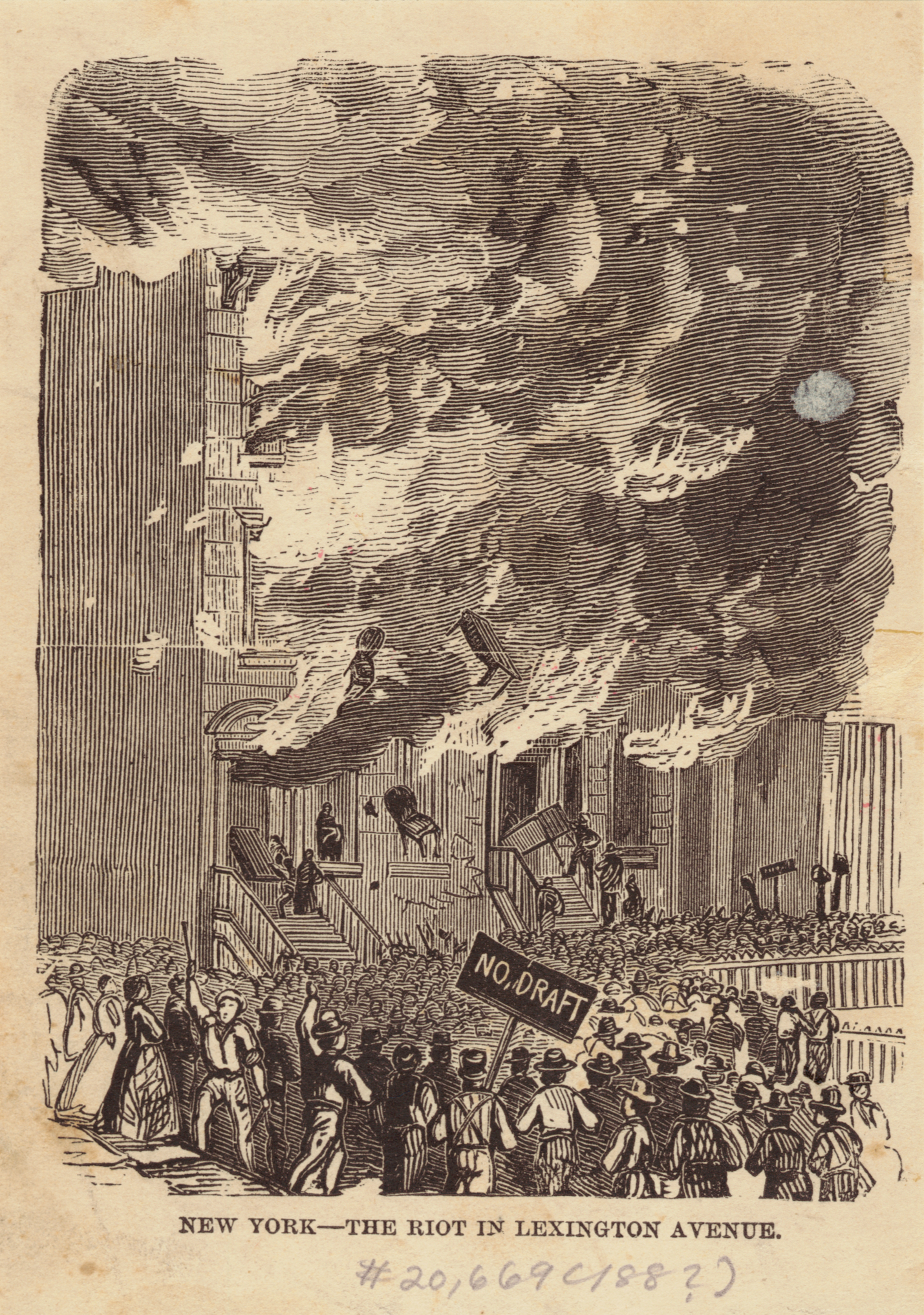
An illustration of rioters attacking a building during the New York anti-draft riots of 1863 in the middle of the American Civil War

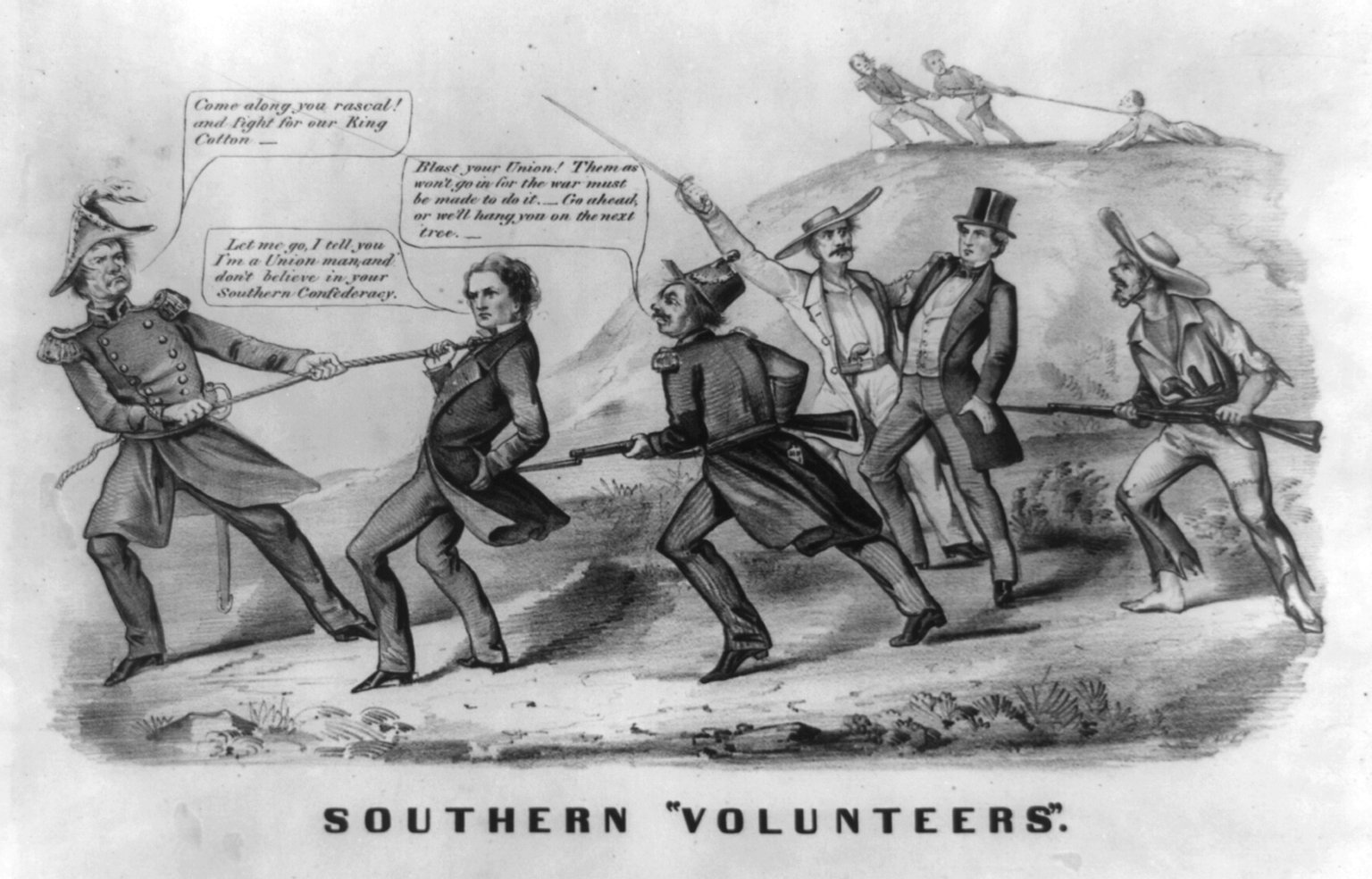
1862 Northern cartoon mocking Confederate conscription

The United States first employed national conscription during the American Civil War. The vast majority of troops were volunteers; of the 2,200,000 Union soldiers, about 2% were draftees, and another 6% were substitutes paid by draftees.

The Confederacy had far fewer inhabitants than the Union, and Confederate president Jefferson Davis proposed the first conscription act on March 28, 1862; it was passed into law the next month. Resistance was both widespread and violent, with comparisons made between conscription and slavery.

Both sides permitted conscripts to hire substitutes to serve in their place. In the Union, many states and cities offered bounties and bonuses for enlistment. They also arranged to take credit against their draft quota by claiming freed slaves who enlisted in the Union Army.

Although both sides resorted to conscription, the system did not work effectively for either. The Confederate Congress, on April 16, 1862, passed an act requiring military service for three years from all white males aged 18 to 35 not legally exempt. It later extended the obligation.

The U.S. Congress passed the Militia Act of 1862, which was similar to the 1792 Act except that it allowed African Americans to serve in state militias as soldiers and war laborers for the first time, and additionally authorized a militia draft within a state when it could not meet its quota with volunteers. This state-administered system failed in practice and Congress passed the Enrollment Act of 1863, the first genuine national conscription law, replacing the Militia Act of 1862, which required the enrollment of every male citizen and those immigrants (aliens) who had filed for citizenship, between 20 and 45 years of age, unless exempted by the Act. It set up under the Union Army an elaborate machine for enrolling and drafting men. Quotas were assigned in each state, and deficiencies in volunteers were required to be met by conscription.

Still, men who were drafted could provide substitutes, and until mid-1864 could also avoid service by paying commutation money. Many eligible men pooled their money to cover the cost of any one of them being drafted. Families used the substitute provision to select which member should go into the army and which would stay home. Another popular means of procuring a substitute was to pay a soldier whose period of enlistment was about to expire—the advantage of this method was that the Army could retain a trained veteran in place of a raw recruit. Of the 168,649 men procured for the Union Army through the draft, 117,986 were substitutes, leaving 50,663 who had their personal services conscripted. There was much evasion and overt resistance to the draft, and the New York City draft riots were in direct response to the draft and were the first large-scale resistance against the draft in the United States.

The problem of Confederate desertion was aggravated by the inequitable inclinations of conscription officers and local judges. The three conscription acts of the Confederacy exempted certain categories, such as the planter class. Enrollment officers and local judges often practiced favoritism, sometimes accepting bribes. Attempts to effectively deal with the issue were frustrated by conflict between state and local governments on the one hand and the national government of the Confederacy.

During the Civil War, there were critics against the policy of conscription. For example, Frederick Douglass, an escaped slave and abolitionist strongly advocated against the policy. Douglass asserted, "What is freedom? It is the right to choose one's own employment. Certainly it means that, if it means anything. And when any individual or combination of individuals, undertakes to decide for any man when he shall work, where he shall work, at what he shall work, and for what he shall work, he or they practically reduce him to slavery." Songs about the draft or people trying to evade it sprung up across the Union, such as "The Disconsolate Conscript" and "Come In Out of the Draft", and a particularly popular one was Henry Clay Work's comedic, satirical "Grafted into the Army" (1862). Irwin Silber comments on the song's success: "Perhaps its mixture of willingness to accept the duty of the draft, together with the implied knowledgeableness of the corruption, was the most accurate reflection of the temper of the people of the North ...".

=== National Guard ===
The Militia Act of 1903 reorganized the federally supported state militias as the National Guard, better-aligning their organization, training, and materiel with active-duty needs so they could be more quickly and efficiently put into federal service when needed. In 1933, Congress reorganized the National Guard under its Article I enumerated power to "raise and support armies" instead of its power to "Provide for organizing, arming and disciplining the Militia," avoiding the potential constraint on militia service that it can only be used "to execute the laws of the Union, suppress insurrections and repel invasions."

Able-bodied men between the ages of 17 and 45 not in the National Guard are defined in the Militia Act, and under the laws of some states, as the unorganized militia, which also may be called into state or federal service as needed.

=== World War I ===
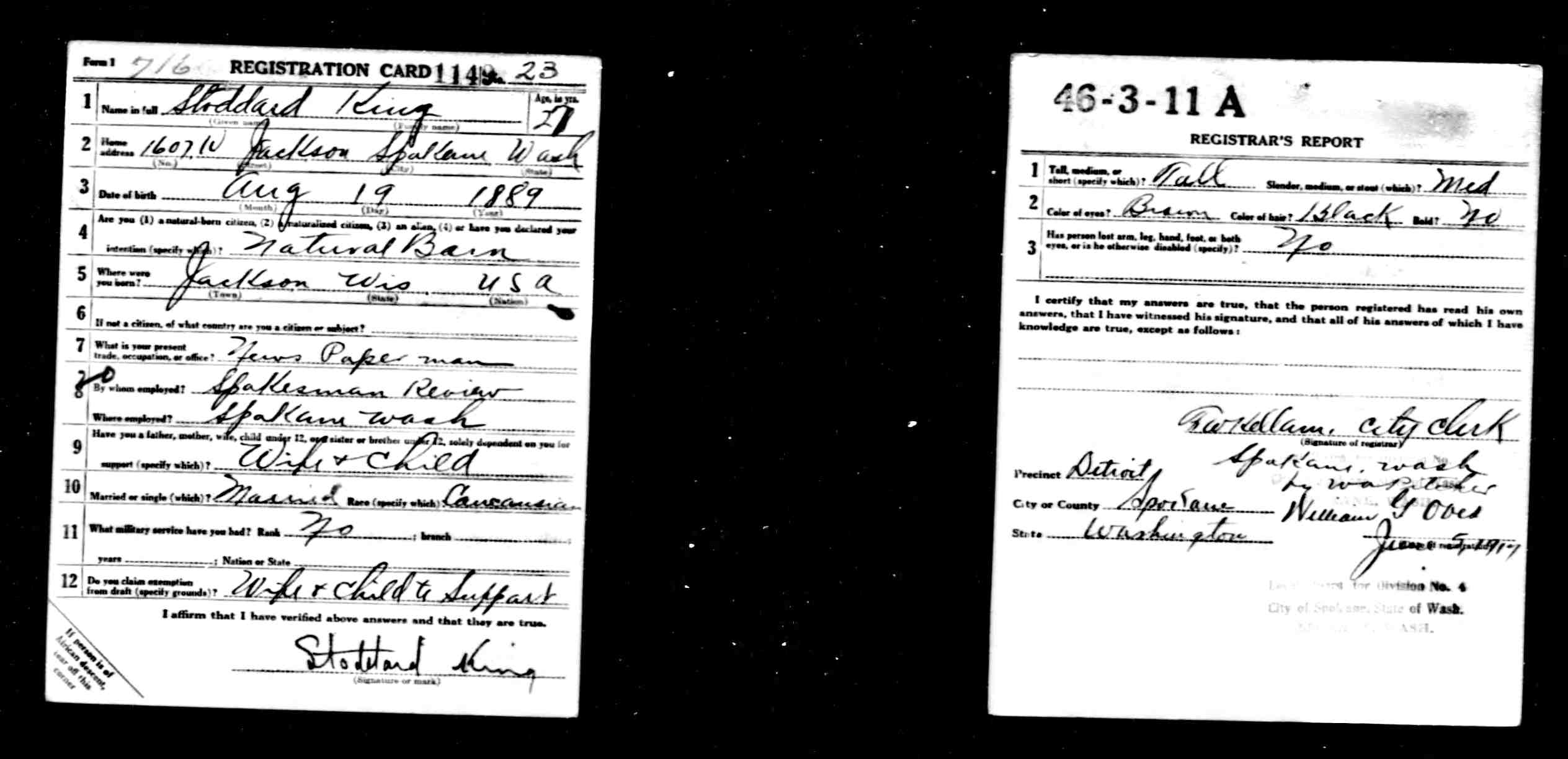
A World War I-era draft card belonging to writer Stoddard King

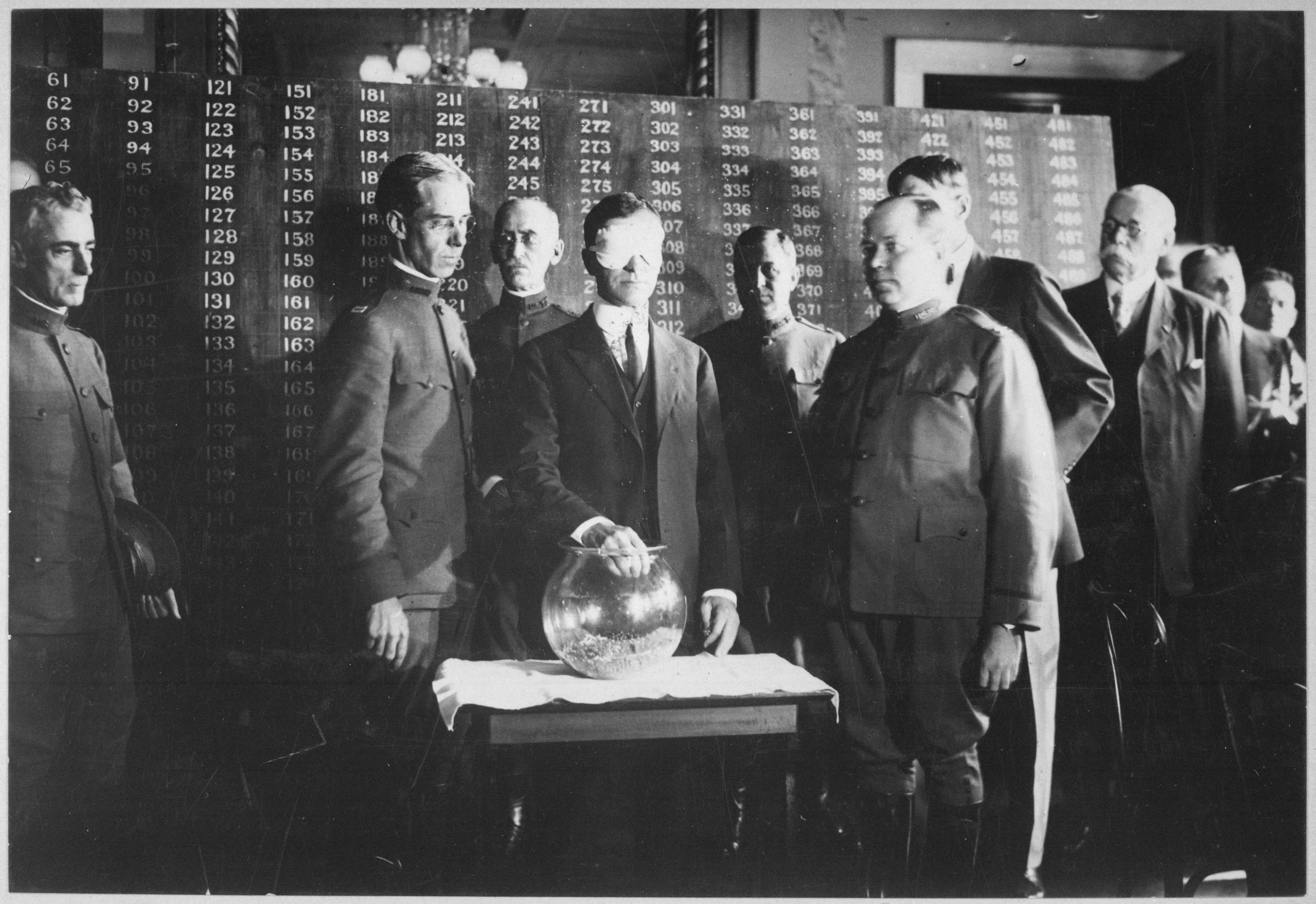
Secretary of War Newton Baker draws the first draft number on July 20, 1917

In 1917, the administration of President Woodrow Wilson decided to rely primarily on conscription, rather than voluntary enlistment, to raise military manpower for World War I when only 73,000 volunteers enlisted out of the initial 1 million target in the first six weeks of the war. One ascribed motivation was to thwart former president Theodore Roosevelt, who proposed raising a volunteer division, which would have upstaged Wilson. However, there is no evidence that Roosevelt had enough support to carry out that plan, and because Wilson had just started his second term, the former President's prospects for substantial political gain seemed dubious.

The Selective Service Act of 1917 was carefully drawn to remedy the defects in the Civil War system and—by allowing exemptions for dependency, essential occupations, and religious scruples—to place each man in his proper niche in a national war effort. The act established a "liability for military service of all male citizens"; authorized a selective draft of all those between 21 and 31 years of age (later from 18 to 45); and prohibited all forms of bounties, substitutions, or purchase of exemptions. Administration was entrusted to local boards composed of leading civilians in each community. These boards issued draft calls in order of numbers drawn in a national lottery and determined exemptions.

In 1917, 10 million men were registered. This was deemed to be inadequate, so age ranges were increased and exemptions reduced, and so by the end of 1918 24 million men were registered and nearly 3 million inducted into the military services, with little of the resistance that characterized the Civil War, thanks to a well-received campaign by the government to increase support for the war. The government also shut down newspapers and magazines that published articles against the war, but there was still resistance in some areas, such as the Green Corn Rebellion.

The draft was universal and included black men on the same terms as whites, although they served in different units. In all 367,710 black Americans were drafted (13% of the total), compared to 2,442,586 white (86.9%). Along with a general opposition to American involvement in a foreign conflict, Southern farmers objected to perceived unfair conscription practices that exempted members of the upper class and industrial workers.

Draft boards were localized and based their decisions on social class: the poorest were the most often conscripted because they were considered the least likely to be the skilled labor needed for the war effort. Poor men were also less likely to convince local boards that they were primary breadwinners who could be deferred to support dependents. Forms of resistance ranged from peaceful protest to violent demonstrations and from humble letter-writing campaigns asking for mercy to newspapers demanding reform. The most common tactics were dodging and desertion, and some communities in isolationist areas even sheltered and defended their draft dodgers as political heroes.

Nearly half a million immigrants were drafted, which forced the military to develop training procedures that took ethnic differences into account. Military leaders invited Progressive reformers and ethnic group leaders to assist in formulating new military policies. The military attempted to socialize and Americanize young immigrant recruits, not by forcing "angloconformity", but by showing remarkable sensitivity and respect for ethnic values and traditions and a concern for the morale of immigrant troops, with the aim of blending them into the larger society. Sports activities, keeping immigrant groups together, newspapers in various languages, the assistance of bilingual officers, and ethnic entertainment programs were all employed.

==== Opposition ====
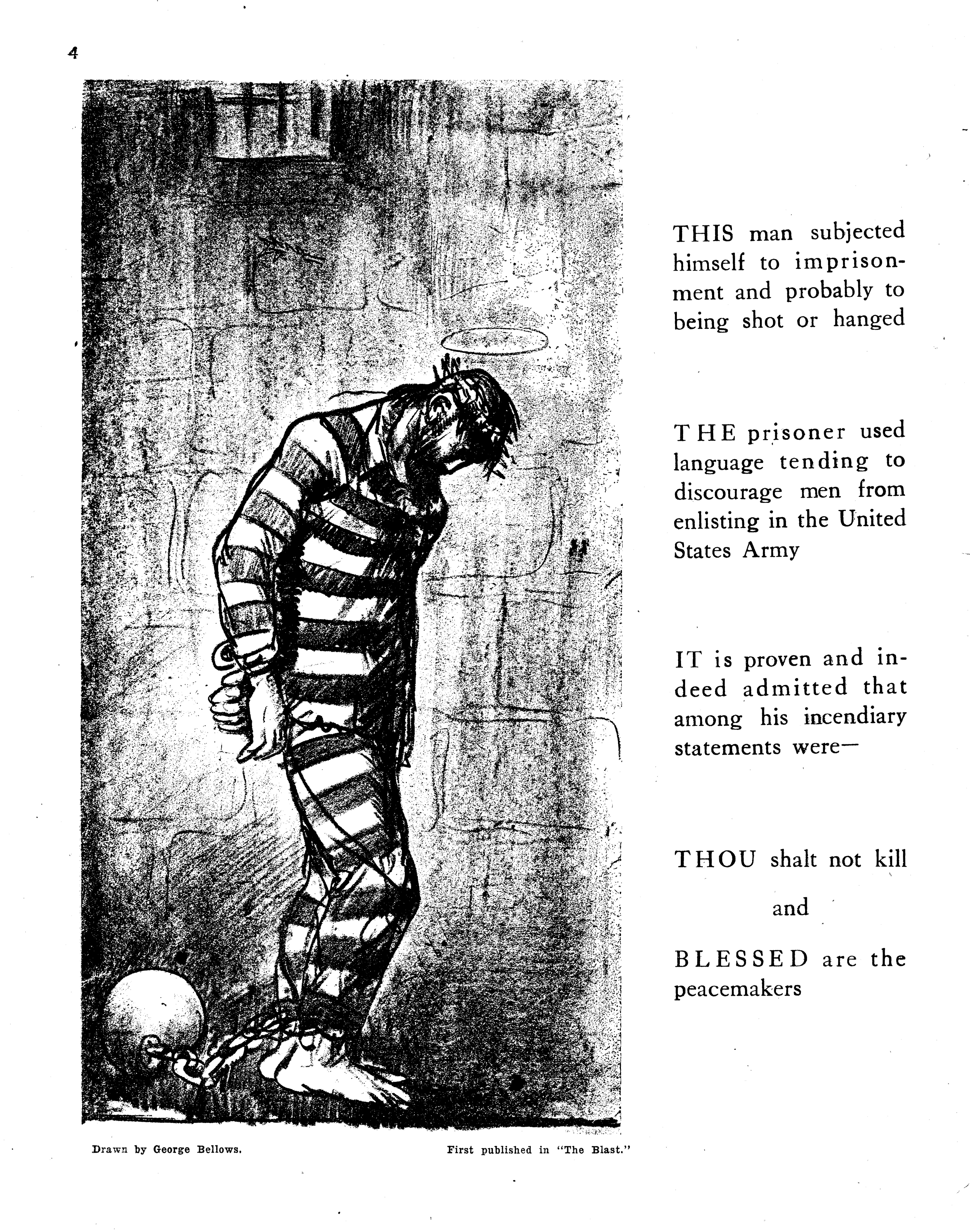
Blessed are the Peacemakers by George Bellows, published in 1917

The Conscription Act of 1917 was passed in June. Conscripts were court-martialed by the Army if they refused to wear uniforms, bear arms, perform basic duties, or submit to military authority. Convicted objectors were often given long sentences of 20 years in Fort Leavenworth. In 1918, Secretary of War Newton D. Baker created the Board of Inquiry to question the conscientious objectors' sincerity. Military tribunals tried men found by the Board to be insincere for a variety of offenses, sentencing 17 to death, 142 to life imprisonment, and 345 to penal labor camps. Many of these sentences were commuted after the war's end.

In 1917, a number of radicals and anarchists, including Emma Goldman, tried to challenge the new draft law in federal court, arguing that it was a direct violation of the Thirteenth Amendment's prohibition against slavery and involuntary servitude. The Supreme Court unanimously upheld the constitutionality of the draft act in the Selective Draft Law Cases on January 7, 1918. The decision said the Constitution gave Congress the power to declare war and to raise and support armies. The Court, relying partly on Emerich de Vattel's The Law of Nations, emphasized the principle of the reciprocal rights and duties of citizens:

It may not be doubted that the very conception of a just government and its duty to the citizen includes the reciprocal obligation of the citizen to render military service in case of need, and the right to compel it. To do more than state the proposition is absolutely unnecessary in view of the practical illustration afforded by the almost universal legislation to that effect now in force.

Conscription was unpopular from left-wing sectors at the start, with many Socialists jailed for "obstructing the recruitment or enlistment service". The most famous was Eugene Debs, head of the Socialist Party of America, who ran for president in 1920 from his Atlanta prison cell. He had his sentence commuted to time served and was released by President Warren G. Harding on December 25, 1921. Also notably, the Industrial Workers of the World attempted to obstruct the war effort through strikes in war-related industries and not registering, but it did not meet with large success.

Although draft riots were not widespread, an estimated 171,000 people never registered for the draft, while another 360,000 people never responded to induction orders.

==== Conscientious objectors in WWI ====
Conscientious objector (CO) exemptions were allowed for the Amish, Mennonites, Quakers, and Church of the Brethren only. All other religious and political objectors were forced to participate. Some 64,700 men claimed conscientious objector status; local draft boards certified 57,000, of whom 30,000 passed the physical and 21,000 were inducted into the U.S. Army. About 80% of the 21,000 decided to abandon their objection and take up arms, but 3,989 drafted objectors refused to serve. Most belonged to historically pacifist denominations, especially Quakers, Mennonites, and Moravian Brethren, as well as a few Seventh-day Adventists and Jehovah's Witnesses. About 15% were religious objectors from non-pacifist churches.

Ben Salmon was a nationally known political activist who encouraged men not to register and personally refused to comply with the draft procedures. He rejected the Army Review Board proposal that he perform noncombatant farm work. Sentenced to 25 years in prison, he again refused a proposed desk job. He was pardoned and released in November 1920 with a "dishonorable discharge."

=== Interwar ===
The draft ended in 1918, but the Army designed the modern draft mechanism in 1926 and built it based on military needs, despite an era of pacifism. Working where Congress would not, it gathered a cadre of officers for its nascent Joint Army-Navy Selective Service Committee, most of whom were commissioned based on social standing rather than military experience. This effort did not receive congressionally approved funding until 1934, when Major General Lewis B. Hershey was assigned to the organization. The passage of a conscription act was opposed by some, including Dorothy Day and George Barry O'Toole, who were concerned that such conscription would not provide adequate protection for the rights of conscientious objectors. However, much of Hershey's work was codified into law with the Selective Training and Service Act of 1940 (STSA).

=== World War II ===
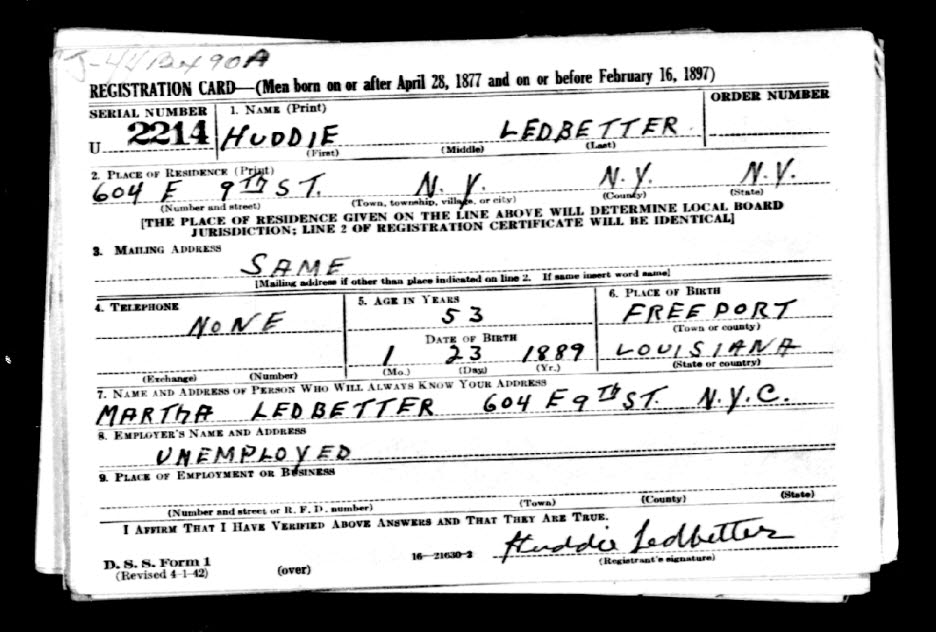
World War II-era draft card belonging to musician Huddie Ledbetter, better known as Lead Belly

In the summer of 1940, after Nazi Germany conquered France, Americans supported the return of conscription. One national survey found that 67% of respondents believed that a German-Italian victory would endanger the United States, and that 71% supported "the immediate adoption of compulsory military training for all young men". Similarly, a November 1942 survey of American high-school students found that 69% favored compulsory postwar military training.

The World War I system served as a model for that of World War II. President Roosevelt's signing of the Selective Training and Service Act on September 16, 1940, began the first peacetime draft in the United States. The 1940 law instituted conscription in peacetime, requiring the registration of all men between 21 and 35. It also reestablished the Selective Service System as an independent agency responsible for identifying young men and facilitating their military service. Roosevelt named Lewis B. Hershey to head the System on July 31, 1941; he remained in post until 1969. This act came when other preparations, such as increased training and equipment production, had not yet been approved. Nevertheless, it served as the basis for the conscription programs that continue to the present.

The act set a cap of 900,000 men to be in training at once, and limited military service to 12 months unless Congress deemed it necessary to extend such service in the interest of national defense. An amendment added 18 more months to this service period on August 18, 1941. After the Pearl Harbor attack the STSA was further amended (December 19, 1941), extending the term of service to the duration of the war plus six months and requiring the registration of all men 18 to 64 years of age. During World War II, 49 million men were registered, 36 million classified, and 10 million inducted. 18- and 19-year-olds were made liable for induction on November 13, 1942. By late 1942, the Selective Service System moved away from a national lottery to administrative selection by its more than 6,000 local boards.

On December 5, 1942, presidential Executive Order 9279 closed voluntary enlistment for all men from the ages of 18 to 37 for the duration of the war, providing protection for the nation's home front manpower pool. The Navy and Marine Corps began procuring their personnel through the Selective Service System in early 1943. The Navy and Marine Corps enlisted inductees and volunteers under the same service agreements, but with different service obligations, while the Army placed wartime inductees and volunteers into a special service component known as the Army of the United States, commonly known as the "AUS"; service commitments were set at the length of the war plus six months.

Paul V. McNutt, head of the War Manpower Commission, estimated that the changes would increase the ratio of men drafted from one out of nine to one out of five. The commission's goal was to have nine million men in the armed forces by the end of 1943. This facilitated the massive requirement of up to 200,000 men per month and would remain the standard for the length of the war.

The World War II draft operated from 1940 until 1946 when further inductions were suspended, and its legislative authorization expired without further extension by Congress in 1947. During this time, more than 10 million men had been inducted into military service. However, the Selective Service System remained intact.

==== Opposition ====
Draft evasion accounted for about 4% of the total inducted. About 373,000 alleged evaders were investigated with just over 16,000 being imprisoned. Opposition was nonetheless encountered, especially in the northern cities where some African-Americans protested the system. The Nation of Islam was at the forefront, with many Black Muslims jailed for refusing the draft, and their leader Elijah Muhammad was sentenced to federal prison for 5 years for inciting draft resistance. Organized draft resistance also developed in the Japanese American internment camps, where groups like the Heart Mountain Fair Play Committee refused to serve unless they and their families were released. 300 Nisei men from eight of the ten War Relocation Authority camps were arrested and stood trial for felony draft evasion; most were sentenced to federal prison. American Communists also opposed the war by forming the "American Peace Committee", which tried to organize a coalition of anti-war groups. This lasted until Germany attacked the Soviet Union in June 1941, whereupon they changed the committee's name to the "American People's Committee" and supported aid to Britain, the draft and other preparations for war.

==== Conscientious objectors in WWII ====
Of the more than 72,000 men registering as conscientious objectors (CO), nearly 52,000 received CO status. Of these, over 25,000 entered the military in noncombatant roles, another 12,000 went to the Civilian Public Service program, and nearly 6,000 were imprisoned for having refused any service.

=== Early Cold War and Korean War ===
The second peacetime draft began with passage of the Selective Service Act of 1948 after the STSA expired. The new law required all men of age 18 to 26 to register. It also created the system for the "Doctor Draft", aimed at inducting health professionals into military service. Unless otherwise exempted or deferred (see Berry Plan), these men could be called for up to 21 months of active duty and five years of reserve duty service. Congress further tweaked this act in 1950 although the post–World War II surplus of military manpower left little need for draft calls until President Harry S. Truman's declaration of a national emergency in December 1950. Only 20,348 men were inducted in 1948 and only 9,781 in 1949.

Between the Korean War's outbreak in June 1950 and the armistice agreement in 1953, Selective Service inducted over 1.5 million men. Another 1.3 million volunteered, usually choosing the Navy or Air Force. Congress passed the Universal Military Training and Service Act in 1951 to meet the demands of the war. It lowered the induction age to 18½ and extended active-duty service commitments to 24 months. Despite the early combat failures and later stalemate in Korea, the draft has been credited by some as playing a vital role in turning the tide of war. A February 1953 Gallup Poll showed that 70 percent of Americans surveyed felt that the SSS had handled the draft fairly. Gallup reported that 64 percent of the demographic group including all draft age men (males 21 to 29) believed the draft to be fair.

To improve equity in the system, President Dwight D. Eisenhower signed an executive order on July 11, 1953, that ended the paternity deferment for married men. In large part, the change in the draft served the purposes of the burgeoning Cold War. From a program that had just barely passed Congressional muster during the fearful prelude to World War II, a more robust draft continued as fears now focused on the Soviet threat. Nevertheless, some dissenting voices in Congress continued to advocate for voluntary military service.

The onset of the Cold War coincided with men born during the Great Depression beginning to reach military age. Hershey and other supporters of the draft frequently pointed out that the Depression had resulted in a substantial reduction of the birth rate in order to back up their doubts regarding the return to an all-volunteer military at a time when it was known that the number of men reaching military age was going to fall significantly. The Korean War era marked the first time that any form of student deferment had been used. During the Korean War, a student carrying at least 12 semester hours was exempt until the end of his current semester.

Though the United States signed the Korean War Armistice on July 27, 1953, technology brought new promises and threats. American air and nuclear power fueled the Eisenhower doctrine of "massive retaliation." This strategy demanded more machines and fewer foot soldiers, so the draft slipped to the back burner. However, SSS director Gen. Hershey urged caution, fearing the conflict looming in Vietnam. In May 1953, he told his state directors to do everything possible to keep the SSS alive in order to meet expected needs.

Following the 1953 Korean War Armistice, Congress passed the Reserve Forces Act of 1955 with the aim of improving National Guard and federal Reserve Component readiness while also constraining its use by the president. Toward this end, it mandated a six-year service commitment, in a combination of reserve and active duty time, for every line military member regardless of their means of entry. Meanwhile, the SSS kept itself alive by devising and managing a complex system of deferments for a swelling pool of candidates during a period of shrinking requirements. The greatest challenge to the draft came not from protesters but from lobbyists seeking additional deferments for their constituent groups such as scientists and farmers.

Many government leaders felt that the potential for a draft was a critical element in maintaining a constant flow of volunteers. On numerous occasions, General Hershey told Congress that for every man drafted, three or four more were scared into volunteering. Assuming that his assessment was accurate, this would mean that more than 11 million men volunteered for service because of the draft between January 1954 and April 1975.

The policy of using the draft to incentivize voluntary enlistment was unique in American history. Previous drafts had not aimed to encourage individuals to enlist in order to gain preferential placement or less dangerous postings. However, the incremental buildup of the Vietnam War without a clear threat to the country bolstered this focus. Some estimates suggest that almost one-third of all eligible men were conscripted during the period of 1965–69. This group represented those without exemption or resources to avoid military service. During the active combat phase, the possibility of avoiding combat by selecting their service and military specialty led as many as four out of 11 eligible men to enlist. The military relied upon draft-induced volunteerism to meet its quotas, especially for the Army, which accounted for nearly 95% of all inductees during the Vietnam War era. For example, defense recruiting reports show that 34% of the recruits in 1964, up to 50% in 1970, indicated that they had joined voluntarily in order to avoid placement uncertainty via the draft. These rates dwindled to 24% in 1972 and 15% in 1973 after the change to a lottery system. Accounting for other factors, it can be argued up to 60% of those who served throughout the Vietnam War era did so directly or indirectly because of the draft.

In addition, deferments provided an incentive for men to follow pursuits considered useful to the state. This process, known as channeling, helped push men into educational, occupational, and family choices that they might not otherwise have pursued. Undergraduate degrees were valued. Graduate work had varying value over time, though technical and religious training received nearly constant support. War-industry support in the form of teaching, research, or skilled labor also received deferred or exempt status. Finally, married and family men were exempted because of the positive social consequences. This included using presidential orders to extend exemptions again to fathers and others. Channeling was also seen as a means of preempting the early loss of the country's "best and brightest" who had historically joined and died early in war.

In the only extended period of military conscription of U.S. males during a major peacetime period, the draft continued on a more limited basis during the late 1950s and early 1960s. While a far smaller percentage of eligible males were conscripted than in war periods, draftees by law served in the Army for two years. Elvis Presley and Willie Mays were two of the most famous people drafted during this period.

Public protests in the United States were few during the Korean War. However, the percentage of CO exemptions for inductees grew to 1.5%, compared to a rate of just .5% in the past two wars. The Justice Department also investigated more than 80,000 draft-evasion cases.

=== Vietnam War ===
Conscription letter issued during the Vietnam War

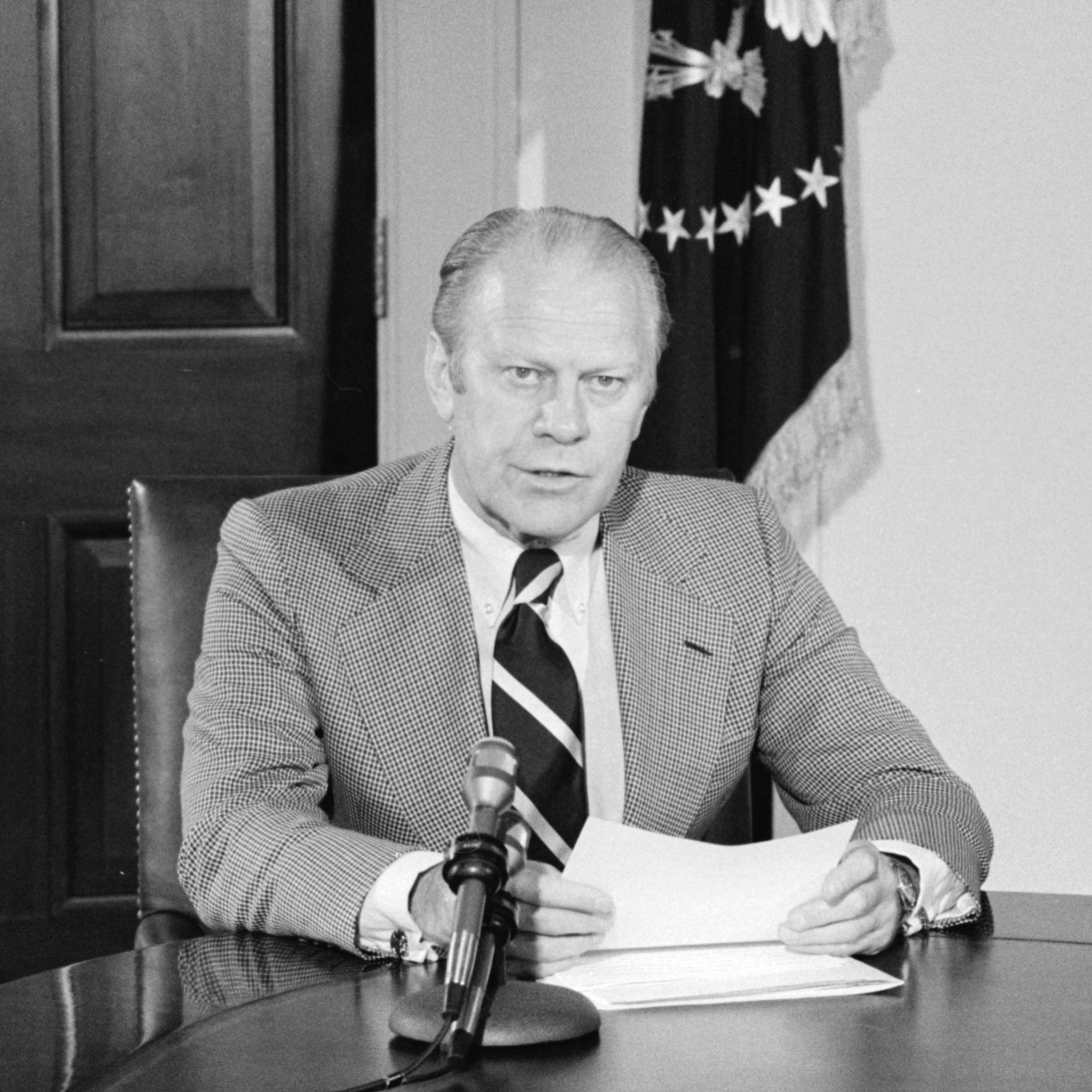
President Gerald Ford announces amnesty for draft evaders at the White House in 1974

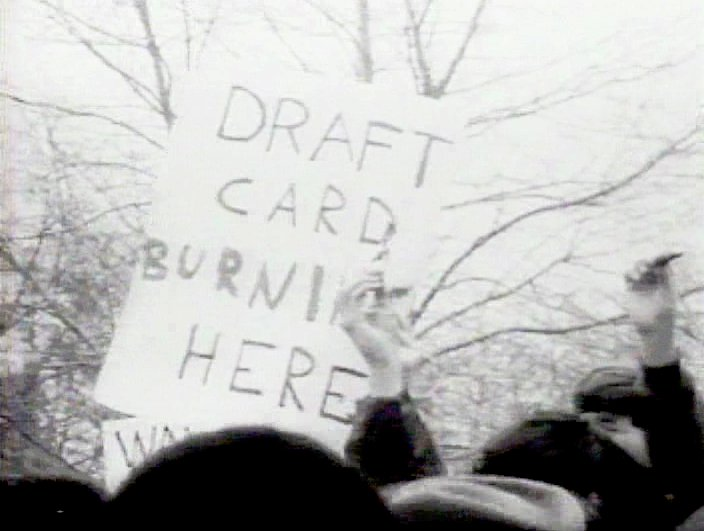
Young men burn their draft cards at Sheep Meadow in Central Park, New York City, on April 15, 1967

President John F. Kennedy's decision to send military troops to Vietnam as advisors was a signal that Selective Service Director Lewis B. Hershey needed to visit the Oval Office. From that visit emerged two wishes of JFK with regard to conscription. The first was that the names of married men with children should occupy the very bottom of the callup list. Just above them should be the names of men who were married. This policy was implemented in practice, but was not encoded into statute by Congress. Men who fit into these categories became known as Kennedy Husbands.

Many early rank-and-file anti-conscription protesters had been allied with the National Committee for a Sane Nuclear Policy. The signing in 1963 of the Limited Nuclear Test Ban Treaty left them free to focus on other issues. Syndicated cartoonist Al Capp portrayed them as S.W.I.N.E. (Students Wildly Indignant About Nearly Everything). Protest activity increased after the 1964 Gulf of Tonkin Resolution.

Consequently, there was some opposition to the draft even before the major U.S. involvement in the Vietnam War began. The large cohort of Baby Boomers who became eligible for military service during the Vietnam War allowed a steep increase in the number of exemptions and deferments, especially for college students. Besides being able to avoid the draft, college graduates who volunteered for military service (primarily as commissioned officers) had a much better chance of securing a preferential posting compared to less-educated inductees. Contrary to popular belief, the large majority of American soldiers who participated in the war, and who were killed in combat, were in fact volunteers and not draftees.

As U.S. troop strength in South Vietnam increased, more young men were drafted for service there, and many of those still at home sought means of avoiding the draft. Since only 15,000 National Guard and Reserve soldiers were sent to South Vietnam, enlistment in the Guard or the Reserves became a popular means of avoiding serving in a war zone. For those who could meet the more stringent enlistment standards, service in the Air Force, Navy, or Coast Guard was a means of reducing the chances of being killed. Vocations to the priesthood, the ministry, and the rabbinate soared, because divinity students were exempt from the draft. Doctors and draft board members found themselves being pressured by relatives or family friends to exempt potential draftees.

The marriage deferment ended suddenly on August 26, 1965. Around 3:10 pm, President Johnson signed an order allowing the draft of men who married after midnight that day, then around 5 pm, he announced the change for the first time. This caused a last-minute rush to the altar by thousands of American couples.

Some conscientious objectors objected to the war based on the theory of Just War. One of these, Stephen Spiro, was convicted of avoiding the draft, but given a suspended sentence of five years. He was later pardoned by President Gerald Ford.

Between 1964 and 1973, 9,087,000 men and women would serve in the armed forces in some capacity. Of these, 2,594,000 would be deployed to Vietnam. 1,766,910 would be drafted into the military serving throughout the world. Most of those who were drafted went into the Army and fewer than 42,700 went into the Marine Corps. The Navy and Air Force did not accept draftees.

From a pool of approximately 27 million, the draft raised 2,215,000 men for military service (in the United States, South Vietnam, and elsewhere) during the Vietnam War era. The majority of service members deployed to South Vietnam were volunteers, even though hundreds of thousands of men opted to join the Army, Air Force, Navy, and Coast Guard (for three or four year terms of enlistment). If drafted, they would only serve for two years, but would have no choice over their military occupational specialty.

Of the nearly 16 million men not engaged in active military service, 96% were exempted (typically because of jobs including other military service), deferred (usually for educational reasons), or disqualified (usually for physical and mental deficiencies but also for criminal records including draft violations). The requirements for obtaining and maintaining an educational deferment changed several times in the late 1960s. For several years, students were required to take an annual qualification test. In 1967 educational deferments were changed for graduate students. Those starting graduate studies in the fall of 1967 were given two semester deferments becoming eligible in June 1968. Those further along in their graduate study who entered prior to the summer of 1967 could continue to receive a deferment until they completed their studies. Peace Corps Volunteers were no longer given deferments and their induction was left to the discretion of their local boards. However most boards allowed Peace Corps Volunteers to complete their two-year assignment before inducting them into the military. On December 1, 1969, a lottery was held to establish a draft priority for all those born between 1944 and 1950. Those with a high number no longer had to be concerned about the draft. Nearly 500,000 men were disqualified for criminal records, but fewer than 10,000 of them were convicted of draft violations. Finally, as many as 100,000 eligible men fled the country.

=== End of conscription ===
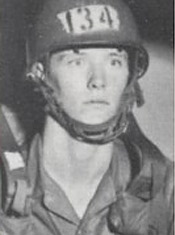
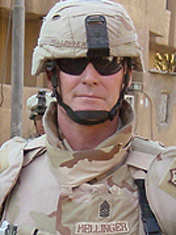
Jeff Mellinger (left in 1972 and right in 2005) was the last active duty enlisted draftee in the U.S. Army before retiring in 2011

During the 1968 presidential election, Richard Nixon campaigned on a promise to end the draft. He had become interested in the idea of an all-volunteer army during his time out of office, based upon a paper by Martin Anderson of Columbia University, and in part due to the efforts of ardent anti-draft activist-economist and Nobel laureate, Milton Friedman. Friedman has been quoted in interviews as stating:

In the realm of policy, I regard eliminating the draft as my most important accomplishment.

Nixon also saw ending the draft as an effective way to undermine the anti-Vietnam War movement since he believed affluent youths would stop protesting the war once their own probability of having to fight in it was gone. There was opposition to the all-volunteer notion from both Congress and the Department of Defense, so Nixon did not take immediate action toward ending the draft early in his presidency.

Instead, the Gates Commission was formed, headed by Thomas S. Gates, Jr., a former Secretary of Defense in the Eisenhower administration. Gates initially opposed the all-volunteer army idea but changed his mind during the course of the 15-member commission's work. The Gates Commission issued its report in February 1970, describing how adequate military strength could be maintained without having conscription. The existing draft law was expiring at the end of June 1971, but the Department of Defense and Nixon administration decided the draft needed to continue for at least some time. In February 1971, the administration requested Congress to extend the draft for two years, to June 1973.

Senatorial opponents of the war wanted to reduce this to a one-year extension, eliminate the draft altogether, or tie the draft renewal to a timetable for troop withdrawal from Vietnam; Senator Mike Gravel of Alaska took the most forceful approach, trying to filibuster the draft renewal legislation, shut conscription down, and directly force an end to the war. Senators supporting Nixon's war efforts supported the bill even though some had qualms about ending the draft. After a prolonged battle in the Senate, a September 1971 cloture was achieved over the filibuster, and the draft renewal bill was approved. Meanwhile, military pay was increased as an incentive to attract volunteers, and television advertising for the U.S. Army began. With the end of active U.S. ground participation in Vietnam, the last draft call was issued on December 7, 1972, applying to men born in 1952 and earlier.

On February 2, 1972, a drawing was held to determine draft priority numbers for men born in 1953, but in January 1973, Secretary of Defense Melvin Laird announced that no further draft orders would be issued. In March 1973, 1974, and 1975, the Selective Service assigned draft priority numbers for all men born in 1954, 1955, and 1956 in case the draft was extended, but it never was.

Command Sergeant Major Jeff Mellinger, believed to be the last drafted enlisted ranked soldier still on active duty, retired in 2011. Chief Warrant Officer 5 Ralph E. Rigby, the last Vietnam War-era drafted soldier of Warrant Officer rank, retired from the army on November 10, 2014, after a 42-year career.

December 28, 1972, had been scheduled to be the last day that draftees would be inducted that year. However, President Nixon declared that day a national day of mourning due to the death of former President Truman, and Federal offices were closed. Men scheduled to report that day were never inducted since the draft was not resumed in 1973.

=== Post-1980 draft registration ===
On July 2, 1980, President Jimmy Carter issued Presidential Proclamation 4771 and reinstated the requirement that young men register with the Selective Service System. At that time, it was required that all males, born on or after January 1, 1960, register with the Selective Service System. Those who were now in this category were male U.S. citizens and male immigrant non-citizens between the ages of 18 and 25; they were required to register within 30 days of their 18th birthday even if they were not actually eligible to join the military.

The Selective Service System, still essentially what it was in 1980, describes its mission as "to serve the emergency manpower needs of the Military by conscripting untrained manpower, or personnel with professional healthcare skills, if directed by Congress and the President in a national crisis." Registration is possible online or by mail. Registration forms are available at U.S. Post Offices.

The Selective Service registration form states that failure to register is a felony punishable by up to five years imprisonment or a $250,000 fine. In practice, though, no one has been prosecuted for failure to comply with draft registration since 1986, in part because prosecutions of draft resisters in the 1980s proved counter-productive for the government, and in part because of the difficulty of proving that noncompliance with the law was "knowing and willful".

In interviews published in U.S. News & World Report in May 2016, current and former Selective Service System officials said that in 1988, the Department of Justice and Selective Service agreed to suspend any further prosecutions of nonregistrants. Many men do not register at all, register late, or change addresses without notifying the Selective Service System.

Even in the absence of prosecution, however, failure to register may lead to other consequences. Registration is a requirement for employment by the federal government and some state governments, as well as for receiving various state benefits such as driver's licenses. Some collateral sanctions formerly in effect have been repealed: "From 1982 to 2021, males were required to register with Selective Service System to receive Title IV Federal student aid.... This requirement was eliminated by the FY 2021 Consolidated Appropriations Act.... [F]ailing to register with Selective Service System no longer impacts students' eligibility for Title IV student aid. Effective July 1, 2022, applicants will no longer be able to register with Selective Service System via the FAFSA."

An "automatic" registration provision was included and enacted in Section 535 of the NDAA for fiscal year 2026. Beginning on December 18, 2026, the Selective Service System will be required to identify, locate, and register all male (as assigned at birth) U.S. residents 18 to 26 years old on the basis of other existing federal databases. Men will no longer be required to register themselves or be subject to penalties for failing to do so. This was noted to be the most significant change to Selective Service since the self-registration system began in 1980.

Regulations implementing and establishing procedures for "automatic" registration, including notices required for data collection, data matching, and data use, will be issued by the Selective Service System in 2026.

== Healthcare personnel ==
In 1951, the Centers for Disease Control and Prevention created the Epidemic Intelligence Service (EIS), a two-year program to train doctors, veterinarians, statisticians, and other health workers in epidemiology. Eligible health workers drafted into general military service during the Korean and Vietnam Wars could instead enlist in the EIS to guard against potential biological warfare.

On December 1, 1989, Congress ordered the Selective Service System to put in place a system capable of drafting "persons qualified for practice or employment in a health care and professional occupation", if such a special-skills draft should be ordered by Congress. In response, Selective Service published plans for the "Health Care Personnel Delivery System" (HCPDS) in 1989 and has had them ready ever since. The concept underwent a preliminary field exercise in Fiscal Year 1998, followed by a more extensive nationwide readiness exercise in Fiscal Year 1999. The HCPDS plans include women and men ages 20–54 in 57 different job categories. As of May 2003, the Defense Department has said the most likely form of draft is a special skills draft, probably of health care workers.

== Legality ==
In 1918, the Supreme Court ruled that the World War I draft did not violate the United States Constitution in the Selective Draft Law Cases. The Court summarized the history of conscription in England and in colonial United States, a history that it read as establishing that the Framers envisioned compulsory military service as a governmental power. It held that the Constitution's grant to Congress of the powers to declare war and to raise and support armies included the power to mandate conscription. It rejected arguments based on states' rights, the 13th Amendment, and other provisions of the Constitution.

Later, during the Vietnam War, a lower appellate court also concluded that the draft was constitutional. United States v. Holmes, 387 F.2d 781 (7th Cir.), cert. denied, 391 U.S. 936 (1968). Justice William O. Douglas, in voting to hear the appeal in Holmes, agreed that the government had the authority to employ conscription in wartime, but argued that the constitutionality of a draft in the absence of a declaration of war was an open question, which the Supreme Court should address.

During the World War I era, the Supreme Court allowed the government great latitude in suppressing criticism of the draft. Examples include Schenck v. United States, 249 U.S. 47 (1919) and Gilbert v. Minnesota, 254 U.S. 325 (1920). In subsequent decades, however, the Court has taken a much broader view of the extent to which advocacy speech is protected by the First Amendment. Thus, in 1971 the Court held it unconstitutional for a state to punish a man who entered a county courthouse wearing a jacket with the words "Fuck the Draft" visible on it. Cohen v. California, 403 U.S. 15 (1971). Nevertheless, protesting the draft by the specific means of burning a draft registration card can be constitutionally prohibited, because of the government's interest in prohibiting the "nonspeech" element involved in destroying the card. United States v. O'Brien, 391 U.S. 367 (1968).

Since the reinstatement of draft registration in 1980, the Supreme Court has heard and decided four cases related to the Military Selective Service Act: Rostker v. Goldberg, 453 U.S. 57 (1981), upholding the Constitutionality of requiring men but not women to register for the draft; Selective Service v. Minnesota Public Interest Research Group (MPIRG), 468 U.S. 841 (1984), upholding the Constitutionality of the first of the federal "Solomon Amendment" laws, which requires applicants for Federal student aid to certify that they have complied with draft registration, either by having registered or by not being required to register; Wayte v. United States, 470 U.S. 598 (1985), upholding the policies and procedures which the Supreme Court thought the government had used to select the "most vocal" nonregistrants for prosecution, after the government refused to comply with discovery orders by the trial court to produce documents and witnesses related to the selection of nonregistrants for prosecution; and Elgin v. Department of the Treasury, 567 U.S. 1 (2012), regarding procedures for judicial review of denial of Federal employment for nonregistrants.

In 1981, several men filed lawsuit in the case Rostker v. Goldberg, alleging that the Military Selective Service Act violates the Due Process Clause of the Fifth Amendment by requiring that men only and not also women register with the Selective Service System. The Supreme Court upheld the act, stating that Congress's "decision to exempt women was not the accidental byproduct of a traditional way of thinking about women", that "since women are excluded from combat service by statute or military policy, men and women are simply not similarly situated for purposes of a draft or registration for a draft, and Congress' decision to authorize the registration of only men therefore does not violate the Due Process Clause", and that "the argument for registering women was based on considerations of equity, but Congress was entitled, in the exercise of its constitutional powers, to focus on the question of military need, rather than 'equity.'"

The Rostker v. Goldberg opinion's dependence upon deference on decision of the executive to exclude women from combat has garnered renewed scrutiny since the Department of Defense announced its decision in January 2013 to do away with most of the federal policies that have kept women from serving in combat roles in ground war situations. Both the U.S. Navy and the U.S. Air Force had by then already opened up virtually all positions in sea and air combat to women. Lawsuits were filed challenging the continued constitutionality of requiring men but not women to register with the Selective Service system: National Coalition for Men v. Selective Service System (filed April 4, 2013, U.S. District Court for the Central District of California; dismissed by the District Court July 29, 2013 as not "ripe" for decision; appeal argued December 8, 2015 before the 9th Circuit Court of Appeals; reversed and remanded February 19, 2016), and Kyle v. Selective Service System (filed July 3, 2015, U.S. District Court for the District of New Jersey), brought on behalf of 17-year-old Elizabeth Kyle-LaBell by her mother, Allison. Elizabeth tried to register, but as a female, was not eligible.

=== National Coalition for Men v. Selective Service System ===
In February 2019, the United States District Court for the Southern District of Texas ruled that male-only conscription registration breached the Fourteenth Amendment's equal protection clause, overturning the previous ruling on the grounds that the policies of the armed forces regarding women had changed significantly, such that they can now be used interchangeably with men. In a case brought by non-profit men's rights organisation the National Coalition for Men against the U.S. Selective Service System, judge Gray H. Miller issued a declaratory judgement that the male-only registration requirement is unconstitutional, though did not specify what action the government should take. That decision was reversed by the 5th Circuit Court of Appeals. A petition for review was then filed with the U.S. Supreme Court. In June 2021, the U.S. Supreme Court declined to review the decision by the Court of Appeals due to the fact that Congress was actively investigating removing the male-only requirement.

== Conscientious objection ==
According to the Selective Service System,

A conscientious objector is one who is opposed to serving in the armed forces and/or bearing arms on the grounds of moral or religious principles. ...

Beliefs which qualify a registrant for CO status may be religious in nature, but don't have to be. Beliefs may be moral or ethical; however, a man's reasons for not wanting to participate in a war must not be based on politics, expediency, or self-interest. In general, the man's lifestyle prior to making his claim must reflect his current claims.

The Supreme Court has ruled in cases United States v. Seeger (1965) and Welsh v. United States (1970) that conscientious objection can be by non-religious beliefs as well as religious beliefs; but it has also ruled in Gillette v. United States (1971) against objections to specific wars as grounds for conscientious objection.

There is currently no mechanism to indicate that one is a conscientious objector in the Selective Service system. According to the SSS, after a person is drafted, he can claim conscientious objector status and then justify it before the Local Board. This is criticized because during the times of a draft, when the country is in emergency conditions, there could be increased pressure for Local Boards to be more harsh on conscientious objector claims.

There are two types of status for conscientious objectors. If a person objects only to combat but not to service in the military, then the person could be given noncombatant service in the military without training of weapons. If the person objects to all military service, then the person could be ordered to "alternative service" with a job "deemed to make a meaningful contribution to the maintenance of the national health, safety, and interest".

== Selective Service reforms ==
The Selective Service System has maintained that they have implemented several reforms that would make the draft more fair and equitable.

Some of the measures they have implemented include:

- Before and during the Vietnam War, a young man could get a deferment by showing that he was a full-time student making satisfactory progress toward a degree; now deferment only lasts to the end of the semester. If the man is a senior he can defer until the end of the academic year.
- The government has said that draft boards are now more representative of the local communities in areas such as race and national origin.
- A lottery system would be used to determine the order of people being called up. Previously the oldest men who were found eligible for the draft would be taken first. In the new system, the men called first would be those who are or will turn 20 years old in the calendar year or those whose deferments will end in the calendar year. Following this, men above 20 years will be called in sequence up until their liability ends; eligible men below the 20-year cutoff (i.e. 18 and 19-year-olds) will then be called afterwards, being lowest priority.

== Conscription controversies and proposals since 2003 ==
The effort to enforce Selective Service registration law was abandoned in 1986. Since then, no attempt to reinstate conscription has been able to attract much support in the legislature or among the public. Since early 2003, when the Iraq War appeared imminent, there had been attempts through legislation and campaign rhetoric to begin a new public conversation on the topic. Public opinion since 1981 has been largely negative.

In 2003, several Democratic congressmen (Charles Rangel of New York, Jim McDermott of Washington, John Conyers of Michigan, John Lewis of Georgia, Pete Stark of California, Neil Abercrombie of Hawaii) introduced legislation that would draft both men and women into either military or civilian government service, should there be a draft in the future. The bill was defeated on October 5, 2004, with two members voting for it and 402 members voting against. Of those who introduced the bill, only Stark voted in support.

Despite arguments by defense leaders that they had no interest in re-instituting the draft, Representative Neil Abercrombie's (D-HI) inclusion of a DOD memo in the Congressional Record which detailed a meeting by senior leaders signaled renewed interest. Though the conclusion of the meeting memo did not call for a reinstatement of the draft, it did suggest Selective Service Act modifications to include registration by women and self-reporting of critical skills that could serve to meet military, homeland-defense, and humanitarian needs. This hinted at more targeted draft options being considered, perhaps like that of the "Doctor Draft" that began in the 1950s to provide nearly 66% of the medical professionals who served in the Army in Korea. Once created, this manpower tool continued to be used through 1972. The meeting memo gave DOD's primary reason for opposing a draft as a matter of cost effectiveness and efficiency. Draftees with less than two years' retention were said to be a net drain on military resources providing insufficient benefit to offset overhead costs of using them.

Mentions of the draft during the presidential campaign led to a resurgence of anti-draft and draft resistance organizing. One poll of young voters in October 2004 found that 29% would resist if drafted.

In November 2006, Representative Charles B. Rangel (D-NY) again called for the draft to be reinstated; Speaker of the House Nancy Pelosi rejected the proposal.

On December 19, 2006, President George W. Bush announced that he was considering sending more troops to Iraq. The next day, the Selective Service System's director for operations and chief information officer, Scott Campbell, announced plans for a "readiness exercise" to test the system's operations in 2006, for the first time since 1998.

On December 21, 2006, Veterans Affairs secretary Jim Nicholson, when asked by a reporter whether the draft should be reinstated to make the military more equal, said, "I think that our society would benefit from that, yes sir." Nicholson proceeded to relate his experience as a company commander in an infantry unit which brought together soldiers of different socioeconomic backgrounds and education levels, noting that the draft "does bring people from all quarters of our society together in the common purpose of serving". Nicholson later issued a statement saying he does not support reinstating the draft.

On August 10, 2007, with National Public Radio on "All Things Considered", Lieutenant General Douglas Lute, National Security Adviser to the President and Congress for all matters pertaining to the United States military efforts in Iraq and Afghanistan, expressed support for a draft to alleviate the stress on the Army's all-volunteer force. He cited the fact that repeated deployments place much strain upon one soldier's family and himself which, in turn, can affect retention.

A similar bill to Rangel's 2003 one was introduced in 2007, called the Universal National Service Act of 2007 (H.R. 393), but it did not receive a hearing or be scheduled for consideration.

At the end of June 2014 in Pennsylvania, 14,250 letters were erroneously posted to men born in the 19th century calling upon them to register with the Selective Service. This was attributed to a clerk at the Pennsylvania Department of Transportation who failed to select a century during a transfer of 400,000 records to the Selective Service; as a result, the system did not differentiate between men born in 1993 (who would need to register) and those born in 1893 (who would almost certainly be dead). This was compared to the "Year 2000 problem" ("Y2K bug"), in which computer programs that represented years using two digits instead of four digits were expected to have problems beginning in the year 2000. The Selective Service identified 27,218 records of men born in the 19th century made errantly applicable by the change of century and began sending out notices to them on June 30.

On June 14, 2016, the Senate voted to require women to register for the draft, though language requiring this was dropped from later versions of the bill.

In 2020, the bipartisan National Commission on Military, National, and Public Service issued a final report recommending that the military improve enlistment rates through improved outreach and recruiting rather than a renewed draft. However, it also recommended that the U.S. Department of Defense perform regular national mobilization drills to rehearse a recommencement of the draft.

In 2020 and 2021, bills were introduced in Congress either to repeal the Military Selective Service Act or, alternatively, to replace all references to "male" in that act with non-gendered language. Either of these proposals, if enacted, would remove any gender and sex conditionality related to the draft. Neither proposal was enacted.

In 2024, an amendment to the National Defense Authorization Act for Fiscal Year 2025 was proposed that males "between the ages of eighteen and twenty-six, shall be automatically registered" with Selective Service. If enacted, the amendment would enable an attempt to identify, locate, and register potential draftees "automatically" using data from other federal databases. Other proposed amendments to the 2025 NDAA included exempting any potential conscripted females from combat assignments during a future draft, removing the registration requirement for federal employees, and requiring Senate confirmation of the Selective Service System Director. None of these proposed amendments were included in the final 2025 NDAA version, aside from an amendment allowing for federal employment of veterans that did not register with Selective Service that provide proof of military service and an amendment "to update the types of information that the Department of Defense may obtain from the Selective Service System" to include "full names, email addresses, dates of birth, phone numbers, and mailing addresses furnished."

The proposal for "automatic" registration was reintroduced in 2025, and enacted into law in December 2025 as part of the NDAA for Fiscal Year 2026 (Public Law 119-60, Section 535).

In March 2026, White House Press Secretary Karoline Leavitt indicated that the Trump administration will not rule out a military draft for the 2026 Iran war. While doing so, she clarified that a draft is not "part of the current plan," but that the president is open to all ideas.

== Non-citizens ==
The Selective Service (and the draft) in the United States is not limited to citizens. Howard Stringer, for example, was drafted six weeks after arriving from his native Britain in 1965. Today, non-citizen males of appropriate age in the United States, who are permanent residents (holders of green cards), seasonal agricultural workers not holding an H-2A Visa, refugees, parolees, asylees, and illegal immigrants, are required to register with the Selective Service System. Refusal to do so is grounds for denial of a future citizenship application. In addition, immigrants who seek to naturalize as citizens must, as part of the Oath of Citizenship, recite the following:

... that I will bear arms on behalf of the United States when required by the law; that I will perform noncombatant service in the armed forces of the United States when required by the law; that I will perform work of national importance under civilian direction when required by the law;

The United States Citizenship and Immigration Services (USCIS) also allows the recital of a "Modified Oath for Religious or Conscientious Objections" with either or both of the clauses "that I will bear arms on behalf of the United States when required by law; that I will perform noncombatant service in the armed forces of the United States when required by law" deleted.

== Statistics ==
=== Selective Service System ===
Numbers reflect the year draftees entered military service.

Conflict	Dates active	Number of wartime draftees
World War I	September 1917 – November 1918	2,810,296
World War II	November 1940 – October 1946	10,110,104
Korean War	June 1950 – June 1953	1,529,539
Vietnam War	August 1964 – February 1973	1,857,304

Year	Total draftees
1917	516,212
1918	2,294,084
1940	18,633
1941	923,842
1942	3,033,361
1943	3,323,970
1944	1,591,942
1945	945,862
1946	183,383
1947	0
1948	20,348
1949	9,781
1950	219,771
1951	551,806
1952	438,479
1953	473,806
1954	253,230
1955	152,777
1956	137,940
1957	138,504
1958	142,246
1959	96,143
1960	86,602
1961	118,586
1962	82,060
1963	119,265
1964	112,386
1965	230,991
1966	382,010
1967	228,263
1968	296,406
1969	283,586
1970	162,746
1971	94,092
1972	49,514
1973	646

== See also ==
- American Indians in World War I
- Conscription crisis
- Demobilization of United States armed forces after World War II
- Milton Friedman
- National service
- Peace churches
- Selective Service System

== References and further reading ==
- Martin Anderson; Valerie Bloom (1976). Conscription: a select and annotated bibliography. Hoover Press. ISBN 978-0-8179-2571-0.. (Full text).
- Leach, Jack F. Conscription in the United States: Historical Background. (Rutland, Vt., 1952)

=== American Revolution ===
- Dougherty, Keith L. Collective Action under the Articles of Confederation. Cambridge U. Press, 2001. 211 pp.

=== Civil War ===
- Anbinder, Tyler (December 2006). "Which Poor Man's Fight? Immigrants and the Federal Conscription of 1863". Civil War History. 52 (4): 344–372. doi:10.1353/CWH.2006.0068. S2CID 143629700.
- Bernstein, Iver (1990). The New York City Draft Riots: Their Significance for American Society and Politics in the Age of the Civil War. Archived from the original on January 10, 2006 – via Questia.
- Cruz, Barbara C. and Jennifer Marques Patterson. "'In the Midst of Strange and Terrible Times': The New York City Draft Riots of 1863." Social Education. v. 69#1 2005. pp. 10+, with teacher's guide and URL's. online version
- Geary, James W. We Need Men: The Union Draft in the Civil War (1991) pp. 264
- Geary, James W. "Civil War Conscription in the North: A Historiographical Review," Civil War History 32 (1986): 208–228, online
- Hilderman, Walter C., III. They Went into the Fight Cheering! Confederate Conscription in North Carolina. Boone, N.C.: Parkway, 2005. pp. 272
- Hyman, Harold M. A More Perfect Union: The Impact of the Civil War and Reconstruction on the Constitution. (1973), ch 13. online edition
- Kenny, Kevin (2013). "Abraham Lincoln and the American Irish". American Journal of Irish Studies. 10: 39–64. JSTOR 23595037.
- Levine, Peter (March 1981). "Draft Evasion in the North during the Civil War, 1863–1865". The Journal of American History. 67 (4): 816–834. doi:10.2307/1888051. JSTOR 1888051.
- Man, Albon P. Jr. (1951). "Labor competition and the New York draft riots of 1863". Journal of Negro History. 36 (4): 375–405. doi:10.2307/2715371. JSTOR 2715371.: On Black role
- Moore, Albert Burton (1924). Conscription and Conflict in the Confederacy. Archived from the original on December 6, 2005 – via Questia.
- Murdoch, Eugene C. One Million Men: The Civil War Draft in the North (1971).
- Perri, Timothy J. "The Economics of US Civil War Conscription." American Law and Economics Review 10#2 (2008), pp. 424–53. online
- Shankman, Arnold (April 1977). "Draft Resistance in Civil War Pennsylvania". The Pennsylvania Magazine of History and Biography. 101 (2): 190–204. JSTOR 20091147.
- Wheeler, Kenneth H. "Local Autonomy and Civil War Draft Resistance: Holmes County, Ohio." Civil War History. v.45#2 1999. pp. 147+ online edition

=== World War I ===
- Chambers II, John Whiteclay. To Raise an Army: The Draft Comes to Modern America (1987), comprehensive look at the national level.
- Ford, Nancy Gentile (2001). Americans All!: Foreign-born Soldiers in World War I. Texas A&M University Military History Series:73. ISBN 978-1-60344-132-2.
- Ford, Nancy Gentile. "'Mindful of the Traditions of His Race': Dual Identity and Foreign-born Soldiers in the First World War American Army." Journal of American Ethnic History 1997 16(2): 35–57. ISSN 0278-5927 Fulltext: in Ebsco
- Hickle, K. Walter (2000). "'Justice and the Highest Kind of Equality Require Discrimination': Citizenship, Dependency, and Conscription in the South, 1917–1919". Journal of Southern History. 66 (4): 749+. Archived from the original on January 10, 2006 – via Questia.
- Keith, Jeanette. "The Politics of Southern Draft Resistance, 1917–1918: Class, Race, and Conscription in the Rural South." Journal of American History 2000 87(4): 1335–1361. ISSN 0021-8723 Fulltext: in Jstor and Ebsco
- Keith, Jeanette. Rich Man's War, Poor Man's Fight: Race, Class, and Power in the Rural South during the First World War. 2004. 260pp.
- Kennedy, David M. (1980). Over Here: The First World War and American Society – via Questia.
- Shenk, Gerald E. "Race, Manhood, and Manpower: Mobilizing Rural Georgia for World War I," Georgia Historical Quarterly, 81 (Fall 1997), 622–662
- Woodward, C. Vann. Tom Watson, Agrarian Rebel (1938), pp. 451–463.
- Sieger, Susan (1996). "She Didn't Raise Her Boy to Be a Slacker: Motherhood, Conscription, and the Culture of the First World War". Feminist Studies. 22 (1): 7+. Archived from the original on December 8, 2007 – via Questia.
- Shenk, Gerald E. (2005). "Work or fight!": Race, Gender, and the Draft in World War One. Macmillan Publishers. ISBN 978-1-4039-6175-4.

=== World War II ===
- Flynn, George Q. The Draft, 1940–1973. Lawrence: University Press of Kansas, 1993; the standard history
- Garry, Clifford J. and Samuel R. Spencer Jr. The First Peacetime Draft. 1986.
- Goossen, Rachel Waltner; Women against the Good War: Conscientious Objection and Gender on the American Home Front, 1941–1947 1997 online edition
- Westbrook, Robert. "'I Want a Girl Just Like the Girl That Married Harry James': American Women and the Problem of Political Obligation in WWII," American Quarterly 42 (December 1990): 587–614; online in JSTOR

=== Cold War and Vietnam ===
- Lawrence M. Baskir; William A. Strauss (1978). Chance and Circumstance: The Draft, the War, and the Vietnam Generation. Random House. ISBN 978-0-394-72749-3.
- Flynn, George Q. The Draft, 1940–1973. Lawrence: University Press of Kansas, 1993; the standard history
- Marc Leepson, "What It Was Like to Be Drafted," The New York Times, "Vietnam '67," July 21, 2017.

=== Recent ===
- Halstead, Fred. GIs Speak out against the War: The Case of the Ft. Jackson 8. 128 pages. New York: Pathfinder Press. 1970.
- Warner, John T. and Beth J. Asch. "The Record and Prospects of the All-volunteer Military in the United States." Journal of Economic Perspectives 2001 15(2): 169–192. ISSN 0895-3309 Fulltext: in Jstor and Ebsco
- Wooten; Evan M. "Banging on the Backdoor Draft: The Constitutional Validity of Stop-Loss in the Military", William and Mary Law Review, Vol. 47, 2005
- Chambers II, John Whiteclay, ed. Draftees or Volunteers: A Documentary History of the Debate over Military Conscription in the United States, 1787–1973, (1975) (1976) (2011)
