= Daniel Anderl Judicial Security and Privacy Act =

2022 United States federal law

Daniel Anderl Judicial Security and Privacy Act of 2022
- Enacted by: the 117th United States Congress

Citations
- Public law: Pub. L. 117–263 (text) (PDF), Division E, Title LIX, Subtitle D
- Statutes at Large: 136 Stat. 3458

Legislative history
- Signed into law by President Joe Biden on December 23, 2022

The Daniel Anderl Judicial Security and Privacy Act of 2022 is a United States federal law that protects the personal information of federal judges and their immediate families by restricting its sale and disclosure. It was enacted on December 23, 2022, as part of the National Defense Authorization Act for Fiscal Year 2023. The law is named for Daniel Anderl, the son of U.S. District Judge Esther Salas, who was killed in an attack at the family's home in 2020.

== Background ==
On July 19, 2020, lawyer Roy Den Hollander, who had a case before Salas, attacked her family at their home in New Jersey while posing as a delivery driver. He killed her 20-year-old son, Daniel, and wounded her husband, Mark Anderl. Salas was elsewhere in the house and was not injured. Following the attack, she called for restrictions on access to judges' personal information.

New Jersey enacted a separate statute, known as "Daniel's Law", in 2020 to protect personal information about judges and other public officials.

== Legislative history ==
Senator Bob Menendez announced the federal legislation in September 2020, with support from Senator Cory Booker, Representative Mikie Sherrill and Senator Lindsey Graham. A subsequent version advanced through the Senate Judiciary Committee in December 2021. In May 2022, Senator Rand Paul blocked an attempt to pass the bill by unanimous consent, arguing that its protections should also cover members of Congress. Menendez opposed adding those provisions, saying that doing so could impede passage.

Congress incorporated the measure into the defense authorization bill for fiscal year 2023. The Senate approved that bill on December 15, 2022, by a vote of 83–11, following House approval. President Joe Biden signed the legislation on December 23. The act comprises sections 5931–5939 of Public Law 117–263.

== Provisions ==
The act restricts the sale of judges' personal information by data brokers and provides for its removal from federal government websites. It also allows judges to request that other businesses and individuals remove personal information published online, subject to exceptions for news reporting and matters of public interest. Protected information includes home addresses, telephone numbers and Social Security numbers of judges and their immediate families.

== Reception ==
The Judicial Conference of the United States supported the legislation. Salas and Roslynn R. Mauskopf, director of the Administrative Office of the United States Courts, argued that protecting judges and their families from threats was necessary to preserve judicial independence.

Court watchdog groups, including Fix the Court and the Free Law Project, raised concerns about the bill's breadth and its implications for transparency and the First Amendment. In October 2022, the Reporters Committee for Freedom of the Press argued that the proposed restrictions could hinder reporting on judicial conflicts of interest. It said that exemptions for news reporting might offer insufficient protection if the underlying information became unavailable to journalists.
