= Roy Den Hollander =

American lawyer and men's rights activist (1947–2020)

- Born: Roy Den Hollander; September 26, 1947; Midland Park, New Jersey
- Died: July 20, 2020 (aged 72); Rockland, New York, U.S
- Cause of death: Suicide by gunshot
- Education: George Washington University (JD); Columbia University (MBA)
- Occupations: Attorney, men's rights activist
- Spouse: Alina Shipilina (m. 2000; div. 2001)

Roy Den Hollander (September 26, 1947 – July 20, 2020) was an American lawyer who gained notoriety as a suspected murderer after acting as an attorney in several unsuccessful sex discrimination suits on behalf of men. He had also worked as a private investigator in Russia.

Den Hollander, who had earlier stated he was "dying from cancer", was found dead on July 20, 2020, outside a rental car from an apparent self-inflicted gunshot wound, which contributed to him being made a suspect in the July 2020 murder of lawyer Marc Angelucci in eastern California and, eight days later, an attack on the family of U.S. District Judge Esther Salas in New Jersey, in which Salas's son Daniel Anderl was killed and Salas's husband, Mark Anderl, was seriously wounded.

== Life and career ==
Den Hollander was born in 1947 and grew up in Midland Park, New Jersey. He graduated from Midland Park High School in 1965, as one of the 234 students in the school's largest graduating class to that time.

Den Hollander graduated from the George Washington University Law School in 1985 and earned an MBA from the Columbia Business School in 1997. He worked as an attorney in the Office of Chief Counsel of the Internal Revenue Service: Interpretative Division, and as an associate in the late 1980s with Cravath, Swaine & Moore, a white shoe law firm in New York City.

He also worked as a private investigator for Kroll Associates in Russia. In 1993, he gave a speech at the Kremlin. In March 2000, he married Angelina Shipilina, a Russian model he had met while living in Russia, but the two separated nine months later. He would later accuse his former wife of having ties to Russian organized crime.

He was also a men's rights activist and self-described antifeminist who had previously been known for filing unsuccessful lawsuits against "ladies night" promotions at bars and nightclubs, as well as suing Columbia University for offering women's studies classes. His string of unsuccessful lawsuits earned him an appearance on The Colbert Report. On August 20, 2008, he was an on-air guest of Fox News' Neil Cavuto.

In 2015, he represented the plaintiffs of a gender-equity lawsuit in the United States District Court for the District of New Jersey challenging the constitutionality of the military's male-only draft. The lawsuit went before Judge Esther Salas, who sided against some of Den Hollander's arguments but allowed the case to proceed in court. He reportedly believed Salas was deliberately stalling the lawsuit for political reasons.

In September 2016, documents were uploaded to Den Hollander's website with contact info for Russian lawyers who should be contacted "if something happens to me".

In June 2019, he handed the draft case to a team of fellow lawyers, citing a terminal illness diagnosis that he later revealed to be melanoma. In January 2020, he informed reporters that he was "painfully dying from metastasized cancer".

== Writings and political beliefs ==
Den Hollander has been described as a men's rights activist by various sources, and had been a part of the National Coalition for Men, before being kicked out, although he has himself denounced the movement, calling them "wimps and whiners".

In various online writings running to thousands of pages, Den Hollander denounced women and specifically female judges. In 2,028 pages posted online in 2019, he espoused "sexist, racist, and misogynistic" views, and in one such document, disparaged Salas directly. In another document, which outlined possible "solutions" to feminists and "political commies", he wrote, "Things begin to change when individual men start taking out those specific persons responsible for destroying their lives before committing suicide."

He said that he was a volunteer for Donald Trump's presidential campaign, and denounced President Barack Obama, Supreme Court Justice Sonia Sotomayor, and Hillary Clinton.

== Murder suspect ==
=== Murder of Marc Angelucci ===
On July 11, 2020, lawyer and National Coalition for Men (NCFM) leader Marc Angelucci was fatally shot at his front door in Cedarpines Park, California, an unincorporated community near San Bernardino, California. A man rang the doorbell and when someone else from the house opened the door, the unknown assailant said that there was a package delivery for Angelucci. After he came to the door to sign for the package Angelucci was shot, after which the shooter sped away in an as yet undetermined vehicle. Angelucci was pronounced dead on the scene after paramedics arrived.

The FBI is investigating the murder and possible links to the shooting of district judge Esther Salas's son and husband in New Jersey which occurred eight days later. In both attacks, the murderer posed as a package deliveryman. According to the president of the NCFM, Harry Crouch, and men's rights activist Paul Elam, Den Hollander had been kicked out of the organization after he became enraged that he was not named as a co-counselor in National Coalition for Men v. Selective Service System, a lawsuit filed in 2013. Papers mentioning Angelucci had been found in the car where Den Hollander had killed himself. Den Hollander viewed Angelucci as a rival and reportedly bore a grudge against him.

=== Attack on Salas family ===
On July 19, 2020, the family of US District Court Judge Esther Salas was attacked at their home, killing Salas's son Daniel, aged 20, and leaving her husband Mark in a critical but stable condition from multiple gunshot wounds. Salas was in the basement at the time of the attack and was not injured. The Federal Bureau of Investigation (FBI) is leading the investigation in conjunction with the U.S. Marshals Service and local law enforcement, and Den Hollander has been named a suspect. Investigators believe a person dressed as a FedEx employee was in the neighborhood at the time of the attack, but they could not determine whether the person in uniform was the assailant.

== Death ==
The day after the attack on Salas's family, Den Hollander was found dead from a self-inflicted gunshot wound in Rockland, near Liberty in Sullivan County, New York. A list of judges, doctors, and other targets was found in a rental car chartered by Den Hollander on the road where his body was found. The list included Judge Salas, Mr. Angelucci and actor / comedian Jim Norton, who Hollander unsuccessfully tried to sue for slander after an interview on the Opie and Anthony Show as well as one oncologist who had treated Den Hollander. In an interview with 60 Minutes, Judge Salas claimed that Hollander had also targeted Supreme Court Justice Sonia Sotomayor. He had recently received a terminal cancer diagnosis.

Law enforcement officials told The New York Times that the Walther semiautomatic pistol Den Hollander used was "of the same caliber as the weapon used in both the California shooting and the New Jersey shooting."

Immediately after the discovery of Den Hollander's body, authorities identified him as the "primary subject" in the attack against Salas's family. Two days later, authorities linked Den Hollander to Angelucci's killing.
