= Marc Angelucci =

American lawyer and men's rights activist

- Angelucci in The Red Pill (2016)
- Born: March 30, 1968
- Died: July 11, 2020 (aged 52); Cedarpines Park, California, U.S.
- Cause of death: Gunshot wounds
- Education: UCLA School of Law (JD)
- Occupations: Attorney, men's rights activist, vice president of NCFM
- Organization: National Coalition for Men
- Movement: Men's rights movement

Marc Etienne Angelucci [andʒeˈluttʃi] (March 30, 1968 – July 11, 2020) was an American attorney, men's rights activist, and the vice-president of the National Coalition for Men (NCFM). As a lawyer, he represented several cases related to men's rights issues, and the most prominently, National Coalition for Men v. Selective Service System, in which the federal judge declared the male-only selective-service system unconstitutional. He was found murdered at his home on July 11, 2020.

== Biography ==
Marc Angelucci graduated from Eagle Rock High School in Los Angeles in 1986 and UCLA School of Law sometime before 2001. He stated that he joined the National Coalition for Men while he was in law school after his friend had suffered from domestic violence, but was denied aid or support in 1997. He was admitted to the State Bar of California in 2000. He founded the Los Angeles chapter of the NCFM in 2001.

A 2001 article in the Los Angeles Times described Angelucci as "a Green Party member with socialist sympathies". He had an autistic brother.

In 2008, he won the Woods v. Horton case in a California appellate court, which ruled that the California State Legislature had improperly excluded men from domestic violence victim protection programs.

=== National Coalition for Men v. Selective Service System ===
In 2013, Angelucci sued the Selective Service System on behalf of the NCFM on the basis that there is no reason to exclude women from the draft. Federal judge Gray H. Miller ruled that the male-only draft is unconstitutional in February 2019, stating that "historical restrictions on women in the military may have justified past discrimination" but that the rationale does not apply anymore as women serve in combat roles as well. In August 2020, the United States Court of Appeals for the Fifth Circuit upheld the constitutionality of the male-only draft, invoking stare decisis with respect to the earlier and precedential Supreme Court decision Rostker v. Goldberg.

Angelucci appeared in the 2016 documentary The Red Pill, which detailed the men's rights movement.

== Assassination ==
Angelucci was fatally shot at his front door in Cedarpines Park, California, on July 11, 2020. A man posing as a deliveryman rang the doorbell and, when someone else from the house opened the door, the assailant claimed to have a package for Angelucci. After Angelucci came to the door to sign for it, he was shot, and the shooter sped away in a car. Angelucci was pronounced dead at the scene after paramedics arrived.

=== Investigation ===
The FBI investigated the murder and its possible links to Roy Den Hollander, the suspect in the shooting of district judge Esther Salas' son and husband in New Jersey. In this later attack, eight days after the murder of Angelucci, the murderer had also posed as a package deliveryman. Den Hollander had, according to Harry Crouch, the president of the NCFM, been kicked out of the organization 5–6 years prior because Den Hollander was a "nut job". According to Crouch, Den Hollander had also been removed from the coalition board for threatening Crouch. Den Hollander had a vendetta against Esther Salas because he felt that she had taken too long to rule on his discrimination lawsuit, leading Angelucci to win in a similar case in Texas before Den Hollander's case could be decided, and thus costing Den Hollander a victorious precedent. Den Hollander was later found to have taken his life in his car, where papers mentioning Angelucci were also found.

== See also ==
- List of unsolved murders (2000–present)
