= Esther Salas =

American judge (born 1968)

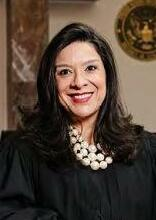

Judge of the United States District Court for the District of New Jersey
- Incumbent
- Assumed office June 14, 2011
- Appointed by: Barack Obama
- Preceded by: Katharine Sweeney Hayden

Personal details
- Born: 1968 (age 57–58) Monterey Park, California, U.S.
- Spouse: Mark Anderl (m. 1993)
- Children: 1 (Note: Deceased)
- Education: Rutgers University, New Brunswick (BA); Rutgers University, Newark (JD)

Esther Salas (born 1968) is a United States district judge of the United States District Court for the District of New Jersey sitting in Newark, New Jersey. She previously served as a United States magistrate judge of the same court from 2006 until her confirmation as a district judge in 2011. Salas is the first Hispanic woman to serve as a United States magistrate judge and as a United States District Judge in the District of New Jersey.

== Early life ==
Salas is from Monterey Park, California, and is the daughter of a Cuban mother and a Mexican father. Her father is Jewish and her mother is Roman Catholic. At the age of five, she, her mother, Aurelia Salas, along with her siblings, moved to Union City, New Jersey. Though she lost contact with her father when she moved from the West Coast, she would later reconnect with him during the course of the background check she underwent upon being appointed a federal judge. In 1978, her mother's home burned down. Growing up indigent, Salas recalls having to translate for her divorced mother at the welfare office, and later helping friends with various problems facing their lives, an activity that led to her pursuit of a career focusing on human services.

Salas attended Emerson High School in Union City, where her extracurricular activities included cheerleading. After graduating from high school in 1987, she attended Rutgers University–New Brunswick, where she lived on campus and was active in clubs and activities. Salas graduated from Rutgers in 1991 and in 1994 from Rutgers University School of Law in Newark with a Juris Doctor. She credits her success during her education and during her later professional life to the Minority Student Program.

== Career ==
Following law school graduation, Salas served as a law clerk to Eugene J. Codey Jr., of the Superior Court of New Jersey. From 1995 to 1997, Salas worked for Garces & Grabler, P.C., where she practiced criminal matters in superior and municipal courts. Between 1997 and 2006, she served as an Assistant Federal Public Defender for the District of New Jersey, representing indigent defendants in federal matters. Salas served as president of the Hispanic Bar Association of New Jersey from 2001 to 2002, and as president of the Hispanic Bar Foundation of New Jersey. She has also been a member of the Governor's Hispanic Advisory Committee for Policy Development, the Supreme Court Committee on Minority Concerns, and the Supreme Court Committee on Women in the Courts.

=== Federal judicial service ===
In 2006, Salas was selected from a group of 99 applicants as United States magistrate judge for the District of New Jersey, becoming the first Latina in that position, in which she served for five years. On August 31, 2010, Senators Frank Lautenberg and Robert Menendez announced they would recommend to President Barack Obama that Salas be nominated as a federal district judge on the same court. Obama nominated her on December 1, 2010, to a seat vacated by Katharine Sweeney Hayden who assumed senior status on May 30, 2010. The American Bar Association's Standing Committee on the Federal Judiciary, which rates the qualifications of federal judicial nominees, unanimously rated Salas "well qualified" for the judgeship (the committee's highest rating). The nomination expired without Senate action at the end of the 111th Congress. Obama renominated Salas on January 5, 2011, at the beginning of the 112th Congress, and the Senate confirmed her by voice vote on June 14, 2011 and she received her commission the same day, making her the first Latina on the District Court of New Jersey.

=== Notable cases ===
The U.S. District Court for the District of New Jersey has a busy docket; according to a 2018 profile, Salas "presides over as many as 485 civil matters and 50 criminal cases" at any given time.

- In 2013, Salas presided over a criminal case against the former chief information technology officer for the office of Dawn Zimmer, the mayor of Hoboken, New Jersey. The administrator pleaded guilty to hacking into Zimmer's email account to disclose her emails, and the emails of others, to other persons within Hoboken City Hall. Salas sentenced the man to five years' probation.
- Salas was the judge responsible for the trial of Real Housewives of New Jersey star Teresa Giudice and her husband, Giuseppe "Joe" Giudice. Both were sentenced for bank fraud on October 2, 2014.
- In 2018, Salas issued an order temporarily blocking U.S. Immigration and Customs Enforcement (ICE) from deporting certain Indonesian Christians in New Jersey who were present without authorization in the U.S. and were subject to orders of removal, but were seeking legal status. The order dealt with about 50 Christians who had fled persecution in Indonesia and had lived in New Jersey for many years before being targeted by immigration enforcement actions.
- In 2018, Salas sentenced Farad Roland, a leader of the Newark "South Side Cartel" set of the Bloods street gang, to 45 years in prison for his role in a series of crimes from 2003 to 2010, including five fatal shootings, a carjacking and drug dealing. The sentence accepted a plea agreement reached between the defendant and federal prosecutors. Salas had earlier ruled that Roland's intellectual disability made him ineligible to be sentenced to death under the Eighth Amendment to the United States Constitution, which prohibits cruel and unusual punishment, and under the Federal Death Penalty Act.
- Salas is the judge presiding over the class-action lawsuit against Deutsche Bank (Karimi v. Deutsche Bank Aktiengesellschaft et al.), which alleges that Deutsche Bank had poor financial reporting practices and made misleading statements to securities investors, resulting from Deutsche Bank's desire to obscure its anti-money laundering deficiencies and its poor monitoring of high-risk customers such as Jeffrey Epstein, Danske Bank in Estonia, and FBME Bank.

== Personal life ==
Salas is married to attorney Mark A. Anderl (born 1957) since 1993, with whom she had a son, Daniel Anderl (July 13, 2000 – July 19, 2020). She was a criminal defense attorney and former Essex County assistant prosecutor. Salas and her family are Catholic.

=== Home attack ===
On July 19, 2020, an assailant targeted Salas's family at their home. Daniel, aged 20, opened the door when the assailant knocked. The assailant then opened fire, killing Daniel at the scene. His father Mark was also shot multiple times and left in a critical but stable condition. Salas was in the basement at the time of the attack and was not injured. The Federal Bureau of Investigation led the investigation into the attack on Salas' family home in conjunction with the U.S. Marshals Service and local law enforcement.

The following day, the FBI identified 72-year-old attorney Roy Den Hollander as the primary suspect; Den Hollander was found dead from a self-inflicted gunshot wound in the town of Rockland in upstate New York. Den Hollander was a self-described antifeminist previously known for filing unsuccessful lawsuits against "ladies night" promotions at bars and nightclubs, as well as suing Columbia University for offering women's studies classes. Den Hollander had appeared before Salas in connection with a lawsuit he brought challenging the military's male-only draft. In various writings, Den Hollander ranted about his hatred of women, used racist and sexist terms to disparage Salas, and spoke of his personal grievances. Den Hollander described himself as a "men's rights" activist but was ejected from the National Coalition for Men and is also a suspect in the shooting death of a men's rights lawyer, Marc Angelucci, at his home in Crestline, California, earlier the same month.

Salas was interviewed for a 60 Minutes report in February 2021 about this attack, in which 60 Minutes also revealed the discovery of the gunman's planning for an attack on Justice Sonia Sotomayor.

The shooting led to the Daniel Anderl Judicial Security and Privacy Act of 2021, endorsed by the Senate Judiciary Committee on December 12 of that year. The Act was signed into law by President Joe Biden on December 23, 2022. The New Jersey Legislature passed a state law equivalent, "Daniel's Law," (P.L. 2021, c. 371) in 2021.

The Diocese of Metuchen has begun an inquiry into the possible canonization of Daniel.

During the second Trump administration, numerous jurists have received death threats referencing Anderl's killing.

== See also ==
- List of Hispanic and Latino American jurists
- List of first women lawyers and judges in New Jersey

== Notes ==
Legal offices
Preceded by Katharine Sweeney Hayden	Judge of the United States District Court for the District of New Jersey; 2011–present	Incumbent
