= National Coalition for Men v. Selective Service System =

U.S. court case ruling that male-only military conscription is unconstitutional

- Court: United States District Court for the Southern District of Texas
- Full case name: National Coalition for Men, et al. v. Selective Service System, et al.
- Decided: February 22, 2019
- Docket nos.: 4:16-cv-03362
- Defendants: Selective Service System; Donald Benton, as Director of Selective Service System
- Counsel for plaintiffs: Marc Angelucci
- Plaintiffs: National Coalition for Men; James Lesmeister, individually and on behalf of others similarly situated; Anthony Davis

Holding
- Requiring only men to register for the draft violated their Fifth Amendment right.

Court membership
- Judge sitting: Gray H. Miller

Case opinions
- Transcript

National Coalition for Men v. Selective Service System
- Court: United States Court of Appeals for the Fifth Circuit
- Full case name: National Coalition for Men, et al. v. Selective Service System, et al.
- Decided: August 13, 2020
- Docket nos.: 19-20272

Holding
- The district court's judgment is reversed because it directly contradicts the Supreme Court’s holding in Rostker v. Goldberg, 453 U.S. 57, 78–79 (1981), and only the Supreme Court may revise its precedent.

Court membership
- Judges sitting: Jacques L. Wiener Jr., Carl E. Stewart, and Don Willett

Case opinions
- Opinion
- Per curiam

National Coalition for Men v. Selective Service System was a court case that was first decided in the United States District Court for the Southern District of Texas on February 22, 2019, declaring that requiring men but disallowing women to register for the draft for military service in the United States was unconstitutional. The ruling did not specify which actions the government needed to take to resolve the conflict with the constitution (e.g., whether to abolish the draft registration requirement or apply it in a gender-neutral manner). That ruling was reversed by the Fifth Circuit.

In June 2021, the U.S. Supreme Court declined to review the decision by the Court of Appeals. In an opinion on supporting the denial, Justice Sonia Sotomayor, joined by Justices Stephen Breyer and Brett Kavanaugh, stated that while there was a constitutional argument about discrimination on sex on the current draft, they agreed to decline because Congress was actively evaluating removing the male-only requirement of the draft through the 2016 Commission, and that "the Court's longstanding deference to Congress on matters of national defense and military affairs cautions against granting review while Congress actively weighs the issue".

Following Congress's failure to act, in May 2024 the NCFM again sued the Selective Service system on the basis that the Supreme Court's ruling was not conclusive, this time in the United States District Court for the Central District of California with Judge André Birotte Jr. presiding.

== Background ==
In the United States, men between the ages of 18 and 25 and residing in the country, with limited exceptions, are required to sign up and maintain their registration in the Selective Service System, established by the Military Selective Service Act. Failure to register or maintain that can lead to fines and prison, and prevents one from several government benefits such as federally backed student loans or employment in the federal sector. Women, who are not required to serve involuntarily, are not required to register. At the time it was established, the military did not allow women to serve in combat roles. The law was challenged on the basis of gender discrimination, leading to the Supreme Court case Rostker v. Goldberg. In that 1981 case, the Supreme Court ruled that the practice of requiring only men to register for the draft was constitutional on the basis that women were restricted from serving in combat roles.

Oral Argument before the 9th Circuit in the appeal of the initial dismissal of the case.

Between 2013 and 2015, the Pentagon abolished their restrictions on women voluntarily serving in combat roles. Based on these changes, the National Coalition for Men, a non-profit men's rights organization, filed a lawsuit against the Selective Service System in the United States District Court for the Central District of California on April 4, 2013, arguing that with the Pentagon's change in female participation in combat roles, the rationale behind Rostker no longer applied, and the male-only requirement of the Selective Service System was gender-discriminatory. In 2016, the U.S. Court of Appeals for the Ninth Circuit reversed the district court's dismissal of the case and remanded the case back to the district court. The case was later moved to the United States District Court for the Southern District of Texas in the 5th Circuit.

In 2016, through a provision in the National Defense Authorization Act for Fiscal Year 2016, the Congress created the National Commission on Military, National, and Public Service, an independent bipartisan advisory commission tasked with evaluating the Selective Service System and recommending whether women should be required to register with the Selective Service, or potentially do away with the Selective Service System to avoid the gender inequality issue. On January 23, 2019, the Commission released an interim report outlining the various options. On March 25, 2020, after holding various public hearings, the Commission issued its final report, recommending that as long as the Selective Service System exists, both men and women should be subject to mandatory draft registration.

== Arguments ==
The National Coalition for Men argued in part: "Forcing only males to register is an aspect of socially institutionalized male disposability and helps reinforce the stereotypes that support discrimination against men in other areas such as child custody, divorce, criminal sentencing, paternity fraud, education, public benefits, domestic violence services, due process rights, genital autonomy, and more." Opponents of the status quo also argued that current conscription laws violate the Equal Protection Clause of the Fourteenth Amendment to the United States Constitution via reverse incorporation because the law treats men and women differently.

== Ruling ==
On February 22, 2019, Judge Gray H. Miller issued a declaratory judgment that the male-only registration requirement of the MSSA violates the Due Process Clause of the Fourteenth Amendment to the United States Constitution, since the restrictions on women serving in combat roles in the military, which were present at the time of the decision in Rostker, no longer applied and men and women are, therefore, similarly situated for purposes of a draft or registration for a draft.

== Appeal ==
The ruling was appealed to the United States Court of Appeals for the Fifth Circuit. The Eagle Forum filed an amicus curiae brief supporting continued registration of men for the draft, opposing requiring women to register, and asking the Court of Appeals to overturn the District Court decision. A coalition including the American Civil Liberties Union Foundation of Texas, American Civil Liberties Union, 9to5 National Association of Working Women, A Better Balance, Gender Justice, KWH Law Center for Social Justice and Change, National Organization for Women Foundation, National Women’s Law Center, Women’s Law Center of Maryland, and Women’s Law Project filed an amicus curiae brief arguing that the Court of Appeals should uphold the District Court finding that the current Military Selective Service Act is unconstitutional. Oral arguments on the appeal were held March 3, 2020, before a 3-judge panel of the 5th Circuit Court of Appeals at Tulane Law School in New Orleans. A decision by the panel was issued on August 13, 2020, reversing the District Court judgment on the grounds that it amounted to overturning the Supreme Court's precedent from Rostker, which only the Supreme Court has the authority to do.

== Supreme Court ==
Harry Crouch, President of the National Coalition for Men, announced that NCFM was "exploring its options, including filing a Petition for Writ of Certiorari with the United States Supreme Court". On January 8, 2021, NCFM, represented by the ACLU and cooperating counsel from Hogan Lovells, filed a petition for certiorari with the U.S. Supreme Court, asking the Supreme Court to review the decision of the 5th Circuit Court of Appeals. The case was docketed in the Supreme Court as case No. 20-928.

The Supreme Court declined to review the case in June 2021. In an opinion on supporting the denial, Justice Sonia Sotomayor, joined by Justices Stephen Breyer and Brett Kavanaugh, stated that while there was a constitutional argument about discrimination on sex on the current draft, they agreed to decline because Congress was actively evaluating removing the male-only requirement of the draft through the 2016 Commission, and that "the Court's longstanding deference to Congress on matters of national defense and military affairs cautions against granting review while Congress actively weighs the issue".

== See also ==
- Elgin v. Department of Treasury
