= United States v. Holmes =

United States v. Holmes may refer to:

- United States v. Holmes (1820), 18 U.S. (5 Wheat.) 412 (1820), holding that the burden was on the defendant to prove that his vessel flew a lawful flag
- United States v. Holmes (1842), 26 F. Cas. 360 (C.C.E.D. Pa. 1842), a criminal trial relating to the sinking of the William Brown
- United States v. Elizabeth A. Holmes, et al (2021), an ongoing criminal trial alleging wire-fraud on the part of former Theranos CEO, Elizabeth Holmes

== See also ==
- Holmes v. United States, 391 U.S. 936 (1968)
