= Elgin v. Department of Treasury =

- Supreme Court of the United States

Argued February 27, 2012 Decided June 11, 2012
- Full case name: Michael B. Elgin, et al., Petitioners v. Department of the Treasury, et al.
- Citations: 567 U.S. 1 (more) 132 S. Ct. 2126, 183 L. Ed. 2d 1, 2012 U.S. LEXIS 4461, 115 FEP Cases 257, 33 IER Cases 1505, 80 U.S.L.W. 4417

Case history
- Prior: Appeal of removal dismissed, unpublished (MSPB); partial summary judgment granted sub nom. Elgin v. United States, 594 F. Supp. 2d 133 (D. Mass. 2009); reconsidered and vacated, 697 F. Supp. 2d 187 (D. Mass. 2010); affirmed, 641 F.3d 6 (1st Cir. 2011); cert. granted, 565 U.S. 962 (2011).

Holding
- The CSRA gives exclusive jurisdiction to suits rising under the act to the MSPB, with appeals to the U.S. Court of Appeals for the Federal Circuit, and further appeals to the Supreme Court. Federal District Courts cannot rule on issues regarding the act or on adverse employment actions of the federal departments. The MSPB can hear constitutional arguments for adverse employment actions.

Court membership
- Chief Justice John Roberts Associate Justices Antonin Scalia · Anthony Kennedy; Clarence Thomas · Ruth Bader Ginsburg; Stephen Breyer · Samuel Alito; Sonia Sotomayor · Elena Kagan

Case opinions
- Majority: Thomas, joined by Roberts, Scalia, Kennedy, Breyer, Sotomayor
- Dissent: Alito, joined by Ginsburg, Kagan

Laws applied
- Civil Service Reform Act of 1978; 5 U.S.C. § §3328; 5 U.S.C. § §7512

Elgin v. Department of the Treasury, 567 U.S. 1 (2012), was a United States Supreme Court case where the Court ruled that the Civil Service Reform Act of 1978 (CSRA) gives exclusive jurisdiction for claims under the Act to the U.S. Court of Appeals for the Federal Circuit. Additionally, the Court held that the Act bars federal district courts from ruling on matters related to the act including adverse employment actions of the federal departments, and allows the Merit Systems Protection Board to hear constitutional arguments for wrongful employee severance and adverse employment actions. It was a 6–3 decision, with the majority opinion delivered by Justice Clarence Thomas. The case greatly limited the recourse of federal employees to the courts for adverse employment practices, allowing such recourse only to a few, specific courts as aforementioned.

== Prior to the Supreme Court ==
Michael B. Elgin and several other employees of the U.S. Department of the Treasury were fired for willingly and knowingly failing to register for the Selective Service, pursuant to 5 U.S.C. § 3328, which forbids any federal executive employees who committed such an omission. Elgin challenged his discharge before the Merit Systems Protection Board, claiming such a requirement is unconstitutional being a bill of attainder and a violation of the Equal Protection Clause of the Fourteenth Amendment, since only males are required to enroll in the Selective Service System. The Merit Systems Protection Board referred the case to an administrative law judge, who dismissed the appeal for lack of jurisdiction, concluding that an employee is not entitled to Merit Systems Protection Board review of agency action that is based on an absolute statutory bar to employment. The same administrative law judge further determined that the Merit Systems Protection Board lacked jurisdiction to assess the constitutionality of statutes.

Rather than appealing to the U.S. Court of Appeals for the Federal Circuit as is required by the CSRA, Elgin and several other petitioners appealed to the United States District Court for the District of Massachusetts. The court denied Elgin's claims, holding that the act and Elgin's severance was constitutional. Elgin appealed to the U.S. Court of Appeals for the First Circuit, which ruled that federal district courts have no jurisdiction over the matter. Elgin appealed to the United States Supreme Court.

== See also ==
- Rostker v. Goldberg
- National Coalition for Men v. Selective Service System
