= William Hetherington case =

Legal case

The William Hetherington case is a 1985 rape case in the U.S. state of Michigan in which William Hetherington was controversially convicted of the sexual assault of his wife during a contentious divorce case and custody dispute. Hetherington served over 24 years in custody, which he claims is due partly to exceptional hindrances in appealing the claimed injustices in the sentence. On October 27, 2009, Hetherington was finally granted a parole.

A 1994 article in Insight on the News drew attention to claims that he was either incorrectly found guilty, or grossly over-sentenced, and denied due process of law applicable to his defense.

== Background ==
William and Linda Hetherington married in 1971; the marriage was an unhappy one and between 1978 and 1985 William sought divorce, then the couple reconciled, and finally divorce was sought again. During this period, Linda brought, then withdrew, charges of spousal rape more than once, with one such incident described by an article in Insight on the News as "the first of several times that Linda would accuse her husband of raping her, at times when bringing charges was to her advantage".

In May 1985 following Linda's travelling without notice to another state, divorce was filed. It was expected that Hetherington would win custody due to Linda's history of abandonment of the children and family, for a period of more than two months. In August, Linda claimed he had raped her a month earlier and he was imprisoned briefly. Although released shortly afterwards, the timing caused custody to be given to Linda, with the judge commenting that custody would have gone to William had he not been incarcerated at the time of the hearing, but that he could apply later for custody instead.

A month later, after William was released, he applied for custody. A hearing was set for October 7, but before this could take place, Linda again accused him of rape, claiming he had taped and tied her up, threatened that she was about to "meet her maker", abducted her by car, cut her clothing off, and raped her. According to William she invited sexual intercourse at her mother's home where she was staying, then began demanding money she believed he had. After some confusion, according to "several witnesses", Linda's mother insisted charges were pressed.

== Initial conviction ==
County prosecutor Robert Weiss was responsible for prosecuting the case. He also reinstated the August case that had been dropped, and a bail bond was set at $500,000. With his assets frozen during the divorce, and his income being disability payments, William was unable to obtain bail, and unable to finance a legal defence. The court considered him to have assets, and no lawyer was provided for him as a result. Linda visited the prosecutor; stories vary at this point as to whether or not she sought charges to be dropped, and whether she was relieved or reluctant they were not.

Eventually William persuaded an attorney, David Wright, to represent him, for a $10,000 fee to be paid from his disability checks.

As trial approached in May 1986, the prosecutor offered a plea bargain, that if he pleaded guilty to a single charge of first degree rape, and a court-appointed psychologist concluded that he was not a danger to his ex-wife, he would receive a delayed sentence of 11 months, or probation with credit for time served. Williams claims the offer was made coercively.

The article in Insight on the News is sharply critical of the evidence. A pelvic examination of Linda three hours after the incident showed no evidence of forcible injury, described as "very unusual" in a rape case by the doctor. Although police officers stated that possible adhesive tape traces were visible on her face, doctors examining her found that no traces of that kind existed, and the scissors alleged to be used to cut the tape showed no adhesive traces either. Other evidence - the tape, gloves and underwear - was said by Linda to have been flushed down the toilet by her assailant. A neighbor, Reinhardt, added further evidence that contradicted the story - that William's car had been at the location Linda alleged she was abducted and therefore she had known he was there (she claimed she had not known), and that during the time of the rape she had left the house to get something from the car, then returned to the house to talk further. Sperm was found in Linda's clothing; however William had previously had a vasectomy, a form of sterilization which makes a man incapable of emitting sperm.

The court-appointed psychiatrist was supportive of William's case. Lacking prior record, sentencing guidelines at the time were 6 to 10 years (average time served by a convicted rapist in Michigan is 5 years), and this was reinforced by a "highly favourable" report that concluded William's personality seemed to "substantiate his explanation of what has occurred", and that "this is not a man who would force himself sexually or hostilely on another individual ... He does not appear to be an individual who is dangerous for society."

There was also suspicion that the prosecution was motivated by other factors. Conservative commentator Phyllis Schlafly claimed that Weiss, who was running for the Michigan Supreme Court at the time, was "grandstanding for the feminist vote." Insight Magazine wrote:

In the midst of running for the Michigan Supreme Court, Weiss made a dramatic statement in which he asserted that 'murder may have been less harmful' than William's acts. He also painted a picture of a grislier crime than the one in question: 'He raped her four times at a minimum, on a single day ... every opening of her body, every cavity, had been invaded violently.' (The charges involved one act of forced oral sex and one act of vaginal penetration, with no allegations of anal intercourse.) Urging the court to 'Let the women of this world know this is not tolerated,' he asked for a sentence of 30 to 60 years."

Likewise the judge, Thomas Yeotis, discredited the psychiatrists view on the grounds that "you make a nice appearance, and yet, there's something about you that disturbs me." The psychiatrist was one whose opinion the judge is said to have "relied on" for 20 years before, and continued to do so after.
