= National Coalition for Men =

American civil rights organization

- Founded: 1977
- Founder: Tom Williamson, Naomi Penner
- Type: 501(c)(3)
- Purpose: Men's rights, Fathers' rights, Masculism
- Location: San Diego, California (headquarters)
- Key people: Harry Crouch, President; Marc Angelucci, Vice-President (Deceased); Al Rava, Secretary; Deborah Watkins, Treasurer
- Website: NCFM.org

The National Coalition for Men (NCFM), founded in 1977, is a non-profit civil rights organization in the United States that focuses on issues affecting boys, men, and their families. It is a volunteer-driven group that examines gender-related biases in legal, social, and institutional contexts. It claims to be politically neutral, "neither liberal nor conservative."

== Foundation ==
Free Men, Inc. was founded in Columbia, Maryland in January 1977. The name "Free Men" was used as an imperative (as in "free men from unfair divorce laws"). By-laws were formally adopted in July. The four founding members were: Richard Haddad, Dennis Gilbert, Allan Scheib and Allen Foreman. Rich Allison serves as a frequent litigant representative. Richard Haddad authored the "Free Men Philosophy" which included 26 items from which he felt men should be freed. These represented options. The first newsletter was named "Options".

This early chapter concentrated on forming "support groups" for men as counterparts to "consciousness raising groups" tailored to women.

Initial national interest resulted from appearances by author Herb Goldberg, author of The Hazards of Being Male. By 1980, the Free Men. Inc. organization in Columbia had begun to disintegrate. Nevertheless, undaunted by local circumstance in Columbia, others in different parts of the country began forming groups associated with the Maryland organization. Two new groups formed chapters in Boston, Massachusetts (Headed by Frederic Hayward, founder of Men's Rights, Inc. A strong supporter was Robert A. Sides who went on to represent NCFM on national television and radio talk shows) and Nassau County, New York. The strongest of the two was in Nassau County. As a result, it received all of Free Men, Inc.'s records as it became clear that the Maryland group was going to fold.

== History ==
As of 2006, the National Coalition of Free Men had five chapters from California to New York. In the spring of 2008, the organization changed its name to the National Coalition for Men.

NCFM championed the case of William Hetherington until his parole in 2009.

The NCFM supported a Republican version of the Violence Against Women Act in 2012. The organization argued that the bill written by Senate Democrats excluded heterosexual men and would empower "false accusers at the expense of true victims", and encouraged women present in the country without legal documents to make false accusations of abuse in order to stay in the country. The liberal Center for American Progress has criticized the NCFM for its stance on the issue, as did the Southern Poverty Law Center.

The NCFM has engaged in controversial behavior such as publicly outing alleged sexual assault victims whose cases were dismissed due to lack of evidence and labelling these women as "false accusers". Critics argue that this discourages survivors from coming forward, and poisions the dialogue on campus sexual assault.

In July 2020, NCFM's vice president and main attorney in several lawsuits, Marc Angelucci, was murdered at his home by a previous member of NCFM and rival men's rights activist, Roy Den Hollander, who is also suspected of murdering the son of a US District Judge.

== Lawsuits ==
In 2005 the NCFM filed a lawsuit against the state of California for funding domestic violence shelters for women only. In 2008 the Court of Appeal ruled in their favor and held that the exclusion of male victims violates men's rights to equal protection and "carries with it the baggage of sexual stereotypes", because "men experience significant levels of domestic violence as victims"

The NCFM filed a lawsuit, National Coalition for Men v. Selective Service System, that challenges the legality of requiring only males to register for the military draft. The lawsuit was filed against the U.S. Selective Service System in the United States District Court for the Central District of California on April 4, 2013. In 2016, the U.S. Court of Appeals for the Ninth Circuit reversed the district court's dismissal of the case and remanded the case back to the district court. The case was later moved to the United States District Court for the Southern District of Texas in the 5th Circuit. On February 22, 2019, Judge Gray H. Miller issued a declaratory judgement that the male-only registration requirement is unconstitutional. In 2021, the American Civil Liberties Union filed a petition for a writ of certiorari to the Supreme Court on behalf of the National Coalition of Men. In June of that year, the Supreme Court denied the writ, with Justice Sotomayor citing "the Court's longstanding deference to Congress on matters of national defense and military affairs," especially while Congress was in the process of assessing the need for male-only drafts.

== Criticism ==
The Southern Poverty Law Center flags the National Coalition for Men as a Male Supremacy Hate Group. The Center states that the group "distorts statistics to create female privilege […] and creates false equivalencies between the oppression of men and of women."
