= Holmes v. United States =

- Supreme Court of the United States

Decided May 27, 1968
- Full case name: Albert H. Holmes v. United States
- Citations: 391 U.S. 936 (more) 88 S. Ct. 1835; 20 L. Ed. 2d 856; 1968 U.S. LEXIS 1576

Case history
- Prior: United States v. Holmes, 387 F.2d 781 (7th Cir. 1967)

Holding
- Certiorari denied.

Court membership
- Chief Justice Earl Warren Associate Justices Hugo Black · William O. Douglas; John M. Harlan II · William J. Brennan Jr. Potter Stewart · Byron White; Abe Fortas · Thurgood Marshall

Case opinions
- Concurrence: Stewart
- Dissent: Douglas

Holmes v. United States, 391 U.S. 936 (1968), was a case in which the Supreme Court of the United States denied a petition for writ of certiorari to a Jehovah's Witnesses minister who asked the Court to decide whether a draft of men into the Armed Forces in times of peace is constitutionally permissible. The minister argued that, in the absence of a declaration of war, a draft was not authorized and was equivalent to involuntary servitude.

== Facts of the case ==
Albert H. Holmes was classified in August 1965 as a conscientious objector by his Selective Service Appeal Board. Section 6(j) of the Universal Military Training and Service Act of 1948 stated that a conscientious objector who, like petitioner, is also opposed to noncombatant military service, may in lieu of induction "be ordered by his local board ... to perform ... such civilian work contributing to the maintenance of the national health, safety, or interest as the local board may deem appropriate." Beginning in October 1965 Holmes exchanged a series of letters with his local board in which the Board explained to Holmes the types of civilian work available and Holmes asserted his religious scruples against serving the United States Government in any capacity, including civilian work programs. Holmes reiterated this position in a personal meeting with his local board.

On February 7, 1966, the Board sent Holmes an order to report on February 21 to an Illinois state hospital for civilian work assignment. However, on the day he was due to report, Holmes notified the Board that he refused to do so for religious reasons.

== Prior history ==
Holmes was charged with willful failure to report as ordered, in violation of 12(a) of the Selective Service Act. At his nonjury trial Holmes moved for judgment of acquittal. That motion was denied, Holmes was convicted and sentenced to three years imprisonment, and the Court of Appeals affirmed, one judge dissenting.
