= Military Selective Service Act =

1948 US Federal law regarding selective service

- Other short titles: Elston Act; Selective Service Act of 1948
- Long title: An Act to provide for the common defense by increasing the strength of the armed forces of the United States, including the reserve components thereof, and for other purposes.
- Enacted by: the 80th United States Congress
- Effective: June 24, 1948

Citations
- Public law: 80-759
- Statutes at Large: 62 Stat. 604, Chapter 625

Codification
- Titles amended: 50 U.S.C.: War and National Defense
- U.S.C. sections created: 50 U.S.C. Appendix §§ 451-473

Legislative history
- Introduced in the Senate as S. 2655 by Robert A. Taft (R–OH), Charles Elston (R–OH); Passed the Senate on June 9, 1948 (78-10); Passed the House on June 15, 1948 (329-61, in lieu of H.R. 6401); Reported by the joint conference committee on June 19, 1948; agreed to by the House on June 19, 1948 (259-136); Signed into law by President Harry S. Truman on June 24, 1948

United States Supreme Court cases
- Rostker v. Goldberg, 453 U.S. 57 (1981)

The Selective Service Act of 1948, also known as the Elston Act, was a United States federal law enacted June 24, 1948, that established the current implementation of the Selective Service System.

== History ==
The previous iteration of the Selective Service System was established by the Selective Training and Service Act of 1940. After two extensions, the Selective Training and Service Act was allowed to expire on March 31, 1947. In 1948, it was replaced by a new and distinct Selective Service System established by this Act. The Selective Service Act of 1948 was originally intended to remain in effect for two years (i.e., until June 24, 1950), but was extended multiple times, usually immediately before its two-year period of effectiveness was due to expire. Provisions of the law relating to the authority to induct men into the military expired on July 1, 1973. Amendments, extensions, and changes of name to the act since 1948 include:

- Extended until July 9, 1950, by Pub. L. 81–572, 64 Stat. 254, enacted June 23, 1950
- Extended until July 9, 1951, by Pub. L. 81–599, 64 Stat. 318, enacted June 30, 1950
- Change of name to the Universal Military Training and Service Act and extended until July 1, 1953, by Pub. L. 82–51, 65 Stat. 75, enacted June 19, 1951
- Amended by Pub. L. 82–461, 66 Stat. 440, enacted July 7, 1952
- Extended until July 1, 1955, by Pub. L. 83–84, 67 Stat. 86, enacted June 29, 1953
- Extended until July 1, 1959, by Pub. L. 84–118, 69 Stat. 223, enacted June 30, 1955
- Amended by Pub. L. 84–146, 69 Stat. 295, enacted July 12, 1955
- Amended by Pub. L. 84–665, 70 Stat. 509, enacted July 9, 1956
- Amended by Pub. L. 85–62, 71 Stat. 206, enacted June 26, 1957
- Amended by Pub. L. 85–564, 72 Stat. 424, enacted July 28, 1958
- Extended until July 1, 1963, by Pub. L. 86–4, 73 Stat. 13, enacted March 23, 1959
- Amended by Pub. L. 86–632, 74 Stat. 467, enacted July 12, 1960
- Amended by Pub. L. 87–391, 75 Stat. 821, enacted October 4, 1961
- Amended by Pub. L. 87–536, 76 Stat. 167, enacted July 18, 1962
- Extended until July 1, 1967, by Pub. L. 88–2, 77 Stat. 4, enacted March 28, 1963
- Amended by Pub. L. 88–110, 77 Stat. 134, enacted September 3, 1963
- Amended by Pub. L. 88–360, 78 Stat. 296, enacted July 7, 1964
- Amended by Pub. L. 89–152, 79 Stat. 586, enacted August 30, 1965
- Change of name to the Military Selective Service Act of 1967 and extension until July 1, 1971, by Pub. L. 90–40, 81 Stat. 100, enacted June 30, 1967
- Amended by Pub. L. 90–491, 82 Stat. 790, enacted August 17, 1968
- Amended by Pub. L. 91–124, 83 Stat. 220, enacted November 26, 1969
- Change of name to the Military Selective Service Act and extension until July 1, 1973, by Pub. L. 92–129, 85 Stat. 348, enacted September 28, 1971

In 2019, U.S. District Court in Southern Texas Judge Gray Miller ruled in National Coalition for Men v. Selective Service System that exempting women from the male-only draft was unconstitutional. This ruling was later reversed by the United States Court of Appeals for the Fifth Circuit, and the Supreme Court of the United States declined to hear the case.

In 2024, a bipartisan group of senators, including Rand Paul, Ron Wyden, and Cynthia Lummis, introduced legislation to end the military draft, calling it outdated and unnecessary. The bill aimed to repeal the Military Selective Service Act, which hasn't been used since the Vietnam War. The move followed debates on including women in the draft, a proposal repeatedly removed from the National Defense Authorization Act despite rising program costs.

== See also ==
- Selective Service System
- Conscription in the United States
