= Rostker v. Goldberg =

- Supreme Court of the United States

Argued March 24, 1981 Decided June 25, 1981
- Full case name: Bernard Rostker, Director of Selective Service, et al. v. Robert L. Goldberg, et al.
- Citations: 453 U.S. 57 (more) 101 S. Ct. 2646; 69 L. Ed. 2d 478; 1981 U.S. LEXIS 126

Case history
- Prior: Goldberg v. Rostker, 509 F. Supp. 586 (E.D. Pa. 1980)

Holding
- The Act's registration provisions do not violate the Fifth Amendment. Congress acted well within its constitutional authority to raise and regulate armies and navies when it authorized the registration of men and not women.

Court membership
- Chief Justice Warren E. Burger Associate Justices William J. Brennan Jr. · Potter Stewart; Byron White · Thurgood Marshall; Harry Blackmun · Lewis F. Powell Jr. William Rehnquist · John P. Stevens

Case opinions
- Majority: Rehnquist, joined by Burger, Stewart, Blackmun, Powell, Stevens
- Dissent: White, joined by Brennan
- Dissent: Marshall, joined by Brennan

Laws applied
- U.S. Const. amend. V., Military Selective Service Act (50 U.S.C. 451 et seq. (1976 ed. and Supp. III))

Rostker v. Goldberg, 453 U.S. 57 (1981), is a decision of the Supreme Court of the United States holding that the practice of requiring only men to register for the draft was constitutional. After extensive hearings, floor debate and committee sessions on the matter, the United States Congress reauthorized the law, as it had previously been, to apply to men only. Several attorneys, including Robert L. Goldberg, subsequently challenged the Act as gender distinction. In a 6–3 decision, the Supreme Court upheld the Act, holding that its gender distinction was not a violation of the equal protection component of the Due Process Clause of the Fifth Amendment.

== Background ==
The Military Selective Service Act of 1948 (Act), revised in 1967, authorizes the president to require the registration for possible military service of males, but not females. While the Act was amended in 1973 to prohibit conscription, the purpose of registration is to facilitate conscription under the Act when deemed necessary by the president and Congress.

Registration for the draft was discontinued by presidential proclamation in 1975. In 1980, President Jimmy Carter re-established registration under the Selective Service System following the Soviet Union's invasion of Afghanistan. Carter asked Congress to provide funding for registration and to amend the Act so that registration would be extended to include women. The question of registering women for the Selective Service System received not only considerable national attention, including wide-ranging public debate, but was also extensively debated by Congress in hearings, floor debate, and in committee. Following debate, the House on April 22, and the Senate on June 12, passed a joint resolution to resume the registration process. However, Congress did not approve the full funding requested by Carter and did not amend the Act to require the registration of women. Registration of men began on July 21, 1980.

=== District Court ===
In 1971 an anti-war group, the Philadelphia Resistance, gathered a group of young male high school students, including Andrew Rowland, his brother, David Sitman and David Fruedman to protest the draft. In Rowland v. Tarr (1971) the United States District Court for the Eastern District of Pennsylvania heard a challenge to the MSSA on several grounds, one of which was gender discrimination. In 1974, they were not granted a 3-judge court opinion because the draft was now discontinued. This group of men petitioned again in 1974 in Goldberg v. Tarr. Robert Goldberg was a medical student at Penn State who registered and claimed to be a conscientious objector. In July 1980, just a few days before registration was to commence again, the district court offered an opinion claiming that the MSSA violated the Due Process Clause of the Fifth Amendment.

The director of the Selective Service System, Bernard Rostker, filed an appeal and Justice William J. Brennan Jr., Circuit Justice for the Third Circuit, stayed the district court's decision and registration began as scheduled. The Supreme Court subsequently granted certiorari.

=== Arguments ===
The Army and Marine Corps precluded the use of women in combat as a matter of established policy, and both the Navy and the Air Force restricted women's participation in combat. Even President Carter, who had originally suggested that women be included, expressed his intent to continue the current military policy excluding women from combat. Since the purpose of registration was to prepare for a draft of combat troops, and since women are excluded from combat, Congress concluded that they would not be needed in the event of a draft, and therefore decided funds should not be used to register them. As one Senator said, “It has been suggested that all women be registered, but only a handful actually be inducted in an emergency. The Committee finds this a confused and ultimately unsatisfactory solution." As the Senate Committee recognized a year before, "training would be needlessly burdened by women recruits who could not be used in combat." All in all, the proponents of the current MSSA advocated not using government funds to register people who were excluded from the job anyway. The main point of those who favored the registration of females was that females were in favor of it because of gender equality principles; women, as full citizens, ought to have the same civic duties and responsibilities as men.

== Opinion of the Court ==
Writing for the majority, then-Associate Justice William Rehnquist reasoned that because a recent session of Congress had clearly continued to condone exclusion of women from the draft, this policy could not be attributed to historical sexism. Law professor Jill Hasday has argued that this reasoning ignores that many of the legislators who opposed expanding the draft to include women explicitly cited their support for traditional gender roles.

=== Dissenting opinion ===
Justices White, Marshall, and Brennan dissented. Justice White did not think that excluding women “offended the Constitution” but rather that Congress did not “conclude that every position in the military, no matter how far removed from combat, must be filled with combat ready men.” Marshall dissented on the principle of equal civic obligation.

== Later developments ==
In 2013, the U.S. military began removing restrictions on women in certain combat situations, and by 2015, had eliminated all restrictions barring women from combat. A new suit, brought by the National Coalition for Men, charged that with the removal of service restrictions, the Selective Service System's men-only requirement failed the Equal Protection Clause. Judge Gray H. Miller of the United States District Court for the Southern District of Texas ruled in National Coalition for Men v. Selective Service System in February 2019 in favor of the plaintiffs, that the Service's men-only requirement was unconstitutional, though issued no order or injunction. Judge Miller wrote that while at the time Rostker was decided, women were banned from serving in combat, the situation has since changed with the 2013 and 2015 restriction removals. Miller's opinion was reversed by the Fifth Circuit, stating that only the Supreme Court could overturn the Supreme Court precedence from Rostker. The Supreme Court considered but declined to review the Fifth Circuit's ruling in June 2021. In an opinion authored by Justice Sonia Sotomayor and joined by Justices Stephen Breyer and Brett Kavanaugh, the three justices agreed that the male-only draft was likely unconstitutional given the changes in the military's stance on the roles, but because Congress had been reviewing and evaluating legislation to eliminate its male-only draft requirement via the National Commission on Military, National, and Public Service (NCMNPS) since 2016, it would have been inappropriate for the Court to act at that time.

== See also ==
- United States v. Virginia (1996)
- Women in the military
- Conscription in the United States#Legality
