= Cedarpines Park, California =

- Unincorporated community
- Location within California Location within the United States
- Coordinates: 34°15′00″N 117°19′33″W
- Country: United States
- State: California
- County: San Bernardino
- Elevation: 4,734 ft (1,443 m)
- Time zone: UTC-8 (Pacific Standard Time (PST))
  - Summer (DST): UTC-7 (PDT)
- ZIP Code: 92322
- Area code: 909
- GNIS feature ID: 1660455

Cedarpines Park is an unincorporated community located in the San Bernardino Mountains of San Bernardino County, California, United States. Positioned west of Crestline, the community is situated at an elevation of 4,734 feet (1,443 meters) and is located within the San Bernardino National Forest.

Featuring a scenic mountain setting, Cedarpines Park features Mixed conifer forests, seasonal streams, snowy winters, and a variety of historic residences. The community maintains a rural character while offering proximity to major urban centers in Southern California. It has attracted residents seeking a quieter, nature-oriented lifestyle, contributing to a gradual increase in population in recent years.

Cedarpines Park is recognized for its low crime rates, community-oriented culture, and recreational opportunities. It includes amenities such as a community center and playground. Additionally, the Heart Rock Trail, located near Camp Seely, is a family-friendly 1.7-mile out-and-back hike that follows Seeley Creek and leads to a heart-shaped rock formation beside a 20-foot waterfall. The area is served by the ZIP code 92322 and falls under area code 909.

The Cedarpines Park post office was originally established in 1927. It experienced a temporary closure from 1943 to 1946 during World War II.
