= National Commission on Military, National, and Public Service =

Agency overview
- Agency executive: Kent Abernathy, Executive Director
- Website: inspire2serve.gov

The National Commission on Military, National, and Public Service was a United States temporary federal agency established by the National Defense Authorization Act for Fiscal Year 2017.

== Purpose ==
The commission was formed by Congress to:

1. conduct a review of the military selective service process (commonly referred to as ‘‘the draft’’); and
2. consider methods to increase participation in military, national, and public service in order to address national security and other public service needs of the Nation.

== Scope of Review ==
The legislation creating the commission outlined that the commission should consider:

1. the need for a military selective service process, including the continuing need for a mechanism to draft large numbers of replacement combat troops;
2. means by which to foster a greater attitude and ethos of service among United States youth, including an increased propensity for military service;
3. the feasibility and advisability of modifying the military selective service process in order to obtain for military, national, and public service individuals with skills (such as medical, dental, and nursing skills, language skills, cyber skills, and science, technology, engineering, and mathematics (STEM) skills) for which the Nation has a critical need, without regard to age or sex; and
4. the feasibility and advisability of including in the military selective service process, as so modified, an eligibility or entitlement for the receipt of one or more Federal benefits (such as educational benefits, subsidized or secured student loans, grants or hiring preferences) specified by the Commission for purposes of the review.

== Commissioners ==
Appointed members of the Commission were:

Commissioner	Background	Appointed by	Position
Edward T. Allard III	former Deputy Director of the Selective Service System	Nancy Pelosi	
Steve Barney	former General Counsel to the Senate Armed Services Committee	John McCain	
Janine Davidson	former Under Secretary of the Navy	Barack Obama	
Mark Gearan	former director of the Peace Corps	Jack Reed	Vice Chair for National and Public Service
Avril Haines	former Principal Deputy National Security Advisor	Barack Obama	
Joe Heck	Brigadier General, U.S. Army Reserve; former Member of the House of Representatives (R-NV)	Mitch McConnell	Chairman
Jeanette James	former Professional Staff Member of the House Armed Services Committee	Mac Thornberry	
Alan Khazei	Founder and Chief Executive Officer of Be the Change, Inc.	Chuck Schumer	
Thomas Kilgannon	President of Freedom Alliance	Paul Ryan	
Shawn Skelly	former director, Executive Secretariat, U.S. Department of Transportation	Barack Obama	
Debra Wada	former Assistant Secretary of the Army (Manpower and Reserve Affairs)	Adam Smith	Vice Chair for Military Service

== Activities ==
The Commission requested written comments from the public on a list of questions it was considering, and held a series of hearings and site visits in 2018 including public meetings in Harrisburg, Pennsylvania, and Denver, Colorado. In 2019, the Commission held a series of formal public hearings with panels of invited witnesses. According to documents released in response to a Freedom Of Information Act (FOIA) request, the Commission also held closed-door meetings and received closed-door briefings. On 13 November 2019, members of the Commission held a conference call with anti-draft organizations and activists.

Minutes of the commission's deliberations and decisions were released by the National Archives and Records Administration in response to FOIA requests after the Commission was disbanded. In July 2018, the Commission voted 10-0 (one of the 11 members was absent and cast no vote by proxy) to recommend continued contingency planning for a draft. That left open the question of whether to continue, expand, or modify the Selective Service registration program. The Commission decided on most of its recommendations during a series of meetings from July 15–19, 2019, that it described as a "VOTE-O_RAMA". There were 7 Democratic appointments to the Commission (including 4 Congressional appointments and 3 appointments by President Obama) and 4 Republican Congressional appointments. To preclude purely party-line decisions, the Commissioners agreed to require 8 votes for any final recommendation. On 16 July 2019, the Commissioners voted 7-4 in favor of recommending expanding draft registration to women. According to their own self-imposed rules, this left them unable to make a recommendation on this issue. Two days later, after one of the Commissioners in the minority had been persuaded to change their vote, the NCMNPS reconsidered the question and voted 8-3 to recommend expanding draft registration to women.

== Reports ==
On January 23, 2019, the Commission released an interim report outlining the various options. On March 25, 2020, after holding various public hearings and closed-door, invitation-only meetings, the Commission issued its final report. The report recommends that the requirement for young men to register with the Selective Service System should be retained and should be expanded to include young women as well. The report also made various other recommendations with respect to the Selective Service System and voluntary national and public (government) service.
