= Androcide =

Systematic murder of males

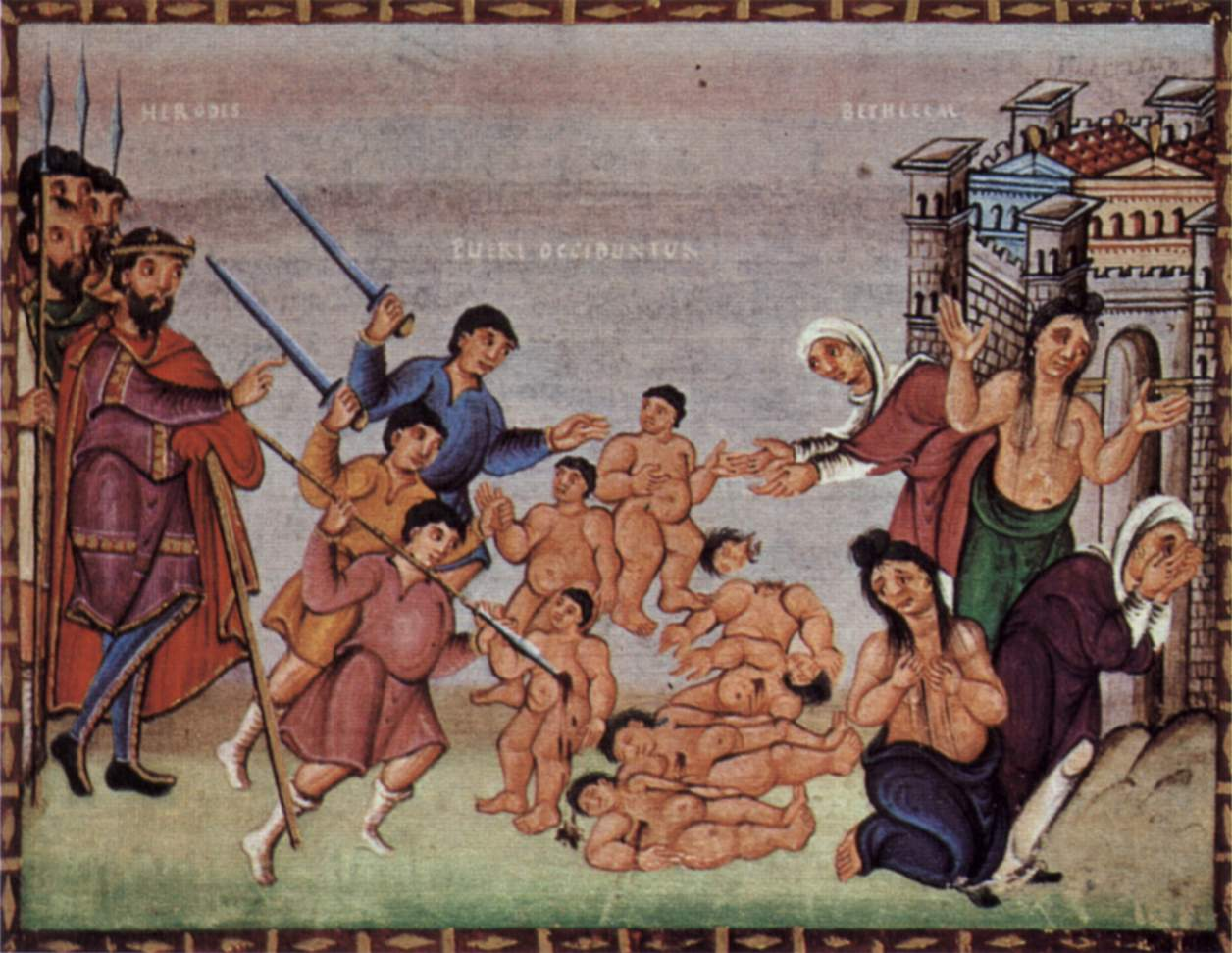
In the biblical narrative the Massacre of the Innocents, boys under the age of two were selected to be executed by the Herodian Kingdom of Judea.

Androcide is the systematic killing of men because of their sex. Androcide could occur during war or genocide. This may be due to the fact that male civilians are often targeted during warfare as a way to remove those considered to be potential combatants, and during genocide as a way to destroy the entire community.

== Etymology ==
The etymological root of the hybrid word is derived from a combination of the Greek prefix andro meaning "man" or boy, with the Latin suffix cide, meaning killing.

== Causes ==
As military services will generally forcibly conscript men to fight in warfare this inevitably leads to massive male casualties. However this gender divide extents to non-combatants as well, with male non-combatants making up a majority of the casualties of mass killings in warfare. This practice often occurs because opposing males, fighting or otherwise, are seen as potential rivals and/or military threats. This can extend to underaged males as well, often with distinction as to their age. For example, during the Kosovo War, the Yugoslav forces under Slobodan Milošević were accused of massacring many male Albanians of "battle age" because they saw them as a threat.

Androcide may also be part of a larger genocide where perpetrators treat male and female victims differently. For example, during the Armenian genocide, elite men were publicly executed; average men and adolescent boys would then be killed en masse. The age distinction was sometimes males fifteen and older, but was generally males as young as twelve. The remaining the women, children, and in some cases spared elderly men in their communities were deported. Gendercide Watch, an independent human rights group, regards this as a gendercide against men. However, this gendered treatment of victims was not universal; in many locations women and girls were also subject to massacre.

Men's rights activists such as Paul Nathanson, author of Replacing Misandry: A Revolutionary History of Men, argue that the draft is a form of androcide. In many countries, only men are subjected to military conscription, which leaves them at greater risk of death during warfare compared to women. Worldwide, males constitute 79% of non-conflict homicides and the majority of direct conflict deaths.

Androcide has also been a feature of literature in ancient Greek mythology and in hypothetical situations wherein there is discord between the sexes.

== Examples ==
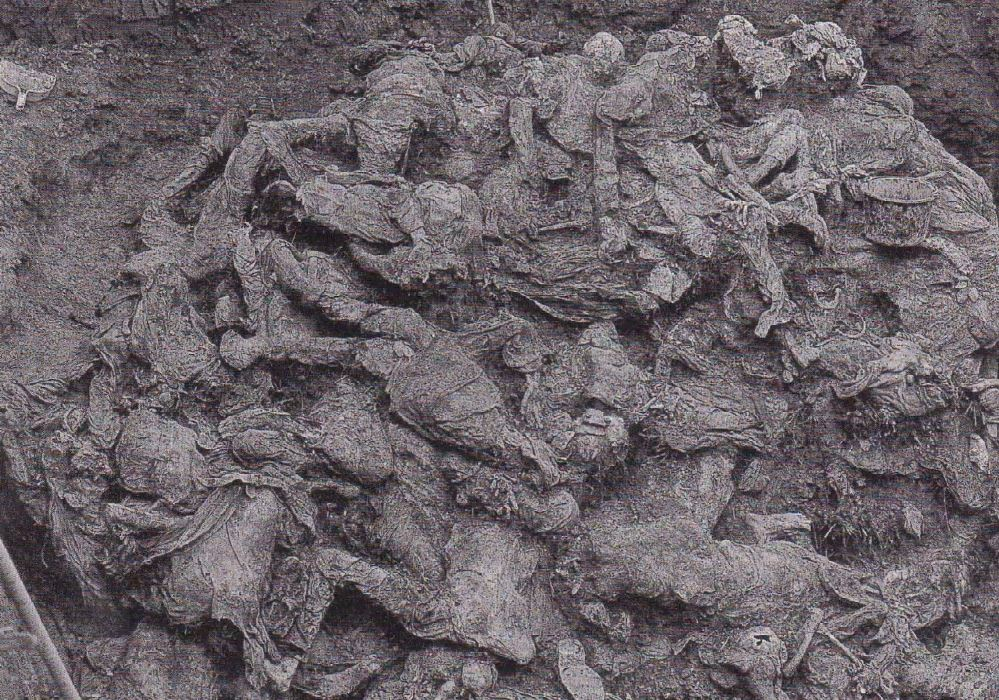
Exhumed victims of the Srebrenica massacre

- Genghis Khan was among many recorded warlords who employed the mass murder of men and boys he felt threatened by regardless of if they were soldiers, civilians, or simply in the way. After their conquest of the Tatars in 1202, Genghis and Ong Khan ordered the execution of every Tatar man and boy taller than a linchpin, while Tatar women were made into sex slaves. This was done as an act of collective punishment for their supposed fatal poisoning of Genghis Khan's father. Likewise, in the year 1211 Genghis Khan had planned on the wide-scale killing of males in retaliation for the revolt against his daughter Alakhai Bekhi, until she persuaded him to only punish the murderers of her husband, the event which caused the revolt.
- After the Haitian Revolution Haitian general and self-proclaimed monarch Jean-Jacques Dessalines, both out of a desire for vengeance and in fear of invasion and a possible return to slavery, ordered his soldiers to massacre the remaining Frenchmen of Haiti. The 1804 Haitian massacre began with males as its exclusive targets; it was only later, after Dessalines's advisors argued that the French would not be truly eradicated if French women were left to give birth to French men, that he ordered the massacre of French women as well. Only those who agreed to marry black Haitian men were spared.
- During World War II, German soldiers killed millions of male Russian prisoners of war (POWs) via starvation, exposure to the elements, exposure to disease in cramped POW camps, or outright execution.
- During the Kosovo War of 1998–1999, Slobodan Milošević's men killed many young Albanian men because they were perceived as threats or potential terrorists.
- The Srebrenica massacre, a part of the Bosnian genocide, saw more than 8,000 Bosniak men and boys killed in and around the town of Srebrenica in the aftermath of the siege, with the killings perpetrated by units of the Army of Republika Srpska (VRS) under Ratko Mladić.
- During the Yazidi genocide by the Soran Emirate (1832-1834), the forces of Mir Muhammad killed all males that fell into their hands, whether men or older boys, while Yazidi women and children were abducted and sold in markets instead.
- During the Armenian genocide of the 1910s, Turkish irregulars massacred Armenian men. Men were the traditional heads of the family, so killing them meant that the remainder of the community was defenseless and without leadership. The women were then subjected to rape, sex slavery, kidnapping, forced conversion, and forced marriage. Although men were typically massacred first, women were also massacred or died during death marches. Both the murder of men and the sexual violence against women furthered the plan to exterminate the Armenian population.
- Analysis of existing mortality estimates of the Cambodian genocide show that men accounted for 81% of all violent deaths and 67% of all excess deaths in this period. The killing of about 50–70% of Cambodia’s working-age men lead to a shift in norms regarding the sexual division of labor and correlates with present-day indicators of women's economic advancements and increased representation in local-level elected office.
- The Anfal genocide of 1988 killed between 50,000 and 182,000 Kurds and thousands of Assyrians during the final stages of the Iran–Iraq War. This act committed during the Anfal Campaign was led by Ali Hassan al-Majid, under the orders of President Saddam Hussein. Anfal, which officially began in 1988, had eight stages in six geographical areas. Every stage followed the same patterns: steer civilians to points near the main road, where they were met by the jash forces and transported to temporary meeting points. After transport, they were then separated into three groups: teenage boys and men, women and children, and the elderly. The men and teenage boys were never to be seen again. Women, all children, and the elderly of both genders were sent to camps; men were immediately stripped out of their clothes, only wearing a sharwal, and were executed. Gendercide Watch also regards this case as a gendercide against men. Many Kurd men and boys were killed in order to reduce the chance of ever fighting back. Paul Nathanson theorized that men kill other men in order to protect their territory and ward off attacks.
- The Rwandan genocide of 1994 caused the death of hundreds of thousands of ethnic Tutsi people. Men were the primary targets for killing, while women were the primary targets for rape and mutilation. Because of this, Gendercide Watch describes the Rwandan genocide as a gendercide against men, even though men were not the sole victims; Tutsi women were also murdered.

== Plants ==
With regards to plants, androcide may refer to efforts to direct pollination through emasculating certain crops.

In cannabis cultivation, male plants are culled once identified to prevent fertilisation of female plants due to the fact unfertilised female plants produce parthenocarpic fruits.

== Mythology ==
In the Ancient Greek myth of the Trojan War, accounts of which are largely legendary, the Greeks killed all the men and boys of Troy after conquering it. Even infants and the elderly were not spared; the Greeks wanted to prevent a future Trojan rebellion or uprising. The female Trojans were raped and enslaved rather than being killed.

In the Nativity narrative of the Gospel of Matthew (2:16–18) in which Herod the Great, king of Judea, orders the execution of all male children who are two years old and under in the vicinity of Bethlehem, in an event commonly known as the Massacre of the Innocents. It is modelled by the story of Pharaoh's attempt to kill the Israelite children in the Book of Exodus, as told in an expanded version that was current in the first century CE. Most scholars find no support for the historicity of Matthew's account of this event.

== See also ==
- Male expendability
- Violence against men
- Misandry
- Femicide
- Masculism
- Patriarchy
- Misogyny
- Matriarchy
- Sexism
- SCUM Manifesto
- Violence against women

== Sources ==
- Derderian, Katharine (2005). "Common fate, different experience: gender-specific aspects of the Armenian Genocide, 1915–1917". Holocaust and Genocide Studies. 19 (1): 1–25. doi:10.1093/hgs/dci001. PMID 20684092.
- Girard, Philippe (2005a). "Caribbean genocide: racial war in Haiti, 1802–4". Patterns of Prejudice. 39 (2: Colonial Genocide): 138–161. doi:10.1080/00313220500106196. S2CID 145204936.
  Reprinted in: Moses, Dirk; Stone, Dan, eds. (2013). Colonialism and Genocide. Hoboken: Taylor and Francis. pp. 42–65. ISBN 978-1-317-99753-5.
- Jones, Adam (2000). "Gendercide and Genocide". Journal of Genocide Studies. 2 (2). Taylor & Francis: 185–211. doi:10.1080/713677599. S2CID 143867857.
- Girard, Philippe R. (2011). The Slaves Who Defeated Napoleon: Toussaint Louverture and the Haitian War of Independence 1801–1804. Tuscaloosa, Alabama: The University of Alabama Press. ISBN 978-0-8173-1732-4.
