= Gender-related violence =

Gender-related violence, also known as gender-based violence (GBV), refers to any kind of violence directed against people due to their gender or gender identification, culture may have a role to play, being lower in egalitarianism societies and higher, sexist (misogynistic and misandrist) societies.

In ancient text are mentioned many acts of violence against other people, particularly towards women because they were seen as weaker and less defensive members of the societies, and due to the lack of a legislation that protect them against harm doers.

== Types of gender-related violence include ==
- Violence against women
- Violence against men
- Violence against LGBTQ people
  - Violence against transgender people, including non-binary people
- School-related gender-based violence

=== Gender-related crimes ===
- Sexual exploitation of minors
- Female genital mutilation
- Forced marriage
- Child marriage
- Forced circumcision
- Arranged marriage
- Forced prostitution
- Technology-facilitated gender-based violence

=== Gender-related crimes and homicides ===
- Honor killing
- Crime of passion
- Femicide
- Domestic violence
- Blood feud
- Dowry death
- Androcide

== See also ==
- Gender and violence
- Sexual harassment
- Sexual violence
- Category:Gender-related violence
