= Strength theory =

Anthropological theory

Strength theory, the strength hypothesis or strength differences is an idea in anthropology and gender studies. Scholars use it to explain why some cultures assign some forms of work to women and other forms of work to men. In a strength theory model, cultures give certain tasks to men because men are stronger.

Ember et al. give the examples of mining and hunting large animals, which are heavily male-dominated in many cultures. They note, however, that this does not explain why men would be assigned other tasks that do not require significant strength, such as trapping smaller animals. They and other scholars also note that there are cultures in which women do hunt large animals.

== History ==
George P. Murdock was one of the first scholars to describe this theory formally and with evidence. He did so in Social Forces in 1937.

== Criticism ==
Anthropologist Ernestine Friedl, writing in 1975, noted that while the great majority of hunters in hunter-gathering societies are men, with no such society preferring female hunters, the overlap between the women ranking highest in "size, running ability, muscular strength, lung capacity, and hormone-based aggressiveness" and the weakest or average male hunters was too great for these traits alone to account for it.

== See also ==
- Male expendability
- Economy-of-effort theory
- Division of labor
- Compatibility-with-childcare theory
