= Cannon fodder =

Combatants who are regarded as expendable

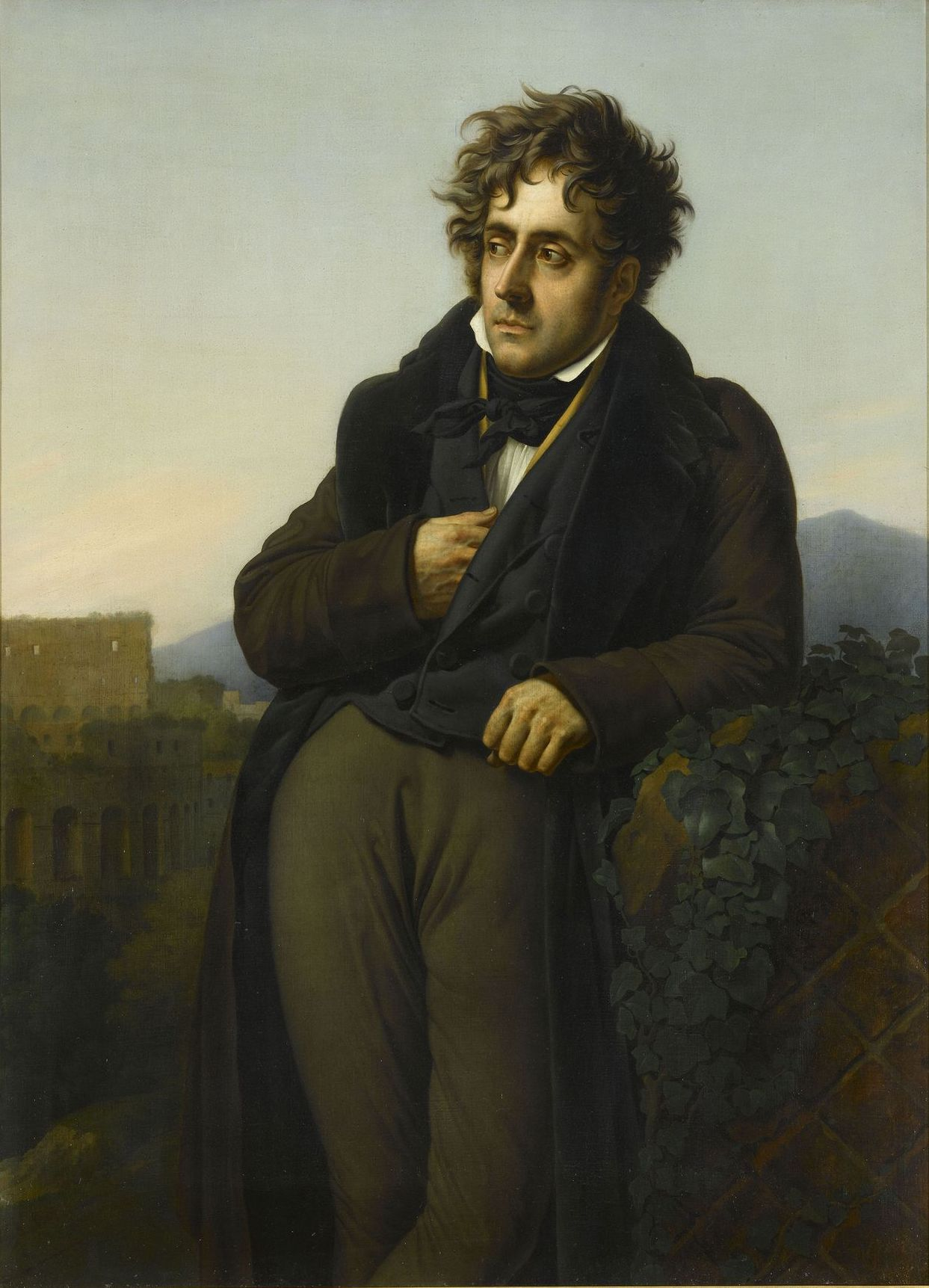
Chateaubriand, who wrote the first attested use of the expression

Cannon fodder is an informal, derogatory term for combatants who are regarded or treated by government or military command as expendable in the face of enemy fire. The term is generally used in situations where combatants are forced to fight against hopeless odds (with the foreknowledge that they will suffer extremely high casualties) in an effort to achieve a strategic goal; an example is the trench warfare of World War I. The term may also be used (somewhat pejoratively) to differentiate infantry from other forces (such as artillery troops, air force or the navy), or to distinguish expendable low-grade or inexperienced combatants from more militarily valuable veterans.

The term derives from fodder, as food for livestock. Soldiers are the metaphorical food for enemy cannon fire.

== Etymology ==
The concept of soldiers as fodder, as nothing more than "food" to be consumed by battle, dates back to at least the 16th century. For example, in William Shakespeare's play Henry IV, Part 1 there is a scene where Prince Henry ridicules John Falstaff's pitiful group of soldiers. Falstaff replies to Prince Henry with cynical references to gunpowder and tossing bodies into mass grave pits, saying that his men are "good enough to toss; food for powder, food for powder; they'll fill a pit as well as better [men]...."

The first attested use of the expression "cannon fodder" is by a French writer, François-René de Chateaubriand. In his anti-Napoleonic pamphlet "De Bonaparte et des Bourbons", published in 1814, he criticized the cynical attitude towards recruits that prevailed in the end of Napoleon's reign: "On en était venu à ce point de mépris pour la vie des hommes et pour la France, d'appeler les conscrits la matière première et la chair à canon"—"the contempt for the lives of men and for France herself has come to the point of calling the conscripts 'the raw material' and 'the cannon fodder'."

The term appeared in an English translation of a story written by Hendrik Conscience, translated by Mrs. Egwitt and published in the Janesville Gazette, Wisconsin in 1854. It later appeared in The Morning Chronicle, London in 1861 and was popularized during World War I.

== See also ==
- Conscription and sexism
- Exploitation
- Insignificance
- Male expendability
- Occupational inequality

Military tactics/units

- Forlorn hope: an initial wave of assault troops expected to sustain high casualties while attacking a well-defended target.
- Human shield: a situation in which the potential for civilian casualties deters attacks on a military target.
- Human wave attack: an assault in which a disproportionately large number of attackers is intended to overwhelm a well-defended target.
- Penal military unit: a combat formation composed of either personnel sentenced under military law, or civilian convicts who have volunteered or been drafted into military service.
- Shock troops: infantry at the forefront of an attack.
- Suicide attack: an attack in which the self-actuated death of the attacker serves to inflict enemy casualties as well (bombing, Kamikaze etc.).
- Total war – Conflict in which all of a nation's resources are deployed

Other cultural analogs

- Charge of the Light Brigade, where soldiers fought bravely despite facing a near certain death.
- The play Oh, What a Lovely War!, devised by Joan Littlewood's Theatre Workshop, and in particular the dialogue given to Douglas Haig, is centred on this theme.
- Redshirt, a fictional character whose sole purpose is to die soon after being introduced.
- Sacrificial lamb, someone who is sacrificed for the common good.
- Camp body, preseason players on National Football League team rosters. Used mainly to fill out the team and eat up playing time late in games (thus minimizing injury risk to veteran and valuable drafted players), and who have little chance of making the cuts onto the final roster.
