= Male expendability =

Hypothesis in anthropology

Male expendability, the relative expendability argument, or the expendable male hypothesis, is the idea that the lives of male humans are of less concern to a population than those of female humans because they are less necessary for population replacement. Since the 1970s, anthropologists have used the concept of male expendability to study polygyny, matrilinearity, and division of labor by gender role.

The concept comes from the idea that, from a reproductivity standpoint, one male may be able to impregnate or otherwise father offspring with many females. In humans, this would mean that a population with many reproducing women and few reproducing men would be able to grow more easily than a population with many reproducing men and few reproducing women.

== Origin ==
According to Carol Mukhopadhyay and Patricia Higgins, the concept of male expendability was first described by fellow anthropologist Ernestine Friedl in 1975, though she gave it no name at the time. Friedl noted that most hunter-gatherer and horticultural groups that she had studied for her book, Women and Men: An Anthropologist's View, gave the tasks of hunting and warfare to men, employing women very sparingly or not at all. She hypothesized that this could be because hunting and warfare required the men to be away at home for long, unpredictable periods, which was not compatible with the care of young children in which many women were heavily occupied and could be because fewer men would be needed to replenish the population, given that women in horticultural societies were limited to about one child every three years.

== Overview ==
The idea of male expendability in humans stems from the assumption that the biological differences in the roles of the sexes in procreation translate into societal differences in the level of bodily risk considered appropriate for men and women. In human reproduction, it requires far less time and energy for a man to produce sperm and semen and complete sexual intercourse than for a woman to complete pregnancy and childbirth. Male expendability takes the idea that one or a few men could therefore father children with many women, such that a given population could still grow if it had many child-bearing women and only a few men, but not the other way around. Anthropologist Ernestine Friedl specifically cited the slow average reproductive rates of women in extant hunter-gatherer and horticultural societies of the 1970s (one child in three years) as a reason why this might be important.

Anthropologists note that "most societies in the ethnographic record" allow polygyny, in which a man may have more than one female partner but a woman may not or at least is not encouraged to have more than one male partner. In the male expendability model, it therefore makes sense for societies to assign the most dangerous jobs to men rather than to women. Anthropologists have used the idea of male expendability to study such subjects as polygyny, matrilineality, and division of labor by gender. Dundes, Streiff, and Streiff link the concept to a male fear of being obsolete in reproduction with inspiration from feminist philosopher Sara Ruddick.

== Theory and concept ==
Ivana Milojević argues that while patriarchy assigns the role of sex object to women, it assigns to men the role of violence object, with male expendability being corollary to the sexual objectification of women. Social psychologist Roy Baumeister argues that it is common within cultures that the most dangerous jobs are male dominated; job-related deaths are higher in those occupations. Men make up the great majority of construction workers, truck drivers, police, fire fighters, and armed service members. Baumeister also notes that some genetic studies indicate that, in prehistoric times, more men than women lived and died without ever reproducing. "It would be shocking if these vastly different reproductive odds for men and women failed to produce some personality differences," he said in a 2007 speech at a psychology convention. Baumeister concludes in his book, "Most cultures see individual men as more expendable than individual women."

Anarcho-capitalist economist Walter Block argues in The Case for Discrimination that male expendability is the result of women being the bottleneck of reproductive capacity in a population.

== Examples ==
Norwegian sociologist and scholar of men's studies Øystein Gullvåg Holter argues that the male-led Russian government's belief in male expendability contributed to their delay in seeking international help during the Kursk submarine disaster, in which an all-male crew of 118 personnel died. He states, "If 118 women had been killed, alarm bells regarding discrimination against women would probably have gone off around the world." He states that able-bodied males were viewed as more legitimate targets during wars in Bosnia, Kosovo, Timor, Rwanda, and Chechnya.

== See also ==
- Androcide
- Attrition warfare
- Bateman's principle
- Compatibility-with-childcare theory
- Conscription and sexism
- Discrimination against men
- Economy-of-effort theory
- Lost boys (Mormon fundamentalism)
- Misandry
- Missing white woman syndrome
- Reverse sexism
- Sexual division of labour
- Strength theory
- Women and children first
- Women-are-wonderful effect
