= Man =

Male adult human

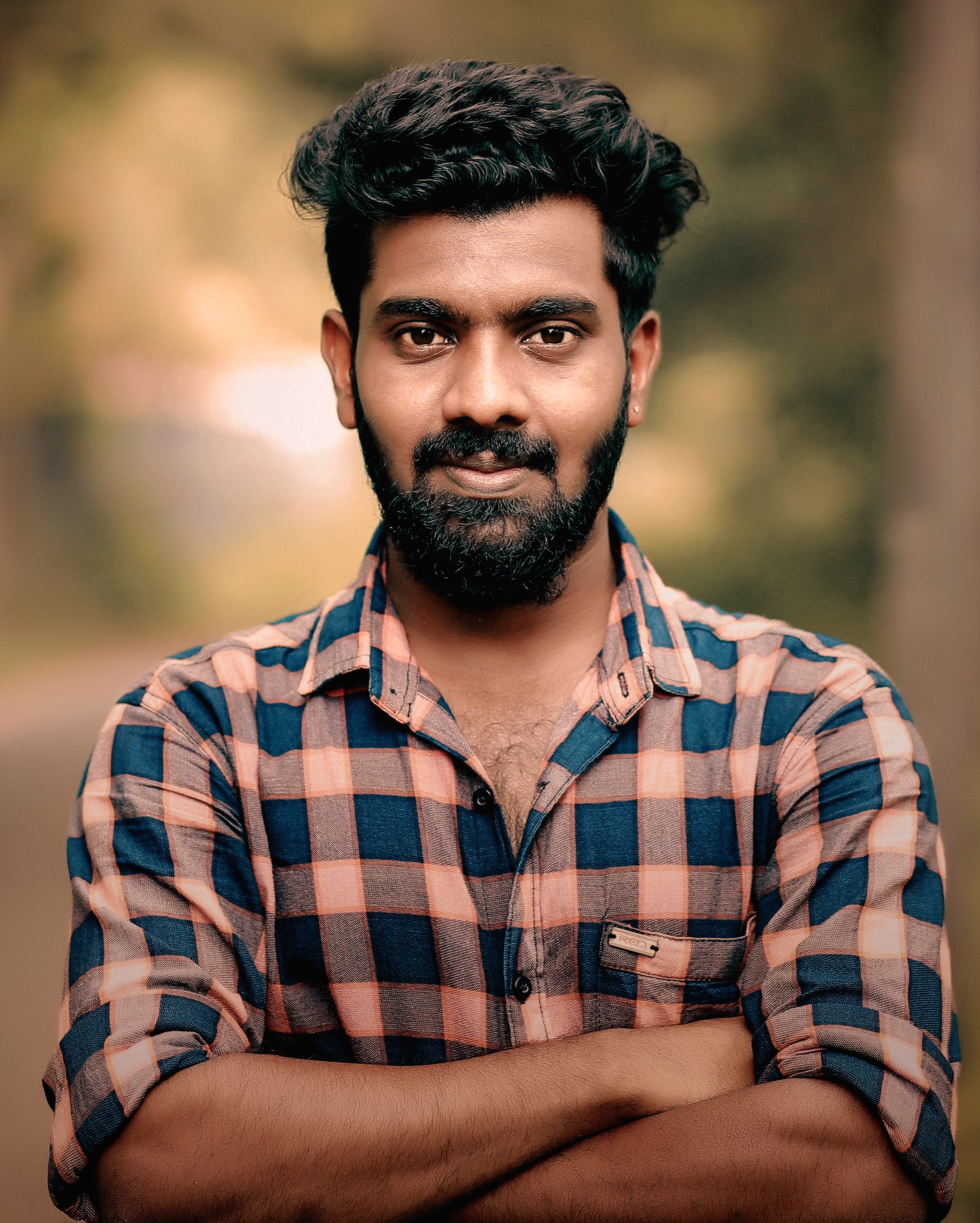
A man

A man is an adult male human. (Note: Male may refer to sex or gender. The plural men is sometimes used in certain phrases such as men's studies to denote male humans regardless of age.) Before adulthood, a male child or adolescent is referred to as a boy.

Like most other male mammals, a man's genome usually inherits an X chromosome from the mother and a Y chromosome from the father. Sex differentiation of the male fetus is governed by the SRY gene on the Y chromosome. During puberty, hormones which stimulate androgen production result in the development of secondary sexual characteristics that result in even more differences between the sexes. These include greater muscle mass, greater height, the growth of facial hair, and a lower body fat composition. Male anatomy is distinguished from female anatomy by the male reproductive system, which includes the testicles, sperm ducts, prostate gland and epididymides, and penis. Secondary sex characteristics include a narrower pelvis and hips, and smaller breasts and nipples.

Throughout human history, traditional gender roles have often defined masculinity and men's activities and opportunities, furthering the prevalence of patriarchal society. This makes men have considerable privileges and power, particularly over women, enforcing stringent masculine dominance and hierarchies throughout society. Men are over-represented as both perpetrators and victims of violence. Men are often directed into professions with high mortality rates. Men mostly face conscription into military service. Many religious doctrines stipulate certain rules for men, such as religious circumcision. Critique of the impact of these roles has produced changes toward gender equality, and has been addressed by the diverse men's movement.

Trans men have a gender identity that does not align with their female sex assignment at birth, while intersex men may have sex characteristics that do not fit typical notions of male biology.

== Etymology ==
The English term "man" is derived from the Proto-Indo-European root *man- (see Sanskrit/Avestan manu-, Slavic mǫž "man, male"). More directly, the word derives from Old English mann. The Old English form primarily meant "person" or "human being" and referred to men, women, and children alike. The Old English word for "man" as distinct from "wif"/"woman" or "child" was wer. Mann only came to mean "man" in Middle English, replacing wer, which survives today only in the compounds "werewolf" (from Old English werwulf, literally "man-wolf"), and "wergild", literally "man-payment".

== Biology ==
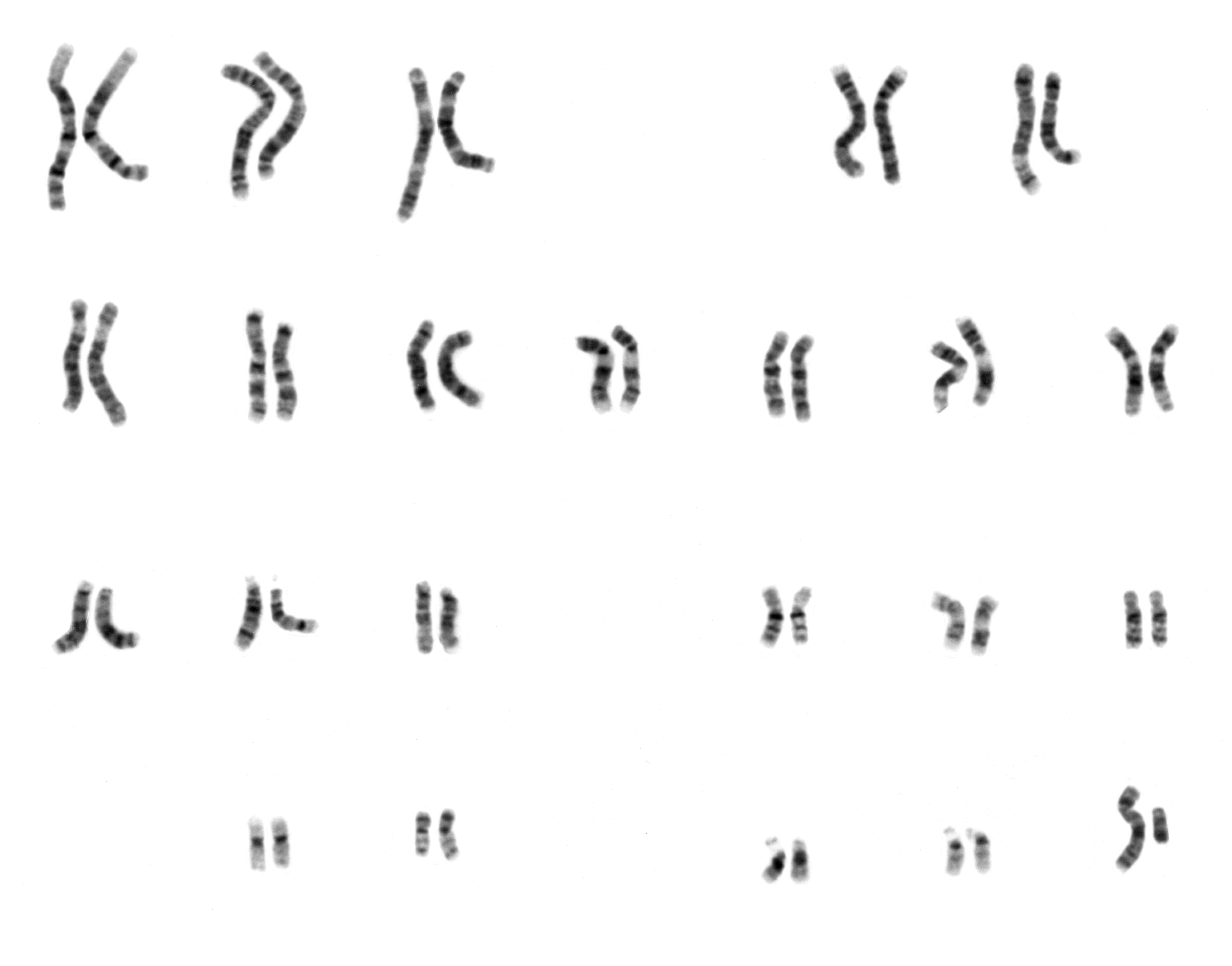
Karyogram of a human male using Giemsa staining. Human males typically possess an XY combination.

In humans, sperm cells carry either an X or a Y sex chromosome. If a sperm cell carrying a Y chromosome fertilizes the female ovum, the offspring will have a male karyotype (XY). The SRY gene is typically found on the Y chromosome and causes the development of the testes, which in turn govern other aspects of male sex differentiation. Sex differentiation in males proceeds in a testes-dependent way while female differentiation is not gonad dependent.

Primary sex characteristics (or sex organs) are characteristics that are present at birth and are integral to the reproductive process. For men, primary sex characteristics include the penis and testicles.

Adult humans exhibit sexual dimorphism in many other characteristics, many of which have no direct link to reproductive ability. Humans are sexually dimorphic in body size, body structure, and body composition. Men tend to be taller and heavier than women, and adjusted for height, men tend to have greater lean and bone mass than women, and lower fat mass.

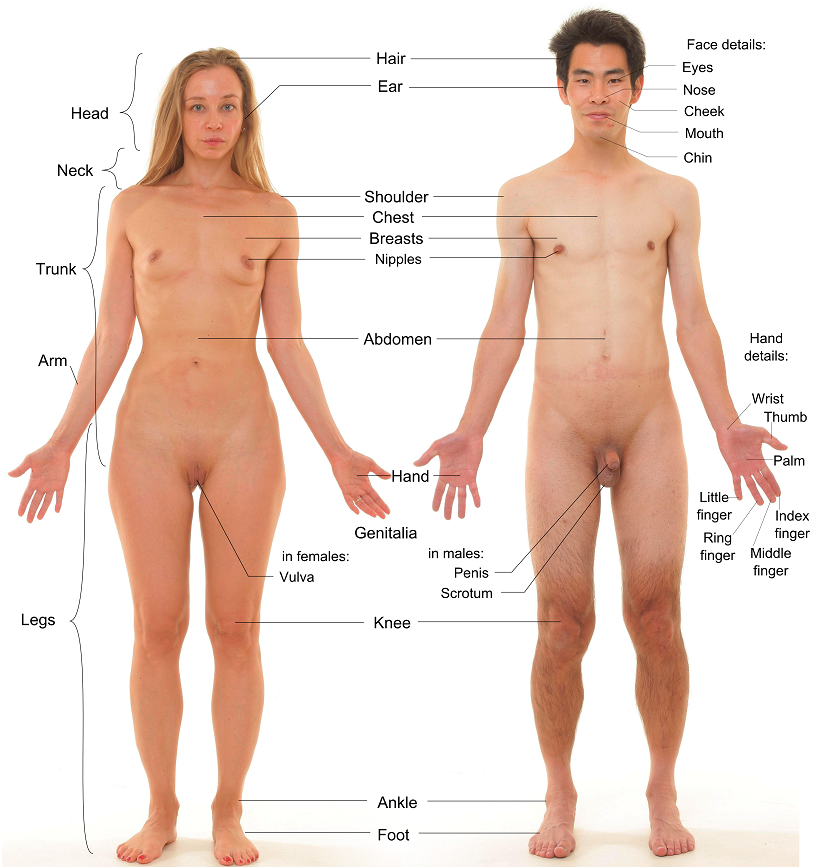
Photograph of an adult male human (right), with an adult female for comparison. The pubic hair of both models is removed.

Secondary sex characteristics are features that appear during puberty in humans. Such features are especially evident in the sexually dimorphic phenotypic traits that distinguish between the sexes, but—unlike the primary sex characteristics—are not directly part of the reproductive system. Secondary sexual characteristics that are specific to men include:

- Broadened shoulders;
- Increased body hair;
- An enlarged larynx (also known as an Adam's apple); and
- A voice that is significantly deeper than the voice of a child or a woman.

Men weigh more than women. On average, men are taller than women by about 10%. On average, men have a larger waist in comparison to their hips (see waist–hip ratio) than women. In women, the index and ring fingers tend to be either more similar in size or their index finger is slightly longer than their ring finger, whereas men's ring finger tends to be longer.

=== Reproductive system ===
A lateral cutaway of the human male lower abdomen, showing the human male reproductive system anatomy

The internal male genitalia consist of the testicles, which produce sperm, the accessory glands, which produce seminal fluid, the epididymides, which store sperm cells, and the vasa deferentia and ejaculatory ducts, which transfer the mature sperm to the urethra.

The external male genitalia consist of the penis and the scrotum, a pouch of skin housing the testicles.

Sperm cells are ejaculated in semen through the penis and enter the female reproductive tract through the vagina. Sperm that pass from the vagina to the uterus can enter the fallopian tubes and fertilize an egg, which develops into an embryo. The study of male reproduction and associated organs is called andrology.

Testosterone stimulates the development of the Wolffian ducts, the penis, and closure of the labioscrotal folds into the scrotum. Another significant hormone in sexual differentiation is the anti-Müllerian hormone, which inhibits the development of the Müllerian ducts. For males during puberty, testosterone, along with gonadotropins released by the pituitary gland, stimulates spermatogenesis.

=== Health ===
Men have a shorter life expectancy than women in all countries, and across all age groups, for which reliable records exist. One reason are armed conflicts, where men are often the immediate victims. A study of conflicts in 13 countries from 1955 to 2002 found that 81% of all violent war deaths were male. Apart from armed conflicts, areas with high incidence of violence, such as regions controlled by drug cartels, also see men experiencing higher mortality rates. A retrospective analyses of people infected with the common cold found that doctors underrate the symptoms of men, and are more willing to attribute symptoms and illness to women than men. In the United States, men are less healthy than women across all social classes. Non-white men are especially unhealthy. Men are over-represented in dangerous occupations and represent a majority of on the job deaths. Further, medical doctors provide men with less service, less advice, and spend less time with men than they do with women per medical encounter. Victim blaming contributes to men's mental health issues.

== Sexuality ==
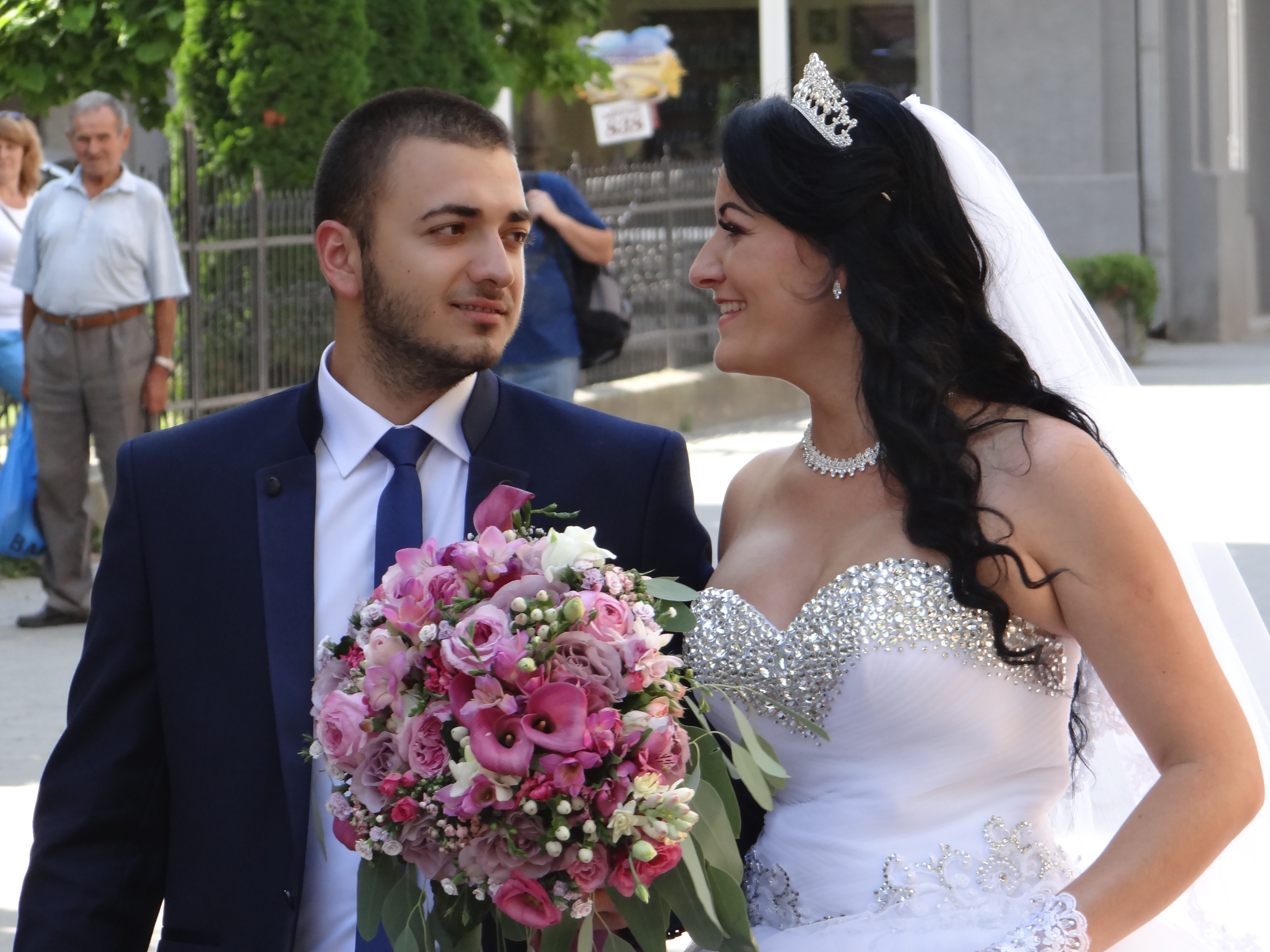
Most men are heterosexual and cisgender

Male sexuality and attraction varies between individuals, and a man's sexual behavior can be affected by many factors, including evolved predispositions, personality, upbringing, and culture. While most men are heterosexual, significant minorities are homosexual or bisexual.

== Sex or gender identity ==
Most cultures use a gender binary in which man is one of the two genders, the other being woman.

Most men are cisgender, and their gender identity aligns with their male sex assignment at birth. Trans men have a male gender identity that does not align with their female sex assignment at birth, and may undergo masculinizing hormone replacement therapy and/or sex reassignment surgery. Intersex men may have sex characteristics that do not fit typical notions of male biology. A 2016 systemic review estimated that 0.256% of people self-identify as female-to-male transgender. A 2017 survey of 80,929 Minnesota students found that roughly twice as many female-assigned adolescents self-identified as transgender, compared to adolescents with a male sex assignment.

== Social role ==
=== Masculinity ===
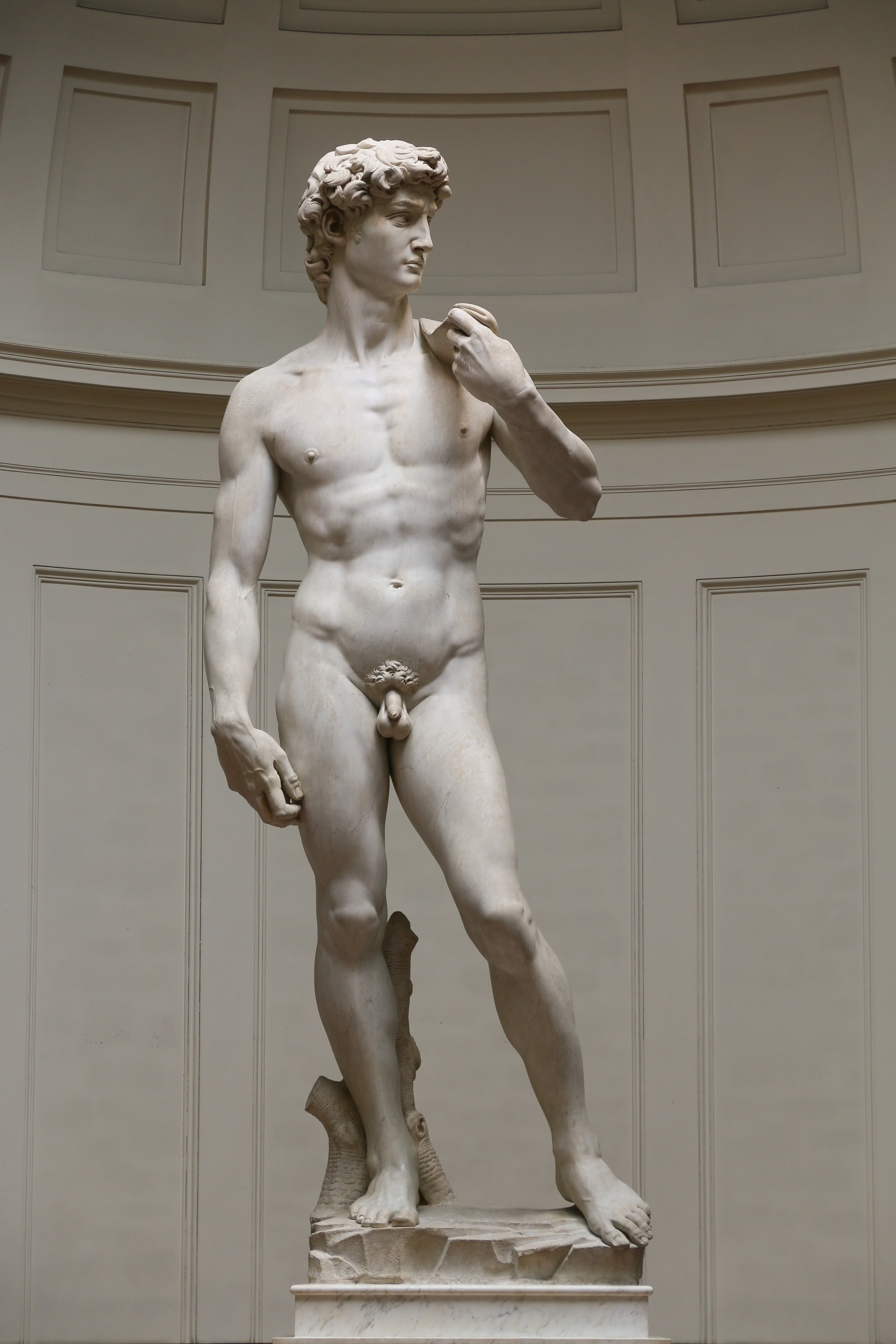
Michelangelo's David is the classical image of youthful male beauty in Western art.

Masculinity (also sometimes called manhood or manliness) is the set of personality traits and attributes associated with boys and men. Manhood is the embodiment of qualities seen as associated with mature masculinity; it is related to adulthood and may be distinguished from boyhood. Although masculinity is socially constructed, some research indicates that some behaviors considered masculine are biologically influenced. To what extent masculinity is biologically or socially influenced is subject to debate. It is distinct from the definition of the biological male sex, as both males and females can exhibit masculine traits. Men generally face social stigma for embodying feminine traits, more so than women do for embodying masculine traits. This can also manifest as homophobia.

Standards of manliness or masculinity vary across different cultures and historical periods. While the outward signs of masculinity look different in different cultures, there are some common aspects to its definition across cultures. In all cultures in the past, and still among traditional and non-Western cultures, getting married is the most common and definitive distinction between boyhood and manhood. In the late 20th century, some qualities traditionally associated with marriage (such as the "triple Ps" of protecting, providing, and procreating) were still considered signs of having achieved manhood.

=== Relationships ===
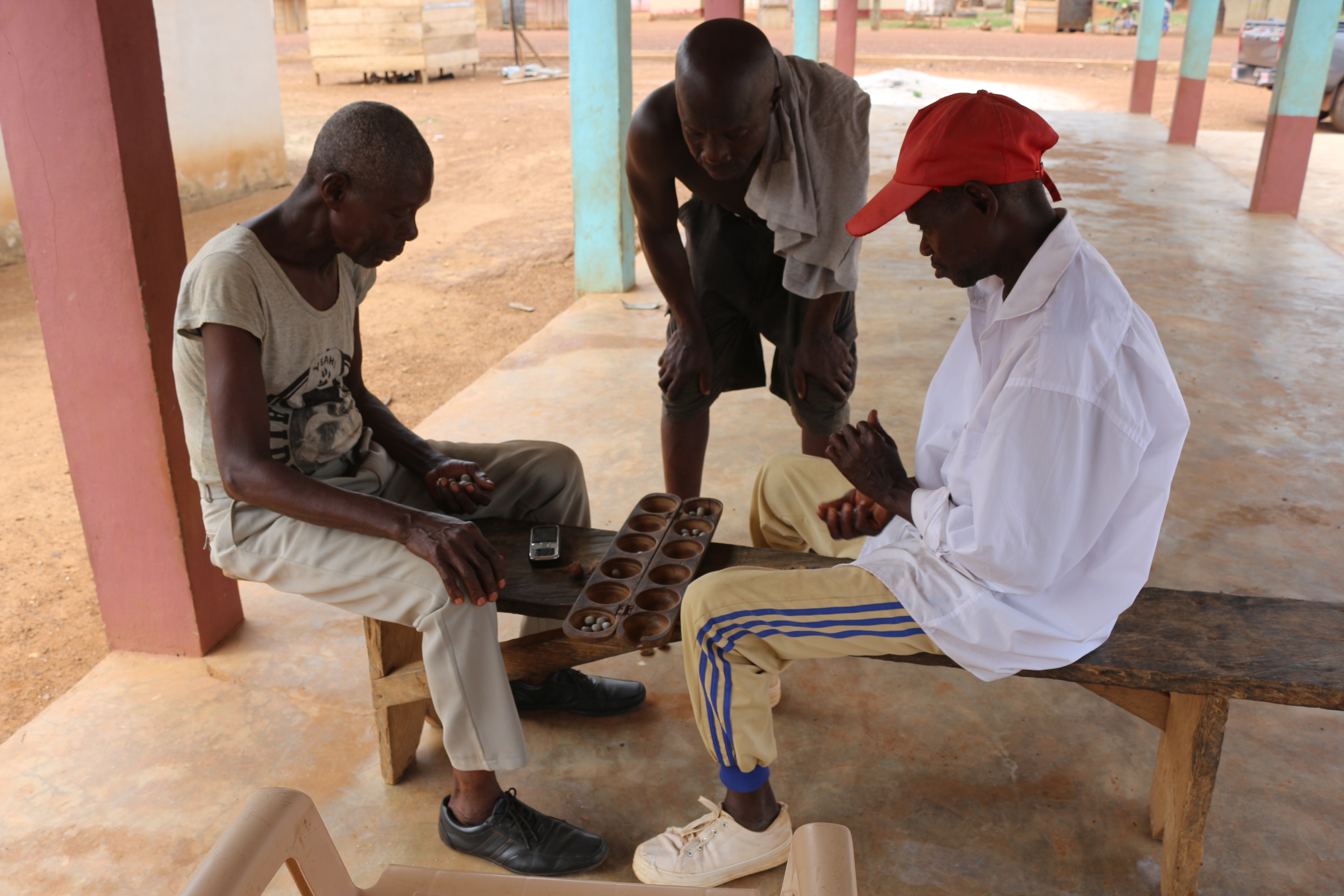
Two men playing a board game

Platonic relationships are not significantly different between men and women, though some differences do exist. Friendships involving men tend to be based more on shared activities than self-disclosure and personal connection. Perceptions of friendship involving men varies among cultures and time periods. In heterosexual romantic relationships, men are typically expected to take a proactive role, initiate the relationship, plan dates, and propose marriage.

=== Status ===
Anthropology has shown that masculinity itself has social status, just like wealth, race, and social class. In Western culture, for example, greater masculinity usually brings greater social status. Many English words such as virtue and virile (from the Indo-European root vir meaning man) reflect this. In most cultures, male privilege allows men more rights and privileges than women. In societies where men are not given special legal privileges, they typically hold more positions of power, and men are seen as being taken more seriously in society. This is associated with a "gender-role strain" in which men face increased societal pressure to conform to gender roles.

== History ==
The earliest known recorded name of a man in writing is potentially Kushim, who would have lived sometime between 3400 and 3000 BC in the Sumerian city of Uruk. However, "Kushim" may have been a title rather than his actual name. The earliest confirmed names are that of Gal-Sal and his two slaves named En-pap X and Sukkalgir, from c. 3100 BC.

== Fatherhood ==
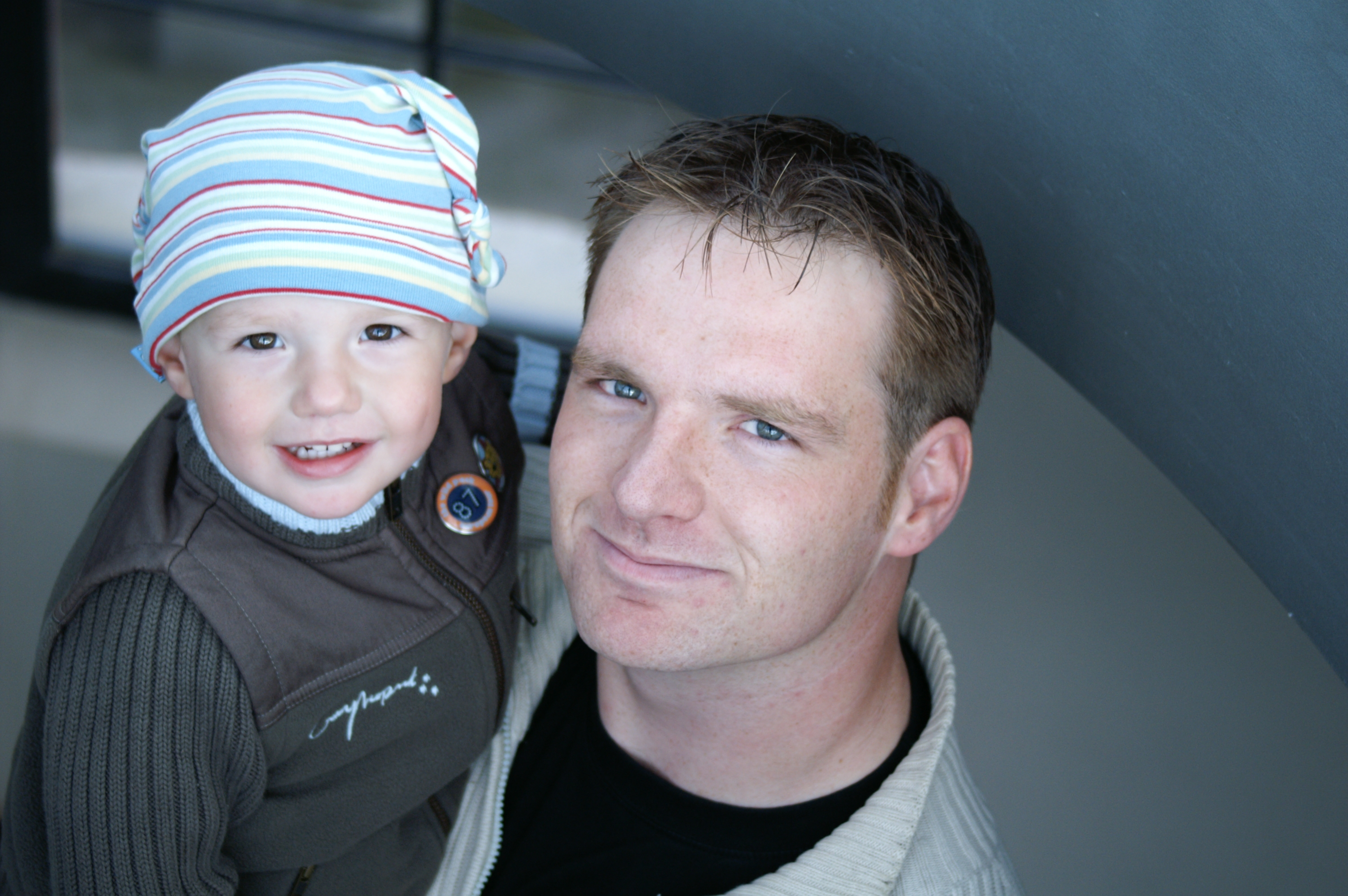
A father and his son

Men may have children, whether biological or adopted; such men are called fathers. The role of men in the family has shifted considerably in the 20th and 21st centuries, taking on a more active role in raising children in most societies. Men would traditionally marry a woman when raising children, but in modern times many countries now allow for same-sex marriage, and for those couples to raise children either via adoption or surrogacy. Men may be single parents, and are increasingly so in modern times, though women are three times more likely to be single parents than men. In paternal societies, men were typically regarded as the "head of household" and held additional social privileges.

== Work ==
Men have traditionally held jobs that were not available to women. Such jobs tended to be either more strenuous, more prestigious, or more dangerous. Modern men increasingly take untraditional career paths, such as staying home and raising children while their partner works. Modern men tend to work longer than women, which impacts their ability to spend time with their families. Even in modern times, some jobs remain available only to men, such as military service. Conscription is overwhelmingly discriminatory; currently only ten countries include women in their conscription programs. Men continue to hold more dangerous jobs than women, even in developed countries. In the United States in 2020, ten times as many men died on the job as women.

== Entertainment and media ==
Media portrayals of men often replicate traditional understanding of masculinity. Men are portrayed more frequently in television than women and most commonly appear as leads in action and drama programming. Men are typically more active in television programming than women and typically hold more power and status. Due to their prominence, men are more likely to be both the objects and instigators of humorous or disparaging content. Fathers are often portrayed in television as either idealized and caring or clumsy and inept. In advertising, men are disproportionately featured in advertisements for alcohol, vehicles, sports, and business products.

== Clothing ==
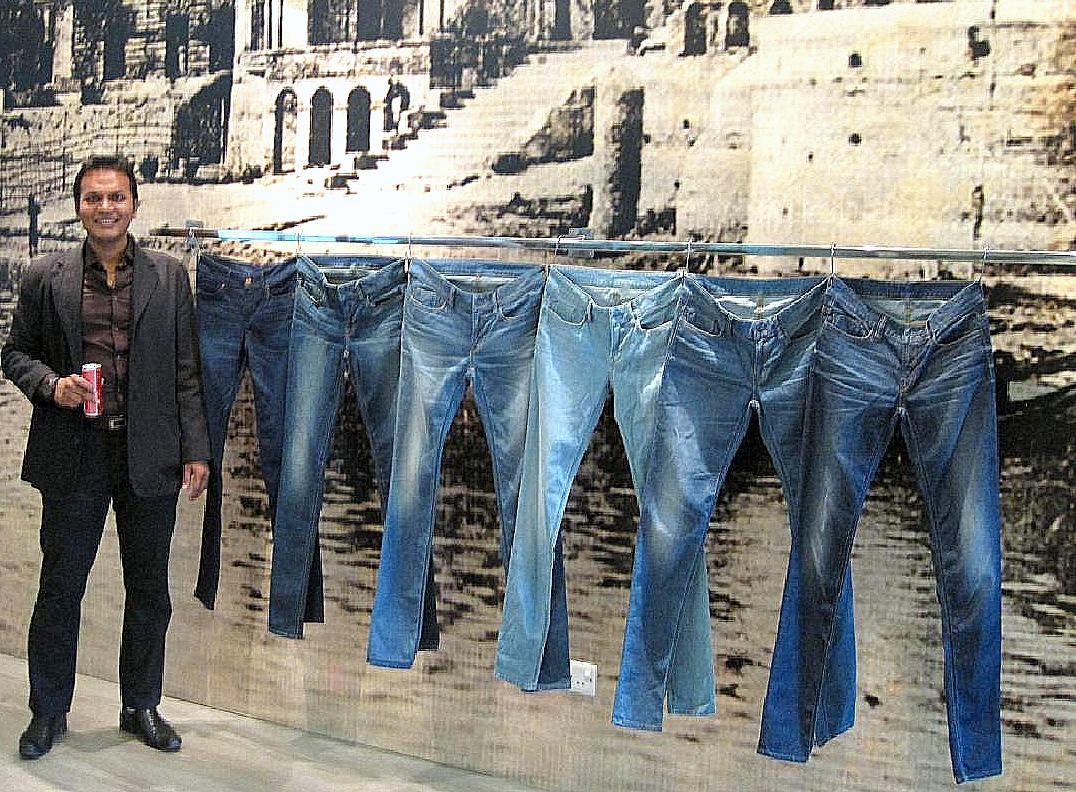
A man wearing a business suit stands next to a display of men's blue jeans at a clothing factory.

Men's clothing typically encompasses a range of garments designed for various occasions, seasons, and styles. Fundamental items of a man's wardrobe include shirts, trousers, suits, neckties, bow ties, and jackets, which are designed to provide both comfort and style while prioritizing functionality. Men's fashion also encompasses more casual garments such as t-shirts, sweatshirts, jeans, shorts, and swimwear, which are typically intended for informal settings. Cultural and regional traditions often influence men's fashion, resulting in diverse styles and garments that reflect the characteristics of different parts of the world.

== Education ==
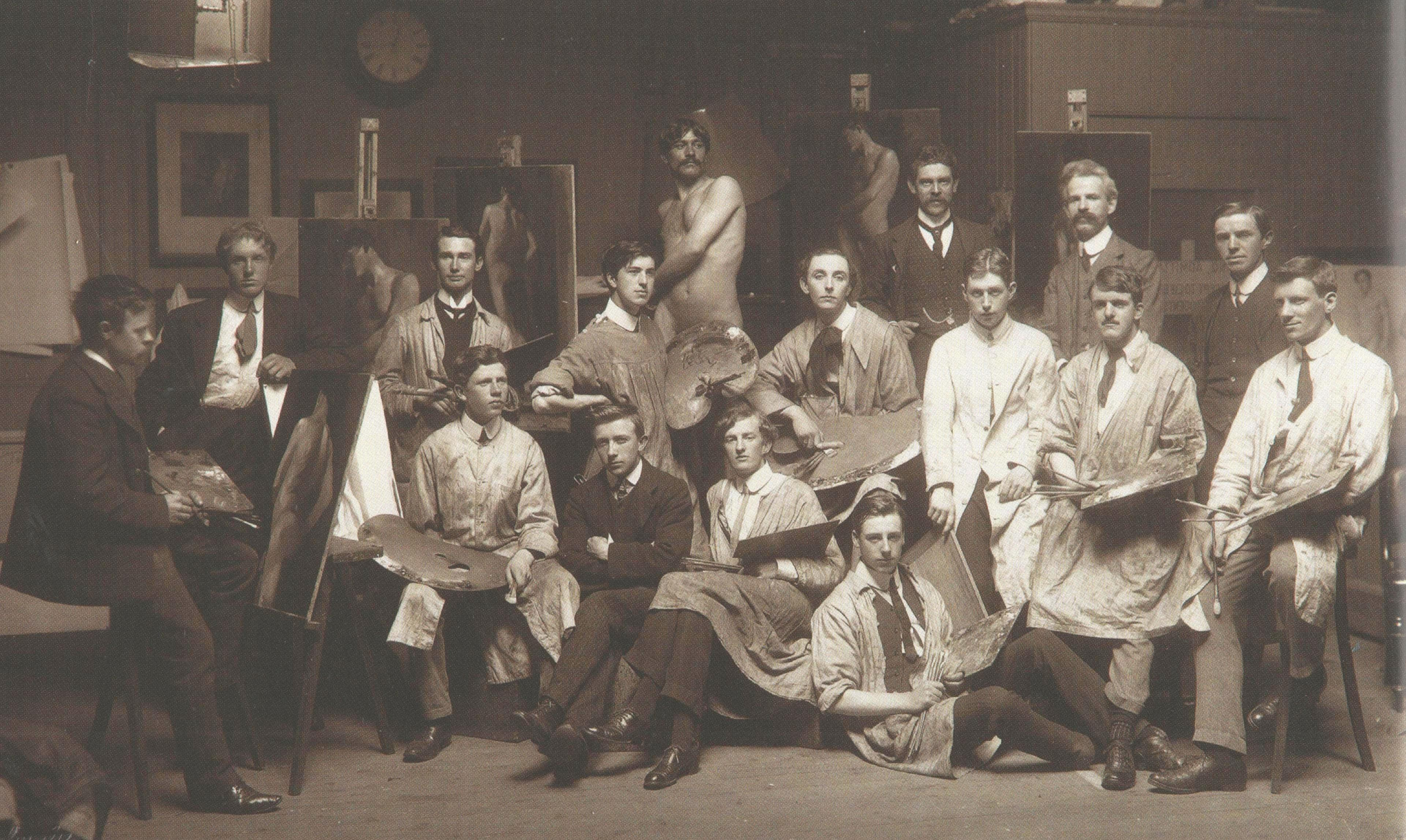
An all-male figure drawing class in 1908 at Edinburgh College of Art

Men traditionally received more education than women as a result of single-sex education. Universal education, meaning state-provided primary and secondary education independent of gender, is not yet a global norm, even if it is assumed in most developed countries. In the 21st century, the balance has shifted in many developed nations, and men now lag behind women in education.

Men are more likely than women to be faculty at universities.

In 2020, 90% of the world's men were literate, compared to 87% of women. But sub-Saharan Africa, and southwest Asia lagged behind the rest of the world; only 72% of men in sub-Saharan Africa were literate.

== Rights ==
In most societies, men have more legal and cultural rights than women, and misogyny is far more prevalent than misandry in society. However, there are exceptions to this generalization. While one in six males experience childhood sexual abuse, men typically receive less support after being victims of it, and rape of males is stigmatized. Domestic violence against men is similarly stigmatized, although men make up half of the victims in heterosexual couples. Opponents of circumcision describe it as a human rights violation. The fathers' rights movement seeks to support separated fathers that do not receive equal rights to care for their children. The men's movement is the response to issues faced by men in Western countries. It includes pro-feminist groups such as the men's liberation movement, and anti-feminist groups such as the manosphere.

== Gender symbol ==
The Mars symbol (♂) is a common symbol that represents the male sex. The symbol is identical to the planetary symbol of Mars. It was first used to denote sex by Carl Linnaeus in 1751. The symbol is sometimes seen as a stylized representation of the shield and spear of the Roman god Mars. According to Stearn, however, this derivation is "fanciful" and all the historical evidence favours "the conclusion of the French classical scholar Claude de Saumaise" that it is derived from θρ, the contraction of a Greek epithet for Mars, θοῦρος (Thouros).

== See also ==
- International Men's Day
- International Men's Health Week
- Lists of men
- Men's studies
- Patriarchy
- Sexism

== Bibliography ==
- Helgeson, Vicki S. (2017). Psychology of Gender (5th ed.). Routledge. ISBN 978-1-138-18687-3.
