= Sexual division of labour =

Delegation of different tasks between males and females

Sexual division of labour (SDL) is the delegation of different tasks between the male and female members of a species. Among human hunter-gatherer societies, males and females are responsible for the acquisition of different types of foods and shared them with each other for a mutual or familial benefit. In some species, males and females eat slightly different foods, while in other species, males and females will routinely share food; but only in humans are these two attributes combined. The few remaining hunter-gatherer populations in the world serve as evolutionary models that can help explain the origin of the sexual division of labour. Many studies on the sexual division of labour have been conducted on hunter-gatherer populations, such as the Hadza, a hunter-gatherer population of Tanzania. In modern day society, sex differences in occupation is seen across cultures, with the tendency that men do technical work and women tend to do work related to care.

== Behavioral ecological perspective ==
Both men and women have the option of investing resources either to provision children or to have additional offspring. According to life history theory, males and females monitor costs and benefits of each alternative to maximize reproductive fitness; however, trade-off differences do exist between sexes. Females are likely to benefit most from parental care effort because they are certain which offspring are theirs and have relatively few reproductive opportunities, each of which is relatively costly and risky. In contrast, males are less certain of paternity, but may have many more mating opportunities bearing relatively low costs and risks.

=== Hunting vs gathering ===
From the 1970s onward, the dominant paleontological perspective of gendered roles in hunter-gatherer societies was of a model termed "Man the Hunter, Woman the Gatherer." This model, coined by anthropologists Richard Borshay Lee and Irven DeVore in 1968, argued, based on evidence now thought to be incomplete, that contemporary foragers displayed a clear division of labour between women and men. However, an attempted verification of this study found "that multiple methodological failures all bias their results in the same direction...their analysis does not contradict the wide body of empirical evidence for gendered divisions of labor in foraging societies". The sexual division of labour may have arisen to allow humans to acquire food and other resources more efficiently. More recent evidence compiled by researchers such as Sarah Lacy and Cara Ocobock has found a lack of conclusive preferences for their role among both modern hunter gatherers, where "79 percent of the 63 foraging societies with clear descriptions of their hunting strategies feature women hunters," and among prehistoric societies such as those in Peru. Archaeological research done in 2006 by the anthropologist and archaeologist Steven Kuhn from the University of Arizona suggests that the sexual division of labour did not exist prior to the Upper Paleolithic and developed relatively recently in human history.

Notable hunter-gatherer groups in the recent or contemporary eras known to lack a distinct sexual division of labour include the Ainu, Agta, and Ju'/hoansi.

Anthropologist Rebecca Bird argued that natural selection is more likely to favor male reproductive strategies that stress mating effort and female strategies that emphasize parental investment. As a result, women do the low-risk task of gathering vegetation and underground storage organs that are rich in energy to provide for themselves and offspring. In the book Catching Fire: How Cooking Made Us Human British primatologist Richard Wrangham suggests that the origin of the division of labour between males and females may have originated with the invention of cooking, which is estimated to have happened simultaneously with humans gaining control of fire. A similar idea was proposed far earlier by Friedrich Engels in an unfinished essay from 1876.

== In modern human society ==
Sexual division of labour is observed globally, and across most cultures. In many societies the breadwinner–homemaker model has been a stable characteristic. The division is more pronounced in some fields of work than in others, generally, work outside, dangerous work and work in highly technical disciplines (typically STEM jobs with the exception of those related to health care) is more likely to be done by men, while work related to care and interpersonal relations is generally more likely to be done by women. The borders of the division are not generally stable, with some fields showing a reversal of the proportions, such as doctors. Some fields see an increasing segregation, positively correlated with the levels of egalitarian policies of the countries, known as the gender-equality paradox.

== Hypotheses for evolutionary origins ==
=== Provisioning household ===
The traditional explanation of the sexual division of labour finds that males and females cooperate within pair bonds by targeting different foods so that everyone in the household benefits. Females may target foods that do not conflict with reproduction and child care, while males will target foods that females do not gather, which increases variance in daily consumption and provides a broader diet for the family. Foraging specialization in particular food groups should increase skill level and thus foraging success rates for targeted foods.

=== Show-Off/Signaling hypothesis ===
The signaling hypothesis proposes that men hunt to gain social attention and mating benefits by widely sharing game. This model proposes that hunting functions mainly to provide an honest signal of the underlying genetic quality of hunters, which later yields a mating advantage or social deference. Women tend to target the foods that are most reliable, while men tend to target difficult-to-acquire foods to "signal" their abilities and genetic quality. Hunting is thus viewed as a form of mating or male-male status competition, not familial provisioning. Recent studies on the Hadza have revealed that men hunt mainly to distribute food to their own families rather than sharing it with other members of the community. This conclusion suggests evidence against hunting for signaling purposes.

=== The Victorian Period ===
The Victorian era has been closely examined by Sally Shuttleworth. Women played dual roles and were expected to deliver with conviction in the aspects in which they were required to perform duties in and outside of the household. Shuttleworth states, "two traditional tropes are here combined: Victorian medical textbooks demonstrated not only woman's biological fitness and adaptation to the sacred role of homemaker, but also her terrifying subjection to the forces of the body. At once angel and demon, woman came to represent both the civilizing power that would cleanse the male from contamination in the brutal world of the economic market and also the rampant, uncontrolled excesses of the material economy."

== SDL and optimal foraging theory ==
Optimal foraging theory states that organisms forage in such a way as to maximize their energy intake per unit time. In other words, animals behave in such a way as to find, capture, and consume food containing the most calories while expending the least amount of time possible in doing so. The sexual division of labour provides an appropriate explanation as to why males forgo the opportunity to gather any items with caloric value- a strategy that would seem suboptimal from an energetic standpoint. The optimal foraging theory suggests that the sexual division of labour is an adaptation that benefits the household; thus, foraging behavior of males will appear optimal at the level of the family. If a hunter-gatherer man does not rely on resources from others and passes up a food item with caloric value, it can be assumed that he is foraging at an optimal level. But, if he passes up the opportunity because it is a food that women routinely gather, then as long as men and women share their spoils, it will be optimal for men to forgo the collection and continue searching for different resources to complement the resources gathered by women.

== Cooking and the sexual division of labour ==
The emergence of cooking in early Homo may have created problems of food theft from women while food was being cooked. As a result, females would recruit male partners to protect them and their resources from others. This concept, known as the theft hypothesis, accommodates an explanation as to why the labour of cooking is strongly associated with the status of women. Women are forced to gather and cook foods because they will not acquire food otherwise and access to resources is critical for their reproductive success. On the contrary, men do not gather because their physical dominance allows them to scrounge cooked foods from women. Thus, women's foraging and food preparation efforts allow men to participate in the high-risk, high-reward activities of hunting. Females, in turn, become increasingly sexually attractive as a means to exploit male interest in investing in her protection.

== Evolution of sex differences ==
Many studies investigating the spatial abilities of men and women have found no significant differences, though meta studies show a male advantage in mental rotation and assessing horizontality and verticality, and a female advantage in spatial memory. The sexual division of labour has been proposed as an explanation for these cognitive differences. Those differences disappear with a short training or when given a favorable image of woman ability. Furthermore, differences between individuals are greater than average differences, therefore such differences are not a valid prediction of male or female cognitive ability. This hypothesis argues that males needed the ability to follow prey over long distances and to accurately target their game with projectile technology, and, as a result, male specialization in hunting prowess would have spurred the selection for increased spatial and navigational ability. Similarly, the ability to remember the locations of underground storage organs and other vegetation would have led to an increase in overall efficiency and decrease in total energy expenditure since the time spent searching for food would decrease. Natural selection based on behaviors that increase hunting success and energetic efficiency would bear a positive influence on reproductive success. However, recent research suggests that the sexual division of labour developed relatively recently and that gender roles were not always the same in early-human cultures, contradicting the theory that each sex is naturally predisposed to different types of work.

Sexual division of labour continues to be a debated topic within anthropology. Gerda Lerner quotes the philosopher Socrates to argue that the idea of defined gender roles is patriarchal. It also identifies how men and women are capable of performing the same job descriptions with the exception of when it calls for anatomical differences, such as giving birth.

"In Book V of the Republic, Plato—in the voice of Socrates—sets down the conditions for the training of the guardians, his elite leadership group. Socrates proposes that women should have the same opportunity as men to be trained as guardians. In support of this he offers a strong statement against making sex differences the basis for discrimination: if the difference [between men and women] consists only in women bearing and men begetting children, this does not amount to proof that a woman differs from a man in respect to the sort of education she should receive; and we shall therefore continue to maintain that our guardians and their wives ought to have the same pursuits."

He continues to add that with the same set of established resources such as education, training and teaching, it creates an atmosphere of equity which helps to further the cause of gender equality.

"Socrates proposes the same education for boys and girls, freeing guardian women from housework and child-care. But this female equality of opportunity will serve a larger purpose: the destruction of the family. Plato's aim is to abolish private property, the private family, and with it self-interest in his leadership group, for he sees clearly that private property engenders class antagonism and disharmony. Therefore men and women are to have a common way of life. . . —common education, common children; and they are to watch over the citizens in common."

Some researchers, such as Cordelia Fine, argue that available evidence does not support a biological basis for gender roles.

=== Evolutionary perspective ===
Based on the contemporary theories and research on the sexual division of labour, four critical aspects of hunter‐gatherer socioecology led to the evolutionary origin of the SDL in humans: (1) long‐term dependency on high‐cost offspring, (2) optimal dietary mix of mutually exclusive foods, (3) efficient foraging based on specialized skill, and (4) sex‐differentiated comparative advantage in tasks. These combined conditions are rare in nonhuman vertebrates but common to currently-existing populations of human foragers, which, thus, gives rise to a potential factor for the evolutionary divergence of social behaviors in Homo.

== See also ==
- Division of labour
- Hunter-gatherer
- Evolution
- Compatibility with childcare
- Economy-of-effort theory
- Strength theory
- Adaptation
- Male expendability
- Natural selection
- Gender roles
