= Compatibility-with-childcare theory =

Hypothesis in anthropology

The compatibility-with-childcare theory is an idea in anthropology and gender studies. Scholars use it to explain why some cultures assign some forms of work to women and other forms of work to men (or some other gender role recognized by that culture). In cultures that assign the care of young children to women, other roles given to women must not involve traveling long distances away from those children for extended or unpredictable periods. For example, hunter-gatherer and horticultural societies assign the hunting of large game almost exclusively to men. Anthropologist Ernestine Friedl hypothesized that this could be because women take primary responsibility for the care of young children, and the long and unpredictable absences and long distances involved in this type of hunting would make that prohibitively difficult.

== See also ==
- Male expendability
- Division of labor
- Economy-of-effort theory
- Strength theory
