= Destruction under the Mongol Empire =

Impact of the 13th-century Mongol conquests

- Part of the Mongol conquests
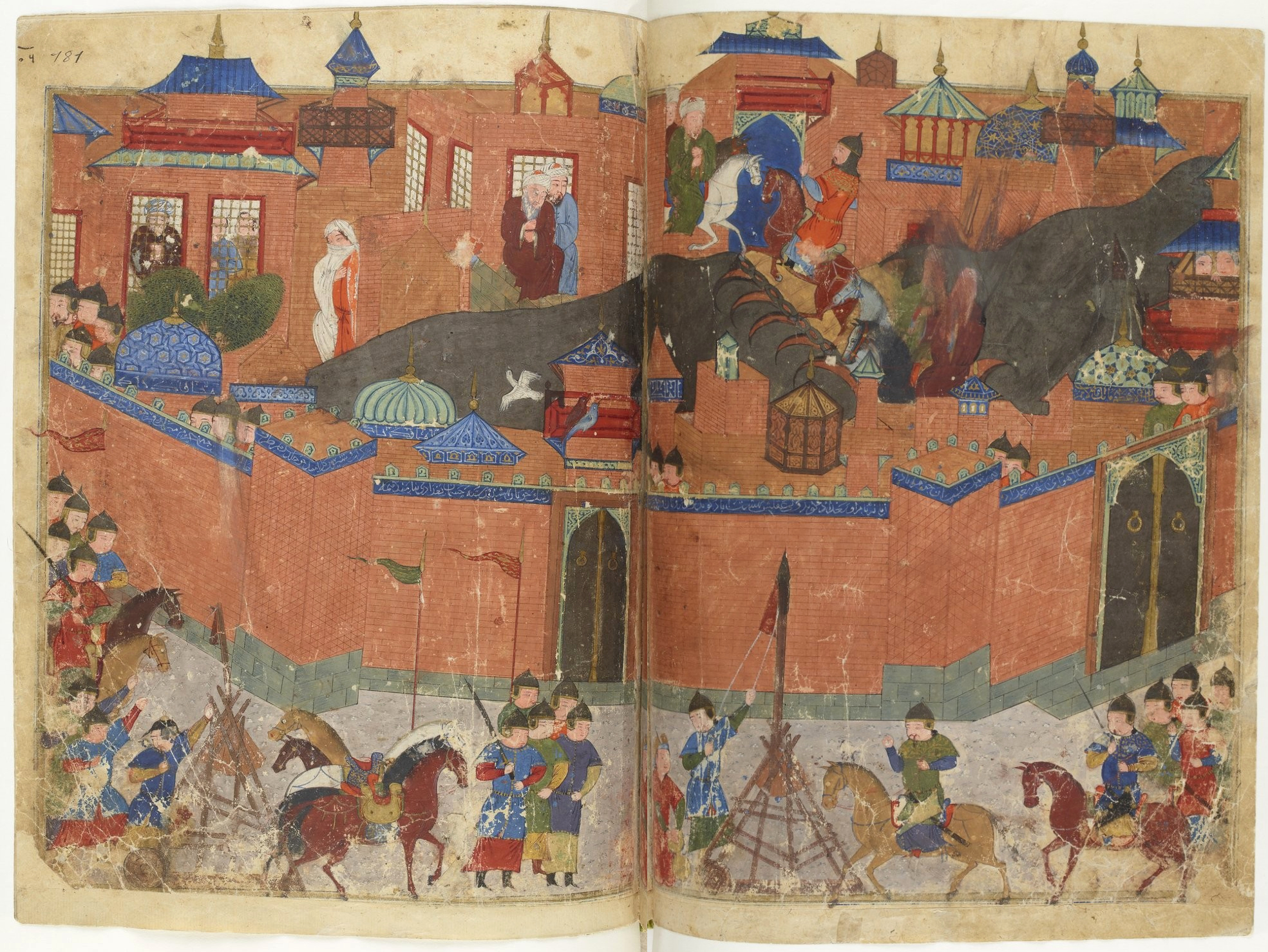
- Depiction of the Siege of Baghdad in February 1258, when the Mongol army killed roughly 200,000 people throughout the city and devastated the Abbasid Caliphate within Mesopotamia
- Location: Eurasia
- Date: 1206–1368
- Attack type: Massacre, famine, genocide, androcide
- Deaths: Debated, see § Demographic changes
- Perpetrator: Mongol Empire

The Mongol conquests resulted in widespread and well-documented death and destruction throughout Eurasia, as the Mongol army invaded hundreds of cities and killed millions of people. As such, the Mongol Empire, which remains the largest contiguous polity ever to have existed, is regarded as having perpetrated some of the deadliest acts of mass killing in human history.

More recently, the Mongol Empire's conquests have been classified as genocidal. For example, British historian John Joseph Saunders described Mongol troops as "the most notorious practitioners of genocide".

== Strategy ==
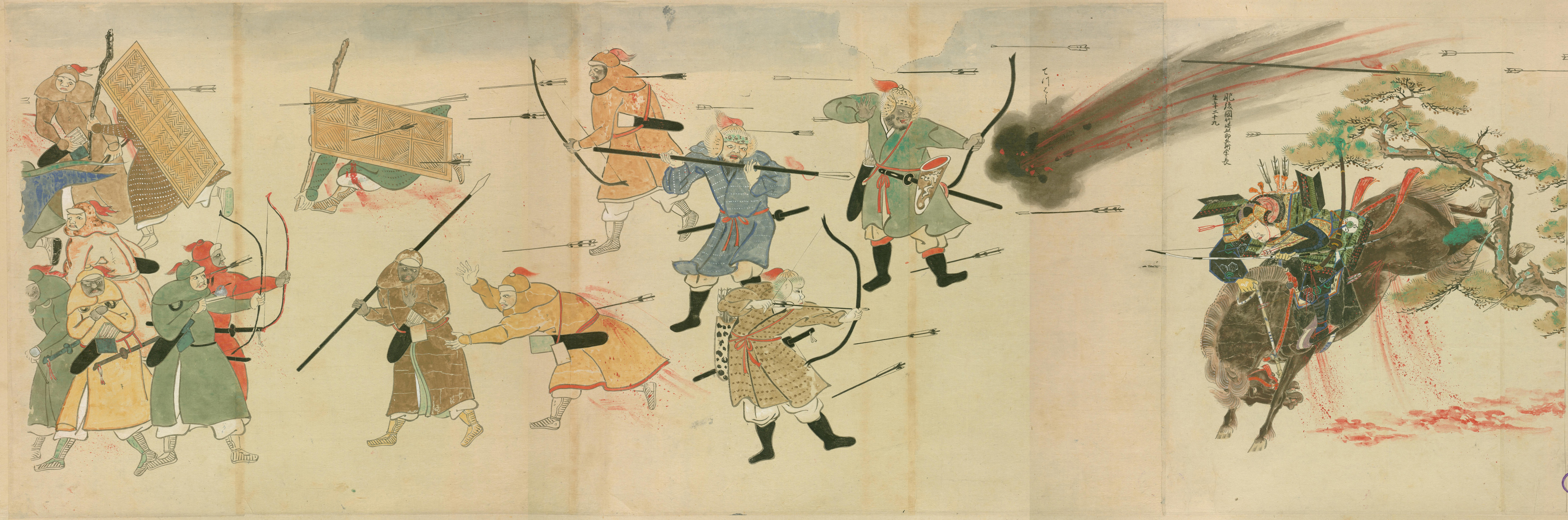
Invasion of Japan against samurai Takezaki Suenaga using arrows and bombs, circa 1293.

Genghis Khan and his generals preferred to offer their enemies a chance to surrender without resistance. These enemies would then become vassals by sending tribute, accepting Mongol residents, and/or contributing troops. In return, the Khan would guarantee their protection, but only if those who submitted to Mongol rule were obedient. Those who agreed to pay the Mongols tribute were spared invasion and left relatively independent. While populations resisting were usually annihilated and so did not pay a regular tribute, exceptions to the rule included the Goryeo dynasty of Korea, which finally agreed to pay regular tributes in exchange for vassaldom and some measure of autonomy as well as the retention of the ruling dynasty, further emphasizing the Mongol preference for tribute and vassals, which would serve as a somewhat regular and continuous source of income, as opposed to outright conquest and destruction. Different tributes were taken from different cultures. For instance, Goryeo was assessed at 10,000 otter skins, 20,000 horses, 10,000 bolts of silk, clothing for soldiers, and large numbers of children and artisans as slaves.

If the enemy offered any resistance, what followed were massive destruction, terror, and death. David Nicolle notes in The Mongol Warlords that "terror and mass extermination of anyone opposing them was a well-tested Mongol tactic". If an enemy refused to submit, the Mongols would employ a strategy of total war; with Mongol leaders ordering the collective slaughter of populations and the destruction of property. The success of Mongol tactics hinged on fear to induce capitulation by the enemy. From the perspective of modern theories of international relations, Quester suggested, "Perhaps terrorism produced a fear that immobilised and incapacitated the forces that would have resisted."

As Mongol conquests spread, that form of psychological warfare proved effective at suppressing resistance to Mongol rule. It was widely known that a single act of resistance would bring the entire Mongol army onto a town to obliterate its occupants. Thus, they ensured obedience through fear. Peasants frequently appear to have joined Mongol troops or to have readily accepted their demands. In the year 1202, after he and Ong Khan allied to conquer the Tatars, he ordered the execution of every Tatar man and boy taller than a linchpin, and enslaved Tatar women for raping. This order was given as collective punishment for the fatal poisoning of Genghis Khan's father, Yesugei, for which the Mongols blamed the Tatars according to The Secret History of the Mongols.

== Demographic changes ==
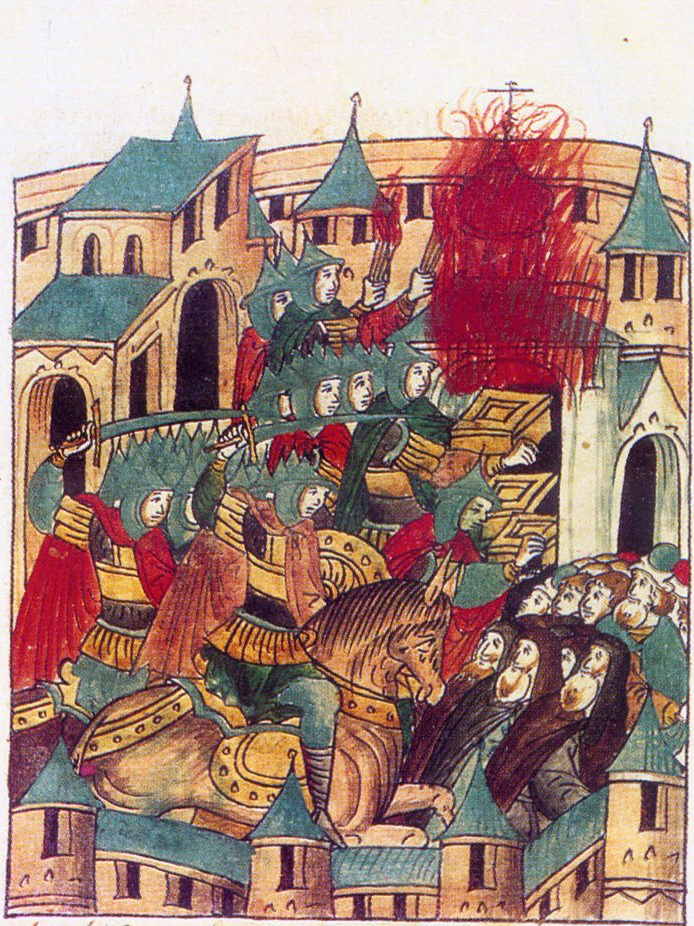
Drawing of Mongols inside Suzdal under Batu Khan (with sword).

Ancient sources described Genghis Khan's conquests as wholesale destruction on an unprecedented scale in certain geographical regions, causing great demographic changes in Asia.

Ibn Al-Athir wrote that Mongol invaders massacred and killed about 700,000 people in Merv. Mustawfi, likewise, wrote that Merv was still in ruins in the middle of the 14th century. Persian philosopher Najm al-din Razi, who was contemporary of Genghis Khan and Subutai, wrote that Mongol invaders killed 700,000 people in his hometown Ray. Hamdallah Mustawfi, who completed Tarikh-i Guzida in 1330, states that 800,000 people were killed and massacred during Hulagu's siege of Baghdad in 1258. While Smith concedes much of what Middle Eastern "chroniclers produced [were] exaggerated estimates", he then goes on to ennumarate the total population of Persia as reduced from 2,500,000 to 250,000 as a result of mass extermination and famine. Population exchanges also sometimes occurred.

The Western Xia Tangut Empire had a population of 3,000,000, but most of the Tanguts including children and women were massacred and killed by the army of Mongol invaders under Genghis Khan. According to John Man the Tangut Empire is little known to anyone other than experts in the field because Genghis Khan's policy called for their complete destruction. He states that "There is a case to be made that this was the first ever recorded example of attempted genocide. It was certainly very successful ethnocide."

The death toll for the Mongol conquests is commonly cited as 40-60 million, a claim originating from the 1978 book "Atlas of World Population History" by Colin McEvedy and Richard Jones. The book has since been criticized for lacking a solid basis for many of its population estimates. In addition, the source used by McEvedy and Jones to support their claim of 35 million deaths in China during the Mongol conquests, "The population statistics of China, A.D. 2–1953" by John Durand, casts doubt on their conclusions. Durand points out that the Mongol censuses were likely very incomplete, leading to an exaggeration of the population decrease.

According to Diana Lary, the Mongol invasions induced population displacement "on a scale never seen before" in Eurasia, but especially in China, where the massive southward migration of Northern Chinese refugees actually managed to merge the southern and northern parts of China, an unexpected historical consequence. China suffered a drastic decline in population in the 13th and 14th centuries. Before the Mongol invasion, Chinese dynasties reportedly had approximately 120 million subjects; after the conquest had been completed in 1279, the 1300 census reported roughly 60 million people. While it is tempting to attribute the major decline solely to Mongol ferocity, scholars now have mixed sentiments on the subject. The South Chinese might account for 40 million unregistered persons who, without passports, would not have appeared in the census. Entire peasant populations joining or enlisted for labor could result in a large population reduction because of food shortages. Scholars such as Frederick W. Mote argue that the wide drop in numbers reflects an administrative failure of records, rather than a de facto decrease, but others, such as Timothy Brook, argue that the Mongols created a system of enserfment of a huge portion of the Chinese populace, causing many to disappear from the census altogether. Other historians, like William McNeill and David Morgan, argue that the Black Death, partially spread by the Mongols, was the main factor behind the demographic decline in that period.

The plague also spread into areas of Western Europe and Africa that the Mongols never reached. The Mongols practiced biological warfare by catapulting diseased cadavers into the cities they besieged. It is believed that fleas remaining on the bodies of the cadavers may have acted as vectors to spread the Black Death. Colin McEvedy estimates the population of European Russia dropped from approximately 7.5 million in 1200 to 7 million in 1500 (in the area controlled by the Grand Principality of Moscow).

== Destruction of culture and property ==
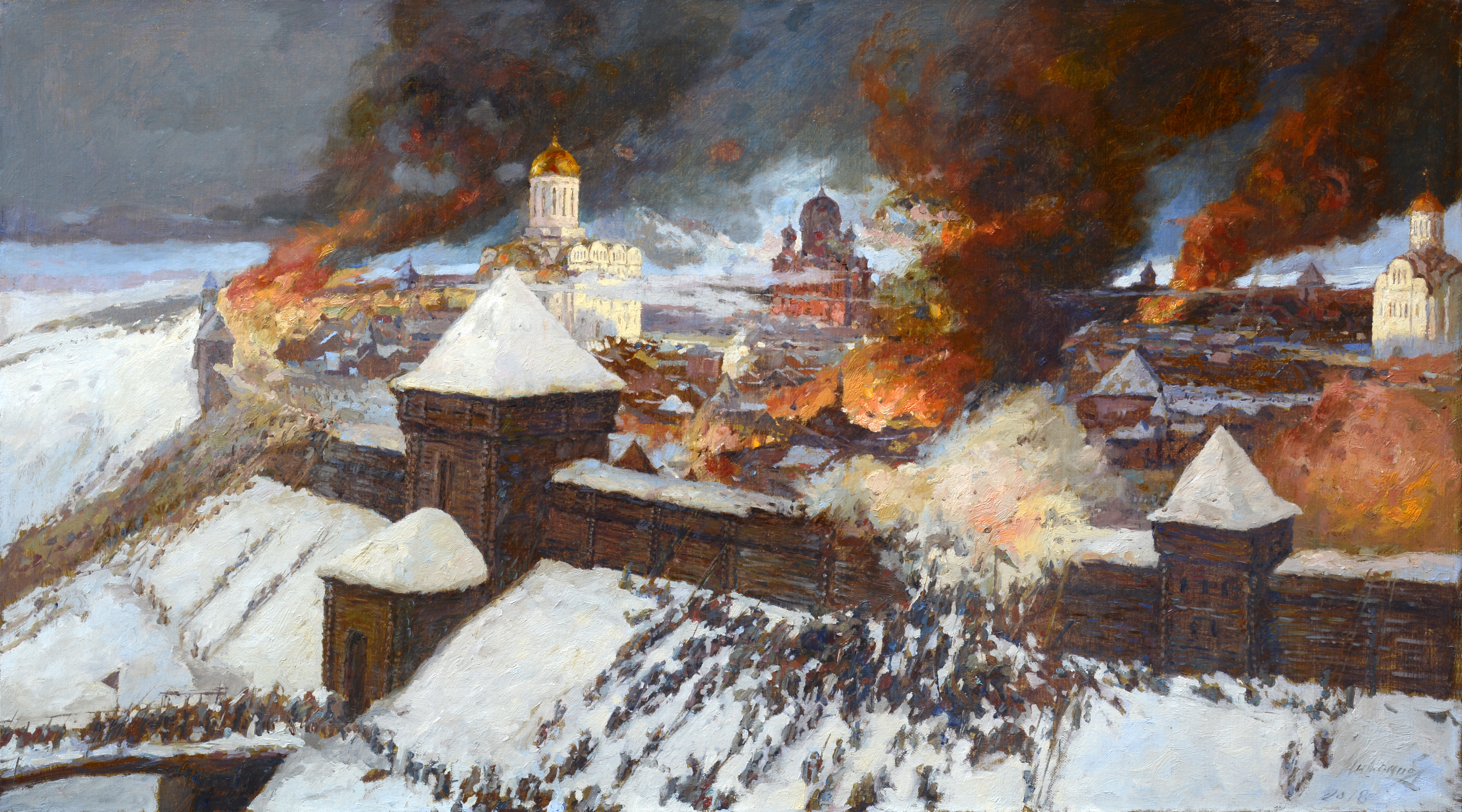
Siege of Ryazan during the Mongol invasion of Kievan Rus' in December 1237

Mongol campaigns in Northern China, Central Asia, Eastern Europe, and the Middle East caused extensive destruction, but there are no exact figures available for that time. The cities of Balkh, Bamyan, Herat, Kiev, Baghdad, Nishapur, Merv, Konye-Urgench, Lahore, Ryazan, Chernigov, Vladimir, and Samarkand suffered serious devastation by the Mongol armies. For example, there is a noticeable lack of Chinese literature from the Jin dynasty, predating the Mongol conquest, and in the Siege of Baghdad (1258), libraries, books, literature, and hospitals were burned: further, "in one week, libraries and their treasures that had been accumulated over hundreds of years were burned or otherwise destroyed.

== Environmental impact ==
According to a study by the Carnegie Institution for Science's Department of Global Energy, the annihilation of so many human beings and cities under Genghis Khan may have scrubbed as much as 700 million tonnes of carbon from the atmosphere by allowing forests to regrow on previously populated and cultivated land.

== See also ==
- Genocides in history
  - List of genocides by death toll
