= Economy-of-effort theory =

Hypothesis in anthropology

The economy-of-effort theory is an idea in anthropology and gender studies. Scholars use it to explain why some cultures assign some forms of work to women and other forms of work to men. In an economy-of-effort scenario, a given task is assigned to men or women (or some other gender role recognized by that culture) not because of differences in their physical bodies but because other things about that culture's gender roles make it more efficient than otherwise.

Ember et al. give the example of a hypothetical culture that assigns logging and woodcutting to men. Because this gives men more familiarity with different types of wood and their properties, this society also assigns men such tasks as the construction of wooden musical instruments, even though none of the differences between men's and women's physical characteristics, such as strength, affect the work or its outcome.

Anthropologists use this idea to explain division of labor scenarios that are not accounted for by theories of male expendability, relative strength, or compatibility with childcare.

== See also ==
- Male expendability
- Division of labor
- Strength theory
- Compatibility-with-childcare theory
