= Ernestine Friedl =

American anthropologist

Ernestine Friedl (August 13, 1920 – October 12, 2015) was an American anthropologist, author, and professor. She served as the president of both the American Ethnological Society (1967) and the American Anthropological Association (1974–1975). Friedl was also the first Dean of Arts and Sciences and Trinity College at Duke University, and was a James B. Duke Professor Emerita. A building on Duke's campus, housing the departments of African and African American Studies, Cultural Anthropology, the Latino/Latina Studies program, and Literature was named in her honor in 2008. Her major interests included gender roles, rural life in modern Greece, and the St. Croix Chippewa Indians of Wisconsin.

== Early life ==
Born in Hungary in 1920, Ernestine Friedl emigrated to the United States with her parents at the age of two years. They settled in the West Bronx neighborhood of New York City. Her father had been a railway functionary in Hungary but in the U.S. became a salesman, while her mother was a garment worker.

== Education ==
Friedl attended Hunter College, a public women's college on the Upper East Side of Manhattan, from which she graduated in 1941 with a Bachelor of Arts in pre-social work.

Friedl attended graduate school at Columbia University from 1941 to 1950, earning a Ph.D. in anthropology.

== Influences ==
While in attendance at Hunter College, Friedl met three influential figures in her life: Dorothy L. Keur and Elsie Steedman, both professors of anthropology who taught and inspired Friedl to pursue the same field, as well as her future husband Harry Levy, who studied classics. It was Levy who encouraged Friedl to continue on with post-graduate studies in order to become an anthropologist. Other influences include Columbia professors Ralph Linton and Ruth Benedict.

== Fieldwork ==
In 1942 and 1943, under the tutelage of Columbia professor Ralph Linton, Friedl studied the St. Croix Chippewa Indians of Wisconsin. She published a dissertation concerning the Chippewa political organization and leadership. After receiving her Ph.D. at Columbia, she and her husband Harry Levy traveled to Greece in 1954 where they engaged in anthropological fieldwork. She had been awarded a Fulbright grant to study life in a Greek village Vasilika, a small agricultural town with a population of 216 people. She returned to the area from 1964 to 1965 to conduct fieldwork with migrants. In 1971 and 1972 Friedl's interest in gender roles developed, as she and Levy spent time in Athens working on her 1975 book Women and Men.

== Career ==
Friedl began teaching in at Brooklyn College in the fall of 1942. Other than a brief intermittent stint at Wellesley College and some courses taught at Queens College, she continued teaching at Brooklyn College until 1973 when she became a professor of anthropology at Duke University. She was elected a Fellow of the American Academy of Arts and Sciences in 1976. While at Duke, she was the chair of the Department of Anthropology from 1973 to 1978, and the Dean of Arts and Sciences and Trinity College from 1980 to 1985.

Friedl served as the secretary and later the president of the American Ethnological Society in 1967. In 1970, she participated in the Committee on the Status of Women in Anthropology as part of the American Anthropological Association, later serving as its president from 1974 to 1975.

== Notable published works ==
- 1956 "Persistence in Chippewa Culture and Personality." American Anthropologist 58: 814–215.
- 1959 "The Role of Kinship in the Transmission of National Culture to Rural Villages in Mainland Greece." American Anthropologist 61: 30–38.
- 1962 Vasilika: A Village in Modern Greece. New York: Holt, Rinehart and Winston.
- 1963 "Studies in Peasant Life." Biennial Review of Anthropology. B Siegl, ed. Palo Alto, CA: Stanford University Press. 276–306.
- 1967 "The Position of Women: Appearance and Reality." Anthropological Quarterly. 40: 97–108.
- 1970 "Fieldwork in a Greek Village." Women in the Field. P. Golde, ed. Chicago: Aldine Press. 193–217.
- 1975 Women and Men: An Anthropologist's View. New York: Holt, Rinehart and Winston.
- 1978 "Society and Sex Roles." Human Nature. 1:8–75. Reprinted in "Culture and Conflict" in 1979. J. Spradley and D. McCurdy, eds.

== See also ==
- Compatibility-with-childcare theory
