= Conscription and sexism =

Discrimination in military enlistment

Gender roles in conscription (2024) Service voluntary for both men and women Conscription for both men and women Selective conscription for both men and women Conscription for men, women may volunteer Selective conscription for men, women may volunteer No data, no military, or no women allowed.

Conscription, sometimes called "the draft", is the compulsory enlistment of people in a national service, most often a military service. Men have been subjected to military drafts in most cases. Currently only four countries conscript women and men on the same formal conditions: Norway, Sweden, Denmark and the Netherlands (in the latter conscription is suspended during peacetime).

Opponents of discrimination against men, including some feminists, have criticized military conscription, or compulsory military service, as sexist. They regard it as discriminatory to compel men, but not women, into military service. Some scholars have argued that male-only conscription may constitute a form of gender inequality, as military service is typically required of men while women are exempt in many countries. This view is associated with analyses of citizenship and gender, which interpret conscription as reinforcing norms of masculinity and civic duty.

== History ==
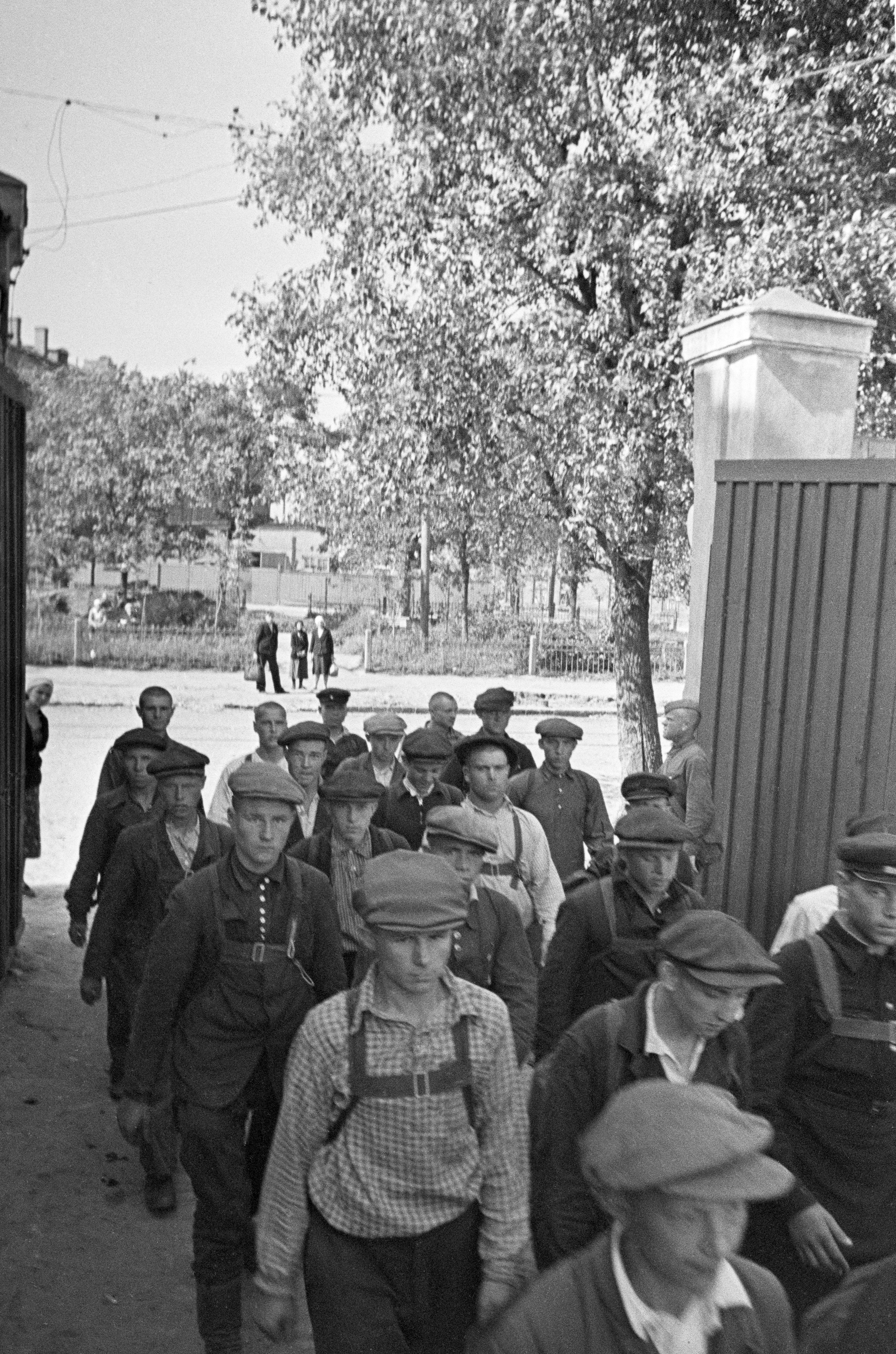
Soviet conscripts, Moscow, 1941

Historically, men have been subjected to conscription in the most cases, and only in the late 20th century did this begin to change, though most countries still require only men to serve in the military. The integration of women into militaries, and especially into combat forces, did not begin on a large scale until late in the 20th century. In his book The Second Sexism: Discrimination Against Men and Boys (2012), philosopher David Benatar states that the theoretical arguments are immaterial to those who are pressed into service: "Some women are excluded from combat, but many more women are exempt. While some men are excluded from combat (because they fail the relevant tests), many more are pressured or forced into combat." According to Benatar, "[t]he prevailing assumption is that where conscription is necessary, it is only men who should be conscripted and, similarly, that only males should be forced into combat". This, he believes, "is a sexist assumption".

== Current practice ==
=== Gender egalitarianism ===
As of now, eleven countries conscript both men and women, of which only Norway (since 2013), Sweden (since 2011 in legislation, since 2018 in practice) and Denmark (since 2025) conscript both sexes on the same formal conditions.

Norway became the first NATO member to have a legally compulsory national service for both men and women, and the first country in the world to draft women on the same formal terms as men. In practice only motivated volunteers are selected to join the army in Norway. Norway introduced conscription for women as an act of gender equality. A similar system exists in Sweden.

The Netherlands, where conscription is not abolished but suspended for peacetime, introduced in 2018 a law extending mandatory military service to women.

In Europe, of the countries which enforce peacetime military national service, conscription for women exists only in Scandinavian countries; in the other countries with such a system (Finland, Switzerland, Austria, Greece, Cyprus, Turkey and several countries of the former Eastern Bloc) only men are conscripted; whereas in most European countries there is no enforced conscription for either gender (see conscription).

==== Women in combat ====
Women in combat refers to female military personnel assigned to combat positions. The role of women in the military has varied across the world’s major countries throughout history with several views for and against women in combat. Over time countries have generally become more accepting of women fulfilling combat roles. In the 21st century, more countries have integrated women in combat. In the United Kingdom, in July 2016, all exclusions on women serving in Ground Close Combat (GCC) roles were lifted.

=== Gender roles ===
The practice of gender roles in conscription has been criticized by various masculinist and men's rights groups, such as the National Coalition for Men, which claims that "no gender oppression is comparable". These groups have been joined on occasion by certain feminist activists. Beginning in the 1970s, "liberal feminists" have argued in favor of extending conscription to women, taking the position that women cannot have the same rights as men if they do not have the same responsibilities, and that exempting women from conscription perpetuates stereotypes of women as weak and helpless.

Anthropologist Ayse Gül Altinay has commented that "given equal suffrage rights, there is no other citizenship practice that differentiates as radically between men and women as compulsory male conscription" and continues elsewhere, stating that "any attempt to de-gender nationalism and citizenship needs to incorporate a discussion of universal male conscription". She goes on to quote feminist writer Cynthia Enloe, who argues that "there is a reason that so many states in the world have implemented military conscription laws for young men: most of those men would not join the state's military if it were left up to them to choose".

Countries—such as Finland, Turkey, Lithuania, Singapore, and South Korea—still use a system of conscription which requires military service from only men, although women are permitted to serve voluntarily.

Other countries conscript women into their armed forces, but with some difference in e.g. service exemptions and length of service; these countries include Israel (where women are about 40% of conscripts drafted every year), Myanmar, Eritrea, Libya, Malaysia, North Korea, Peru and Tunisia.

In Singapore, conscription of women has recently been a subject of debate. In 2022, Defence Minister Ng Eng Hen claimed that the societal cost will outweigh the benefits, and women will have delayed their entry in the workforce. In the same speech, he affirmed his stand that there is no need to conscript women.

==== In Switzerland ====
Men in Switzerland are required by law to perform military service and any man deemed unfit or exempted from service must pay 3% of their annual income as military exemption tax, at a minimum of 400CHF ($420). This gender selective draft has previously been challenged in the country, but the case was rejected by the Federal Supreme Court on the grounds that the specific law requiring service takes precedence over the general law forbidding sex discrimination. Chantal Galladé, former president of the Swiss Defence Committee calls the conscription of men a discrimination against both men and women, cementing the stereotypical gender roles of men and women.

==== In post-communist countries ====
In Soviet society, universal male military duty played a significant role in the construction of masculinity: Soviet ideas about militarized masculinity were based on the ideas of civic duty, heroism and patriotism, and Soviet gender ideology defined military service as the most important instance of turning a boy into a man. In post-Soviet Russia, the link between masculinity and militarization, established by the institute of conscription, has undergone significant changes—largely for political and economic reasons. Unlike the Soviet one, the post-Soviet Russian state no longer provides men with the former social guarantees as a reward for militarization, and the state's rupture of the former social contract leads to the reluctance of young men to go to military service. In addition, with the collapse of the Soviet state, militarized masculinity came into conflict with the new capitalist masculinity: many young men believed that military service was incompatible with a dynamic market economy and competition in the labor market. Scientists also state a significant gap between the state ideology of militarized patriotism and the sentiments of the Russian population, a significant part of which is skeptical about post-Soviet military conflicts and does not regard them as fair.

During the Russian invasion of Ukraine in 2022, the Ukrainian authorities, in order to mobilize men, banned men aged 18 to 60 from leaving the country before the end of hostilities, which could be considered discrimination against men on the basis of gender and violation of human rights.

==== In United States ====
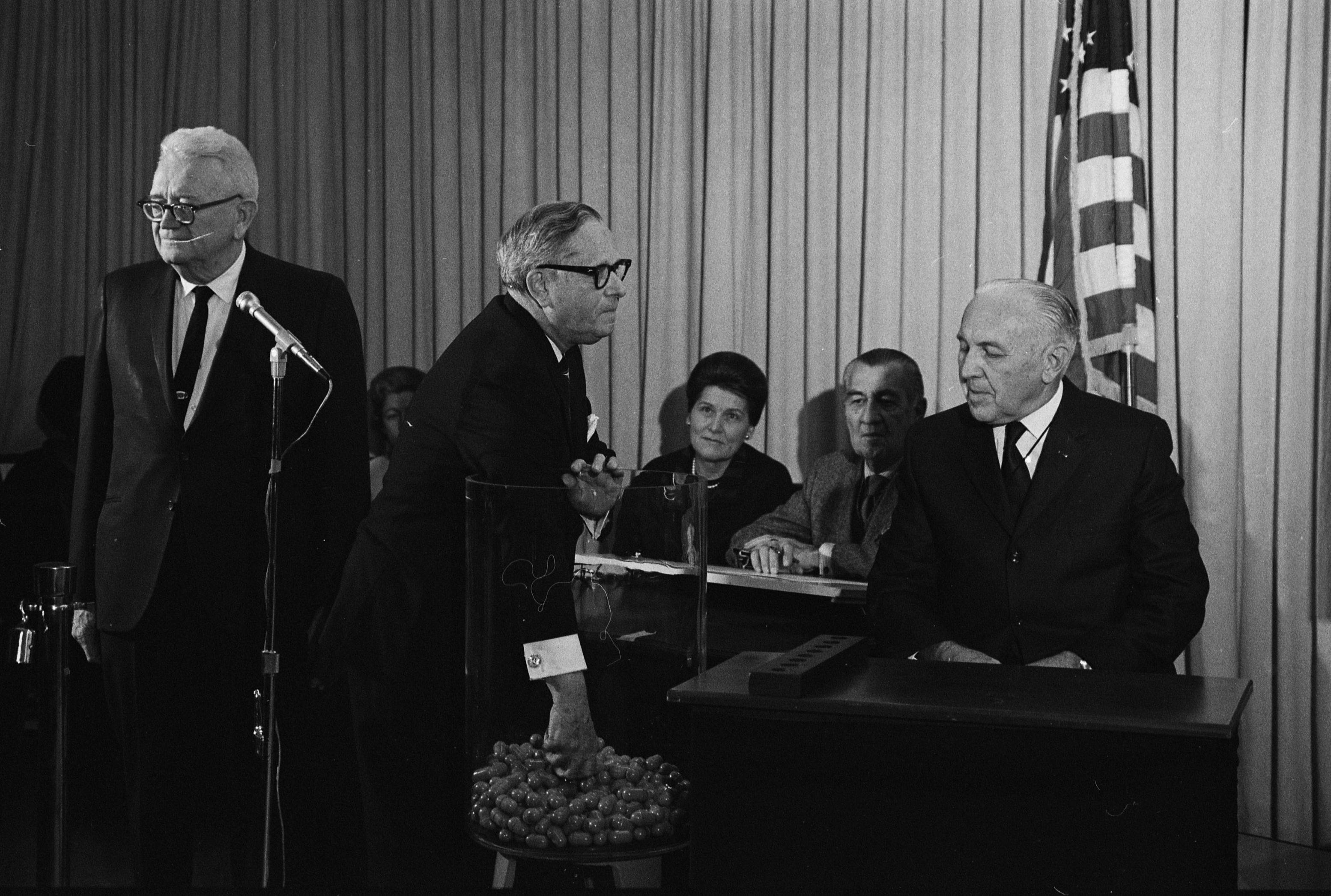
Congressman Alexander Pirnie (R-NY) drawing the first capsule for the Selective Service draft, December 1, 1969

In the United States, most male US citizens and residents must register with the Selective Service System within 30 days of their 18th birthday. Those who fail to register may be punished by up to five years in prison and a fine of up to $250,000, although no non-registrants have been prosecuted since January 1986. They may also be ineligible for federal job training and federal employment, and in certain states, state employment and even driver's licenses.

As of 2014, transgender women are required to register with the Selective Service System, but might be able to apply for exemption in the event they are drafted. The rules for a future draft, including who would be eligible and what deferments or exemptions were available, would be subject to whatever provisions are included in the legislation authorizing inductions, and can't be predicted with certainty. Individuals who are born female and have a sex change are not required to register. U.S. citizens or immigrants who are born male and have a sex change are still required to register. In the event of a resumption of the draft, males who have had a sex change may be able to file a claim for an exemption from military service if they receive an order to report for examination or induction. Transgender men are not required to register but may face difficulties in receiving benefits which require registration.

Some state laws provide for automatic registration with the Selective Service System of draft-eligible applicants for driver's licenses. In practice, only those who apply for a driver's license with an "M" gender marker are automatically registered, regardless of sex as assigned at birth. Those with "F" or "X" (non-gendered) driver's licenses are not automatically registered, regardless of sex assigned at birth. This means that in states that allow driver's license applicants to freely select their gender marker, males can opt out of automatic registration with the Selective Service System by requesting an "X" gender marker on their driver's license.

Currently, women are exempted from the requirement to register with the Selective Service System as only males are required to register; this cannot be changed without Congress amending the law, although combat roles for women have been allowed since January 23, 2013, which certain political analysts have said may prompt Congress or the courts to get rid of the female exemption from Selective Service registration or to equalize the treatment of men and women by ending Selective Service registration.

===== Legal status in the US =====
The Selective Service System in the US had been previously challenged in court in Rostker v. Goldberg in 1981 and in National Coalition for Men v. Selective Service System in 2019. Both were argued in small or large part on the grounds of equal protection and due process on the basis of gender. Other court challenges to Selective Service registration have raised other issues. Professor Stephanie M. Wildman of Santa Clara Law called the decision to uphold the constitutionality of male conscription in Rostker v. Goldberg "chilling to any advocate of full societal participation". In the ensuing congressional debate, Senator Mark Hatfield argued that:

The paternalistic attitude inherent in exclusion of women from past draft registration requirements not only relieved women of the burden of military service, it also deprived them of one of the hallmarks of citizenship. Until women and men share both the rights and the obligations of citizenship, they will not be equal.

On February 22, 2019, Judge Grey H. Miller of the U.S. District Court for the Southern District of Texas, US, deciding on National Coalition for Men v. Selective Service System, declared the current male-only Selective Service registration requirement unconstitutional. That ruling was reversed by the Fifth Circuit. In June 2021, the U.S. Supreme Court declined to review the decision by the Court of Appeals.

=== No enforced conscription ===
Most European countries have no enforced conscription for either gender. France and Portugal, where conscription was abolished, extended their symbolic, mandatory day of information on the armed forces for young people—called Defence and Citizenship Day in France and Day of National Defence in Portugal—to women in 1997 and 2008, respectively; at the same time, the military registry of both countries and obligation of military service in case of war was extended to women.

Radical and pacifist feminists have contended that "by integrating into existing power structures including military forces and the war system without changing them, women merely prop up a male-dominated world instead of transforming it". There were disagreements between liberal advocates for women's equality and radical and pacifist feminists both in 1980 and again in 2016 on whether women should be included in draft registration or draft registration should be opposed for women and men.

== See also ==
- Cannon fodder
- War
- Violence against men
