= Violence against men =

Violent acts committed against men

Violence against men comprises violent acts that are disproportionately, or exclusively, committed against men or boys. Violence against women is the corresponding category in which acts of violence are committed against women or girls.

== Perceptions and aspects ==
Studies of social attitudes show violence is perceived as more or less serious depending on the gender of victim and perpetrator. People are less likely to report a man hitting another man to the police than a man hitting a woman. A study in 2023 found that people—especially women—are less likely to accept violence against women than violence against men.

Male law enforcement officers show a greater reluctance to file charges or reports when a man is the victim of domestic violence. The use of stereotypes by law enforcement is a recognised issue, and international law scholar Solange Mouthaan argues that, in conflict scenarios, sexual violence against men has been ignored in favor of a focus on sexual violence against women and children.

Stigmatization and socially constructed gender stereotypes are barriers to men seeking help following violent victimization. Stereotypes can make it difficult for victims to conceptualize and verbalize what happened, and contribute significantly to underreporting and poor responses toward survivors by relevant authorities. Men often fear that they will be dismissed, accused of being the perpetrator, or ridiculed if they seek help following intimate partner violence. These fears are often confirmed by men who nonetheless seek help.

Due to perceptions of rape as a women's issue, services designed to help victims are often not equipped to help men.

Men are commonly less fearful of violent crime than women despite the fact that men are at much higher risk of being victims of violent crime than women. This phenomenon appears to be a paradox and is termed by researchers as the "fear of crime gender paradox".

== Violence against LGBT+ men ==
Male homosexuality has been persecuted, often violently, throughout history. Termed "sodomy" during the Middle Ages and the early modern period, men found guilty of "sodomy" were often subjected to capital punishment for homosexuality.

In its December 2020 report, the International Lesbian, Gay, Bisexual, Trans and Intersex Association (ILGA) found that homosexuality is criminalized in 67 of 193 UN member states and one non-independent jurisdiction, the Cook Islands, while two UN member states, Iraq and Egypt, criminalize it de facto but not in legislation. Afghanistan, Brunei, Iran, Iraq, Mauritania, Nigeria, Saudi Arabia, Somalia, United Arab of Emirates and Yemen still allow for the prescription of the death penalty if one engages in homosexual sexual activity.

According to the Human Rights Campaign, 26 percent of gay men and 37 percent of bisexual men experience rape, physical violence, or stalking by an intimate partner, compared to 29 percent of straight men. Additionally, 40 percent of gay men and 47 percent of bisexual men have experienced sexual violence other than rape, compared to 21 percent of straight men.

Research by Rebecca L. Stotzer and Margaret Shih found that masculinity is seen as fragile, needing constant reinforcement through displays of heterosexuality and rejection of femininity and homosexuality. This insecurity can cause men to react aggressively to anything challenging traditional gender roles and can significantly influence reactions to LGBT+ individuals.

== Domestic violence ==
Female and male perpetrators of domestic violence tend to commit different types of acts of violence. For example, women are more likely to throw or hit with objects, kick, bite, or punch, while men are more likely to choke or strangle. The CDC's National Intimate Partner and Sexual Violence Survey during 2016-2017 found that in the United States, 42.3% of men and 42.0% of women reported having experienced physical violence by an intimate partner in their lifetime. For severe violence, 24.6% of men and 32.5% of women reported lifetime exposure. In the United States, in 2021, approximately 1,079 men were killed by their intimate partners, compared to approximately 1,690 women.

Men who are victims of domestic violence are often reluctant to report it or to seek help. Shamita Das Dasgupta and Erin Pizzey are among those who argue that, as with other forms of violence against men, intimate partner violence is generally less recognized in society when the victims are men. Domestic violence accusations by males against females are often trivialized or belittled by police. Research since the 1990s has identified issues of perceived and actual bias when police are involved, with the male victim being negated even while injured. Many people, both male and female, are hesitant to report domestic violence, for example, 1.9 million people aged 16–59 told the Crime Survey for England and Wales (year ending March 2017) that they were victims of domestic violence and 79% did not report their partner or ex-partner. Of the 1.9 million, approximately 713,000 were male, while 1.2 million were female.

Emmanuel Rowlands' research sheds light on domestic violence against men in intimate relationships. He found that cultural and masculine expectations often hide male victims' experiences. In Johannesburg, South Africa, male victims of domestic violence are often overlooked or dismissed in gender-based violence studies. He discusses how societal expectations and the lack of recognition or support for male victims contribute to a culture of silence around male domestic abuse.

== Mass killings ==
In situations of structural violence that include war and genocide, men and boys are frequently singled out and killed. The singling out of men and boys of military age occurs due the assumption that they are potential combatants and is a form of gender-based violence. These acts of violence come from the assumptions of the male role in combat situations. This practice goes back well into recorded history; Roman records point to the mass killing of a conquered settlement's men and the enslavement of its women. The murder of targets by sex was also committed during the Kosovo War; estimates of civilian male victims of mass killings suggest that they made up more than 90% of all civilian casualties.

Non-combatant men and boys have been targets of mass killings during war. Forced conscription can also be considered a gender-based disregard for men's lives. Furthermore, examples may include the filtration camps set up by Russia in occupied areas during the 2022 Russian invasion of Ukraine.

== Sexual violence ==
Sexual violence against men is often under-reported and de-emphasized. The CDC's National Intimate Partner and Sexual Violence Survey during 2010-2012 found that the number of women who were raped in the 12 months preceding the survey was 1,270,000 while the number of men who were made to penetrate was 1,267,000. The CDC excluded male victims from the fact sheet summary, noting only that "1.3 million women were raped during the year preceding the survey" without mentioning the similar finding for men.

According to the 2018 Family, domestic and sexual violence in Australia report, police forces in Australia recorded 4,100 male victims of sexual violence in 2016, as opposed to 18,900 female victims that year (thus, male victims constituted 17.8% of all victims). For male victims experiencing sexual violence since the age of 15, 55% reported a female perpetrator while 51% reported a male perpetrator (some who experienced sexual violence multiple times were victimised by men and women); by comparison, 98% of female victims since age 15 reported a male perpetrator, while 4.2% reported a female perpetrator (also some overlap here).

In 2012, the UN refugee agency issued guidelines for UNHCR staff and aid workers on how to support and treat male victims of sexual violence and rape in war and human rights situations. The guidelines "include tips on the challenging task of identifying victims of sexual and gender-based violence (SGBV), given the stigma attached to rape".

Adult men have been forcefully circumcised, most notably in the compulsory conversion of non-Muslims to Islam. and more recently especially in Kenya. In South Africa, custom allows uncircumcised Xhosa-speaking men past the age of circumcision (i.e., 25 years or older) to be overpowered by other men and forcibly circumcised. While some scholars view forced adult male circumcision as (gendered) sexual violence, the International Criminal Court ruled in 2011 that such acts were not "sexual violence," but rather fell under the label of "other inhumane acts".

Male sexual victimization is often minimized or dismissed. Causes include the stereotype of men being "sexually insatiable", the masculine expectation of "male invincibility" or that a "real man" can protect himself, that a gay victim "asked for it", and that a victim's arousal signifies that the event was consensual.

Sexual assault within military ranks is a significant yet under-discussed issue affecting male servicemembers. Despite longstanding "zero-tolerance" policies, sexual violence persists, with men both as perpetrators and victims. Studies and surveys within the U.S. military have revealed that sexual assault against men is characterized by distinct challenges, often exacerbated by the hierarchical and insular nature of military life. Men in the military face particular vulnerabilities to sexual violence, which is frequently perpetrated by fellow servicemembers and often involves multiple assailants. For example, a study published in the Journal of Peace Research in 2017 highlighted that nearly 1% of active-duty servicemen reported experiencing sexual assault over a one-year period, with perpetrators typically being military colleagues. The persistence of sexual assault against men in the military can be partially attributed to socialization processes within the ranks. Informal socialization practices, including sexualized hazing, often trivialize or even endorse sexual harassment and assault, establishing a culture where such acts are seen as permissible forms of punishment or means of enforcing conformity. Furthermore, official socialization of officers does not always effectively oppose these norms, since military training continues to promote a type of masculinity that undermines efforts to avoid sexual assault.

A comprehensive study by Gruber and Fineran compared the effects of sexual harassment and bullying on high school students' school engagement and academic outcomes. The findings suggest that while both sexual harassment and bullying adversely affect students, sexual harassment has a more significant impact on school attachment and academic performance for both male and female students. For men, the harassment is frequently linked with homophobic taunting, thereby not only targeting their gender but also questioning their sexuality, regardless of their actual sexual orientation.

== War ==
=== Conscription ===
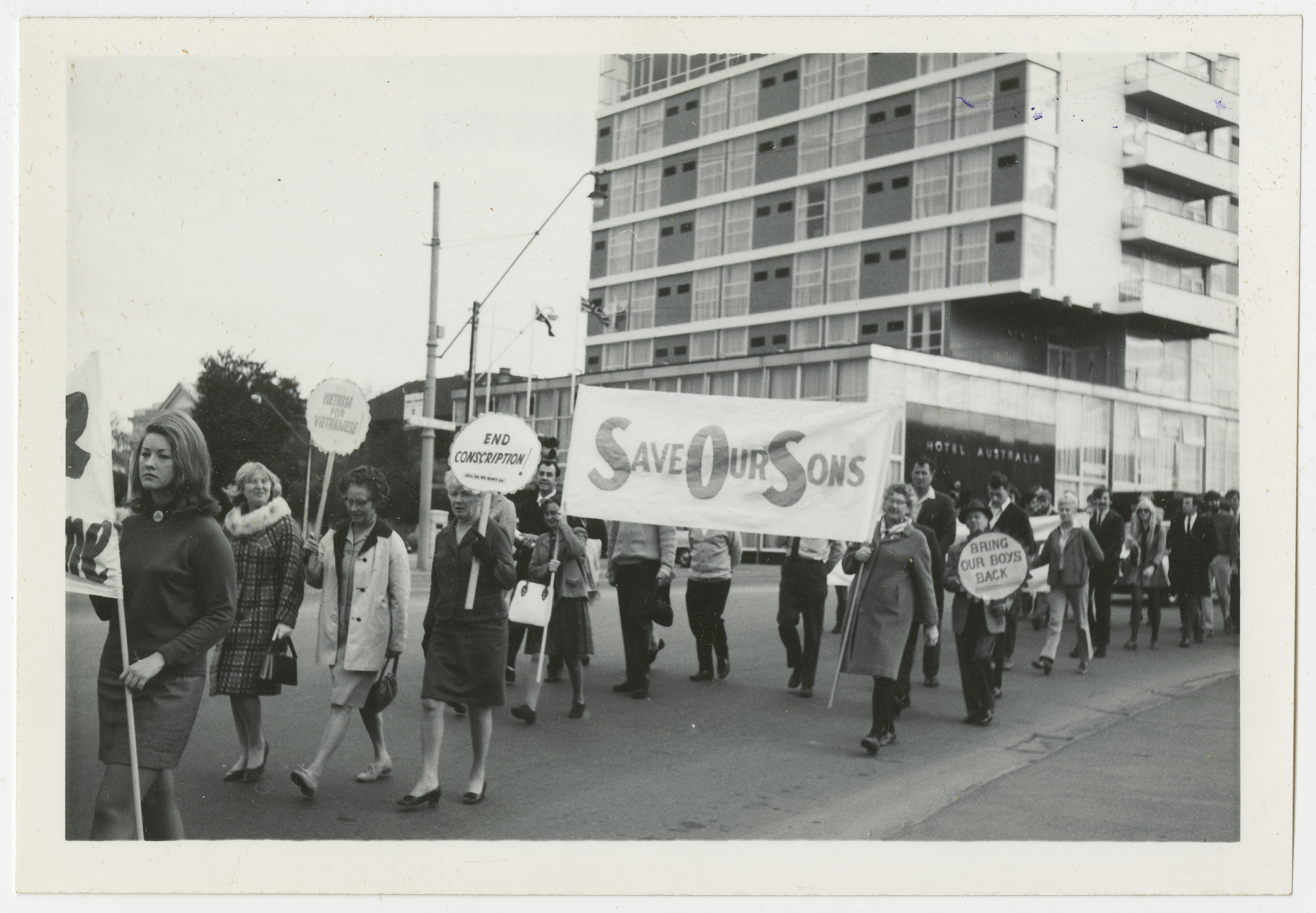
Women protest conscription and war on World Peace Day March near the Hotel Australia, King William Street, North Adelaide, 1969.

Conscription, sometimes called "the draft", is the compulsory enlistment of people in a national service, most often a military service. Historically, only men have been subjected to military drafts, and currently only Four countries conscript women and men on the same formal conditions: Denmark, Norway, Sweden and the Netherlands.

Male-only conscription, or compulsory military service, has been criticized as sexist. Critics regard it as discriminatory to compel men, but not women, into military service. They say the conscription of men normalizes male violence, conscripts are indoctrinated into sexism and violence against men, and military training socializes conscripts into patriarchal gender roles. Despite that, some feminist organizations have resisted inclusion of women in conscription, most notably the Norwegian Association for Women's Rights.

=== Wartime sexual violence ===
Wartime sexual violence committed against men is used as psychological warfare in order to demoralize the enemy. The practice is ancient, and was recorded as taking place during the Crusades. During periods of armed conflict men may be raped, sexually mutilated, sexually humiliated, forced to commit incest, or even enslaved. Castration in particular is used as a means of physical torture with strong psychological effects, namely the loss of the ability to procreate and the loss of the status of a full man. In recent conflicts such as the Bosnian war and a number of smaller conflicts across East Africa the most commonly reported act of sexual violence was genital violence. While sexual violence in all its forms is criminalized in international law, the culture of silence around sexual violence against men often leaves male victims with no support.

Several men have described being raped and subjected to other forms of sexual violence perpetrated by both female and male soldiers and interrogators while detained at the Guantanamo Bay detention camp and CIA black sites.

In one study, less than 3% of organizations that address rape as a weapon of war mention men or provide services to male victims, and nearly a quarter of those organization explicitly deny that sexual violence against men is an issue. Works of Dorota Glowacka illuminates the under-researched issue of sexual violence against men and boys during the holocaust. In her study Glowacka explores a multitude of cases where male victims experienced sexual assault, coercion, and humiliation within Nazi concentration camps, a subject that has historically been overshadowed by the predominant focus on female victims of sexual violence.

== Homicide ==
Homicide statistics according to the US Bureau of Justice Statistics
Male offender/Male victim	65.3%
Male offender/Female victim	22.7%
Female offender/Male victim	9.6%
Female offender/Female victim	2.4%

In the U.S., crime statistics from 1976 onwards show that men are over-represented as victims in homicide involving both male and female offenders (74.9% of victims are male). Men also make up the majority (88%) of homicide perpetrators regardless if the victim is female or male. According to the Bureau of Justice Statistics, women who kill men are most likely to kill acquaintances, spouses or boyfriends while men are more likely to kill strangers.

In Australia, men are also over-represented as victims, with the Australian Institute of Criminology finding that men are 11.5 times more likely than women to be killed by a stranger.

Data from the U.K. also shows a homicide rate for males to be twice that of females. While the proportion of homicide victims in the U.K. in the 1960s was fairly evenly split between men and women, the genders have since shown different trends: while female victim numbers remained static, male numbers increased.

== Police killings ==
In the United States, police killings have disproportionally targeted young men. The likelihood of dying as a result of police use of force is 1 in 2,000 men and 1 in 33,000 women. Studies using recent data have found that Black, Hispanic, and Native American/Alaskan individuals are disproportionately stopped by police and killed in encounters. These inequalities in turn show higher rates of death by police for people of color, particularly black men having a 1 in 1,000 chance of being killed by police use of force.

Data from Australia, the European Union, and the United Kingdom also demonstrates that death while in police custody is more frequent among men.

== By country ==
=== India ===
A study of men in the rural area of Haryana, India found that 52.4% of men in this area experienced some form of gender-based violence.

=== Nigeria ===
In Nigeria, domestic violence against men is often overlooked and carries a cultural stigma. Adetutu Aragbuwa's research into online comments on Nigerian news articles shows mixed views: while some justify violence against men as self-defense by women, others outright condemn all forms of violence.

=== Sudan ===
In the context of the Darfur genocide, gender-based violence was not only prevalent against women but also systematically used against men and boys as a tool of war and genocide. This gender-based violence included acts that emasculated victims, such as sexual violence, humiliation, genital harm, and killings based on sex. These acts were deeply gendered, reflecting and reinforcing hegemonic gender norms within Sudanese society.

== See also ==
- Bodily integrity
- Children's rights
- Male expendability
- Men's rights movement
- Misandry
- Prison rape
- Sex differences in crime
- Violence against women
