= William A. Chatfield =

American government executive and lobbyist

William Chatfield
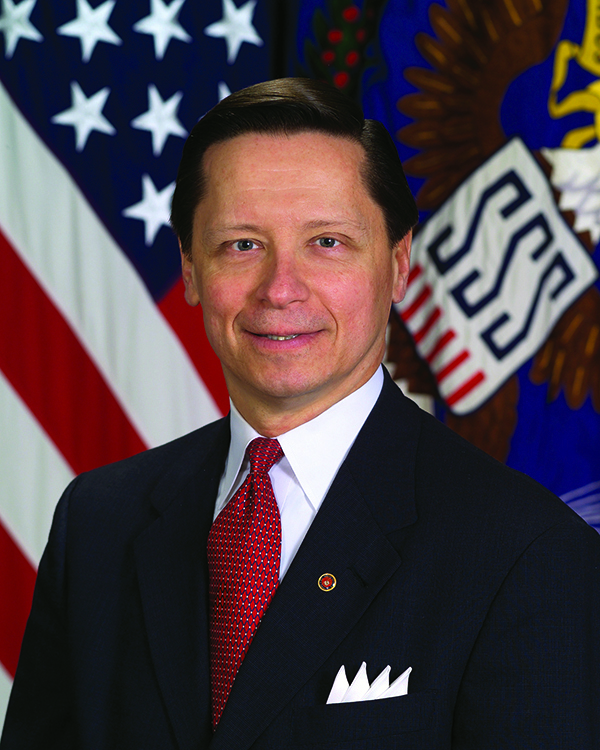

11th Director of the Selective Service System
- In office November 29, 2004 - May 29, 2009
- President: George W. Bush; Barack Obama
- Preceded by: Alfred V. Rascon; Jack Martin (acting)
- Succeeded by: Lawrence Romo; Ernest E. Garcia (acting)

Personal details
- Born: July 14, 1951 (age 74) Catskill, New York
- Education: Union College; American University

William Austin Chatfield (born July 14, 1951) is an American government executive and lobbyist who served as the 11th Director of Selective Service System from November 29, 2004, to May 29, 2009, having been nominated by President George W. Bush and confirmed by the U.S. Senate. He was directly responsible to the President for the management of the Selective Service System.

== Early life and education ==
Born in Catskill, New York, Chatfield was raised in Springfield and Cranford, New Jersey. He graduated from Cranford High School in 1969. Chatfield attended Union College in Cranford, majoring in political science and criminal justice, and later continued his studies at American University.

== Career ==
Prior to his presidential nomination, Chatfield, a Texas resident at the time, had worked over 30 years in the executive and legislative branches of the Federal government.

Chatfield commenced public service by enlisting in the United States Marine Corps in 1970. He received military intelligence training in Coronado, California and was sent to Hawaii, where he remained until the end of his active duty commitment. Transitioning to the Marine Corps Reserve back in New Jersey, Chatfield served as Doorkeeper of the U.S. House of Representatives from 1978 through 1979, and performed in several appointed positions of increasing responsibility from 1980 through 1987 in the Reagan Administration. He served on the staff of the Deputy Undersecretary for Policy at the Department of Defense; as a Regional Director of the Civil Aeronautics Board; Special Assistant to the Director, Office of Personnel Management; Assistant to the Chairman of the Consumer Product Safety Commission; Special Assistant for Congressional Liaison in the Department of the Interior; and Staff Advisor to the Commissioner at the Interstate Commerce Commission.

From 1987 until his appointment with the Selective Service, he was a lobbyist and in 1989, established Kindness & Chatfield Associates, a lobbying firm with former Congressman Tom Kindness.

Chatfield is a veteran of the U.S. Marine Corps, with 34 years of active duty and reserve service. He retired from the Marine Corps Reserve as a Chief Warrant Officer 4.
