= Gil Coronado =

American politician

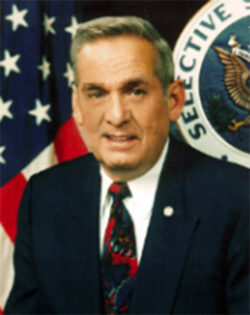

9th Director of the Selective Service System
- In office October 7, 1994 – May 23, 2001
- President: Bill Clinton; George W. Bush
- Preceded by: Robert W. Gambino
- Succeeded by: Alfred V. Rascon

Personal details
- Born: February 21, 1936 Corpus Christi, Texas
- Died: February 7, 2026 (aged 89) San Antonio, Texas
- Party: Democratic

Gil Coronado (February 21, 1936 – February 7, 2026) was an American administrator who served as the Director of the Selective Service System from 1994 to 2001.

He died on February 7, 2026, in San Antonio, Texas at age 89.
