= Vietnam War draft =

U.S. conscription procedure during the Vietnam War

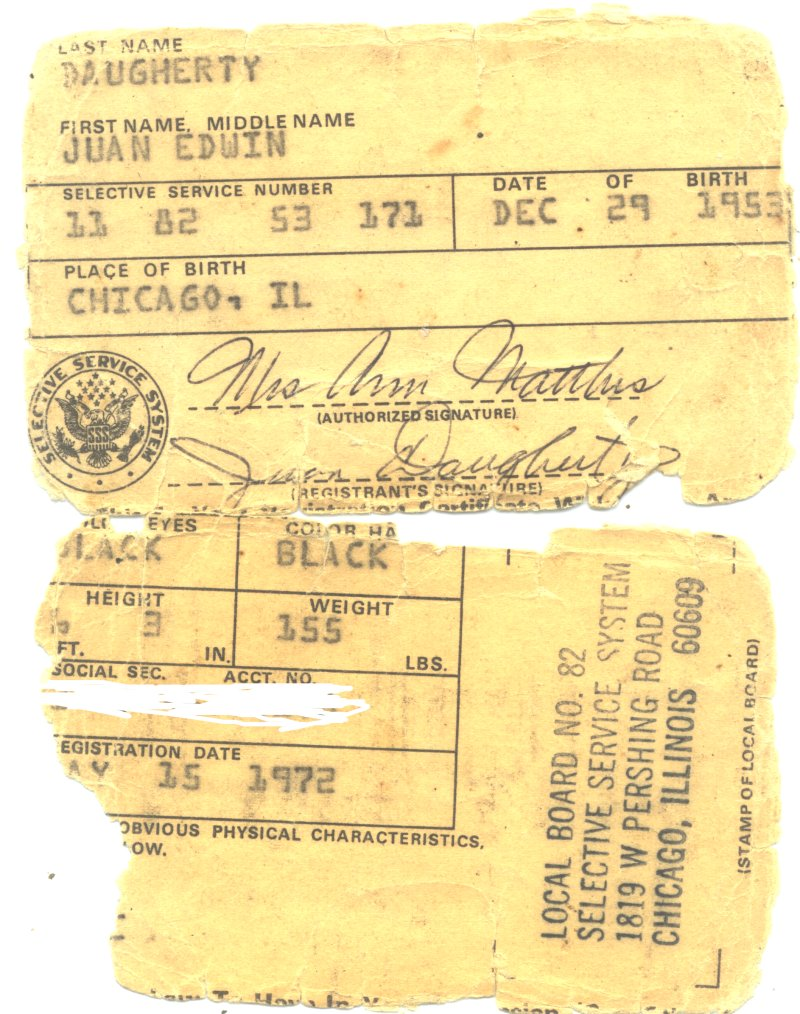
A Vietnam War-era draft card. Retention of the card was legally required.

The Vietnam War Draft was a military draft implemented under the Selective Service System, drafting over 1.7 million men to serve in the Vietnam War. During the peacetime years before the Vietnam War, a draft existed, while many soldiers were joined on a voluntary basis. In the second half of 1965, with American troops entering Vietnam, there was a substantial expansion of the US armed forces, and this required a dramatic increase in the number of men drafted each month.

== Overview ==
US involvement in Vietnam began in 1946 with support for France during the French Indo-China war. The Geneva Accords of July 1954 brought an end to the conflict, with a new border drawn along the 17th parallel separating the Communist North and the French-controlled South. South Vietnam subsequently gained independence from France and Ngô Đình Diệm became prime minister. U.S. interest in Vietnam increased through the early 1960s, with the U.S. sending military advisors to Vietnam in 1961 and supporting the 1963 Diem Coup and the resulting execution of Ngô Đình Diệm. On August 2, 1964, a U.S. Navy destroyer was attacked by three North Vietnamese torpedo boats in the Gulf of Tonkin. A similar attack on two U.S. destroyers was reported on the night of August 4, but that report was incorrect. Both incidents were used to justify the Gulf of Tonkin Resolution, granting President Lyndon B. Johnson the authority to allocate U.S. military resources to the conflict in Vietnam. Johnson deployed 190,000 military personnel to Vietnam in 1965 and approximately 400,000 the following year. These deployments increased the demand for US military personnel, and led ultimately to the first Vietnam draft.

Between 1965 and 1973 over 1.7 million men were drafted. Around 648,500 draftees, or 38% of that number served in Vietnam, comprising about a quarter of the US forces deployed to the country. 17,725 draftees died, just over 30% of all American combat deaths in the war. The last man was drafted on June 30, 1973.

Numbers of men drafted over the course of the Vietnam war
Year	Number drafted
1964	112,386
1965	230,991
1966	382,010
1967	228,263
1968	296,406
1969	283,586
1970	162,746
1971	94,092
1972	49,514
1973	646

== Draft Boards ==
The primary way draftees were chosen for the majority of the war was the Draft Board. These were local bodies, made up mainly of veterans, who called up registered men and evaluated them for service. There was the perception that the process was unfair, in particular towards minorities. This would be reformed with the 1970 draft.

Operating under the framework established by the Selective Service Act of 1948, these boards were intended to handle conscription at a community level. The underlying policy assumed that civilian board members would be better equipped to judge which men in their own communities were suited for military service and which ones qualified for exemptions. Each of the roughly 4,000 local boards typically consisted of three to five civilian members. These individuals were appointed by the president based on recommendations from state governors, and they were legally required to live in the county or district they overseen. The boards held broad discretionary authority. Their main duties involved classifying registrants into specific categories—such as 1-A for immediate availability, 2-S for college student deferments, or 4-F for physical and mental disqualifications—while meeting monthly induction quotas set by the Department of Defense.

While the system was designed to reflect local communities, the actual makeup of the draft boards differed significantly from the population of draft-eligible men. Board members were overwhelmingly white, middle-aged or older, and were frequently veterans of World War II or the Korean War. This demographic gap led to heavy criticism that the selection process was inherently biased against minorities and lower-income groups.

In many urban centers and rural areas with large minority populations, draft boards frequently lacked any Black or Hispanic members. Because of this, minority men were often classified as 1-A and drafted at disproportionately higher rates than white registrants. Furthermore, middle- and upper-class men regularly avoided service by securing 2-S college deferments. To meet their strict monthly quotas, local boards were forced to draw heavily from working-class and low-income populations who lacked the resources, legal advice, or educational access to successfully secure deferments.

== Opposition to the Draft ==
Anti-war movements emerged in the U.S. throughout the 1960s, many amongst college students and civil rights groups. By the end of the decade, the anti-war movement included many veterans who had served in Vietnam as well as middle-class parents with draft-age sons. College students were entitled to a deferment (2-S status) but were subject to the draft if they dropped out, stopped making "normal progress" in community college (i.e., started a fifth semester before transferring to a four-year college) or graduated. By 1967, the number of U.S. military personnel in Vietnam was around 500,000. The war was costing the U.S. $25 billion a year, and many of the young men drafted were being sent to fight in a war which they opposed. Martin Luther King Jr. also started to support the anti-war movement, believing the war to be immoral and expressing alarm at the number of African American soldiers that were being killed.

Nixon's campaign pledge to end American involvement in the war lacked a deadline and under Vietnamization he announced withdrawal of 14,300 troops each month. November 15, 1969, was marked by the largest anti-war protest in the history of the United States, featuring many anti-war political speakers and popular singers of the time. Later, Nixon claimed to have been watching sports as the anti-war demonstration took place outside the White House.

== The 1969 Draft Lottery ==
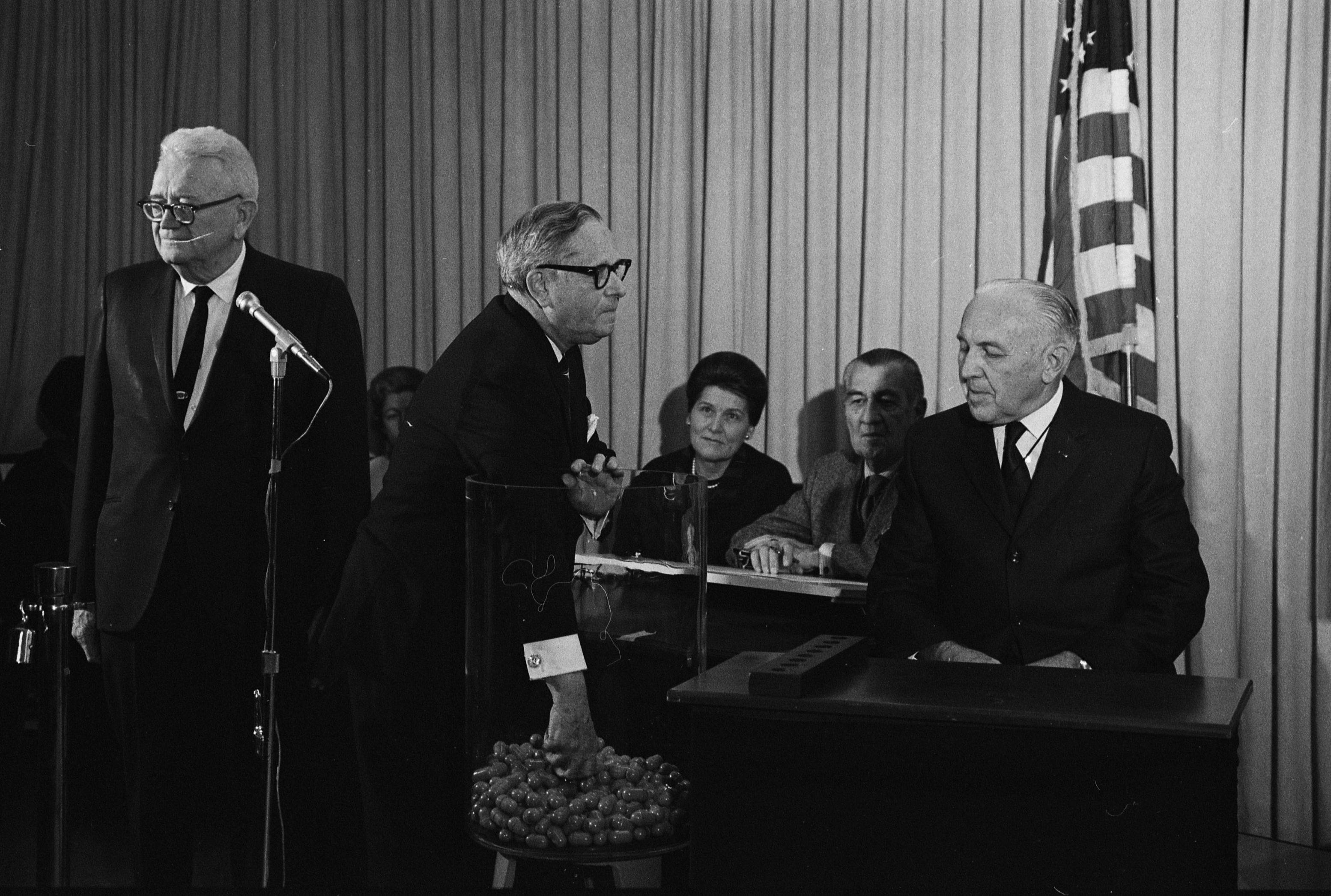
Representative Alexander Pirnie (R-NY) drawing the first number

There were complaints that the process by which the system chose which young men were to be drafted was biased against the poor and the uneducated. The government decided in 1969 to reduce this bias by introducing a random element into the selection process. A lottery based on birth dates was conducted by the Selective Service System on December 1, 1969, to determine the order of conscription for men born between January 1, 1944, and December 31, 1950.

After much debate within the Nixon administration and Congress, the latter decided that a gradual transition to an all-volunteer force was affordable, feasible, and would enhance the nation's security. On November 26, 1969, Congress abolished a provision in the Military Selective Service Act of 1967 which prevented the president from modifying the selection procedure ("... the President in establishing the order of induction for registrants within the various age groups found qualified for induction shall not effect any change in the method of determining the relative order of induction for such registrants within such age groups as has been heretofore established ..."), and Nixon issued an executive order prescribing a process of random selection.

=== Method ===
In principle, the function of the first draft was to select dates within a calendar year at random, with men whose birthdays matched those dates being drafted according to the sequence the dates were selected. The 366 days of the year (including February 29) were printed on slips of paper. These pieces of paper were then each placed in opaque plastic capsules, which were then mixed in a shoebox and then placed into a deep glass jar. Capsules were drawn from the jar one at a time and opened.

The first date drawn was September 14; all registrants with that birthday were assigned lottery number 1. The next numbers drawn corresponded to April 24, December 30, February 14, October 18, and so forth. The last number drawn corresponded to June 8. All men of draft age (born January 1, 1944, to December 31, 1950) who shared a birthday would be called to serve at once. The first 195 birthdays drawn were later called to serve in the order they were drawn; the last of these was September 24.

On December 1, 1969, a second lottery, identical in process to the first, was held with the 26 letters of the alphabet. The first letter drawn was "J", which was assigned number 1. The second letter was "G", and so on, until all 26 letters were assigned numbers. Among men with the same birthdate, the order of induction was determined by the ranks of the first letters of their last, first, and middle names. An eligible man with initials "JJJ" would have been first within the shared birthdate, followed by "JGJ", "JDJ", and "JXJ"; anyone with initials "VVV" would have been last.

SSS Draft scatter plot of the days of the year (horizontal) and their lottery numbers (vertical) for the 1969 draft lottery. December birthdays (far right) were assigned many low numbers (bottom), representing early induction, and few high numbers (top).

The outcome of the draft process was the subject of controversy. As with any truly random process, the results of the draft were not evenly distributed and appeared to cluster together, and it happened that November and December births, or numbers 306 to 366, were assigned mainly to lower draft order numbers representing earlier calls to serve. This led to complaints that the lottery was not truly random as the legislation required. Only five days in December—December 2, 12, 15, 17, and 19—were higher than the last call number of 195. Had the days been evenly distributed, 14 days in December would have been expected to remain uncalled. From January to December, the rank of the average draft pick numbers were 5, 4, 1, 3, 2, 6, 8, 9, 10, 7, 11, and 12. A Monte Carlo simulation found that the probability of a random order of months being this close to the 1–12 sequence expected for unsorted slips was 0.09%. An analysis of the procedure suggested that "The capsules were put in a box month by month, January through December, and subsequent mixing efforts were insufficient to overcome this sequencing".

=== Aftermath and modification ===
The draft lottery had social and economic consequences because it generated further resistance to military service. Those who resisted were generally young, well-educated, healthy men. Reluctance to serve in Vietnam led many young men to try to join the National Guard, state-based military reserve forces, as they were aware that the National Guard would be less likely to send soldiers to the war in Vietnam. Many men were unable to join the National Guard even though they had passed their physicals, because in many states National Guards had long waiting lists to enlist.^{p. 51.} Others chose to serve in military branches like the Navy or the Coast Guard as to avoid active combat.^{p. 54} Still other men chose legal sanctions such as imprisonment,^{p. 62} showing their disapproval by illegally burning their draft cards or draft letters,^{p. 63} or simply not presenting themselves for military service. Others left the country, usually moving to Canada.^{p. 71}

The 1960s were a time of turmoil in the United States, beginning with the civil rights movement which set the standards for practices by the anti-war movement. The 1969 draft lottery only encouraged resentment of the Vietnam War and the draft. It strengthened the anti-war movement, and all over the United States, people decried discrimination by the draft system "against low-education, low-income, underprivileged members of society". The lottery procedure was improved the next year although public discontent continued to grow.

== Draft lottery (1970) ==
For the draft lottery held on July 1, 1970 (which covered 1951 birthdates for use during 1971, and is sometimes called the 1971 draft), scientists at the National Bureau of Standards prepared 78 random permutations of the numbers 1 to 366 using random numbers selected from published tables. From the 78 permutations, 25 were selected at random and transcribed to calendars using 1 = January 1, 2 = January 2, ... 366 = December 31. Those calendars were sealed in envelopes. Twenty-five more permutations were selected and sealed in 25 more envelopes without transcription to calendars. The two sets of 25 envelopes were furnished to the Selective Service System.

On June 2, an official picked two envelopes, thus one calendar and one raw permutation. The 365 birthdates (for 1951) were written down, placed in capsules, and put in a drum in the order dictated by the selected calendar. Similarly, the numbers from 1 to 365 were written down and placed into capsules in the order dictated by the raw permutation.

On July 1, the drawing date, one drum was rotated for an hour and the other for a half-hour (its rotating mechanism failed). Pairs of capsules were then drawn, one from each drum, one with a 1951 birthdate and one with a number 1 to 366. The first date and number drawn were September 16 and 139, so all men born September 16, 1951, were assigned draft number 139. The 11th draws were the date July 9 and the number 1, so men born July 9 were assigned draft number 1 and drafted first.

== Draft lottery (1971–1975) ==
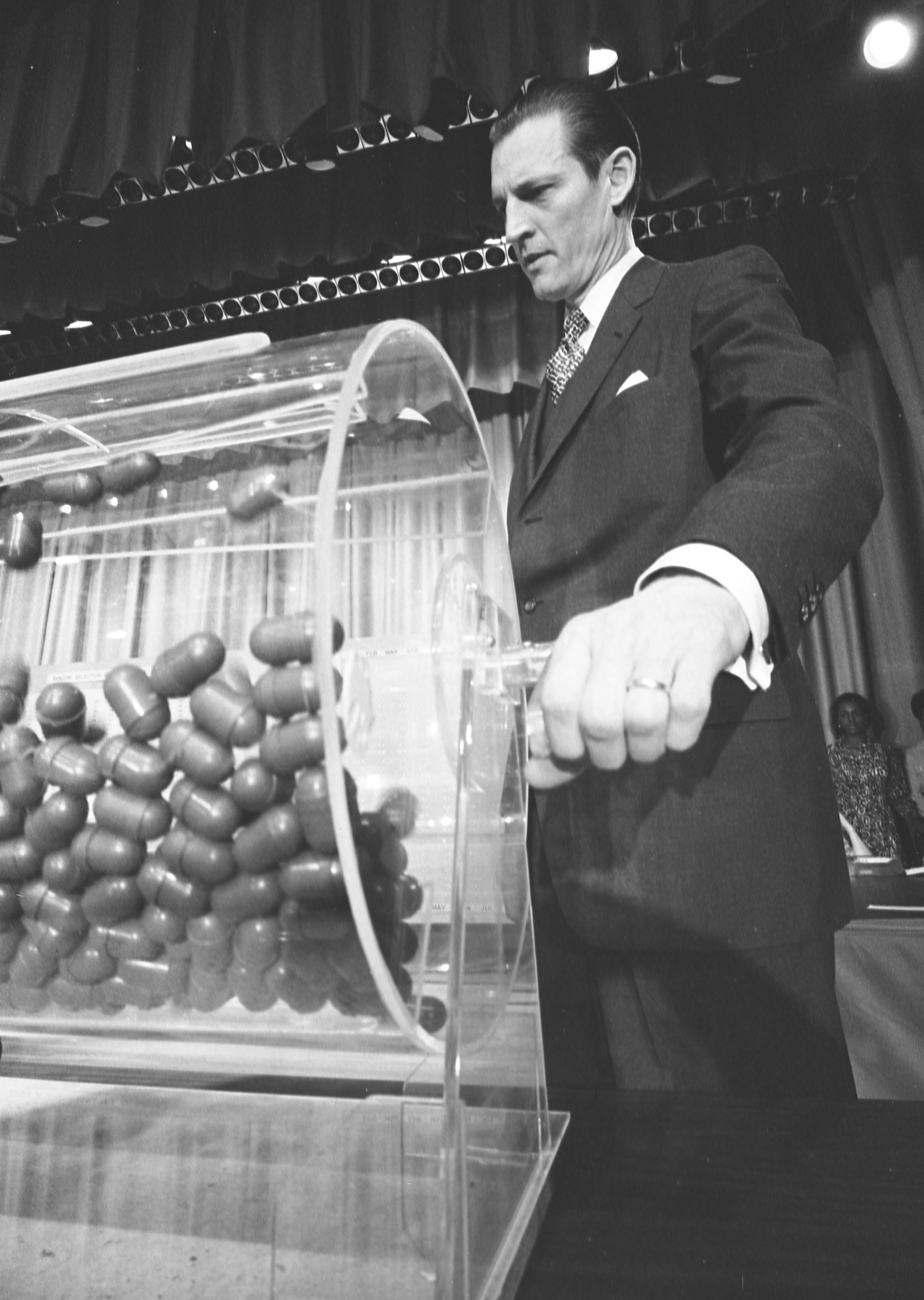
The 1972 draft lottery being conducted by Curtis W. Tarr

Draft lotteries were conducted again from 1971 to 1975 (for those born between 1952 and 1956). The birth year of 1952 was the last draftees, with the assigned number 95 being the last number drafted, which represented those born on July 20, 1952. The draft numbers issued from 1972 to 1975 were not used to call any men into service as the last draft call was on December 7, 1972, and authority to induct expired July 1, 1973. They were used, however, to call some men born from 1953 to 1956 for armed forces physical examinations. The highest number called for a physical was 215 (for tables 1970 through 1976).

== See also ==
- Conscription in the United States
