= Robert W. Gambino =

American politician

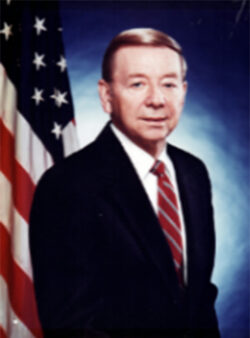

8th Director of the Selective Service System
- In office March 8, 1991 – January 31, 1994
- President: George H. W. Bush; Bill Clinton
- Preceded by: Samuel K. Lessey Jr.
- Succeeded by: Gil Coronado

Personal details
- Born: November 16, 1926 Martinsburg, West Virginia
- Died: July 26, 2012 (aged 85) Herndon, Virginia
- Party: Republican

Robert W. Gambino (November 16, 1926 – July 26, 2012) was an American administrator who served as the Director of the Selective Service System from 1991 to 1994.

He died on July 26, 2012, in Herndon, Virginia at age 85.
