= Lawrence Romo =

American civil servant

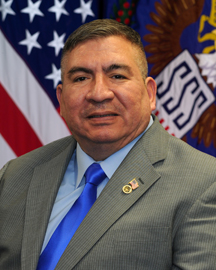

12th Director of the Selective Service System
- In office December 4, 2009 – January 20, 2017
- President: Barack Obama
- Preceded by: William A. Chatfield; Ernest E. Garcia (acting)
- Succeeded by: Don Benton; Adam J. Copp (acting)

Personal details
- Born: July 13, 1956 (age 70) San Antonio, Texas, U.S.
- Education: United States Air Force Academy (B.S.); Montana State University–Northern (M.Ed)
- Nickname: Larry

Military service
- Allegiance: United States
- Branch/service: United States Air Force
- Rank: Lieutenant colonel

Lawrence Guzman Romo (born July 13, 1956) is an American civil servant and former United States Air Force officer. He served as 12th director of the Selective Service System in the Obama administration. He is a former National Commander of the American GI Forum, and served from August 2018 to August 2021. He is the current American GI Forum National Legislative Director and was appointed by Congressman Adam Smith to serve on the Base Naming Commission until October 2022.

== Early life and education ==
Romo was born and raised in San Antonio, Texas and earned his Bachelor of Science degree from the United States Air Force Academy in 1978 and a Master of Education degree from Northern Montana College in 1983.

== Military career ==
Romo served in various assignments for the United States Air Force, both on active duty and in the reserve. He served as a United States Air Force Academy admissions advisor in various positions, supporting the operation of the Minuteman Missile Weapon and Launch System, in training operations, and as an air transportation officer. Upon retiring from the U.S. Air Force Reserve as a lieutenant colonel, Romo was the USAF Academy liaison officer director for South Texas. He joined the United States Civil Service Commission in 1987, serving from 1987 until 1992 as an item manager for the Directorate of Special Weapons, and from 1992 through 1999, as the transition assistance program specialist at the Kelly Field Annex. He also served as the chairman of Bexar County Veterans Committee and a member of the American Legion, American GI Forum, Association of United States Army, and the Military Officers Association of America. He served as chairman of the San Antonio Commission for Children and Families for the City of San Antonio, Texas.

Prior to being Selective Service System director, he was the soldier and family assistance program manager for the United States Army Recruiting Command.

== Director of the Selective Service System ==
While director of the Selective Service System, Romo supervised the agency that registers all United States citizens and foreign nationals living in the United States who are male (except prisoners and mental hospital patients) and who are between 18 and 26 years of age.

Romo's term as director ended with the Obama administration, and he was replaced by Adam J. Copp, who served on an interim basis. President Donald Trump later selected former Member of the Washington State Senate, Don Benton, who took office in April 2017.

Political offices
Preceded by Ernest E. Garcia; Acting	Director of the Selective Service System; 2009–2017	Succeeded by Adam J. Copp; Acting
