= Lewis Blaine Hershey =

United States Army general (1893–1977)

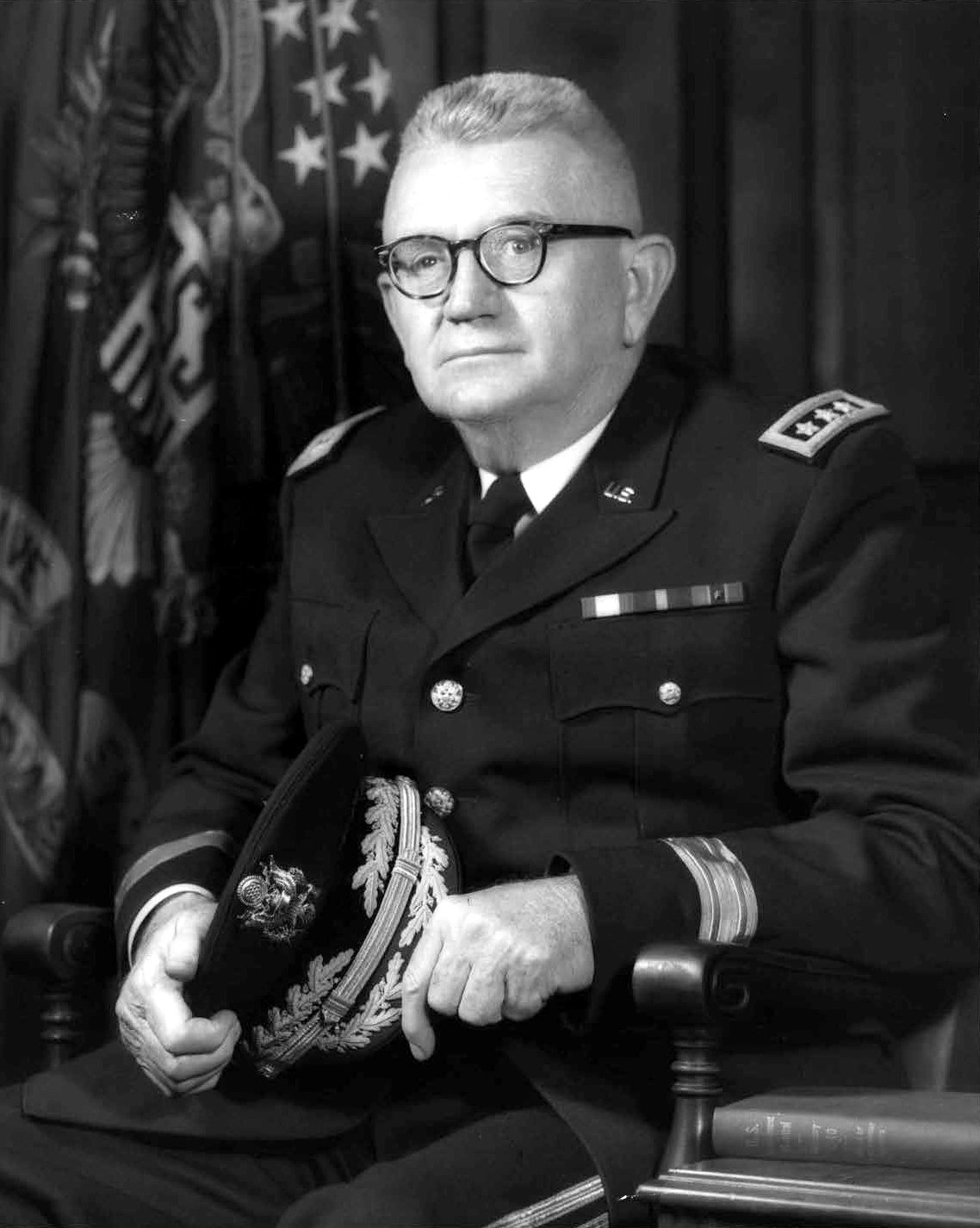
- Hershey in 1958

2nd Director of the Selective Service System
- In office 31 July 1941 – 15 February 1970
- President: Franklin D. Roosevelt; Harry S. Truman; Dwight D. Eisenhower; John F. Kennedy; Lyndon B. Johnson; Richard Nixon
- Preceded by: Clarence Addison Dykstra
- Succeeded by: Curtis W. Tarr; Dee Ingold (acting)

Personal details
- Born: 12 September 1893 Steuben County, Indiana, U.S.
- Died: 20 May 1977 (aged 83) Angola, Indiana, U.S.

Military service
- Allegiance: United States
- Branch/service: United States Army
- Years of service: 1911–1920 (National Guard); 1920–1973 (Army)
- Rank: General
- Unit: Indiana National Guard
- Commands: Director, Selective Service System
- Battles/wars: Border War; World War I World War II; Korean War; Vietnam War

Lewis Blaine Hershey (12 September 1893 – 20 May 1977) was a United States Army general who served as the 2nd Director of the Selective Service System, the means by which the United States administers its military conscription.

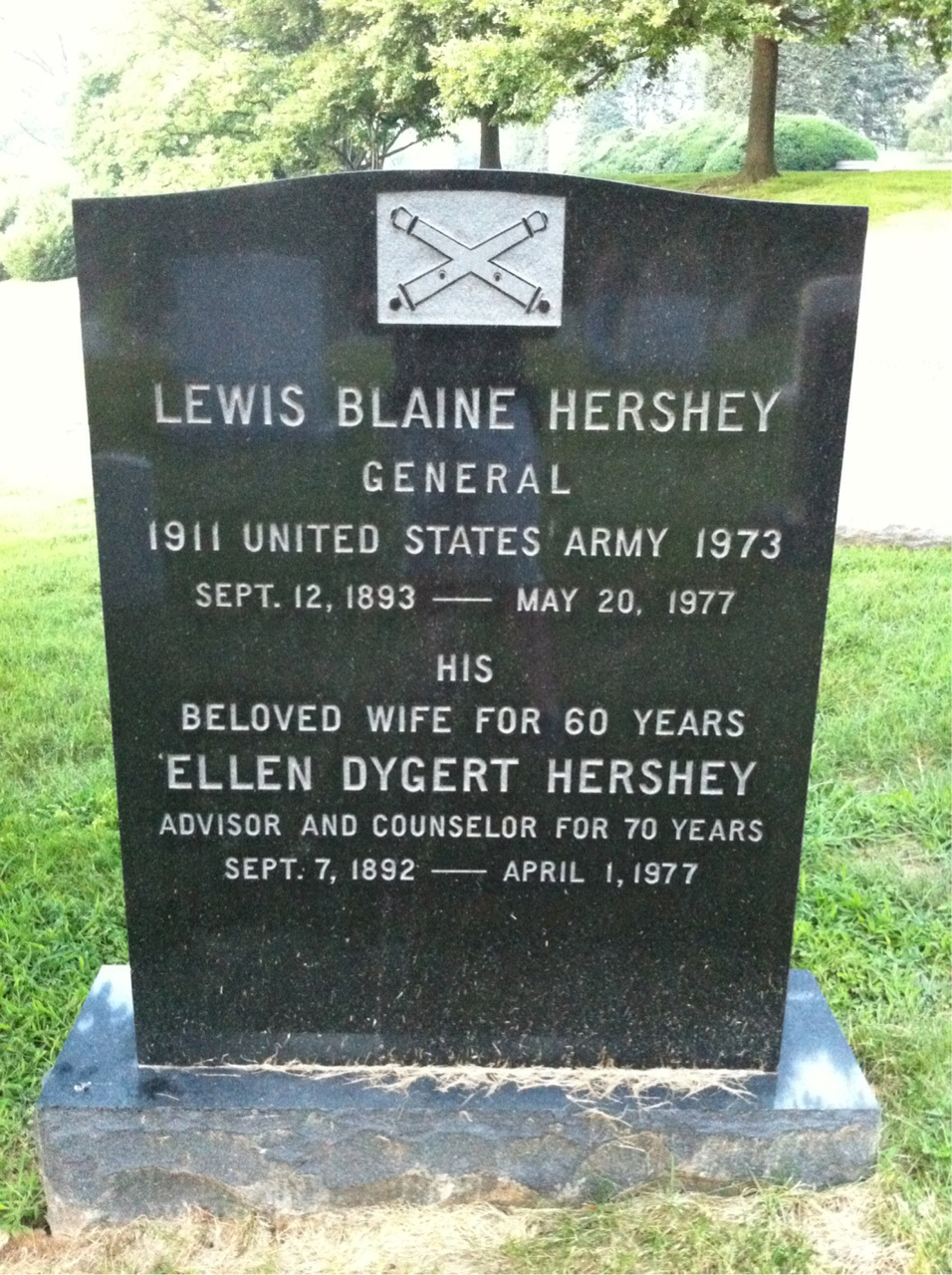
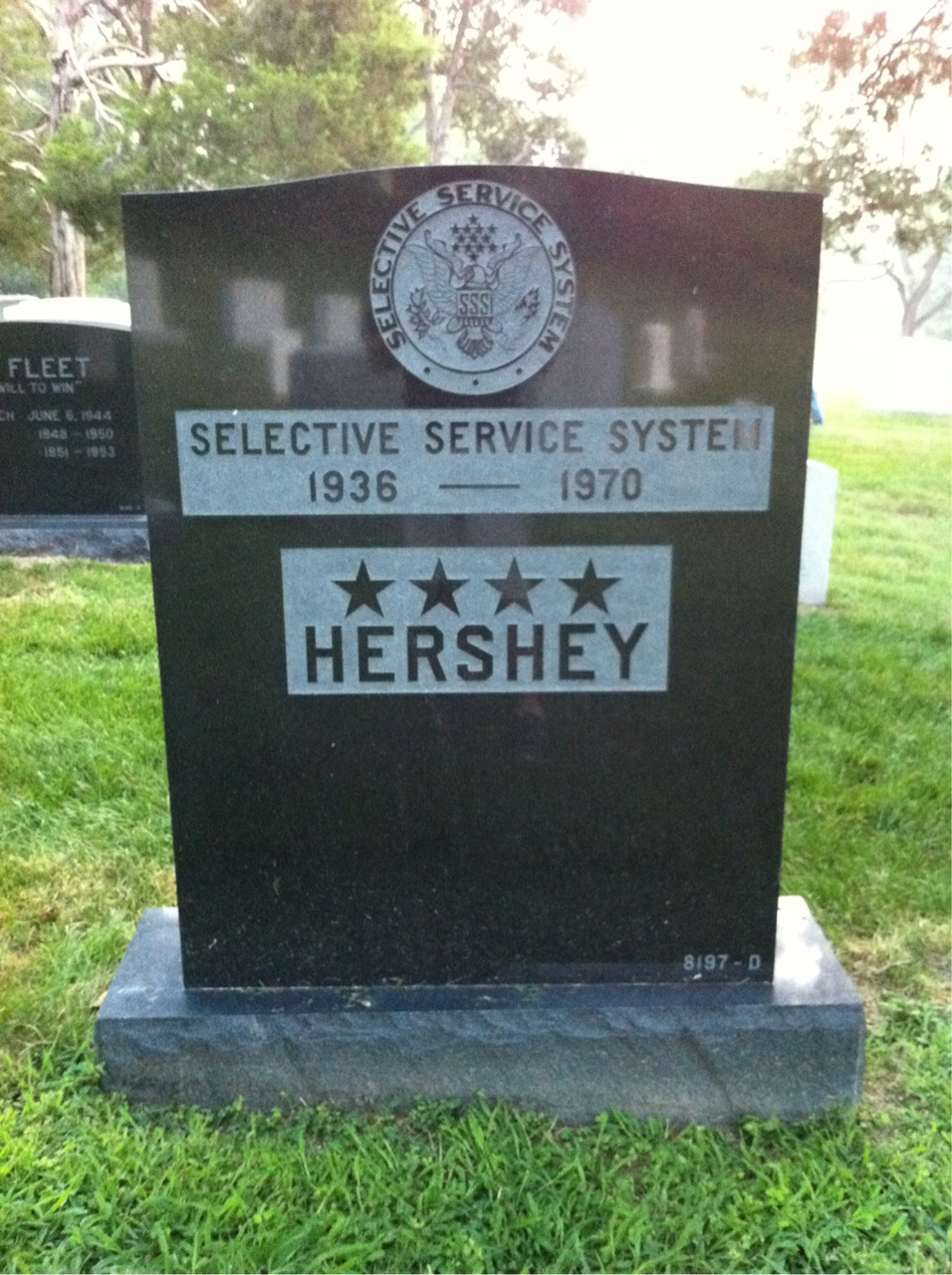
Grave at Arlington National Cemetery

== Early life ==
He was born in Steuben County, Indiana, son of Latta Freleigh Hershey (1858–1938) and Rosetta Caroline Richardson (1862–1898). He attended the local public schools and graduated from Tri-State College (now Trine University) in 1914 receiving a degree in education. He taught at local elementary schools and served as a school principal in Indiana.

He married Ellen Dygert (1892–1977) and had four children: Kathryn, Gilbert, George, and Ellen.

== Military ==
Hershey enlisted in the Indiana National Guard in 1911. Hershey received a direct commission as a second lieutenant in 1913. In 1916, his guard unit was called to active duty on the Mexican border. The unit was relieved in December 1916. His unit was again called to federal service during World War I and sent to France with the American Expeditionary Force.

Hershey was raised a Master Mason in Northeastern Lodge 210, Fremont, Indiana, in 1916.

After the war, Hershey remained in the National Guard until he received a regular commission as a captain in the Regular Army in 1920. He attended the Command and General Staff College and the Army War College. Hershey taught military science at the Ohio State University and then served in the general staff as G-4 at the Department of Hawaii.

=== Career ===
In 1936, he was assigned to the General Staff in Washington, DC. In October 1940, President Franklin Roosevelt promoted him to brigadier general and named him executive officer of the Selective Service System. On 31 July 1941, President Roosevelt named Hershey director of the Selective Service. In 1942, Hershey was promoted to major general. In 1943, he received an honorary degree in Doctor of Laws from Oglethorpe University. While officially retiring on 31 December 1946, he was retained on active duty starting the next day.

He was the longest-serving director in the history of the Selective Service System, and held the position until 15 February 1970, spanning World War II, the Korean War and the Vietnam War.

Hershey was promoted to lieutenant general in 1956 and to four-star general on 23 December 1969.

On 24 October 1967, in response to increasing demonstrations against military recruiting on college campuses, Hershey issued Local Board Memorandum No. 85, since known as the Hershey Directive, which recommended that when a draft card was abandoned or mutilated that registrant should be declared "a delinquent for failure to have the card in his possession" and then be reclassified as available for service. Two days later, he sent a letter to local boards suggesting that violators of any portion of the Selective Service Act or Regulations be treated as delinquent. Notably, he said that such violations included "illegal activity which interferes with recruiting," which was assumed to mean demonstrating against military recruiters. Unlike the Memorandum, the letter was unofficial. This order outraged students, many of whom were not subject to being drafted due to education deferments, and campus demonstrations against the war (and Hershey's order) increased. Various Supreme Court cases voided the Memorandum, and after one of them Hershey withdrew it with Memorandum No. 101, on 21 January 1970. The most explicit overruling of the Memorandum and Letter came in a decision from the United States Court of Appeals Third Circuit in Bucher v. Selective Service System on 2 January 1970, which ruled that there is "no statutory authorization for such reclassification," but did not rule on First Amendment issues:

Since we have reached the conclusion that the delinquency reclassifications here are invalid for the separate and independent reasons that (1) they violate the constitutional procedural due process guarantees of the Fifth and Sixth Amendments, and (2) they lack statutory authorization, we find it unnecessary to advert to the plaintiffs' contention that the reclassifications violate their First Amendment rights.

(Many online articles erroneously refer to Bucher v. Selective Service System as a Supreme Court decision.)

The controversy over the Hershey Directive led to calls for his retirement. On 10 October 1969 president Richard Nixon announced that Hershey would leave the office of Director of the Selective Service on 16 February 1970. Nixon appointed Hershey as Presidential Advisor for Manpower Mobilization effective the day after Hershey left his position with the Selective Service.

== Retirement ==
As required by law, Hershey was involuntarily retired from the Army on 10 April 1973, at the age of 79, as a four-star general. He was one of the very few members of the U.S. Army to be allowed to serve beyond the mandatory retirement age of 64 since it was established shortly after the American Civil War.

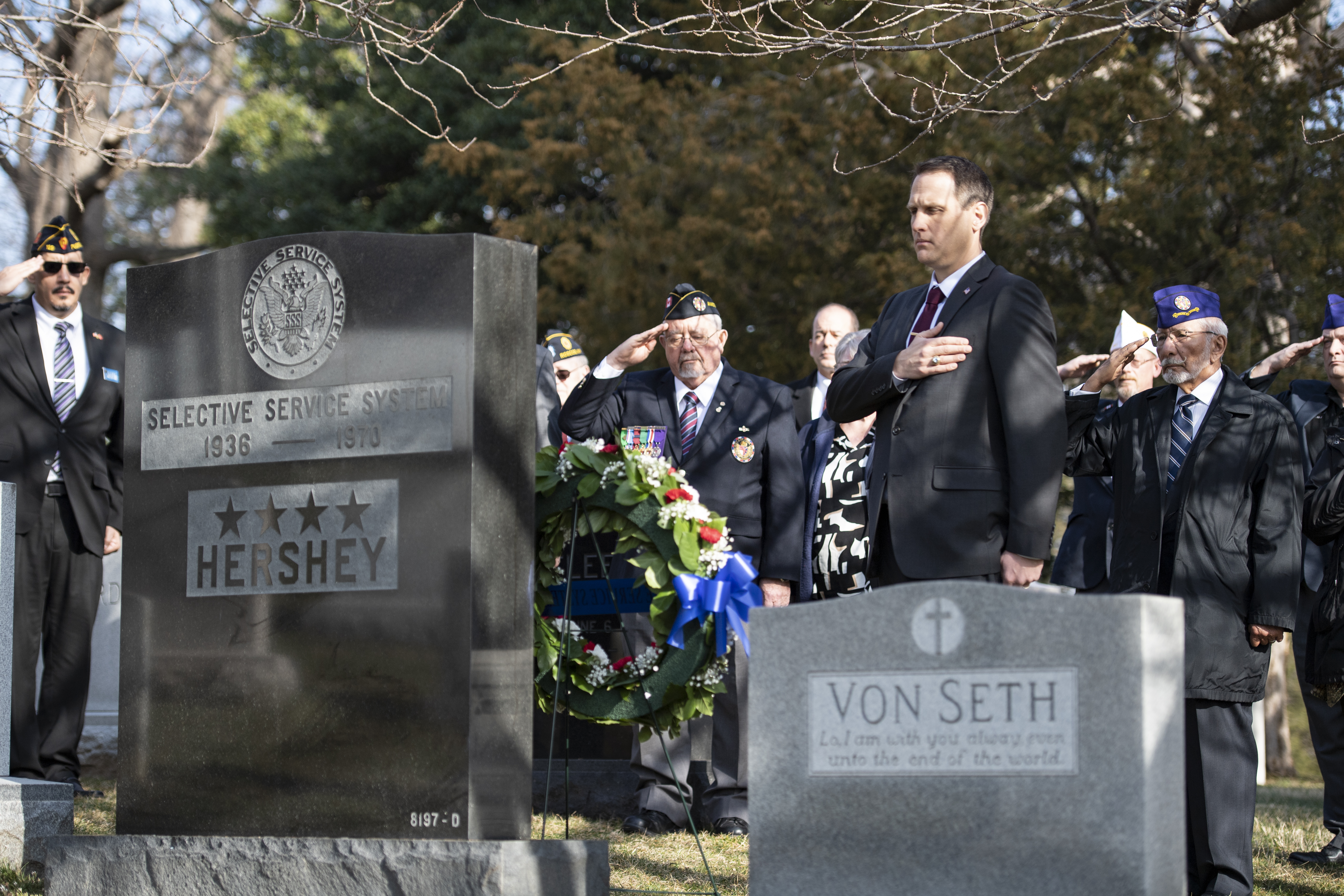
The American Legion holds a General Hershey Remembrance Ceremony at Arlington National Cemetery on 26 February 2024

Hershey died in Angola, Indiana on 20 May 1977 (only a month after his wife's death) and he is interred in Section 7 of Arlington National Cemetery.

Hershey was a recipient of the prestigious Silver Buffalo Award from the Boy Scouts of America. He was a Scout leader and executive in Washington, DC. His previous awards from the Boy Scouts included the Silver Beaver Award and the Silver Antelope Award.

General Hershey was one of only six generals in the history of the United States Army to have served as a general during three major conflicts. The other five were Brevet Lieutenant General Winfield Scott (War of 1812, Mexican War and Civil War), General of the Army Douglas MacArthur (World War I, World War II and Korea), Lieutenant General Milton Reckord (World War II, Korea, Vietnam), Major General Leo Boyle (World War II, Korea, Vietnam), and General Lyman Lemnitzer. (Generals Reckord and Boyle were both long serving state adjutants general in the National Guard.) Hershey was also one of the few Army officers promoted to brigadier general without previously holding the rank of colonel.

== Awards and decorations ==
=== U.S. military decorations and service medals ===
Defense Distinguished Service Medal (1970)
Army Distinguished Service Medal (1946)
Navy Distinguished Service Medal
Mexican Border Service Medal
World War I Victory Medal
American Defense Service Medal
American Campaign Medal
World War II Victory Medal
National Defense Service Medal with oak leaf cluster

=== Non-governmental organization awards ===
Masonic Grand Lodge of Indiana

Caleb B. Smith Medal of Honor

Sons of the American Revolution

Gold Good Citizenship Medal (1967)

American Legion

Distinguished Service Medal (1946)
National Commanders Award (1963)

AMVETS

Silver Helmet Defense Award (1968)

Boy Scouts of America

Silver Buffalo Award
Silver Beaver Award
Silver Antelope Award

== Promotions ==
- Private, Indiana National Guard – 16 February 1911
- Corporal, Indiana National Guard – 10 June 1912
- Sergeant, Indiana National Guard – 28 May 1913
- 2nd Lieutenant, 3rd Infantry, Indiana National Guard – 17 June 1913
- 1st Lieutenant, 3rd Infantry, Indiana National Guard – 9 February 1916
- Captain, Indiana National Guard (temporary) – 27 May 1918 (Date of rank 10 May 1918)
- Captain, Field Artillery, Regular Army – 3 September 1920 (Date of rank 1 July 1920)
- Major, Field Artillery, Regular Army – 1 August 1935
- Lieutenant Colonel, Field Artillery, Regular Army – 12 September 1940
- Colonel – Never held
- Brigadier General, Army of the United States – 16 November 1940 (Date of rank 25 October 1940)
- Major General, Army of the United States – 28 April 1942
- Major General, Retired List – 31 December 1946 (Returned to active duty the next day)
- Lieutenant General, Retired List – 23 June 1956
- General, Retired List – 23 December 1969
- Released from Active Duty - 10 April 1973

== See also ==
- General Hershy Bar – Parody of Hershey, a satirical character of the Vietnam War-era protest movement.
