= Alfred V. Rascon =

Medal of Honor recipient

Alfred Rascon
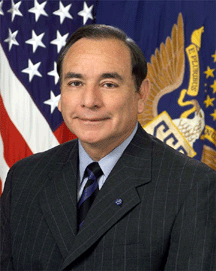

10th Director of the Selective Service System
- In office May 24, 2001 – January 2, 2003
- President: George W. Bush
- Preceded by: Gil Coronado
- Succeeded by: William A. Chatfield; Lewis C. Brodsky (acting)

Personal details
- Born: September 10, 1945 (age 80) Chihuahua, Mexico
- Spouse: Carol
- Nickname: "Doc"

Military service
- Allegiance: United States
- Branch/service: United States Army
- Years of service: 1963–1966; 1970–1984; 2002–2008
- Rank: Lieutenant Colonel
- Unit: 1st Battalion (Airborne), 503rd Infantry Regiment, 173rd Airborne Brigade
- Battles/wars: Vietnam War; War in Afghanistan; Iraq War
- Awards: Medal of Honor; Bronze Star Medal (3); Purple Heart (2)

Alfred Velazquez Rascon (born September 10, 1945) is a retired United States Army lieutenant colonel. In 2000, he was awarded the Medal of Honor—the United States' highest military decoration—for his actions as a medic near Long Khánh Province during the Vietnam War.

On more than one occasion Rascon exposed himself to enemy fire and grenades by covering the bodies of those whom he was aiding with his own. In addition to Vietnam, Rascon also served as a medical officer in the wars in Afghanistan and Iraq.

== Early life ==
Rascon was born in Chihuahua, Mexico on September 10, 1945, as the only child of Alfredo and Andrea Rascon. The Rascon family, in search of a better life, emigrated to the United States. They settled in Oxnard, California, where Rascon received his primary and secondary education. In August 1963, he graduated from Oxnard High School and enlisted in the United States Army.

Rascon received his Basic training in Fort Ord, California, and after completing he was assigned to Fort Sam Houston, Texas for basic and specialist medical training. After he graduated from his medical training, he volunteered for airborne training and attended the Army's Airborne school in Fort Benning, Georgia.

== Vietnam War ==
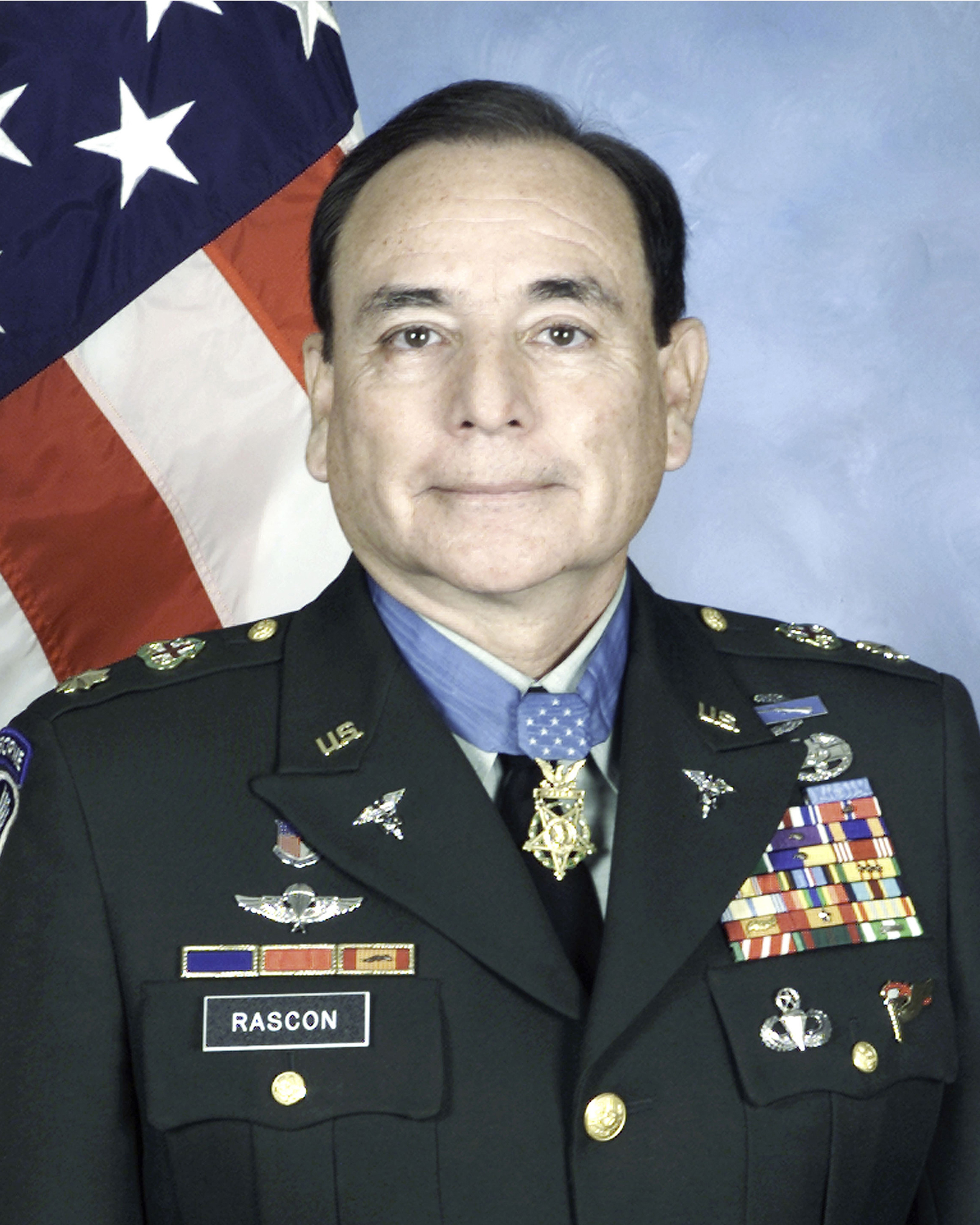
Alfred Rascon as a major

In February 1964, Rascon was then assigned to Medical Platoon, Headquarters Company, 1st Battalion, 503rd Infantry (Airborne) of the 173rd Airborne Brigade (Separate) stationed in Okinawa.

In May 1965, Rascon and his unit were deployed to the Republic of Vietnam where he served as a medic for a platoon of paratroopers. The brigade was the first major ground combat unit of the United States Army to serve there. They were the first to go into War Zone D to destroy enemy base camps and to introduce the use of small long-range patrols.

On March 16, 1966, Rascon was assigned as a medic to a Reconnaissance Platoon of the 173rd Airborne Brigade. The Reconnaissance Platoon's mission was to reinforce a sister battalion which was under intense enemy attack near Long Khánh Province, when it found itself under heavy fire from a numerically superior enemy force. Several point squad soldiers were wounded and Specialist Four Rascon made his way forward to aid his fallen comrades. In more than one occasion Rascon exposed himself to enemy fire and grenades by covering the bodies of those whom he was aiding and absorbing the blast and fragments of the grenades with his own body. Each time he would drag his comrades to safety and crawled back to aid someone else. Rascon was so badly wounded that day that he was given his last rites.

Rascon was transferred to Johnson Army Hospital in Japan where he spent six months recovering from his wounds. For his actions, he was nominated for the Medal of Honor. However, his nomination for some unknown reason did not go through and instead he was awarded a Silver Star. In May 1966, he was honorably discharged from active duty and placed in the Army Reserves. Rascon attended college after he was discharged and in 1967 he became a Naturalized United States Citizen.

In 1970 Rascon graduated from the Army's Infantry Officers Candidate School and was commissioned as a second lieutenant of Infantry. He then returned to Vietnam for a second tour, this time as a military adviser. In 1976, Rascon was once again honorably discharged from active duty with the rank of captain, but continued serving in the United States Army Reserve until 1984.

=== Post-Vietnam ===
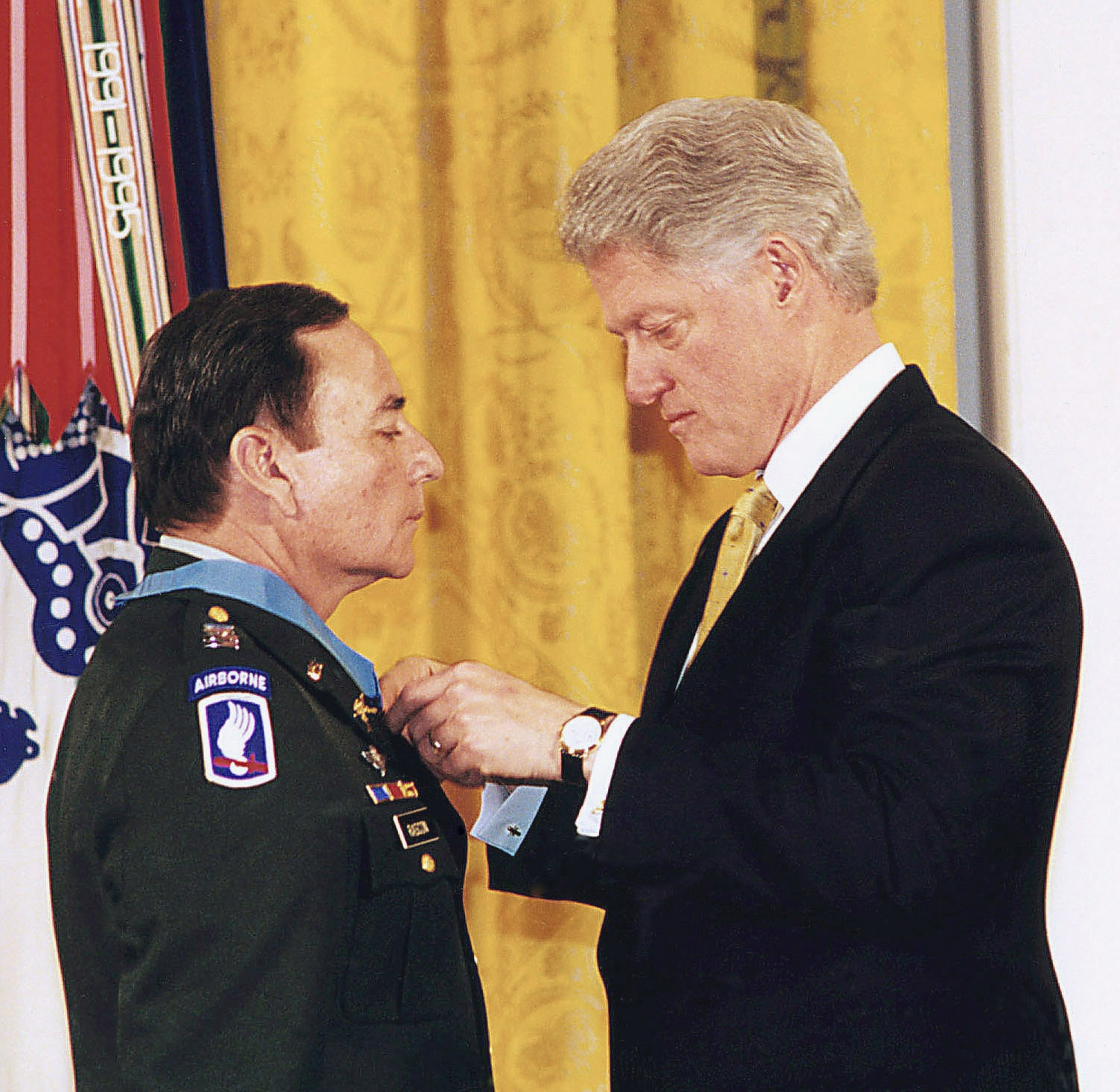
President Clinton presents the Medal of Honor to Rascon in a 2000 ceremony

In 1976, Rascon was offered the position of United States Army military liaison officer, in the Republic of Panama and he accepted. Rascon has also worked for the Department of Justice's, Drug Enforcement Administration, INTERPOL (U.S. National Central Bureau), and the Immigration & Naturalization Service.

During a 1985 reunion of the 173rd Airborne Brigade, Rascon's comrades discovered that he never received the Medal of Honor. His former platoon members Ray Compton, Neil Haffey and Larry Gibson, whose lives he saved, sought to correct the oversight and renewed their efforts in favor of a Medal of Honor for Rascon. The Pentagon would not reconsider Rascon's case because so much time had elapsed. Therefore, Rascon's comrades sought the help of Congressman Lane Evans from Illinois. In 1997, Evans gave President Bill Clinton a packet containing the information about Rascon. The President then convinced the Pentagon to reopen the case. On February 8, 2000, President Bill Clinton bestowed upon Rascon the Medal of Honor in a ceremony held in the East Room of the White House.

== Medal of Honor ==
Medal of Honor citation:

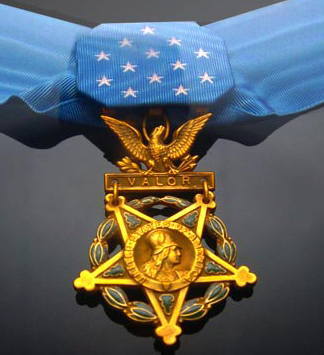
Medal of Honor

ALFRED V. RASCON

Rank and organization: Specialist Four, U.S. Army, Reconnaissance Platoon, Headquarters Company, 1st Battalion (Airborne), 503rd Infantry, 173rd Airborne Brigade (Separate)
Place and date: Republic of Vietnam, March 16, 1966
Entered service at: ----
Born: 1945, Chihuahua, Mexico

Specialist Four Alfred Rascon, distinguished himself by a series of extraordinarily courageous acts on March 16, 1966, while assigned as a medic to the Reconnaissance Platoon, Headquarters Company, 1st Battalion (Airborne), 503rd Infantry, 173rd Airborne Brigade (Separate). While moving to reinforce its sister battalion under intense enemy attack, the Reconnaissance Platoon came under heavy fire from a numerically superior enemy force. The intense enemy fire from crew-served weapons and grenades severely wounded several point squad soldiers. Specialist Rascon, ignoring directions to stay behind shelter until covering fire could be provided, made his way forward. He repeatedly tried to reach the severely wounded point machine-gunner laying on an open enemy trail, but was driven back each time by the withering fire. Disregarding his personal safety, he jumped to his feet, ignoring flying bullets and exploding grenades to reach his comrade. To protect him from further wounds, he intentionally placed his body between the soldier and enemy machine guns, sustaining numerous shrapnel injuries and a serious wound to the hip. Disregarding his serious wounds he dragged the larger soldier from the fire-raked trail. Hearing the second machine-gunner yell that he was running out of ammunition, Specialist Rascon, under heavy enemy fire crawled back to the wounded machine-gunner stripping him of his bandoleers of ammunition, giving them to the machine-gunner who continued his suppressive fire. Specialist Rascon fearing the abandoned machine gun, its ammunition and spare barrel could fall into enemy hands made his way to retrieve them. On the way, he was wounded in the face and torso by grenade fragments, but disregarded these wounds to recover the abandoned machine gun, ammunition and spare barrel items, enabling another soldier to provide added suppressive fire to the pinned-down squad. In searching for the wounded, he saw the point grenadier being wounded by small arms fire and grenades being thrown at him. Disregarding his own life and his numerous wounds, Specialist Rascon reached and covered him with his body absorbing the blasts from the exploding grenades, and saving the soldier's life, but sustaining additional wounds to his body. While making his way to the wounded point squad leader, grenades were hurled at the sergeant. Again, in complete disregard for his own life, he reached and covered the sergeant with his body, absorbing the full force of the grenade explosions. Once more Specialist Rascon was critically wounded by shrapnel, but disregarded his own wounds to continue to search and aid the wounded. Severely wounded, he remained on the battlefield, inspiring his fellow soldiers to continue the battle. After the enemy broke contact, he disregarded aid for himself, instead treating the wounded and directing their evacuation. Only after being placed on the evacuation helicopter did he allow aid to be given to him. Specialist Rascon's extraordinary valor in the face of deadly enemy fire, his heroism in rescuing the wounded, and his gallantry by repeatedly risking his own life for his fellow soldiers are in keeping with the highest traditions of military service and reflect great credit upon himself, his unit, and the United States Army.

— The 503^{d} P.R.C.T Heritage Battalion Online

== Later years ==
On May 22, 2002, Rascon was confirmed by the United States Senate as the 10th director of the Selective Service System; he served in this position until 2003.

On September 1, 2002, Rascon returned to the army as an Army Reserve major in the Army Medical Service Corps. His position was individual mobilization augmentee to the Surgeon General's Office. Rascon served in Afghanistan and Iraq with the Medical Service Corps. He retired from the military with the rank of lieutenant colonel.

== Honors ==
Rascon received the degree of Doctor of Medical Jurisprudence, Honoris Causa on May 17, 2003, from the Uniformed Services University of Health Sciences' (USUHS) F. Edward Hebert School of Medicine and Graduate School of Nursing. The army has honored Rascon by renaming their training school for medics at Fort Campbell, Kentucky, the Alfred V. Rascon School of Combat Medicine.

Rascon has been honored by the American Immigration Lawyers Association and Foundation in Washington, D.C., for his past contributions in the military. The Washington-based CATO Institute also honored him in its annual honors of past and present military contributors of Hispanic Americans. He resides in Laurel, Maryland and is married and has a daughter and a son.

== Awards and recognitions ==
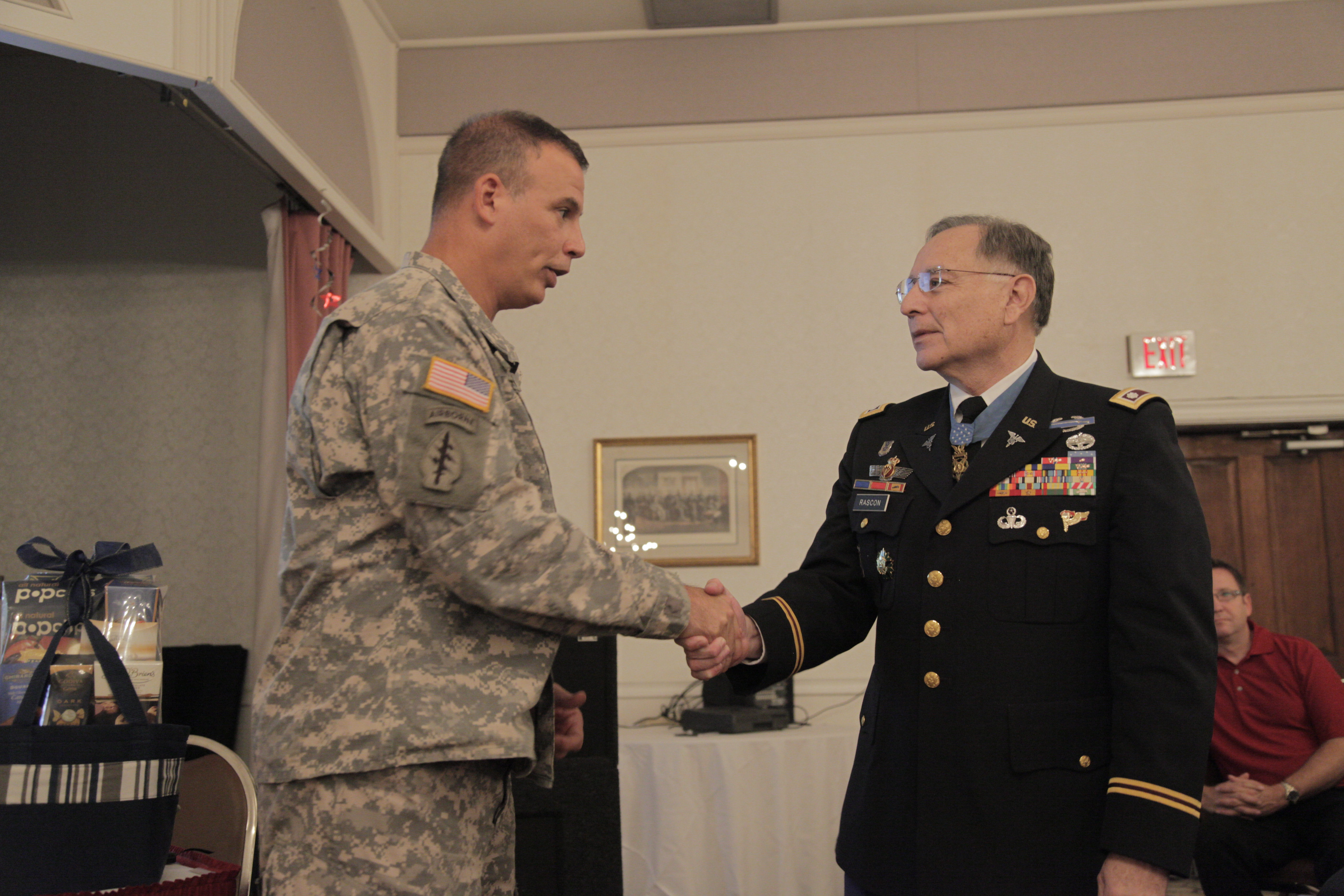
Rascon in 2011

Among Alfred V. Rascon's decorations and medals are the following:

	Combat Infantryman Badge
	Combat Medical Badge (Second Award)
	Master Parachutist Badge
	Pathfinder Badge
	Expert Rifle Badge
	Army Staff Identification Badge
	173rd Airborne Brigade Combat Team Combat Service Identification Badge
	Republic of Vietnam Parachute Wings
	Spanish Parachute Wings
	503rd Infantry Regiment Distinctive Unit Insignia
	5 Overseas Service Bars
Bluebird-colored ribbon with five white stars in the form of an "M".	Medal of Honor
	Bronze Star Medal with "V" device and two bronze oak leaf clusters
	Purple Heart with oak leaf cluster
	Air Medal
Width-44 myrtle green ribbon with width-3 white stripes at the edges and five width-1 stripes down the center; the central white stripes are width-2 apart	Army Commendation Medal with "V" Device and two oak leaf clusters
	Army Presidential Unit Citation
	Army Meritorious Unit Commendation
	Selective Service System Distinguished Service Medal
	Selective Service System Exceptional Service Medal
	Army Good Conduct Medal
Width=44 scarlet ribbon with a central width-4 golden yellow stripe, flanked by pairs of width-1 scarlet, white, Old Glory blue, and white stripes	National Defense Service Medal with two bronze service stars
	Armed Forces Expeditionary Medal
	Vietnam Service Medal with three service stars
	Afghanistan Campaign Medal
	Iraq Campaign Medal
	Global War on Terrorism Expeditionary Medal
	Armed Forces Reserve Medal with "M" device
Width-44 ribbon with width-6 central ultramarine blue stripe, flanked by pairs of stripes that are respectively width-4 emerald, width-3 golden yellow, width-5 orange, and width-7 scarlet	Army Service Ribbon
Width-44 ribbon with width-8 central brick stripe, flanked by pairs of stripes that are respectively width-2 golden yellow, width-10 grotto blue, and width-6 national flag blue	Army Overseas Service Ribbon
	Vietnam Gallantry Cross with Palm and Gold Star
	Vietnam Armed Forces Honor Medal, 1st class
	Vietnam Staff Service Medal, 1st class
	Vietnam Civil Actions Medal, 1st class
	Vietnam Gallantry Cross Unit Citation
	Vietnam Campaign Medal

== See also ==
- List of Medal of Honor recipients for the Vietnam War
- Hispanic Medal of Honor recipients
