= Curtis W. Tarr =

President of Lawrence University from 1963 to 1969

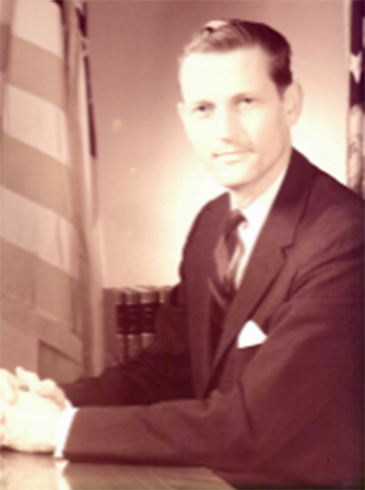

1st Under Secretary of State for International Security Affairs
- In office May 2, 1972 – November 25, 1973
- President: Richard Nixon
- Preceded by: Position established
- Succeeded by: William H. Donaldson

3rd Director of the Selective Service System
- In office April 6, 1970 – May 1, 1972
- President: Richard Nixon
- Preceded by: Lewis Blaine Hershey; Dee Ingold (acting)
- Succeeded by: Byron V. Pepitone

Personal details
- Born: September 18, 1924 Stockton, California, U.S.
- Died: June 21, 2013 (aged 88) Walnut Creek, California, U.S.
- Party: Republican
- Education: Stanford University (B.A.); Harvard University (M.B.A.); Stanford University (Ph.D., History)
- Occupation: Academician, administrator, advisor

Curtis William Tarr (September 18, 1924 – June 21, 2013) was an American academic best known for his role in the reform of the Selective Service System—in particular, of the draft lottery, which had been criticized for being insufficiently random. Tarr also served as the seventh dean of the S.C. Johnson Graduate School of Management at Cornell University, and as the twelfth president of Lawrence University in Appleton, Wisconsin.

Tarr earned his B.A. from Stanford University, his M.B.A. from Harvard University and returned to Stanford to earn his Ph.D. in American history.

Tarr served in the United States Army during the Second World War and began his academic career as a lecturer and assistant dean of humanities at Stanford. In 1958, he ran unsuccessfully as a Republican candidate, for California's 2nd congressional district in the U.S. House of Representatives.

Between 1963 and 1969, he was President of Lawrence University. He negotiated Lawrence's merger with Milwaukee-Downer College, increasing the endowment from $7,000,000 to $20,000,000. Toward the end of his Lawrence presidential term, he negotiated Vietnam-era tensions, creating the Lawrence University Community Council in 1968.

Tarr returned to government service in 1969, as an Assistant Secretary of the Air Force for Manpower and Reserve Affairs. He was subsequently promoted to director of the Selective Service System, replacing the controversial Lewis Hershey; historian David L. Schalk has referred to Tarr in this role as an "inoffensive bureaucrat".

He then served as Under Secretary of State for Security Assistance and Acting Deputy Under Secretary of State for Management.

After his second phase of government service, Tarr was vice president for management development at Deere & Company, Moline, Illinois, a farm equipment manufacturer, until 1984, when he was selected to be Dean of the Johnson School, succeeding David A. Thomas.

Tarr was the author of Private Soldier: Life in the Army from 1943–1946 and of numerous articles in professional journals, including Air University Review. The Curtis Tarr Scholarship of the Johnson School, a two-year merit-based award, is named in his honor.

Tarr died on June 21, 2013.

== Links ==
- Official Biography
