= Byron V. Pepitone =

American politician (1918–2003)

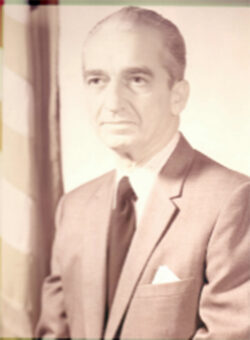

4th Director of the Selective Service System
- In office May 1, 1972 – July 31, 1977
- President: Richard Nixon; Gerald Ford; Jimmy Carter
- Preceded by: Curtis W. Tarr
- Succeeded by: Robert E. Shuck

Personal details
- Born: June 9, 1918 New Brunswick, New Jersey
- Died: September 11, 2003 (aged 85) Port St. Lucie, Florida
- Party: Republican

Byron V. Pepitone (June 9, 1918 – September 11, 2003) was an American administrator who served as the Director of the Selective Service System from 1972 to 1977.

He died on September 11, 2003, in Port St. Lucie, Florida at age 85.
