= Selective Service System =

American conscription system

Agency overview
- Formed: 18 May 1917
- Employees: (2017): 124 full-time civilians, 56 part-time civilian directors, 175 part-time reserve force officers (in peacetime), up to 11,000 part-time volunteers
- Annual budget: $31.3 million (FY 2024)
- Agency executive: Craig T. Brown, Director (acting)
- Website: sss.gov

The Selective Service System (SSS) is an independent agency of the United States government that maintains a database of registered male U.S. citizens and other U.S. residents potentially subject to military conscription ("the draft").

Although the U.S. military is currently an all-volunteer force, registration is still required for contingency planning and preparation for two types of draft: a general draft based on registration lists of males aged 18–25 years old and a special-skills draft based on professional licensing lists of workers in specified health care occupations. In the event of either type of draft, the Selective Service System would send out induction notices, adjudicate claims for deferments or exemptions, and assign draftees classified as conscientious objectors to alternative service work.

All male U.S. citizens and immigrant non-citizens who are between the ages of 18 and 25 are required by law to have registered within 30 days of their 18th birthdays and must notify the Selective Service within ten days of any changes to any of the information they provided on their registration cards, such as a change of address. The Selective Service System is a contingency mechanism in the event conscription becomes necessary.

Beginning on December 18, 2026, the requirement for male U.S. citizens and residents ages 18 through 25 to register themselves with the Selective Service System will be replaced with a requirement for the Selective Service System to register them "automatically" on the basis of other federal government databases. This results from a provision of the Fiscal Year 2026 National Defense Authorization Act.

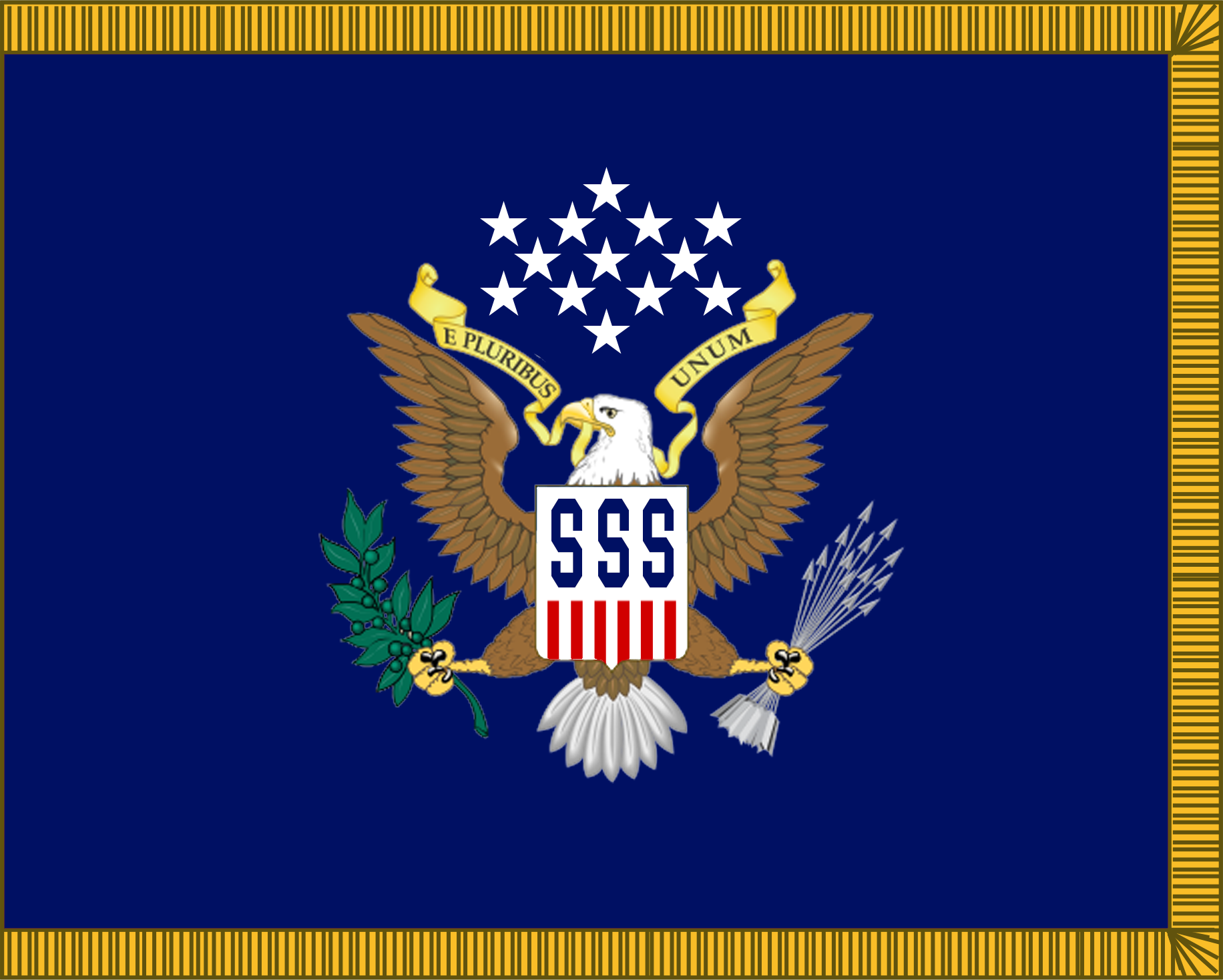
Selective Service System Flag

Registration with Selective Service may be required for various federal programs and benefits, including job training, federal employment, and naturalization.

The Selective Service System provides the names of all registrants to the Joint Advertising Marketing Research and Studies (JAMRS) program for inclusion in the JAMRS Consolidated Recruitment Database. The names are distributed to the services for recruiting purposes on a quarterly basis.

Regulations are codified at Title 32 of the Code of Federal Regulations, Chapter XVI.

== History ==
The former seal of the Selective Service System

=== 1917 to 1920 ===
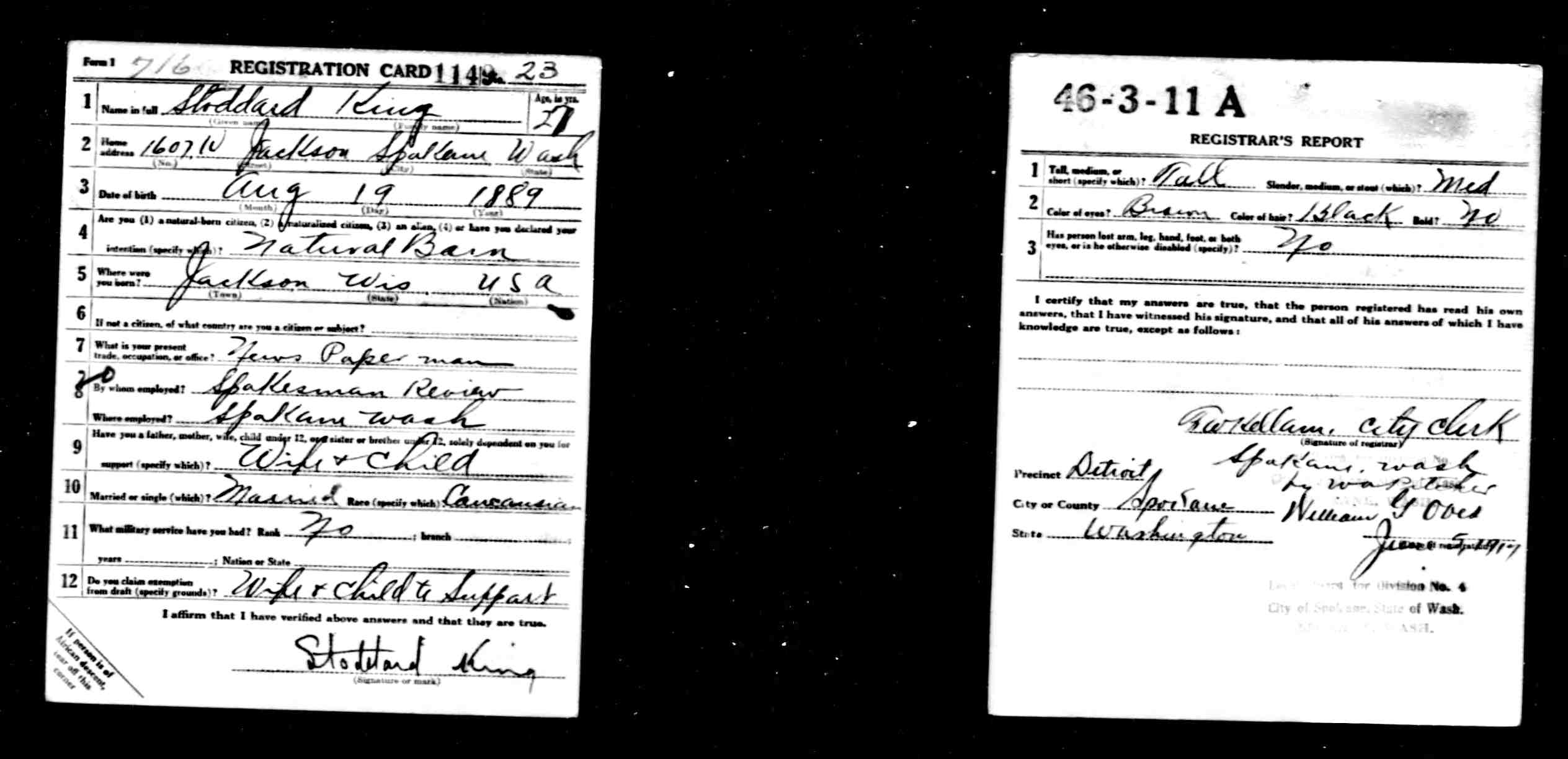
World War I draft card. Lower left corner to be removed by men of African ancestry to keep the military segregated

Following the U.S. declaration of war against Germany on 6 April, the Selective Service Act of 1917 (40 Stat. 76) was passed by the 65th United States Congress on 18 May 1917, creating the Selective Service System. President Woodrow Wilson signed the act into law after the U.S. Army failed to meet its target of expanding to 1 million men after six weeks. The act gave the president the power to conscript men for military service. All men aged 21 to 30 were required to enlist for military service for a 12-month period. As of mid-November 1917, all registrants were placed in one of five new classifications. Men in Class I were the first to be drafted, and men in lower classifications were deferred. Dependency deferments for registrants who were fathers or husbands were especially widespread. The age limit was later raised in August 1918 to a maximum age of 45. The military draft was discontinued in 1920.

=== 1940 to 1947 ===
Conflict	Dates active	Number of wartime draftees
World War I	September 1917 – November 1918	2,810,296
World War II	November 1940 – October 1946	10,110,104
Korean War	June 1950 – June 1953	1,529,539
Vietnam War	August 1964 – February 1973	1,857,304

Year	Total draftees
1917	516,212
1918	2,294,084
1940	18,633
1941	923,842
1942	3,033,361
1943	3,323,970
1944	1,591,942
1945	945,862
1946	183,383
1947	0
1948	20,348
1949	9,781
1950	219,771
1951	551,806
1952	438,479
1953	473,806
1954	253,230
1955	152,777
1956	137,940
1957	138,504
1958	142,246
1959	96,143
1960	86,602
1961	118,586
1962	82,060
1963	119,265
1964	112,386
1965	230,991
1966	382,010
1967	228,263
1968	296,406
1969	283,586
1970	162,746
1971	94,092
1972	49,514
1973	646

The Selective Training and Service Act of 1940 was passed by Congress on 16 September 1940, establishing the first peacetime conscription in United States history. It required all men between the ages of 18 and 64 to register with the Selective Service. To register, men typically completed a D.S.S. Form 1 Military Draft Registration Card from the Director of Selective Service. Over 49 million draft cards, including The Old Man's Draft, were completed.

It originally conscripted all men aged 21 to 35 for a service period of 12 months. In 1941, the military service period was extended to 18 months; later that year, the age bracket was increased to include men aged 18 to 37. In 1940, the act had registered 16 million men between the ages of 21 and 36. Following the Japanese attack on Pearl Harbor on 7 December 1941 and the subsequent declarations of war by the United States against the Empire of Japan and, a few days later, against Nazi Germany, the service period was extended in early 1942 to last for the duration of the war, plus a six-month service in the Organized Reserves. Until late 1942, the U.S. Navy and the Marine Corps relied only on volunteers, and all those drafted before late 1942 went only to the Army or the Army Air Corps. Of those called up for service during the war, nearly 2 million were rejected by the draft boards for "neuropsychiatric reasons." The most common "neuropsychiatric reason" was homosexuality, which was considered to be a mental illness in the 1940s, and as such, the military refused to accept homosexuals. Another four million were rejected for medical or educational reasons, such as being near-sighted, having rotten teeth, or being illiterate. Because too many men were rejected for health or education, the U.S. Army was forced to take remedial actions. During the war, 25,000 Army dentists pulled 15 million rotten teeth and placed 2.5 million sets of dentures while Army optometrists fitted 2.25 million men with eyeglasses. Nearly a million men took educational courses to teach them how to read and write. In November 1942, Congress passed the Tydings Amendment, exempting all agricultural workers from the draft, thereby sparing an estimated 2 million men from serving in the war.

The question of drafting African-American men caused much controversy, as President Franklin D. Roosevelt had promised several civil rights leaders in 1940 that the draft would be a color-blind one, and the Selective Service Act of 1940 stated "there shall be no discrimination against any person on the account of race or color." However, the U.S. military practiced segregation during the war, as African Americans did not serve alongside men of other races and in practice were only drafted to keep the all-black units of the Army, Navy, Marine Corps and Army Air Force up to strength. Furthermore, the military, as a general rule, preferred to use African-American servicemen only in menial roles and tried as much as possible to avoid sending African Americans into combat out of a belief that they were not brave enough. As such, the Army in particular did not form many divisions out of the African-American men drafted, which limited the number subject to the draft. Due to these practices, in early 1943, African-Americans made up 10.6% of the American population, but only 6% of the men serving in the military.

The issue of conscientious objectors was controversial during the war. In World War I, only the so-called "peace churches," namely the Mennonites, the Quakers, and the Brethren, had been allowed to reject national service on grounds of conscience. The 1940 Selective Service Act allowed the same exemption to the "peace churches" but also allowed anyone "who, because of religious training or belief, is conscientiously opposed to participation in war in any form." In practice, draft boards would exempt anyone who proved they were opposed to war on the grounds of some religious belief, which allowed more to claim conscientious objector status than had been the case in World War I. About 75,000 individuals claimed conscientious objector status; about half of these claims were accepted by the draft boards. Married men were exempt from the draft, and in late 1940, about 40% of those called up for the draft could evade it by promptly getting married. In February 1942, General Hershey, who was responsible for the draft, complained "that most of the recent marriages...might have been to evade the draft."

In his 1945 State of the Union address, President Franklin D. Roosevelt requested that the draft be expanded to include female nurses (male nurses were not allowed) to overcome a shortage that was endangering military medical care. This sparked a debate in the House of Representatives about the drafting of all women, which ultimately failed. The House passed a bill to draft nurses, but it died without a vote in the Senate. The publicity caused more nurses to volunteer, and agencies streamlined recruiting.

The Selective Service System created by the 1940 act was terminated by the act of 31 March 1947.

=== 1948 to 1969 ===
The Selective Service Act of 1948, enacted in June of that year, created a new and separate system, the basis for the modern system. All men 18 years and older had to register with the Selective Service. All men between the ages of 18 and 25 were eligible to be drafted for a service requirement of 21 months. This was followed by a commitment for either 12 consecutive months of active service or 36 consecutive months of service in the reserves, with a statutory term of military service set at a minimum of five years total. Conscripts could volunteer for military service in the regular United States Army for a term of four years or the Organized Reserves for a term of six years. Due to deep postwar budget cuts, only 100,000 conscripts were chosen in 1948. In 1950, the number of conscripts was greatly increased to meet the demands of the Korean War (1950–1953).

The outbreak of the Korean War led to the creation of the Universal Military Training and Service Act of 1951. This lowered the draft age from 19 to 18 1/2, increased active-duty service time from 21 to 24 months, and set the statutory term of military service at a minimum of eight years. Students attending a college or training program full-time could request an exemption, which was extended as long as they were students. A Universal Military Training clause was inserted that would have made all men obligated to perform 12 months of military service and training if the act were amended by later legislation. Despite successive attempts over the coming years, however, such legislation was never passed.

President John F. Kennedy issued Executive Order 11119 (signed on 10 September 1963), granting an exemption from conscription for married men between the ages of 19 and 26. His vice president and later successor as president, Lyndon B. Johnson, later rescinded the exemption for married men without children by Executive Order 11241 (signed on 26 August 1965 and going into effect at midnight on that date). However, married men with children or other dependents and men married before the executive order went into effect were still exempt. President Ronald Reagan revoked both of these exemptions with Executive Order 12553 in February 1986.

The Military Selective Service Act of 1967 expanded the ages of conscription to the ages of 18 to 55. It still granted student deferments but ended them upon either the student's completion of a four-year degree or his 24th birthday, whichever came first.

=== 1969 to 1975 ===
On 26 November 1969, President Richard Nixon signed an amendment to the Military Selective Service Act of 1967 that established conscription based on random selection (lottery). There were a total of seven draft lotteries between 1969 and 1975. The first draft lottery was held on 1 December 1969; it determined the order of call for induction during calendar year 1970, for registrants born between 1 January 1944 and 31 December 1950. The highest lottery number called for possible induction was 195. The second lottery, on 1 July 1970, pertained to men born in 1951. The highest lottery number called for possible induction was 125. The third was on 5 August 1971, pertaining to men born in 1952; the highest lottery number called was 95.

In 1971, the Military Selective Service Act was further amended to make registration compulsory; all men had to register within a period of 30 days before and 29 days after their 18th birthdays. Registrants were classified as 1-A (eligible for military service), 1-AO (conscientious objector available for non-combatant military service), and 1-O (conscientious objector available for alternate community service). Student deferments were ended, except for divinity students, who received a 2-D Selective Service classification. Men who were not classifiable as eligible for service due to a disqualification were classified 1-N. Men who were incapable of serving for medical or psychological unfitness were classified 4-F. Upon completion of military service, the classification of 4-A was assigned. Draft classifications of 1-A were changed to 1-H (registrant not currently subject to processing for induction) for men who were not selected for service after their draft eligibility year. These—and other—draft classifications were in place long before 1971. Also, requirements for draft board membership were reformed: the minimum age of board members was dropped from 30 to 18; members over 65 or who had served on the board for 20 or more years had to retire; and membership had to proportionally reflect the ethnic and cultural makeup of the local community.

On 27 January 1973, Secretary of Defense Melvin Laird announced the creation of an all-volunteer armed forces, negating the need for the military draft. The seventh and final lottery drawing was held on 12 March 1975, pertaining to men born in 1956, who would have been called to report for induction in 1976. But no new draft orders were issued after 1972.

=== 1975 to 1980 ===
On 29 March 1975, President Gerald Ford, whose own son, Steven, had earlier failed to register for the draft as required, signed Proclamation 4360 (Terminating Registration Procedures Under Military Selective Service Act), eliminating the registration requirement for all 18- to 25-year-old male citizens.

=== 1980 to 2026 ===
On 2 July 1980, President Jimmy Carter signed Proclamation 4771 (Registration Under the Military Selective Service Act) in response to the Soviet invasion of Afghanistan in 1979, retroactively re-establishing the Selective Service registration requirement for all 18- to 26-year-old male citizens born on or after 1 January 1960. As a result, only men born between 29 March 1957, and 31 December 1959, were completely exempt from Selective Service registration.

The first registrations following Proclamation 4771 occurred at various post offices across the nation on 21 July 1980 for men born in the calendar year 1960. Pursuant to the presidential proclamation, all those men born in 1960 were required to register that week. Men born in 1961 were required to register the following week. Men born in 1962 were required to register during the week beginning 5 January 1981. Men born in 1963 and after were required to register within 30 days before or after their 18th birthday.

A bill to abolish the Selective Service System was introduced in the United States House of Representatives on 10 February 2016. H.R. 4523 would end draft registration and eliminate the authority of the president to order anyone to register for the draft, abolish the Selective Service System, and effectively repeal the "Solomon Amendments" making registration for the draft a condition of federal student aid, jobs, and job training. The bill would leave in place, however, laws in some states making registration for the draft a condition of some state benefits. On 9 June 2016, a similar bill was introduced in the United States Senate, called the "Muhammad Ali Voluntary Service Act."

On 27 April 2016, the House Armed Services Committee voted to add an amendment to the National Defense Authorization Act for Fiscal Year 2017 to extend the authority for draft registration to women. On 12 May 2016, the Senate Armed Services Committee voted to add a similar provision to its version of the bill. If the bill including this provision had been enacted into law, it would have authorized (but not required) the president to order young women as well as young men to register with the Selective Service System.

The House-Senate conference committee for the National Defense Authorization Act for Fiscal Year 2017 removed the provision of the House version of the bill that would have authorized the president to order women as well as men to register with the Selective Service System but added a new section to create a "National Commission on Military, National, and Public Service" (NCMNPS). This provision was enacted into law on 23 December 2016 as Subtitle F of Public Law 114–328. The commission was to study and make recommendations by March 2020 on the draft, draft registration, registration of women, and "the feasibility and advisability of modifying the military selective service process in order to obtain for military, national, and public service individuals with skills (such as medical, dental, and nursing skills; language skills; cyber skills; and science, technology, engineering, and mathematics (STEM) skills) for which the Nation has a critical need, without regard to age or sex." During 2018 and 2019, the commission held both public and closed-door meetings with members of the public and invited experts and other witnesses.

In February 2019, Judge Gray H. Miller of the United States District Court for the Southern District of Texas heard a challenge to the Military Selective Service Act, which provides for the male-only draft, by the National Coalition for Men. Judge Miller deemed the act unconstitutional. Miller's opinion was based on the Supreme Court's past argument in Rostker v. Goldberg (1981), which had found the male-only draft constitutional because the military then did not allow women to serve. As the Department of Defense has since lifted most restrictions on women in the military, Miller ruled that the justifications no longer apply, and thus the act requiring only men to register would now be considered unconstitutional under the Equal Protection Clause. The government appealed this decision to the 5th Circuit Court of Appeals. Oral arguments on the appeal were heard on 3 March 2020. The District Court decision was reversed by the 5th Circuit Court of Appeals. A petition for review was declined by the U.S. Supreme Court.

In December 2019, the bipartisan "Selective Service Repeal Act," a bill to repeal the Military Selective Service Act and abolish the Selective Service System, H.R. 5492, was introduced in the U.S. House of Representatives by Representatives Peter DeFazio (D-OR) and Rodney Davis (R-IL). This bill was reintroduced in both the House (H.R. 2509) and the Senate (S. 1139) on 14 April 2021.

In January 2020, the Selective Service System website crashed following the U.S. airstrike on Baghdad International Airport. An Internet meme about the event being the beginning of World War III began gaining in popularity very quickly, causing an influx of visitors to the Selective Service System website, which was not prepared to handle it.

=== December 2026 and after ===
An "automatic" registration provision was included and enacted in Section 535 of the NDAA for fiscal year 2026. Beginning on December 18, 2026, the Selective Service System will be required to identify, locate, and register all male (as assigned at birth) U.S. citizens and residents 18 to 26 years old on the basis of other existing federal databases. Men will no longer be required to register themselves or be subject to penalties for failing to do so. This was noted to be the most significant change to Selective Service since the self-registration system began in 1980.

Regulations implementing and establishing procedures for "automatic" registration, including notices required for data collection, data matching, and data use, will need to be issued by the Selective Service System before "automatic" registration can be implemented. Proposed regulations for "automatic" registration were submitted by the SSS to the Office of Information and Regulatory Affairs (OIRA) on 30 March 2026, but withdrawn 23 July 2026.

In March 2026, a coalition of 45 antiwar, religious, feminist, and civil liberties organizations issued a joint statement opposing the automatic registration of individuals for a military draft and calling for repeal of the Military Selective Service Act.

== Who must register ==
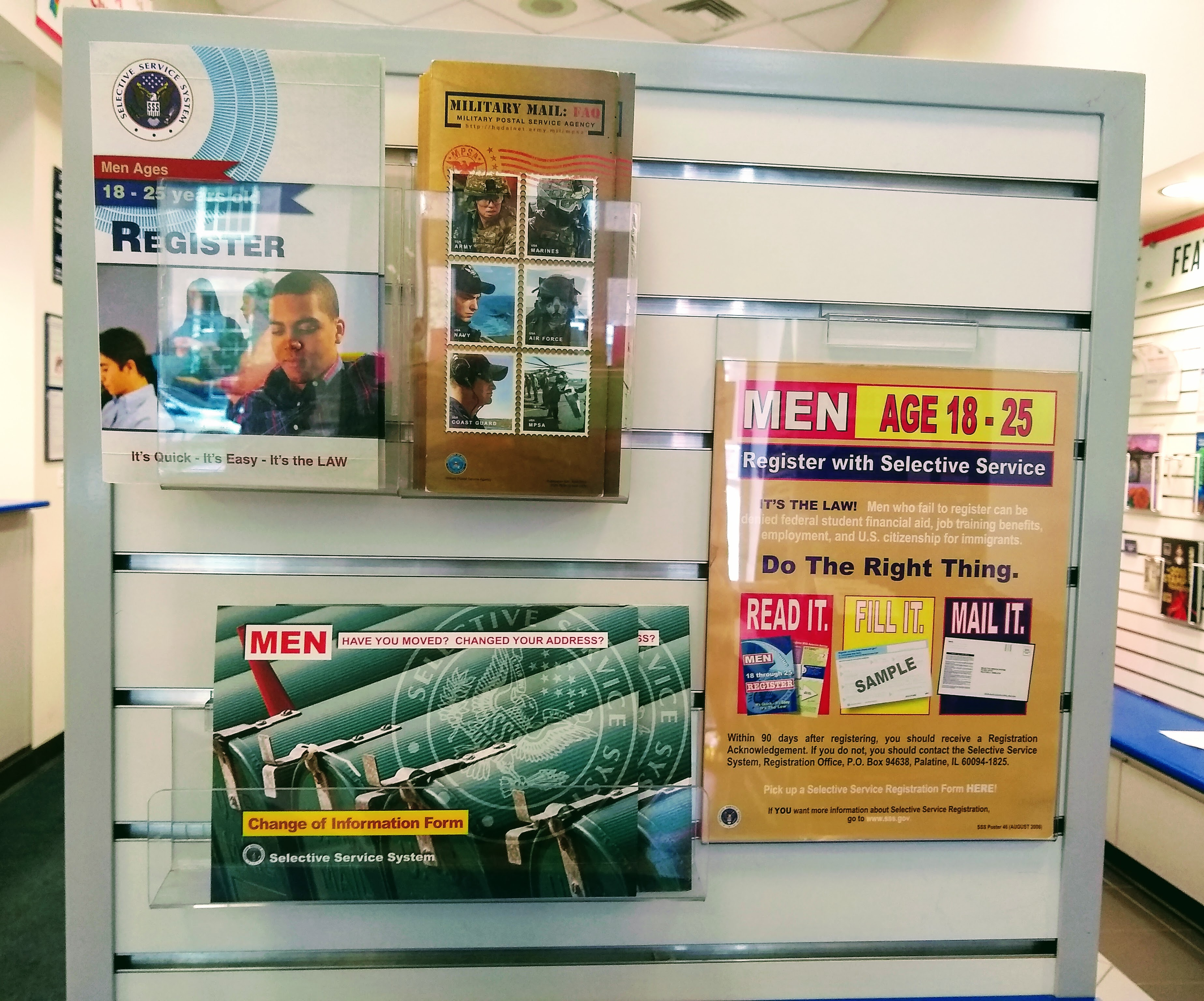
Selective service information available in a local post office in Boston, Massachusetts

Until December 18, 2026, all male U.S. citizens between 18 and 25 (inclusive) years of age are required to register within 30 days of their 18th birthdays. In addition, certain categories of non-U.S. citizen men between 18 and 25 living in the United States must register, particularly permanent residents, refugees, asylum seekers, and undocumented immigrants. Foreign men lawfully present in the United States who are non-immigrants, such as international students, visitors, and diplomats, are not required to register so long as they remain in that status. If an alien's non-immigrant status lapses while he is in the United States and under the age of 26, he will be required to register. Failure to register as required is grounds for denying a petition for U.S. citizenship. Currently, citizens who are at least 17 years and 3 months old can pre-register, so when they are eligible for registration, their information will automatically be added to the system.

In the self-registration system in effect through 2026, a person cannot indicate when they register that they intend to seek classification as a conscientious objector (CO) to war, but they may be able to make such a claim if drafted, depending on the law and regulations in effect at that time. Some people choose to write on the registration card "I am a conscientious objector to war" to document their conviction, even though the government will not have such a classification until there is a draft. A number of private organizations have programs for conscientious objectors to file a written record stating their beliefs.

Until their 26th birthdays, registered men must notify Selective Service within 10 days of any changes to information regarding their status, such as name, current mailing address, permanent residence address, and "all information concerning his status... which the classifying authority mails him a request therefor".

In 1987, Congress ordered the Selective Service System to put in place a system capable of drafting "persons qualified for practice or employment in a health care occupation" in case such a special-skills draft should be ordered by Congress. In response, the Selective Service published plans for the "Health Care Personnel Delivery System" (HCPDS) in 1989, and it has had them ready ever since. The concept underwent a preliminary field exercise in fiscal year 1998, followed by a more extensive nationwide readiness exercise in fiscal year 1999. The HCPDS plans include women and men age 20–54 in 57 job categories.

Since the early 1990s, the Selective Service System has also been considering the possibility of a "special skills draft" modeled on the HCPDS but including other occupations. In a January 2026 mobilization exercise, the first draftees would have included "computer network technicians, electronics technicians, aerospace engineers, divers, welders, gas turbine engine mechanics, electricians, heavy equipment operators, longshoremen, steel workers / pipefitters, radar / communications technicians, fiber optic technicians, mariners, aviation structural mechanics, cyber security specialists, robotics operators and technicians, air traffic controllers, logistics specialists, [and] linguists."

=== Gender ===
Selective Service bases the registration requirement on sex assigned at birth and enforces a binary interpretation of gender, including for intersex individuals. This is in line with Executive Order 14168, denying any legal recognition of transgender individuals' gender identities, social transition status, and medical transition status, as well as the legal existence of intersex individuals, which was issued on 20 January 2025. This policy is in spite of Executive Order 14183, which bans trans people from military service in the U.S. altogether.

Prior to 20 January 2025, individuals who were assigned male at birth were required to register regardless of their current gender identity or gender reassignment. This group included transgender women. Transgender men (individuals assigned female at birth who have transitioned or are transitioning to male) were not required to register. Individuals who identified as non-binary were required to register if they were assigned male at birth. U.S. citizens register for the SSS using their Social Security number and the sex designation associated with that number. It was possible to change the sex associated with a Social Security Number (SSN), and the Social Security Administration (SSA) did not require medical or legal evidence of a sex designation to do so. However, despite some states now allowing an "X" designation on official identification, like birth certificates, the current SSN system is only designed for male or female designations. On 31 January 2025, the SSA was given a memo to enforce a binary interpretation of sex, as noted in the aforementioned presidential executive order.

In February 2019, the male-only military draft registry was ruled to be unconstitutional by a federal district judge in National Coalition for Men v. Selective Service System. Following the ruling, Selective Service System attorney Jacob Daniels told reporters: "Things continue here at Selective Service as they have in the past, which is men between the ages of 18 and 25 are required to register with Selective Service. And at this time, until we receive guidance from either the court or from Congress, women are not required to register for Selective Service." On 13 August 2020, the federal district judge's opinion was unanimously overturned by the U.S. Court of Appeals for the 5th Circuit. The Court held that male-only military draft registration is constitutional on the basis that "only the Supreme Court may revise its precedent."

A congressionally mandated commission recommended in March 2020 that women should be eligible for the draft. In September 2021, the House of Representatives passed the National Defense Authorization Act for Fiscal Year 2022, which included an amendment that stated that "all Americans between the ages of 18 and 25 must register for selective service." This struck off the word "Male" which extended a potential draft to women; however, the amendment was removed before the National Defense Authorization Act was passed.

== Failure to register ==
In 1980, men who knew they were required to register but did not do so could face up to five years in prison, fines of up to $50,000 or both if convicted. The potential fine was later increased to $250,000. Despite these possible penalties, government records indicate that from 1980 through 1986 there were only twenty indictments, of which nineteen were instigated in part by self-publicized and self-reported non-registration.

A principal element for conviction under the act is proving a violation of the act was intentional, i.e. knowing and willful. In the opinion of legal experts, such intent is almost impossible to prove unless there is evidence of a prospective defendant knowing about his obligation to register and intentionally choosing not to do so. For example, if there is evidence that the government provided notice to the prospective defendant to register or report for induction at any time, he was given an opportunity to comply, but the prospective defendant chose not to do so.

The last prosecution for non-registration was in January 1986. In interviews published in U.S. News & World Report in May 2016, current and former Selective Service System officials said that in 1988, the Department of Justice and Selective Service agreed to suspend any further prosecutions of non-registrants. No law since 1980 has required anyone to possess, carry, or show a draft card, and routine checks requiring identification virtually never include a request for a draft card.

As an alternative method of encouraging or coercing registration, Solomon Amendment laws were passed requiring that to receive financial aid, federal grants and loans, certain government benefits, eligibility for most federal employment, and (if the person is an immigrant) eligibility for citizenship, a young man had to be registered (or had to have been registered, if they are over 26 but were required to register between 18 and 26) with the Selective Service. Those who were required to register but failed to do so before they turned 26 are no longer allowed to register and thus may be permanently barred from federal jobs and other benefits, unless they can show to the Selective Service that their failure was not knowing and willful. There is a procedure to provide an "information letter" to the Selective Service for those in these situations, for example, recent citizens who entered the U.S. after their 26th birthday. The federal law requiring Selective Service registration as a condition of federal financial aid for higher education was overridden in December 2020, and the questions about Selective Service registration status on the FAFSA form were eliminated on 1 July 2023.

Most states, as well as the District of Columbia, Guam, Northern Mariana Islands, and Virgin Islands, have passed laws requiring registration for men 18–25 to be eligible for programs that vary on a per-jurisdiction basis but typically include driver's licenses, state-funded higher education benefits, and state government jobs. Alaska also requires registration to receive an Alaska Permanent Fund dividend. Eleven states (California, Connecticut, Indiana, Massachusetts, Nebraska, New Jersey, Oregon, Pennsylvania, Vermont, Washington, and Wyoming) have no such requirements, though Indiana and Washington do give men 18–25 the option of registering with Selective Service when obtaining a driver's license or an identification card. The Department of motor vehicles of 27 states and 2 territories automatically register young men 18–25 with the Selective Service whenever they apply for driver licenses, learner permits, or non-driver identification cards.

There are some third-party-organized efforts to compensate financial aid for those students losing benefits, including the Fund for Education and Training (FEAT) and Student Aid Fund for Non-registrants.

== Alien or dual-national registrant status ==
Some registrants are not U.S. citizens or have dual nationality of the U.S. and another country; they fall instead into one of the following categories:

- Alien or Dual National (class 4-C): An alien is a person who is not a citizen of the United States. A dual national is a person who is a citizen of the United States and another country. They are defined in four classes.
  - Registrants who have lived in the United States for less than a year are exempt from military training and service but become eligible after a year of cumulative residence (counting disjoint time periods).
  - A registrant who left the United States before his Order to Report for Induction was issued and whose order has not been canceled. He may be classified in Class 4-C only for the period he resides outside the United States. Upon his return to the United States, he must report the date of return and his current address to the Selective Service Area Office.
  - A registrant who registered at a time required by Selective Service law and thereafter acquired status within one of its groups of persons exempt from registration. He will be eligible for this class only during the period of his exempt status. To support this claim, the registrant must submit documentation from the diplomatic agency of the country of which he is a subject verifying his exempt status.
  - A registrant, lawfully admitted for permanent residence, as defined in Paragraph (2) of Section 101(a) of the Immigration and Nationality Act of 1952, as amended (66 Stat. 163, 8 U.S.C. 1101), who, by reason of their occupational status, is subject to adjustment to non-immigrant status under paragraph (15)(A), (15)(E), or (15)(G) or section 101(a). In this case, the person must also have executed a waiver of all rights, privileges, exemptions, and immunities that would otherwise accrue to him as a result of his occupational status.
- Dual national: The person is a citizen of both the United States and another country at the same time. The country must be one that allows its citizens dual citizenship, and the registrant must be able to obtain and produce the proper papers to affirm this status.
- Treaty alien: Due to a treaty or international arrangement with the alien's country of origin, the registrant can choose to be ineligible for military training and service in the armed forces of the United States. However, once this exemption is taken, he can never apply for U.S. citizenship and may become inadmissible to reenter the U.S. after leaving unless he has already served in the Armed Forces of a foreign country of which the alien was a national. Nevertheless, an alien who establishes clear and convincing evidence of certain factors may still override this kind of bar to naturalization.

== Legal issues ==
The Selective Service System is authorized by Article I, Section 8 of the United States Constitution which says Congress "shall have Power To... provide for calling forth the Militia to execute the Laws of the Union." The Selective Service Act is the law that established the Selective Service System under these provisions.

The act has been challenged in light of the Thirteenth Amendment to the United States Constitution, which prohibits "involuntary servitude." These challenges, however, have not been supported by the courts, as the Supreme Court stated in Butler v. Perry (1916):

The amendment was adopted with reference to conditions existing since the foundation of our government, and the term 'involuntary servitude' was intended to cover those forms of compulsory labor akin to African slavery which, in practical operation, would tend to produce like undesirable results. It introduced no novel doctrine with respect of services always treated as exceptional, and certainly was not intended to interdict enforcement of those duties which individuals owe to the state, such as services in the army, militia, on the jury, etc.

During the First World War, the Supreme Court ruled in Arver v. United States (1918), also known as the Selective Draft Law Cases, that the draft did not violate the Constitution.

Later, during the Vietnam War, a federal appellate court concluded in Holmes v. United States (1968) that the draft was constitutional even during peacetime.

Since the reinstatement of draft registration in 1980, the Supreme Court has heard and decided four cases related to the Military Selective Service Act: Rostker v. Goldberg, 453 U.S. 57 (1981), upholding the constitutionality of requiring men but not women to register for the draft; Selective Service v. Minnesota Public Interest Research Group (MPIRG), 468 U.S. 841 (1984), upholding the constitutionality of the "Solomon Amendment," which requires applicants for Federal student aid to certify that they have complied with draft registration, either by having registered or by not being required to register; Wayte v. United States, 470 U.S. 598 (1985), upholding the policies and procedures that the Supreme Court thought the government had used to select the "most vocal" non-registrants for prosecution, after the government refused to comply with discovery orders by the trial court to produce documents and witnesses related to the selection of non-registrants for prosecution; and Elgin v. Department of Treasury, 567 U.S. 1 (2012), regarding procedures for judicial review of denial of federal employment for non-registrants.

The case National Coalition for Men v. Selective Service System resulted in the male-only draft registration being declared unconstitutional by a district court. That decision was reversed by the 5th Circuit Court of Appeals. A petition for review was then filed with the U.S. Supreme Court. The U.S. Supreme Court declined to review the decision by the Court of Appeals.

== Structure and operation ==
The Selective Service System is an independent federal agency within the Executive Branch of the federal government of the United States. The director of the Selective Service System reports directly to the president of the United States. Starting on the day of the inauguration of President Joe Biden, the Selective Service System was under an acting director following the departure of the previous director, Don Benton, and pending the nomination and confirmation of a new permanent director.

During peacetime, the agency comprises a national headquarters, three regional headquarters, and a data management center. Even during peacetime, the agency is also aided by 11,000 volunteers serving on local boards and district appeal boards. During a mobilization that required activation of the draft, the agency would greatly expand by activating an additional 56 state headquarters, more than 400 area offices, and over 40 alternative service offices.

The agency's budget for the 2015–2016 fiscal year was about $23 million. In early 2016, the agency said that if women were required to register, its budget would need to be increased by about $9 million in the first year and slightly less in subsequent years. This does not include any budget or expenses for enforcing or attempting to enforce the Military Selective Service Act. Costs of investigating, prosecuting, and imprisoning violators would be included in the budget of the Department of Justice.

== Mobilization (draft) procedures ==
The description below is for a general draft under the current Selective Service regulations. These procedures could be altered by Congress, either as part of the legislation authorizing inductions or through separate measures, so there is no guarantee this is how a draft would function. Different procedures would be followed for a special-skills draft, such as the activation of the Health Care Personnel Delivery System (HCPDS).

1. Congress and the president authorize a draft: The president claims a crisis has occurred that requires more troops than the volunteer military can supply. Congress passes and the president signs legislation that revises the Military Selective Service Act to initiate a draft for military manpower.
2. The lottery: A lottery based on birthdays determines the order in which registered men are called up by Selective Service. The first individuals called, in a sequence determined by the lottery, will be men whose 20th birthday falls during the calendar year of induction, followed, as needed, by those aged 21, 22, 23, 24, 25, 19, and 18 (in that order).
3. All parts of the Selective Service System are activated: The agency activates and orders its state directors and Reserve Force officers to report for duty.
4. Physical, mental, and moral evaluations of the registrants: Registrants with low lottery numbers receive examination orders and are ordered to report for a physical, mental, and moral evaluation at a Military Entrance Processing Station (MEPS) to determine whether they are fit for military service. Once he is notified of the results of the evaluation, a registrant will be given 10 days to file a claim for exemption, postponement, or deferment.
5. Local and appeal boards activated and induction notices sent: Local and appeal boards will begin processing registrant claims/appeals. Those who passed the military evaluation will receive induction orders. An inductee will have 10 days to report to a local MEPS for induction.
6. First draftees are inducted: According to current plans, Selective Service must deliver the first inductees to the military within 193 days from the onset of a crisis.

== Lottery procedures ==
If the agency were to mobilize and conduct a draft, a lottery would be held in full view of the public. First, all days of the year are placed into a capsule at random. Second, the agency places the numbers 1–365 (1–366 for lotteries held in a leap year) into a second capsule. These two capsules are certified for procedure, sealed in a drum, and stored.

If a draft occurs, the drums are removed from storage and checked for tampering. The lottery then takes place, and each date is paired with a number at random. For example, if 19 January is picked from the "date" capsule and the number 59 picked from the "number" capsule, all men of age 20 born on 19 January will be the 59th group to receive induction notices. This process continues until all dates are matched with a number.

Should all dates be used, the Selective Service will first conscript men at the age of 20, then 21, 22, 23, 24, 25, 19, and 18. Once all dates are paired, the dates will be sent to Selective Service System's Data Management Center.

== Classifications ==
=== 1948–1976 ===
Class	Categories (1948–1975)
1-A	Available for unrestricted military service
1-A-O	Conscientious objector available for noncombatant military service only
1-C	Member of the Armed Forces of the United States, the National Oceanic and Atmospheric Administration, or the Public Health Service. Enlisted (Enl.): member who volunteered for service. Inducted (Ind.): member who was conscripted into service. Discharged (Dis.): member released after completing service; later changed to Class 4-A. Separated (Sep.): member released before completing service; may be recalled to service if their status has changed
1-D	Members of a reserve component (reserves or National Guard), students taking military training (service academy, senior military college, or ROTC), or accepted aviation cadet applicants (1942–1975)
1-D-D	Deferment for certain members of a reserve component or student taking military training
1-D-E	Exemption of certain members of a reserve component or student taking military training
1-H	Registrant not currently subject to processing for induction or alternative service Within the cessation of registrant processing in 1976, all registrants (except for a few alleged violators of the Military Selective Service Act) were classified 1-H regardless of any previous classification.
1-O	Conscientious objector to all military service. A registrant must establish to the satisfaction of the board that his request for exemption from combatant and noncombatant military training and service in the Armed Forces is based upon moral, ethical or religious beliefs which play a significant role in his life and that his objection to participation in war is not confined to a particular war. The registrant is still required to serve in civilian alternative service.
1-O-S	Conscientious objector to all military service (separated). A registrant separated from the Armed Forces due to objection to participation in both combatant and noncombatant training and service in the Armed Forces. The registrant is still required to serve in civilian alternative service.
1-S (H)	Student deferred by statute (high school). Induction can be deferred either until graduation or until reaching the age of 20.
1-S (C)	Student deferred by statute (college). Induction can be deferred either to the end of the student's current semester if an undergraduate or until the end of the academic year if a senior.
1-W	Conscientious objector currently performing assigned alternative service. They must serve for a set period of time equal to their owed national service (currently 24 consecutive months).
1-W-R	(Released) Conscientious objector who satisfactorily completed their service. This was later changed to Class 4-W.
1-Y	Registrant qualified for service only in time of war or national emergency The 1-Y classification was abolished 10 December 1971. Local boards were subsequently instructed to reclassify all 1-Y registrants by administrative action.
2-A	Registrant deferred because of essential civilian non-agricultural occupation. Also includes deferments due to full-time study or training in an essential trade or profession at a trade school, community or junior college, or an approved apprenticeship program
2-B	Registrant deferred because of occupation in a war industry or a trade or profession considered essential to national defense: (defense contractor or reserved occupation). This exemption was discontinued in 1951.
2-C	Registrant deferred because of agricultural occupation
2-D	Registrant is a divinity student attending an accredited theological or divinity school to be prepared for the ministry. Deferment lasted either until graduation or until the registrant reached the age of 24. Exemption was created in December 1971. Previously considered part of Class 4-D
2-S	Registrant deferred because of collegiate study. Deferment lasted either until graduation or until the registrant reached the age of 24. Exemption was discontinued in December 1971. It previously also deferred graduate students studying medicine, dentistry, veterinary medicine, osteopathic medicine, and optometry, and graduate students in their fifth year of continuous study toward a doctoral degree. The exemption for graduate and doctoral students was discontinued in 1967.
3-A	Registrant deferred because of hardship to dependents
3-A-S	Registrant deferred because of hardship to dependents (separated). Current serving member or registrant undergoing induction separated from military service due to a change in family status. The registrant's deferment can last no longer than six months, after which they may re-file if the hardship continues to exist.
4-A	Registrant who has completed military service
4-A-A	Registrant who has performed military service for a foreign nation
4-B	Official deferred by law
4-C	Alien or dual national
4-D	Minister of religion, formally ordained by a recognized religion, and serving as a full-time minister with a church and congregation
4-E	Conscientious objector opposed to both combatant and noncombatant training and service. Alternative service in lieu of induction may still be required. Created in 1948; changed to Class 1-O in 1951
4-F	Registrant not acceptable for military service. To be eligible for Class 4-F, a registrant must have been found not qualified for service in the Armed Forces by an MEPS under the established physical, mental, or moral standards. Future standards of physical fitness came from AR 40–501.
4-G	Registrant exempted from service because of the death of a parent or sibling while serving in the Armed Forces or whose parent or sibling has Prisoner of war or Missing in action status
4-T	Treaty alien
4-W	Conscientious objector who has fully and satisfactorily completed alternative service in lieu of induction
5-A	Registrant who is over either the age of liability if a deferment had not been taken (currently 26 years or older) or (where applicable) the age of liability if a deferment with extended liability had been taken (currently 35 years or older)

=== Present ===
If a draft were authorized by Congress, without any other changes being made in the law, local boards would classify registrants to determine whether they were exempt from military service. According to the Code of Federal Regulations Title 32, Chapter XVI, Sec. 1630.2, men would be sorted into the following categories:

Class	Present categories
1-A	Available for unrestricted military service
1-A-O	Conscientious objector available for noncombatant military service only
1-C	Member of the Armed Forces of the United States, the National Oceanic and Atmospheric Administration, or the Public Health Service
1-D-D	Deferment for certain members of a reserve component or student taking military training
1-D-E	Exemption of certain members of a reserve component or student taking military training
1-H	Registrant not subject to processing for induction
1-O	Conscientious objector to all military service
1-O-S	Conscientious objector to all military service (separated)
1-W	Conscientious objector ordered to perform alternative service
2-D	Registrant deferred because of study preparing for the ministry
3-A	Registrant deferred because of hardship to dependents
3-A-S	Registrant deferred because of hardship to dependents (separated)
4-A	Registrant who has completed military service
4-B	Official deferred by law
4-C	Alien or dual national
4-D	Minister of religion
4-F	Registrant not acceptable for military service
4-G	Registrant exempted from service because of the death of his parent or sibling while serving in the Armed Forces or whose parent or sibling is in a captured or missing in action status
4-T	Treaty alien
4-W	Registrant who has completed alternative service in lieu of induction
4-A-A	Registrant who has performed military service for a foreign nation

== Directors ==
#	Portrait	Director	Tenure	Appointed by
1.		Clarence Addison Dykstra	15 October 1940 – 1 April 1941	Franklin D. Roosevelt
2.		Lewis Blaine Hershey	31 July 1941 – 15 February 1970	Franklin D. Roosevelt
–		Dee Ingold	15 February 1970 – 6 April 1970	(Acting)
3.		Curtis W. Tarr	6 April 1970 – 1 May 1972	Richard Nixon
–		Byron V. Pepitone	1 May 1972 – 1 April 1973	(Acting)
4.		Byron V. Pepitone	2 April 1973 – 31 July 1977	Richard Nixon
–		Robert E. Shuck	1 August 1977 – 25 November 1979	(Acting)
5.		Bernard D. Rostker	26 November 1979 – 31 July 1981	Jimmy Carter
–		James G. Bond	1 August 1981 – 30 October 1981	(Acting)
6.		Thomas K. Turnage	30 October 1981 – 23 March 1986	Ronald Reagan
–		Wilfred L. Ebel	24 March 1986 – 8 July 1987	(Acting)
–		Jerry D. Jennings	9 July 1987 – 17 December 1987	(Acting)
7.		Samuel K. Lessey Jr.	18 December 1987 – 7 March 1991	Ronald Reagan
8.		Robert W. Gambino	8 March 1991 – 31 January 1994	George H. W. Bush
–		G. Huntington Banister	1 February 1994 – 6 October 1994	(Acting)
9.		Gil Coronado	7 October 1994 – 23 May 2001	Bill Clinton
10.		Alfred V. Rascon	24 May 2001 – 2 January 2003	George W. Bush
–		Lewis C. Brodsky	3 January 2003 – 28 April 2004	(Acting)
–		Jack Martin	29 April 2004 – 28 November 2004	(Acting)
11.		William A. Chatfield	29 November 2004 – 29 May 2009	George W. Bush
–		Ernest E. Garcia	29 May 2009 – 4 December 2009	(Acting)
12.		Lawrence Romo	4 December 2009 – 20 January 2017	Barack Obama
–		Adam J. Copp	20 January 2017 – 13 April 2017	(Acting)
13.		Donald M. Benton	13 April 2017 – 20 January 2021	Donald Trump
–		Craig T. Brown	20 January 2021 – 27 August 2022	(Acting)
–		Joel C. Spangenberg	28 August 2022 – 20 January 2025	(Acting)
–		Craig T. Brown	20 January 2025–present	(Acting)

== See also ==
- Adjusted Service Rating Score, the demobilization points system employed by the U.S. Army at the end of World War II
- Civilian Public Service
- Cohen v. California
- Conscription in China, a similar system in China
- Conscription in the United States
- Draft-card burning
- Draft evasion
- Lodge–Philbin Act
- Title 32 of the Code of Federal Regulations

== Books ==
- Kennedy, David (1999). Freedom from Fear: The American People in Depression and War, 1929–1945. Oxford: Oxford University Press. ISBN 0-19-514403-1.
